= Florida cracker (disambiguation) =

Florida cracker or Florida Cracker may refer to:

- Florida cracker, a sometimes disparaging term for colonial-era British and American pioneer settlers, and their modern-day descendants, in what is now the US state of Florida
- Florida cracker architecture, a style of home design, originating among 19th-century Floridians, and typified by a wood-framed house with a metal roof, raised floor, straight central hallway, and a wide veranda or porch
- Florida Cracker Trail, a historic cattle and horse trail between Bradenton and Fort Pierce, Florida; today includes parts of US Highway 98, State Road 66, and State Road 64.
- Florida Cracker cattle, a breed of criollo-type, non-crossbred cattle developed in what is now the US state of Florida; also known as Cracker cattle and Florida scrub cattle.
- Florida Cracker Horse, a breed of Spanish Colonial-group horses developed in what is now the US state of Florida; also known as Chickasaw Pony, Seminole Pony, Prairie Pony, Florida Horse, Florida Cow Pony

== See also ==
- Cracker (term), about use of the term as a slur
- Cracker Country, a living-history village at the Florida State Fair
- Cracker Gothic, a combination of Florida cracker architecture and Gothic revival architecture elements
- Cracker Storytelling Festival, an annual event since 1988, at Homeland Heritage Park in Homeland, Florida
- Florida Western, a genre of film and novel set among the crackers of 19th-century Florida
- Georgia cracker, the similar rural subculture of the US state of Georgia, just north of Florida
