= Olin Mott =

American philanthropist

Olin Mott (March 5, 1921 – July 2, 2013) was the founder of Olin Mott Tire Stores and a philanthropist who lived in Tampa, Florida.

Mott was born March 5, 1921, in Coffee, Georgia and was one of eight children. He joined the Army and was stationed at Fort Kamehameha in Hawaii. He was injured in the attack on Pearl Harbor on December 7, 1941.

After the war, he moved to Tampa. He worked for a tire business that did retreading before starting his own tire business, Olin Mott Tire store, in 1955 at 3741 East Hillsborough Avenue. He eventually expanded the business to six locations. His office was decorated with photos of Mott with notable friends including George Steinbrenner, Lee Roy Selmon, and Billy Martin as well as every Republican president of the United States since Richard Nixon.

He served on the Florida State Fair board from 1998 to 2012, developed the Bob Thomas Equestrian Center at the Fairgrounds with Bob Thomas, and helped bring a football program to University of South Florida. He also started the Tutor-a-Bull school tutoring program in 2007. In 2011, Lee Roy Selmon presented Mott with the Tampa Metro Civitan Club Outstanding Citizen of the Year Award.

Mott married Doris Albright in 1946.
