= Mount Dora Ghost Walk =

Lantern-guided walking tour of Mount Dora, Florida

The Mount Dora Ghost Walk is a ninety minute long bizarre bilingual theatrical and lantern-guided walking tour of the city of Mount Dora, Florida. It is an adventure into the darker side of the city often referred to by visitors as the New England of the South, and gets its inspiration from the local history, legends, and myths that are compiled by a group of historians and actors.

As an entertainment venue The Mount Dora Ghost Walk consists of live Victorian costumed actors giving a macabre theatrical interpretation that involves comedy, storytelling, improvisation and parlor magic, all of which is immediately followed by the full stage marionette theater performance that serves as the introductory platform launching the audience into the final walking tour. The outdoors tour itself, led by the same actors that performed during the indoors show, is the longest part of the venue and takes the participants through historical streets and inside landmark locations. The storyteller always stay in character while performing the interactive narration using props and other theatrical resources. To this date the show is considered the leading attraction of its kind in Lake County, Florida, has been ranked among the top 10 spooky attractions in the Orlando, Florida area, and a location that regularly attracts the attention of paranormal investigators. For its first 3 years of existence the enterprise operated exclusively from the Mount Dora Historical Society Old Jail Museum, but as its aim has grown considerably to also include full length theatrical productions, the show is now associated with the historical Lakeside Inn in Mount Dora.

The Mount Dora Ghost Walk originality and unique approaches have been a staple for the entire Central Florida area, and its reputation as an entertainment venue has stimulated several other groups to try to copy the concept, but unfortunately with less success. The creators would like to see more venues like theirs spawning all around the area. According to one of its founders Andrew Mullen, their failure may be because "the others just wanted to do a spooky show, but we have created the entire Cracker Gothic concept, restored cemeteries, produced full theater, and no one will be able to surpass or even match that.We are the original ghost storytellers in Lake County."

== History ==
Although considered by many as a ghost tour or haunted attraction, The Mount Dora Ghost Walk can be more precisely defined as a theater experience very similar to the old and long gone ghost shows running from the 1920s through the 1960s on movie theater stages across the United States.

The Mount Dora Ghost Walk Main Characters.

Inspired by the increasing public interest on the paranormal research of ghost hunters, and the proliferating number of guided tours geared towards the macabre side of history as a tourist attraction, its creators and founders Andrew Mullen and Hector De Leon adopted the idea for a similar ghost walk as their contribution to benefit the Mount Dora History Museum and the Mount Dora Historical Society.The City of Mount Dora and Lake County, Florida have a rich patrimony of ghostly legends of historical value, so having a venue such as a ghost tour was not a far-fetched idea, considering that up to the time the amount of haunted attractions was negligible outside of those provided by the region's theme parks. Both being avid amateur historians with unique artistic talents, but sharing a common passion for historical reenactment, acting and Gothic lore, their concept evolved into a very different direction that including innovative puppetry, magic, actors, Storytellers and a historical trail, is self proclaiming to be a new form of Southern Gothic for which De Leon created the name "Cracker Gothic" to make a clear distinction.

After their random first meeting at the front door of the museum, where Mullen volunteers as president of the Mount Dora Historical Society, the two quickly allied to brainstorm potential ideas and one week later they had a complete full script and the marionette stage on its way. The plan was simply to create a group of mysterious ghostly characters along a story line based or inspired on the history of Mount Dora. After researching and writing the stories the decision was made to invite local volunteers willing to participate acting the theatrical vignettes along the route, providing the voices for the marionette theater sound track, helping with the logistics, or guiding the tours as storytellers. More than thirty people of all ages responded to this first call and within days a full cast was complete and scheduled for weekly rehearsals. Once the rehearsals finished, the historical museum transformed into a haunted version of a Freak Show, and the marionette program was finalized; the official inaugural date of The Mount Dora Ghost Walk was October 28, 2008, with three shows running nightly through November 1, 2008.

As the initial plan was to have the event only once a year, Mullen and De Leon never expected to receive the torrent of requests that followed asking to continue the show permanently, specially from the local Mount Dora business sector. A decision was promptly made to accommodate this general support with shows offered the 1st and 3rd weekends of the month, and during special times like Halloween, Christmas or any Friday the 13th. Since then, the group has continued providing a very creative entertaining production that has influenced and inspired others to bring more "scary" venues, particularly around Halloween. However, The Mount Dora ghost Walk continues as the only year around macabre show in their area, and the only one that has served as a platform to bring new entertainment options like the Cracker Gothic Acting Group producing dinner theater and parlor theater performances at the historical Lakeside Inn,

== The Story Line ==
Most known ghost tours in the United States are guided excursions of the hosting city. More often than not they are just walking experiences although several well-known ones also use trolleys and even converted hearses to take their audience out. Some other tours combine special packages that may include dining, pub visits, or other specialized privileges like a visit to a more restricted location.

As The Mount Dora Ghost Walk main objective is to educate people about the history of a city already well known for its tourist appeal, the creators had the challenge to offer not only a tour through a historical trail, but a solid venue that could be compared in reputation to the many festivals traditionally offered. For this purpose they had to be sure that their intended product could stand out over the many others through the nation, presents a novel format, attracts the interest of the general public, adheres to the traditions of the city, and most importantly, entertains. Perhaps the most important goal was the overall general acceptance from the other merchants and organizers of events, such as the Mount Dora Village Merchant's and Business Association.

After researching and visiting similar tours from Key West, Florida to Savannah, Georgia, the consensus was to create not just a tour, but a complete show culminating with the outdoors walk. It was agreed that guides wearing costumes and describing isolated legends was not enough, and that a much enduring approach that could create unforgettable memories was the way to go.

After investigating the material compiled through their own work with the historical society, the creators wrote a storyline where every single haunted story converged on three mythical and fictional main characters through a very complex and twisted plot. These characters were to be the glue for all the other characters in the tour's stories, as they sustain their claims of either being involved with, or were responsible of each of the narrated events.

The plot is based on the idea of a fantastical man made gateway, known as the Keyhole Vortex, that transports living humans and ghosts back and forth between historical periods and the beyond. This movement ends up creating a series of disruptions of a hypothetical reality continuum that is the cause of all the bizarre events in all of history, particularly the history of Mount Dora. This Keyhole Vortex is like a time machine that not only travels through time, but is also capable of crossing the barriers between the spiritual and real worlds. All the acting characters are essentially macabre human or ghostly travelers of this device, whom unfortunately are trapped inside the continuum of current day Mount Dora. As any good plot always has a villain, in this case all the chaotically and mysterious events described are because of the evil doings of a never seen mythical but historically inspired ghost known as Dr. Nutter. Having no other way to return to their respective realities, the main characters have to endure their imposed captivity guiding and educating people about the dangers of the Keyhole Vortex's macabre effects on history, hoping that in exchange they will receive clues about the whereabouts of the infamous Dr. Nutter and his malignant spawn Raspail. With this crazy convoluted story highlighted by jokes, puns, and other weirdness, the whole thing takes a live of its own and keeps feeding itself with new situations and characters that complicate the story even more. After all, and as Mullen, De Leon and Miller will gladly claim, "this weird storyline can be consider almost a hybrid mutated child between shows like science fiction's Doctor Who, The Time Tunnel, and The X-Files with comedy's Gilligan's Island, The Munsters, The Addams Family and Monty Python."

== The stories ==
For a ghost tour to be successful it is necessary to have a well prepared set of interesting stories related to important locations, prominent people and remarkable events. Although the sources for these stories may be very variable, in general they are mostly based on true historical facts, legends, myths, or oral traditions. Researching historical facts can be measured even scientifically. But to define legend and myth there are more ambiguities of different types such a sociological, cultural, and religious among other. Although not everything that is part of folklore can be absolutely verifiable material, at least even the most bizarre of stories can be supported by saying that myth and legend are always based one something true. A definition of Legend states that "legends are tales that, because of the tie to a historical event or location, are believable, although not necessarily believed," and according to Hippolyte Delehaye, legend "has, of necessity, some historical or topographical connection. It refers imaginary events to some real personage, or it localizes romantic stories in some definite spot."

Since the first scripted version of The Mount Dora Ghost Walk, Mullen and De Leon made the firm resolution of utilizing the vast number of resources and references available to them from the Mount Dora Historical Society's and the Mount Dora Library's archives. They conducted numerous personal interviews to tap into the resource of oral traditions, and consulted several books considered rare or out of print for more than sixty years. The stories compiled ranged from the bizarre and ridiculous tall tales being told a local pubs, to the more well known historical original material. As it turned out, considering that there were numerous and very interesting stories to select from, the task was more difficult than they anticipated. Finally the decision was made to select and develop those stories along a centralized and easy to complete walking route. Having as the main objective a family friendly and memorable entertainment event, rather than a ghost hunting symposium, the team saw as appropriate to modify or adapt some of the stories that because of their content would have resulted too graphic or intense. They knew that this would detract many of the hard core ghost enthusiasts, but this was not considered as a problem because true paranormal research has been done behind curtains and the information is available on request.

Among the stories presented during the show there are some that are part of the permanent repertoire and considered staples of Mount Dora's history. Other stories are included seasonally or alternated during special events, and some others are creative interpretations based on tales about a particular location or event. In general there is an average of 12 stories presented, with some of them enacted by the acting staff or the marionettes, while the rest are narrated during the tour. Each tour guide is a character of his own who has a particular narrative style that always delivers the performance according to his point of view and involvement with the plot. As they never have a predetermined schedule and the stories constantly change in relation to that character's mood, each tour can result in a completely different experience from the previous one, so in that way the audience will always have the chance of seeing something new. Perhaps the only exception is the plot performed by the marionettes, which is always a prerecorded play and necessary because of the logistical complexities involved in a puppetry show.

The following is an example of some of the stories throughout their regular season:

The Ghost of Fiddler's Pond: This is the oldest legend that has occurred within the city limits of today's Mount Dora. When it comes to historical, mystery, and romantic values, it is perhaps a true Mount Dora Gothic tale comparable to The Legend of Sleepy Hollow. The story is based on historical and folkloric elements that have been documented by different sources, including Edgerton's and Kennedy's books. Outside of the city of Mount Dora, by the intersection of Donnelly Street and State Road 441, exists a body of water named Fiddler's Pond. It is in reality a deep sink hole with a very steep bank, but which gives the appearance of a large pond. By the time the town settlement was on its way during the mid-1870s, early references already had named the body of water as Fiddler's Pond. Although no specific evidence has been found yet about the origin of the name, Edgerton described in his book that the location was a frequently used watering stop for the animals pulling wagons into Mount Dora. As the story goes, a Mellonville (today's Sanford, Florida) merchant's wagon caravan suffered an accident losing all its cargo consisting of fiddle cases. However, several folk tales about the place have described that the location got its name after an errant vagrant fiddler mysteriously disappeared only leaving his fiddle case, which was later found floating on the waters. It was assumed that the man drowned there leaving the place haunted. Some local residents have claimed witnessing apparitions that wander around the area late at night, or have heard some sad fiddle sounds coming from the orange groves that for more than hundred years have surrounded the pond. Gina Mamo and Kaiden Long originated the roles in fiddlers pond.

== Storytelling ==
Another art form highly cultivated and promoted by the cast members is storytelling. The group of performers are carefully selected from those with a special talent for this narrative art.
