= Bob Thomas Equestrian Center =

Equestrian center in East Lake-Orient Park, Florida

Coordinates: 27.9877°N 82.3622°W

The Bob Thomas Equestrian Center is an equestrian center located on the Florida State Fairgrounds in East Lake-Orient Park, Florida.

A new center was opened in December 2003 at a cost of $1.5 million, replacing a previous outdoor arena. The facility encompasses 52,000 square feet (4,800 m^{2}), of which 9,000 square feet (840 m^{2}) is an indoor pavilion. A 2004 article in The Tampa Tribune considered the arena to have safety advantages resulting from its roof preventing the arena ground from being too wet or too dry. As constructed, five barns onsite contained 471 stalls.

Bob Thomas and his friend Olin Mott raised the money to build the facility.

== See also ==
- Florida State Fair
