= Cracker Gothic =

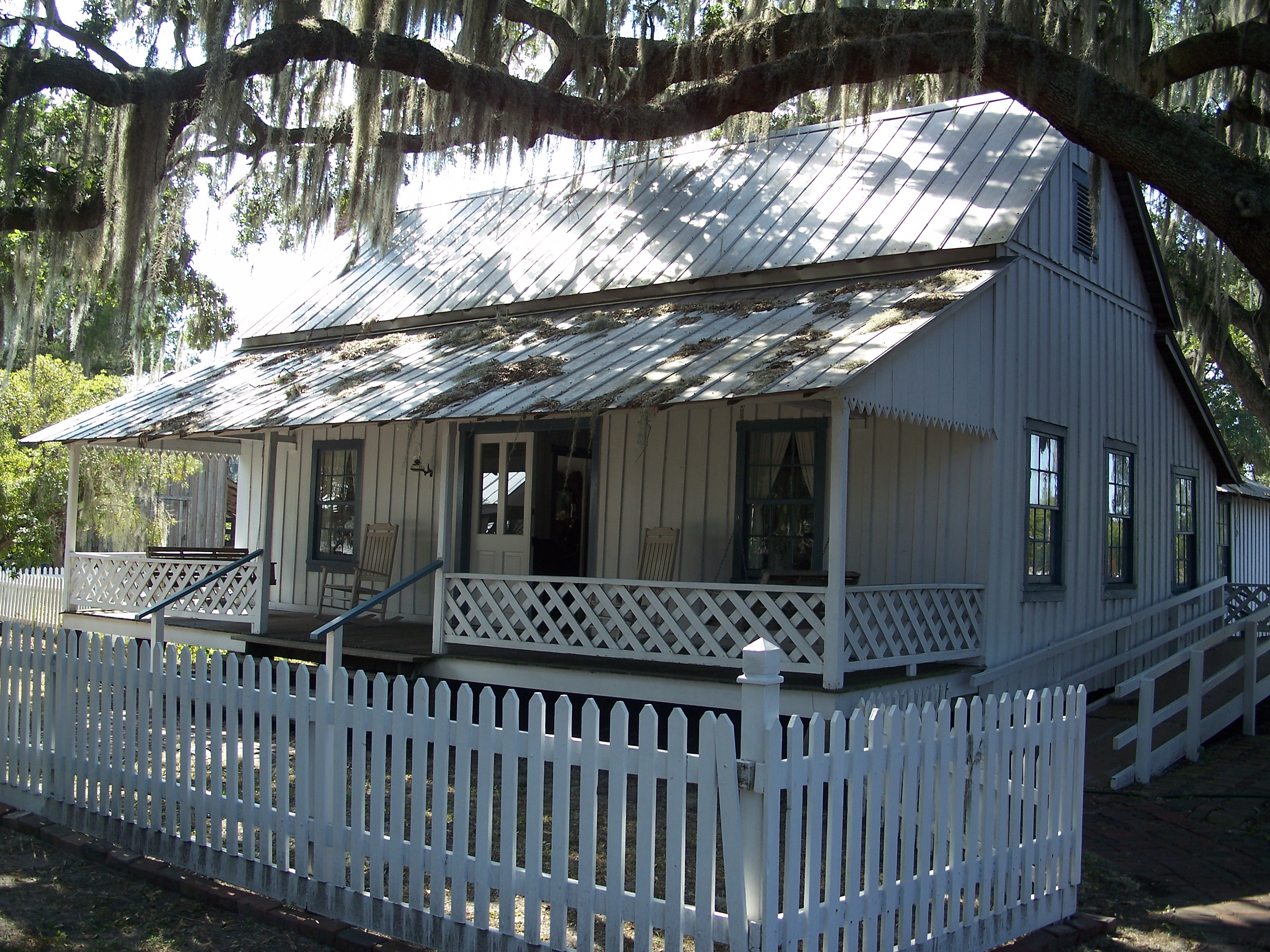
An example of Cracker Gothic in Bradenton, Florida.

Cracker Gothic is a term for vernacular style of historical homes in Florida that are otherwise considered under the Florida cracker architecture style. Cracker Gothic comes from the combination of Florida cracker and Gothic Revival architecture and can be used interchangeably with Southern Gothic. Examples include the Cracker Country Museum, the Stephens House at the Manatee Village Historical Park and Capt. Francis A. Hendry House.
