= Expo Hall =

Indoor arena in Tampa, Florida

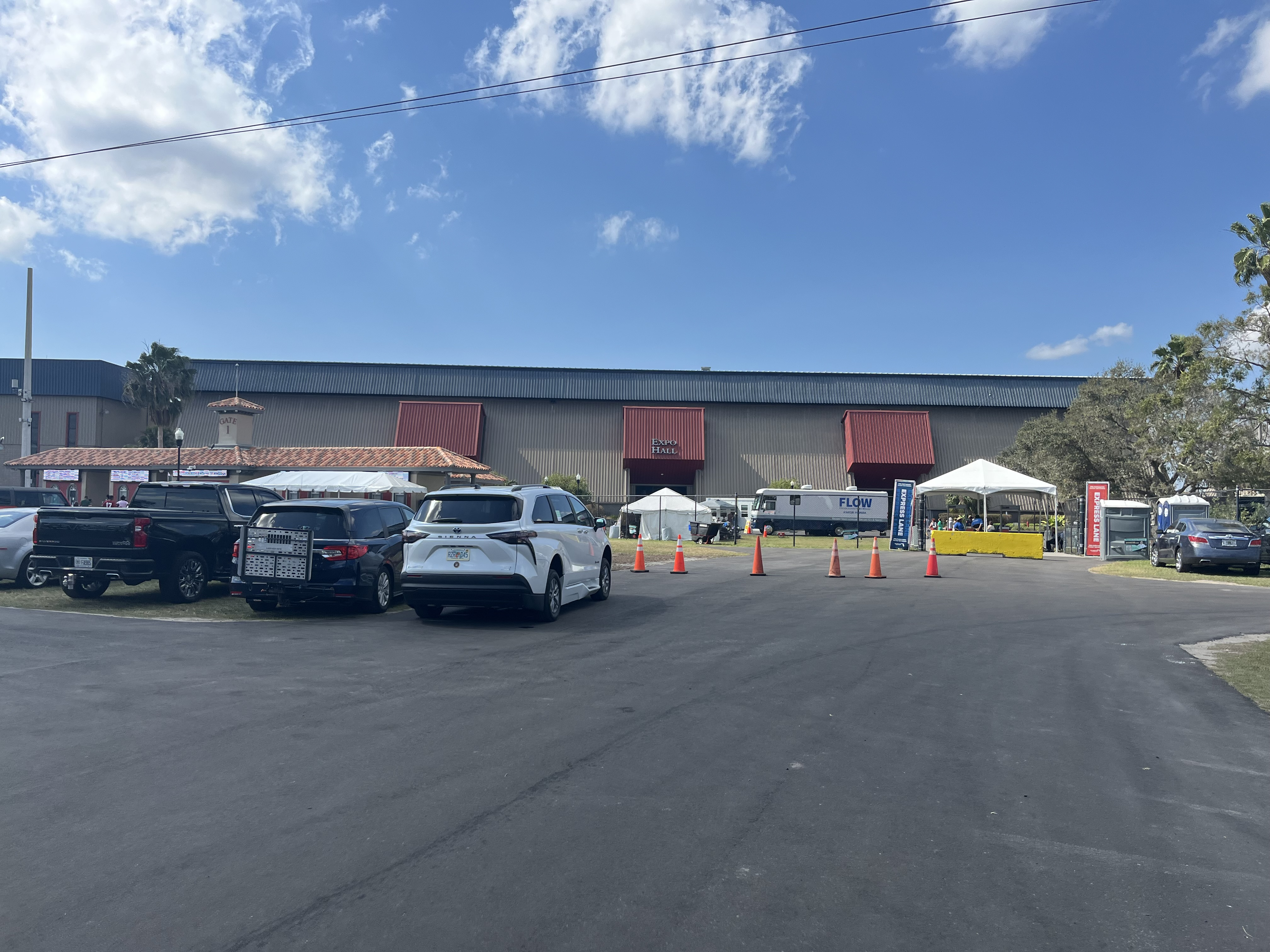
- Expo Hall in 2025

- Location in Florida Location in the United States
- Former names: Tampa Fairgrounds Arena (1977–83)
- Address: 4800 US Highway 301 North
- Location: East Lake-Orient Park, Florida
- Coordinates: 27°59′26″N 82°21′45″W
- Owner: Florida State Fair Authority
- Operator: Florida State Fair Authority
- Capacity: Indoor soccer: 9,200; Ice hockey: 10,425; Concerts: 11,926
- Field size: 88,000 sq ft (8,200 m^{2})

Construction
- Opened: 1977

Tenants
- South Florida Bulls men's basketball (1979–1980); Tampa Bay Rowdies (NASL) (1984); Tampa Bay Lightning (NHL) (1992–1993); Tampa Bay Tritons (RHI) (1994)

Website
- www.floridastatefair.com

Expo Hall is an indoor arena located at the Florida State Fairgrounds in East Lake-Orient Park, Florida. It is used primarily as an exhibition hall during the Florida State Fair, but has also hosted concerts and sporting events.

The South Florida Bulls men's basketball team used Expo Hall as their main home arena for the 1979–80 season before the on-campus USF Sun Dome opened.

The Tampa Bay Rowdies of the defunct North American Soccer League used Expo Hall for 8 of their 16 home games during the 1983–84 indoor season. At that time the arena's capacity was 9,200. This would also prove to be the league's final indoor campaign before suspending operations following the 1984 outdoor season.

The arena was more famously used by the National Hockey League's Tampa Bay Lightning during the team's inaugural season of 1992–93. The facility's seating capacity of 10,425 proved too small for the Lightning, and the team relocated to the ThunderDome in St. Petersburg for three seasons, until its permanent home, Benchmark International Arena, was built in downtown Tampa.

In 1994 the expansion Tampa Bay Tritons of Roller Hockey International played for one season at Expo Hall before folding. Mark Messier owned the club.

The facility currently hosts graduation ceremonies for Hillsborough County's public high schools.

Noteworthy entertainers to perform in concert at Expo Hall include Robert Plant, REO Speedwagon, Cheap Trick, No Doubt, Green Day, Nine Inch Nails, Peter Frampton, Stone Temple Pilots, Yes, George Michael, Santana, Beastie Boys, Alabama, Motörhead, and the Smashing Pumpkins.

Preceded by first arena	Home of the Tampa Bay Lightning; 1992 – 1993	Succeeded by ThunderDome
