= Georgia cracker =

American pioneer settlers

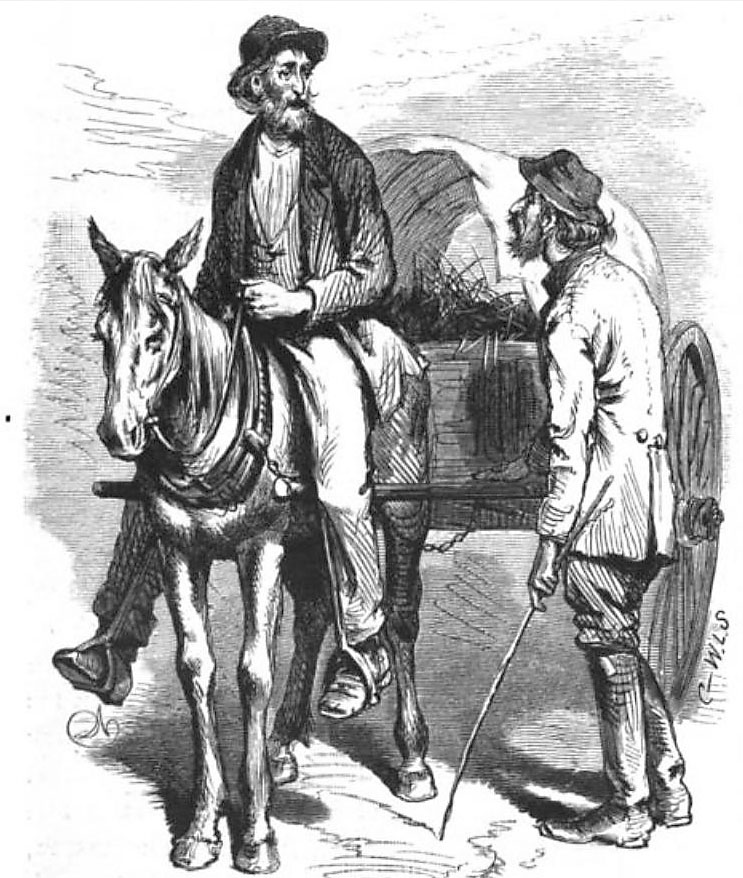

Regions with significant populations
- Georgia

Languages
- Southern American English

Religion
- Christianity

Related ethnic groups
- Florida crackers, White Southerners, Old Stock Americans

Georgia crackers are the descendants of colonial-era British American pioneer settlers in what is now the U.S. state of Georgia, and a subculture of White Southerners.

== History ==
In the late 19th century and the early part of the 20th century, Georgia ranchers came to be known as "Georgia Crackers" by Floridians when they drove their cattle down into the grassy flatlands of central Florida to graze in the winter, stopping where the citrus groves began. In order to get the cattle's attention they became very adept at cracking a bullwhip.

The term "cracker" was in use during Elizabethan times to describe braggarts. The original root of this is the Middle English word crack meaning "entertaining conversation" (One may be said to "crack" a joke; a witty remark is a "wisecrack"). This term and the Gaelic spelling "craic" are still in use in Ireland, Northern Ireland, and Scotland. It is documented in Shakespeare's King John (1595): "What cracker is this... that deafes our eares / With this abundance of superfluous breath?"

By the 1760s the ruling classes, both in Britain and in the American colonies, applied the term "cracker" to Scotch-Irish and English settlers of the remote southern back country, as noted in a passage from a letter to the Earl of Dartmouth: "I should explain to your Lordship what is meant by Crackers; a name they have got from being great boasters; they are a lawless set of rascalls on the frontiers of Virginia, Maryland, the Carolinas, and Georgia, who often change their places of abode." The word was later associated with the cowboys of Georgia and Florida, many of them descendants of those early frontiersmen.

== Usage ==
Among some Georgians, the term is used as a proud or jocular self-description. Since the influx of new residents into Georgia from the northern United States in the late 20th century, "Georgia cracker" has become used informally by some white residents of Georgia of Scots-Irish and English stock, to indicate that their family has lived there for many generations.

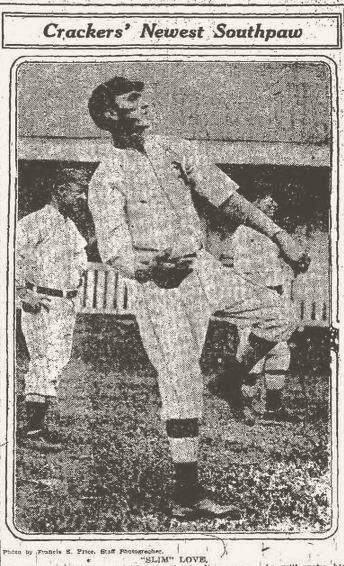
Photograph of Slim Love of the Atlanta Crackers (1913)

However, other Georgians find the term highly offensive and insulting: "'Cracker' has a murky history but generally describes poor whites. The slur is widely considered an insult among white southerners. . . . . for plenty of rural, white southerners, "cracker" is a demeaning, bigoted term . . . the equivalent of redneck."

The "Cracker Party" was a Democratic Party political machine that dominated city politics in Augusta, Georgia, for over 25 years, and exerted considerable political influence for roughly four decades after its 1946 defeat.

For several years before baseball's "Braves" National League franchise moved to Atlanta from Milwaukee, that city was home to an International League team called "the Atlanta Crackers".

== Notable persons ==
- Bill Arp, Georgia's foremost 19th-century humorist
- Roy V. Harris, a "Cracker Party" boss
- Lauretta Hannon, Georgia's 'Cracker Queen' humorist
- John B. "Big John" Kennedy, Augusta, Georgia Public Safety Commissioner (1942–1946) and another "Cracker Party" boss
- Doyle Lawson, Musician known for his mandolin piece "Georgia Cracker"

== See also ==
- Atlanta Black Crackers, a Negro league baseball team (1919–1952)
- Atlanta Crackers minor league teams (1901–1965)
- Country (identity)
- Cracker (term)
- Florida cracker
