= Tampa Bay Tritons =

- City: Tampa, Florida
- Founded: 1994
- Home arena: Expo Hall
- Colors: Jade, Eggplant, White
- Murphy Cups: None
- Conference Championships: None
- Division Championships: None

Franchise history
- Tampa Bay Tritons (1994)

The Tampa Bay Tritons were a professional roller hockey team based in Tampa, Florida, United States that played in Roller Hockey International for one season. Mark Messier was the owner of the club during its short existence. His older brother Paul Messier served as the team's head coach and general manager. The club played its home games at Expo Hall in Tampa where the NHL's Tampa Bay Lightning had previously played one season.
