= Florida cracker architecture =

Architectural style

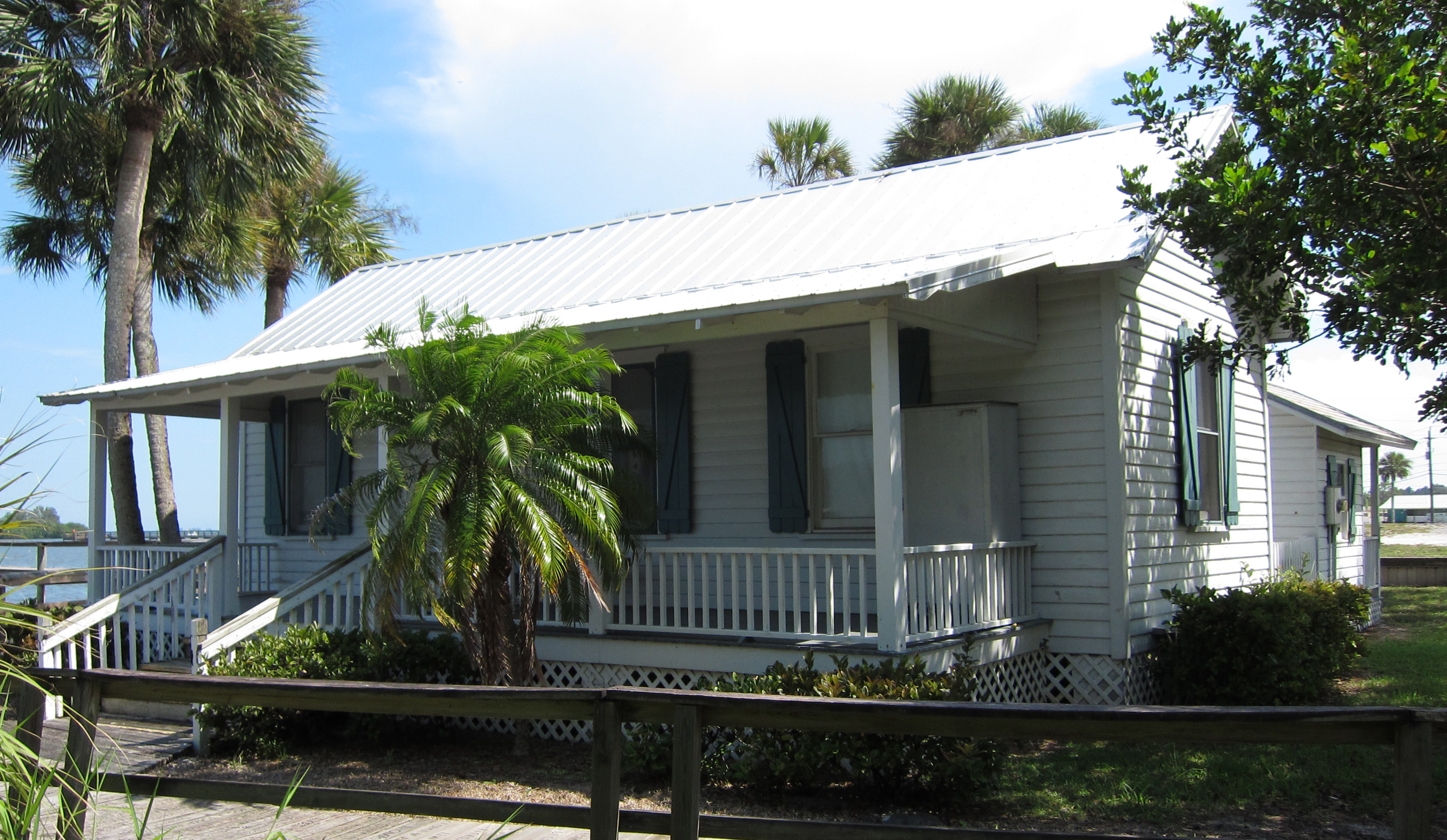
Florida cracker style house

Florida cracker architecture or Southern plantation style is a style of vernacular architecture typified by a low slung, wood-frame house, with a large porch. It was widespread in the 19th and early 20th century. Some elements of the style are still popular as a source of design themes. The name refers to colonial-era English and French pioneer settlers and their descendants. These homes were often designed with outdoor porches and large windows (with shutters) to help try to cool homes during the long hot season in these low latitude subtropical climates.

Southern plantation style borrowed some of their design and concept from the French colonial style homes built in the Caribbean and other tropical areas around the globe. The concept of raised homes on stilts and large wraparound porches not only provided ventilation and shade in the hot subtropical climate, but allowed flood waters from tropical cyclones to pass below. Another typical feature of high ceilings and large windows was also adapted to the hot southern climate. The high ceilings and large windows allowed the heat to rise and escape to through cross ventilation. Large shutters allowed a breeze when present, but kept out the hot, overhead summer sun.

Houses of this style are characterized by raised floors, a straight central hallway from the front to the back of the home (similar to open dogtrot houses) and a detached kitchen. Later, iterations of this style incorporated metal roofs. The homes were typically built with wide porches, or verandas wrapping around the entire home, to provide shade as well as additional living space. In many parts of the far southern United States, the basic concepts of this style are still incorporated in many new homes today.

== Examples ==
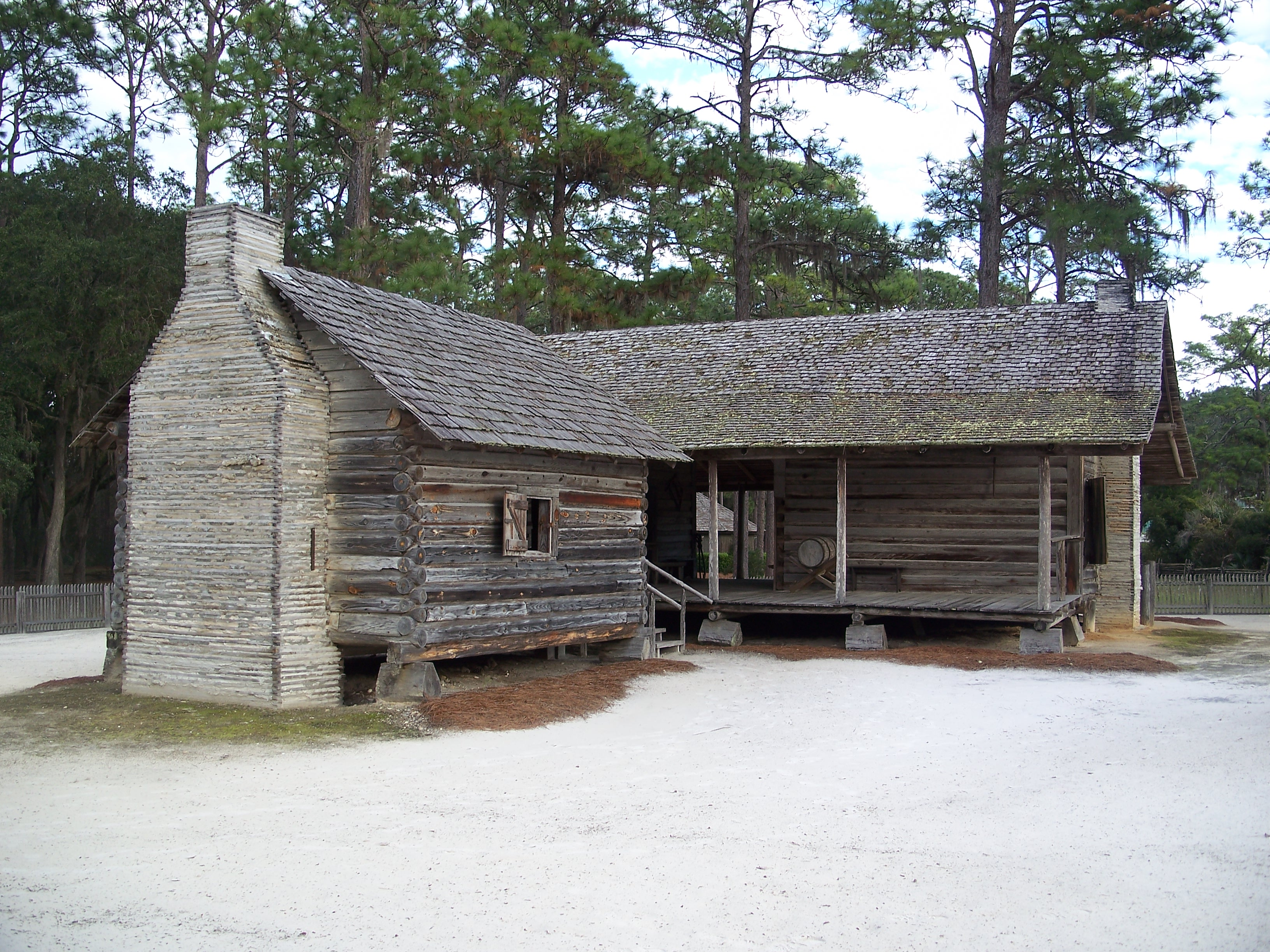
Cracker style house at the Forest Capital Museum State Park

- Big Bend Farm Buildings at the Tallahassee Museum in Tallahassee, Florida
- Cracker Homestead at the Forest Capital Museum State Park in Perry, Florida
- Florida vernacular architecture at the Cracker Country museum on the Florida State Fairgrounds in Tampa, Florida
- Capt. Francis A. Hendry House in LaBelle, Florida
- Stephens House at the Manatee Village Historical Park, Bradenton, Florida
- Old Mayo Free Press Building, the Old Lafayette County Courthouse and House of the Seven Gables in Mayo, Florida
- Bensen House in Grant, Florida
- Plumb House in Clearwater, Florida
- Winchester Symphony House in Eau Gallie, Florida
- Laura (Riding) Jackson Historic House in Vero Beach, Florida
- Asa May House in Capps, Florida
- Miakka School House in Old Miakka, Florida
- Historic Haile Homestead at Kanapaha Plantation in Gainesville, Florida
- Restored homes in Fort Christmas Historical Park in Christmas, Florida

== See also ==
- Classic Cracker, Florida's Wood-Frame Vernacular Architecture, Ronald W. Haase, 1992, Pineapple Press, Sarasota, Florida, ISBN 1-56164-013-1
- Architecture of the United States
- Cracker Gothic
