= Mount Dora Museum of Speed =

Coordinates: 28.7979°N 81.6361°W

The Mount Dora Museum of Speed was located in Mount Dora, Florida in Lake County, Florida, United States. Exhibits in the replica art deco museum included American muscle cars, automobile memorabilia and an Americana collection.

Opened in 2001, the 7,000-square-foot showroom was both a dealer showroom for classic cars and a museum with changing exhibits. Bogard opened the museum to house his collection when he and his wife retired to the area from Jupiter, Florida. In addition to rare cars, displays included quarter midget race cars, pedal cars, a 1940s Texaco gas station, vintage road signs, juke boxes, Coca-Cola machines, gas pumps, neon signs, electric guitars autographed by rock musicians including Aerosmith, Jon Bon Jovi and Stevie Ray Vaughan, autographed television memorabilia and more.

The museum closed in November 2019, selling all exhibits, due to the retirement of founder Kerry M. Bogard.

== See also ==
- Mount Dora History Museum
