= Bone Mizell =

Florida cattle herder

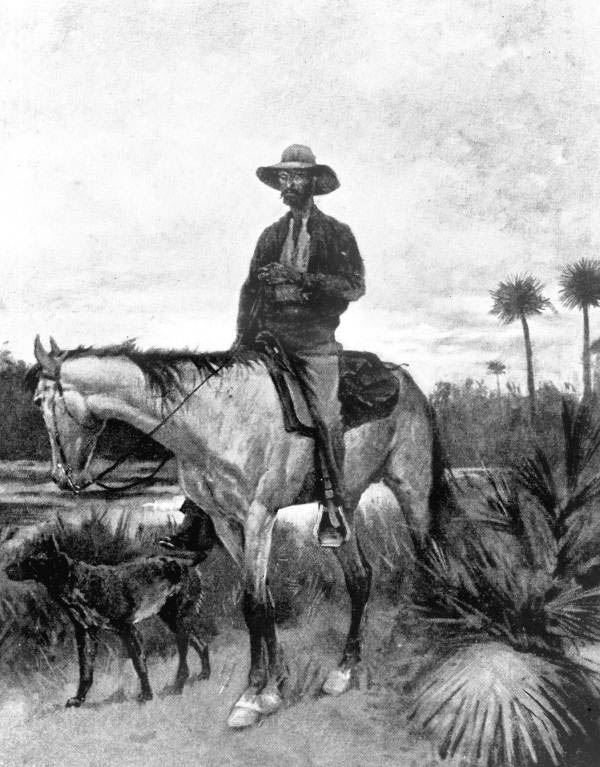
A Cracker Cowboy (1895) by Frederic Remington, depicting Mizell.

Morgan Bonaparte "Bone" Mizell (1863–1921) was a Floridian cattle herder, and one of the early Florida frontiersmen known as Florida crackers. Mizell was known for his mischievous antics, and was regarded as a fun-loving and hard-drinking entertainer. He had an impressive physical appearance, standing six feet (183 cm) tall with a "protruding chin" and "hawk-like nose". Frederic Remington depicted him in his 1895 painting A Cracker Cowboy.
