= Manatee Village Historical Park =

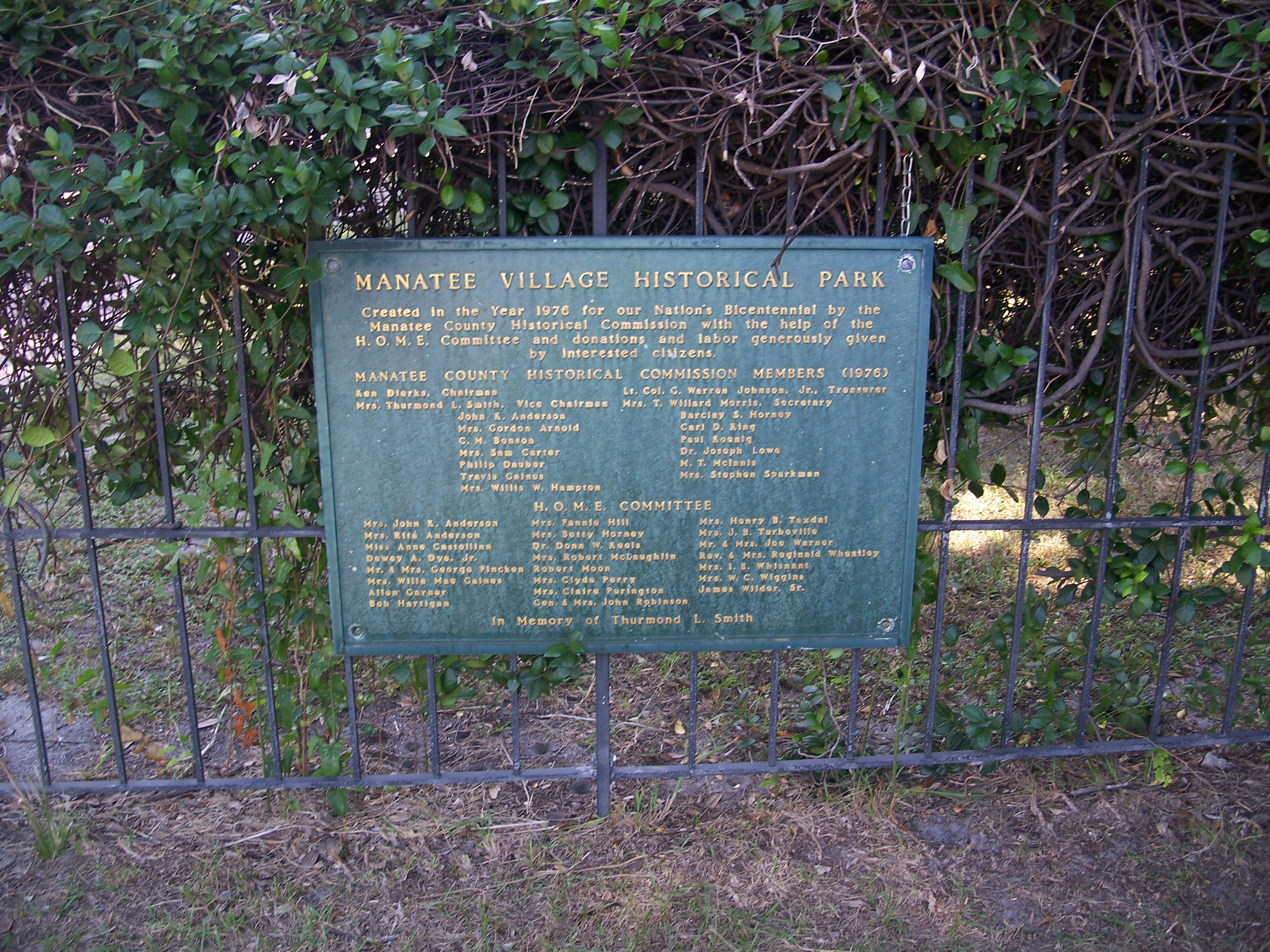
- Plaque detailing the history of the park
- Established: July 4, 1976
- Location: 1404 Manatee Ave East; Bradenton, Florida
- Coordinates: 27.4947°N 82.5480°W
- Type: Open-air museum
- Owners: Manatee County Historical Commission, Inc.
- Public transit access: Manatee County Transit Authority (MCAT)
- Parking: On site (no charge)
- Website: Manatee Village Historical Park

Manatee Village Historical Park is an open-air museum located in Bradenton, Florida, United States, at 1404 Manatee Avenue East.

== Overview ==
Manatee Village Historical Park preserves the pioneer heritage of Manatee County's founding period of 1840-1918. The historical park contains 14 preserved and replica structures representative of the founding period, including the 1903 Wiggins General Store, the Fogarty Boatworks, the 1912 Stephens House, a smokehouse, a sugar cane mill, a barn, the 1887 Methodist church, the 1908 schoolhouse, the 1860 courthouse, a Cow Hunter's bunkhouse, and a steam engine. Museum visitors can also tour the nearby 1850 Manatee burying grounds.

== History ==
In 1974, a group of women formed the Heritage of Manatee’s Environment Committee after hearing of plans to tear down two historic buildings, the 1887 Methodist church and 1860 courthouse. The Committee worked with county officials to reestablish the Manatee County Historical Commission. The Commission had both historic buildings moved to the current museum location in December 1975 and restoration efforts began. Manatee Village Historical Park was officially opened on July 4, 1976. The museum has since grown to include 14 structures.

== Structures ==
The Manatee Village Historical Park contains 14 preserved and replica structures representing the cultural heritage of Manatee County's founding period of 1840-1918:

- Old Cabbage Head: Named for its bulbous smoke stack, this 1913 train engine arrived in Manatee County in 1948 and was used to welcome visitors to Bradenton. The train engine was moved to the park in 2002.
- Wiggins Store: A general store built in 1903 by entrepreneur King Wiggins. The store was one of the first brick buildings in the area. The building was condemned in 1983, but later restored and reopened in 1990. The store contains the museum's exhibits, gift shop, and staff offices.
- Fogarty Boat Works: A boat yard built by John Fogarty and his brothers, William and Bartholomew, in 1866. The brothers started the boat-building industry in Manatee County. The boat yard was closed in 1944. The family willed the boat yard to the public in 1993.
- Blacksmith Shop: A replica blacksmith shop of the kind used by pioneers in the area.
- Turpentine Still: Turpentine production in Florida was vital for the boat industry. This still is representative of those used in the area.
- Smokehouse: The smokehouse and syrup kettle were part of a homestead located near the eastern parts of the Manatee River and were donated to the museum.
- Stephens House: A settler house built in the "Cracker Gothic" style by Will Stephens in 1912. The home was donated to the Manatee County Historical Commission. It was moved to the park in 1982 and restored.
- Outhouse: An outhouse representative of the founding period.
- Potter Barn: A replica potter barn, used to store supplies, typical of those built by Florida farmers around the turn of the century.
- Old Meeting House: Church built in 1887. The church was donated to the museum by the Manatee United Methodist Church and moved to its current location in 1975. The church was restored as a U.S. Bicentennial preservation project.
- Gazebo: A traditional gazebo, which was popular around the turn of the century.
- Old Manatee County Courthouse: Manatee County's first courthouse, built in 1860, is the oldest remaining wooden courthouse in Florida. The Manatee United Methodist Church donated the building to the museum in 1975. The courthouse was moved and restored in 1977.
- Bunker Hill School: A one-room schoolhouse built in Manatee County in 1908.
- Cow Hunter's Bunkhouse: A typical Florida-style bunkhouse that housed cattlemen or "cow hunters".

== Education ==
The park offers educational programs to the public, including school field trips, group tours (fee), the Life of a Civil War Soldier traveling trunk, guest speakers, and events. The park is also involved in Manatee History Day, an affiliate of National History Day.

== Gallery ==
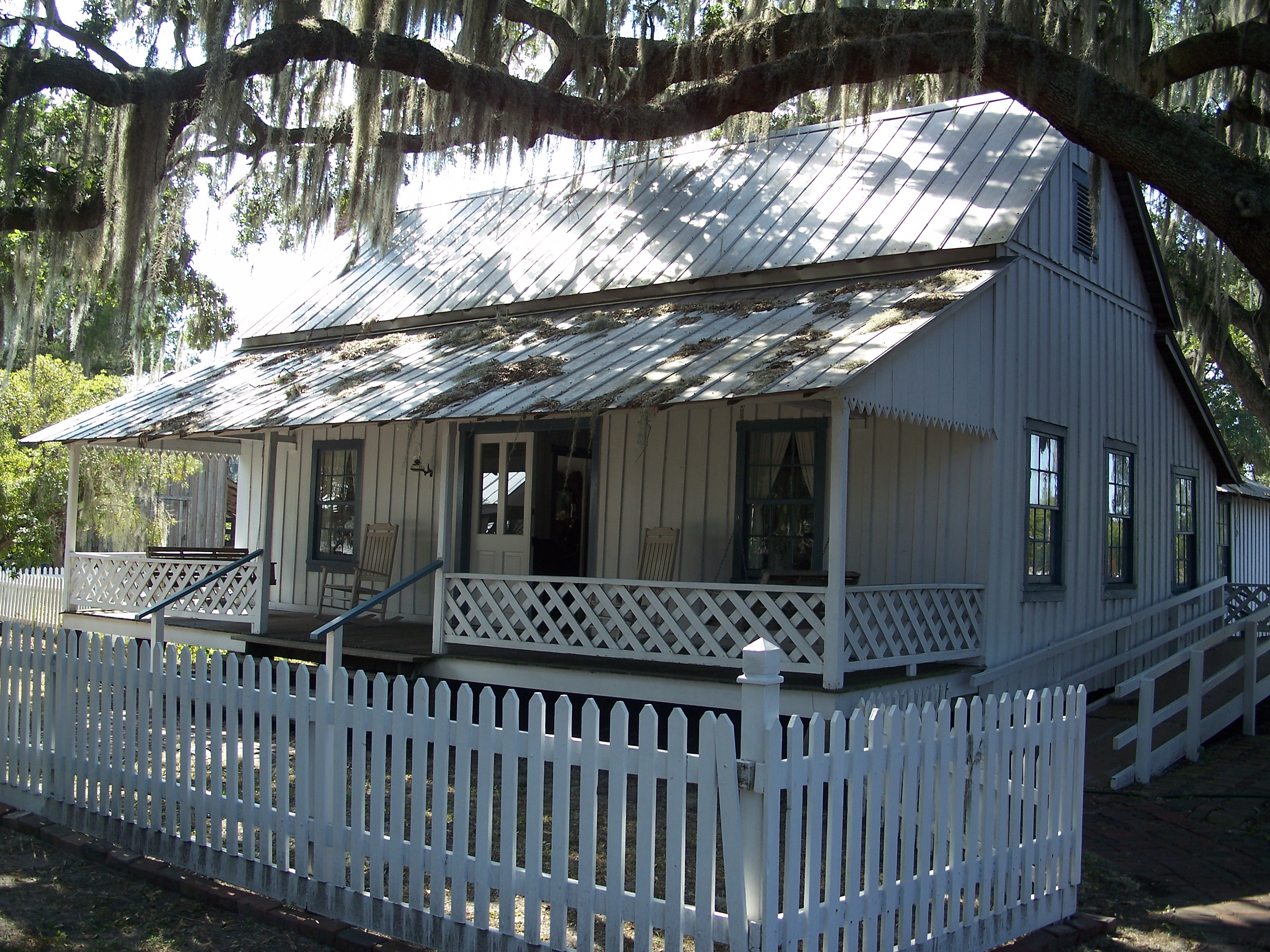
Stephens House

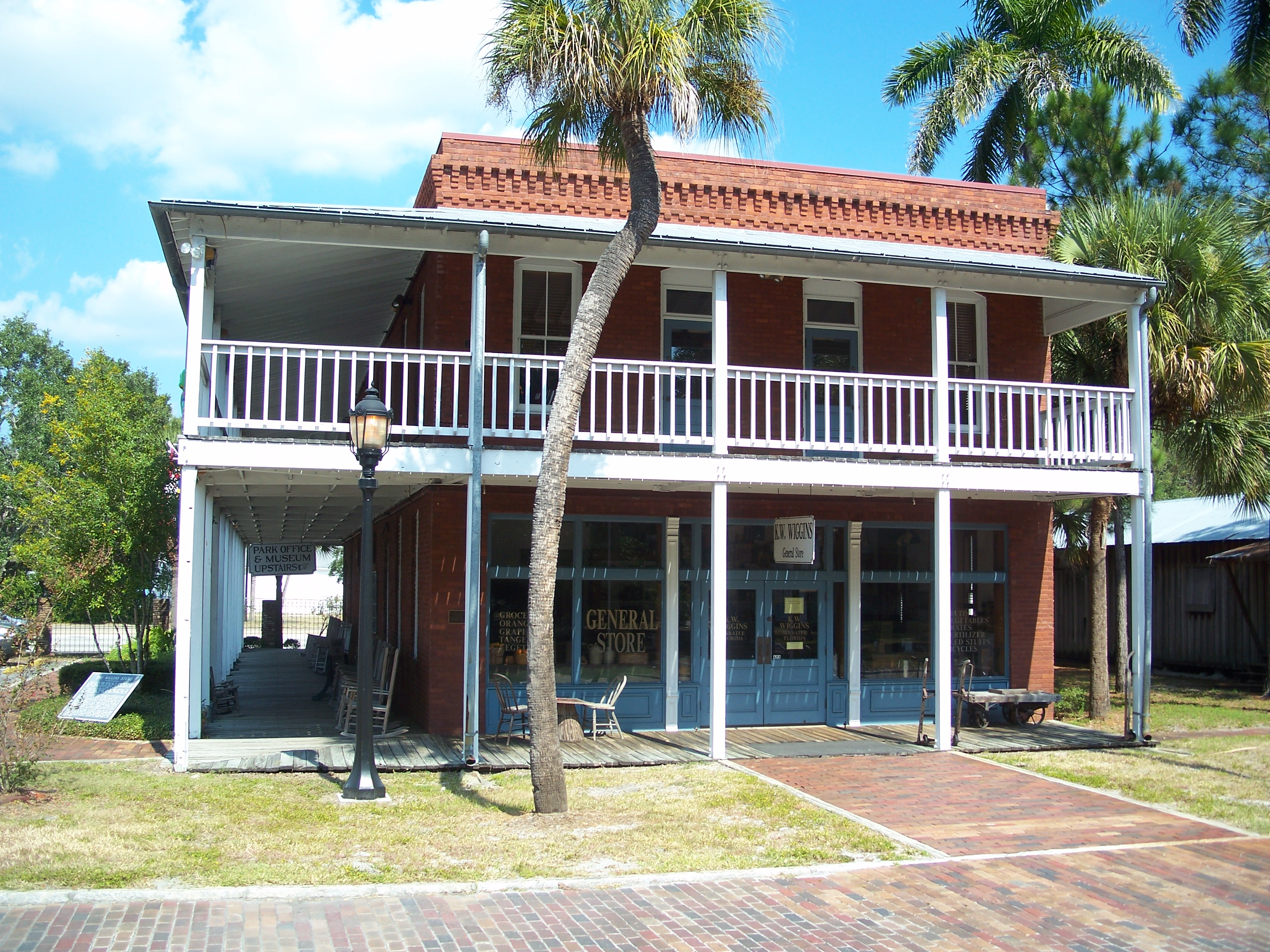
Wiggins Store

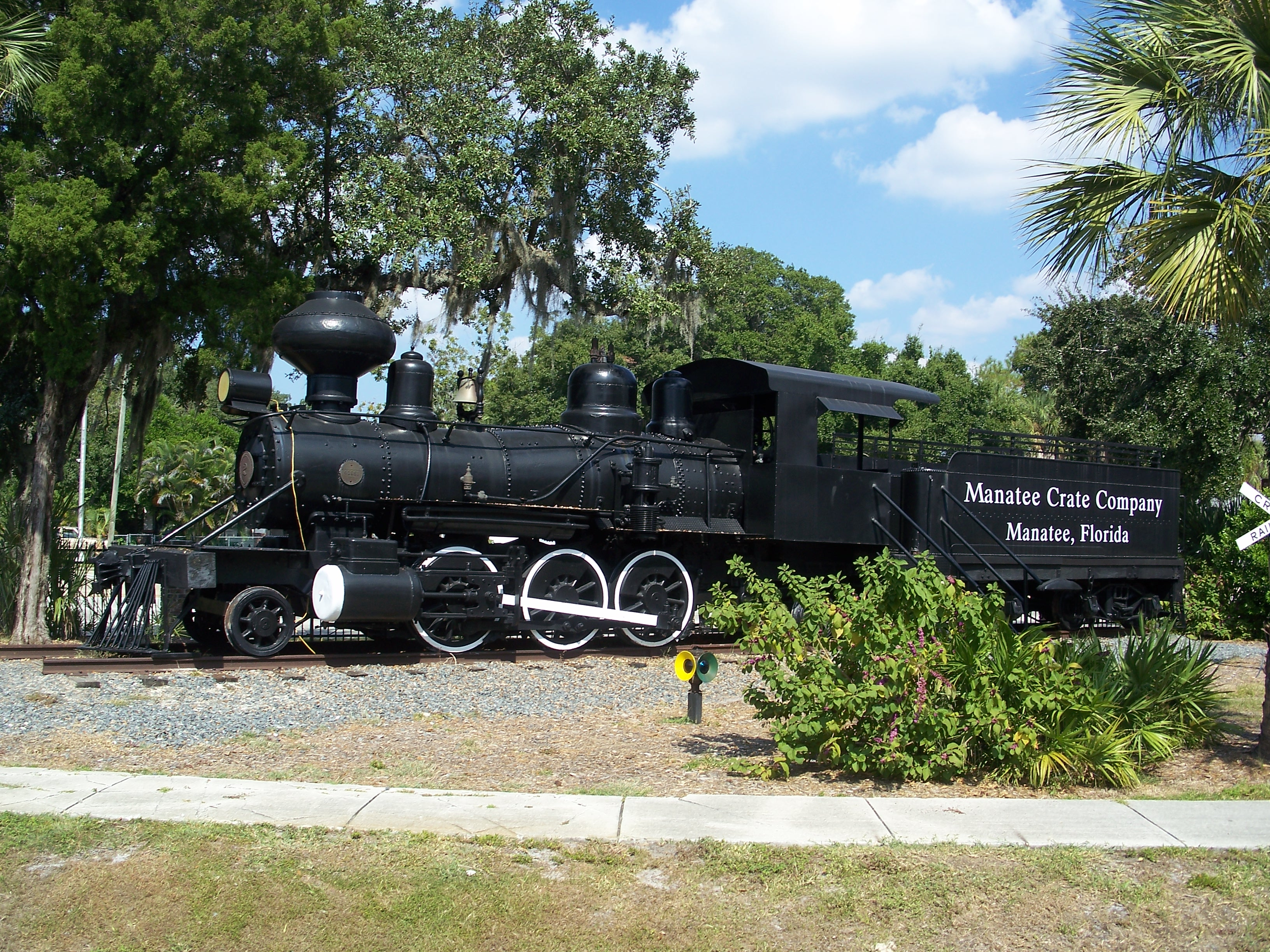
Old Cabbage Head

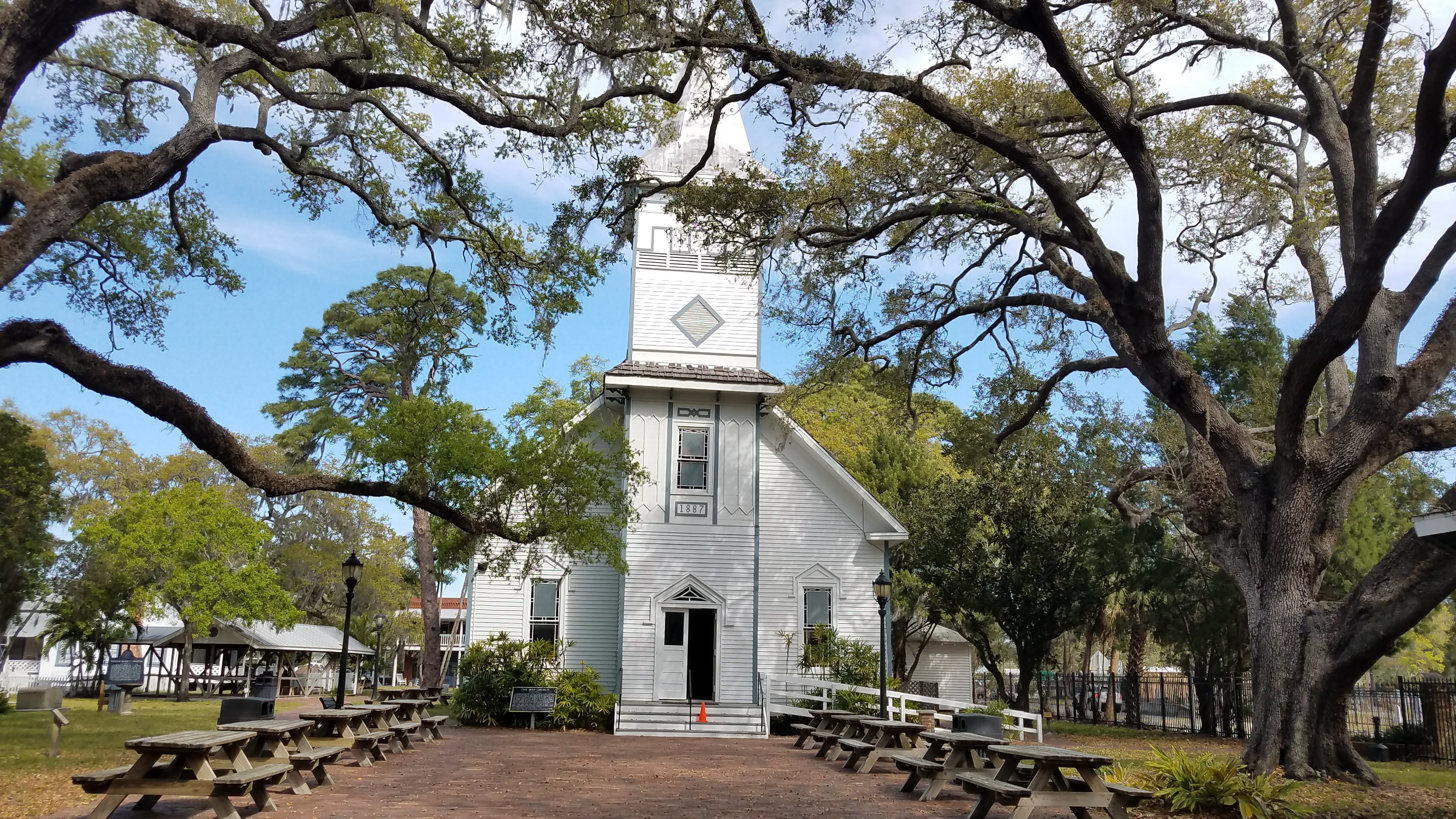
Methodist-Episcopal Church South

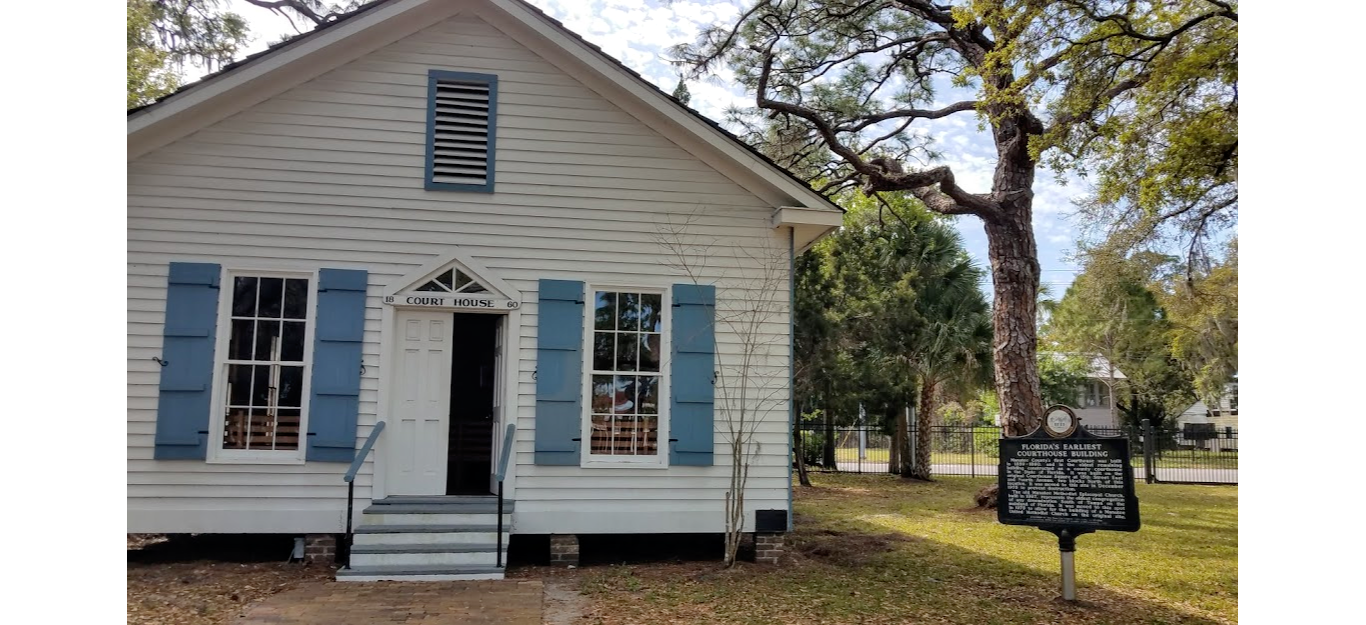
1860 Courthouse

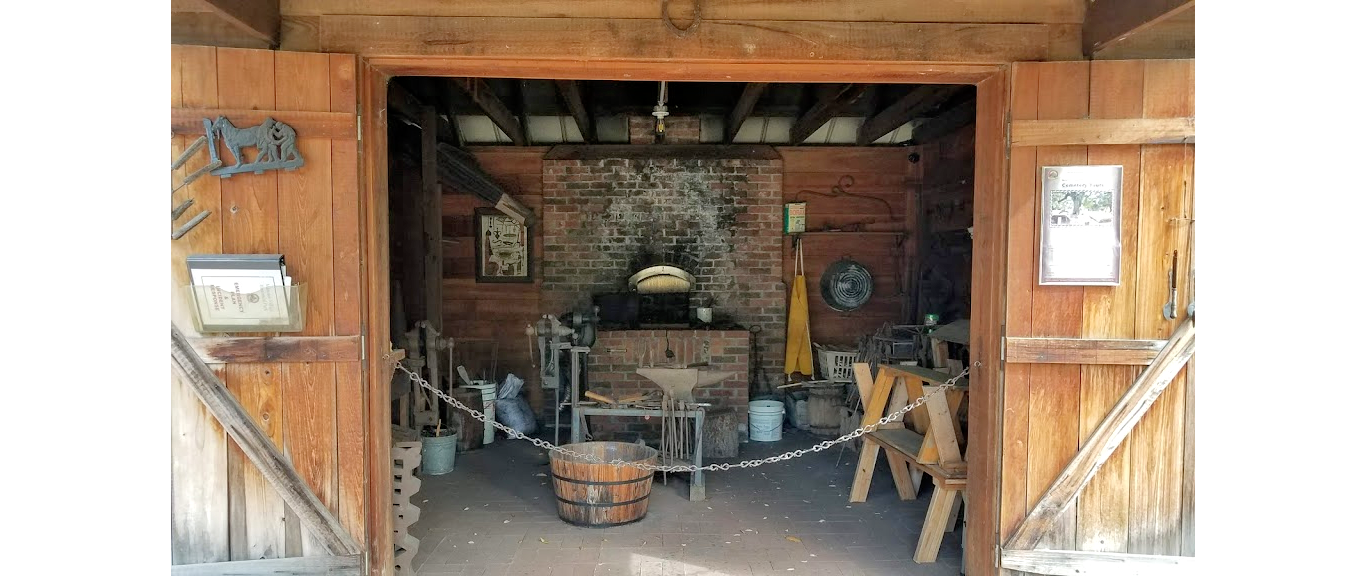
Blacksmith shop

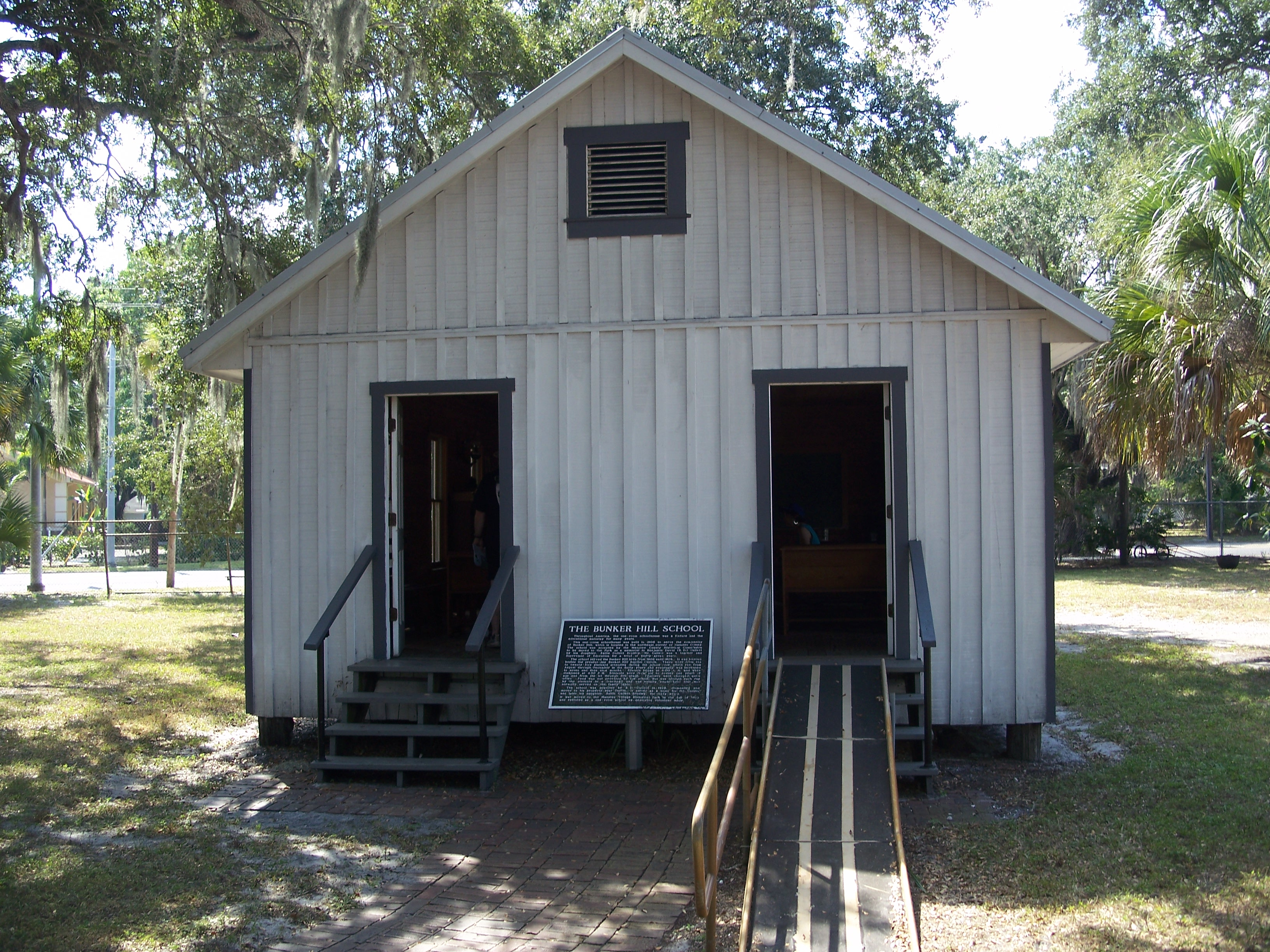
1908 Schoolhouse
