= Cracker (term) =

Racial slur directed at white people

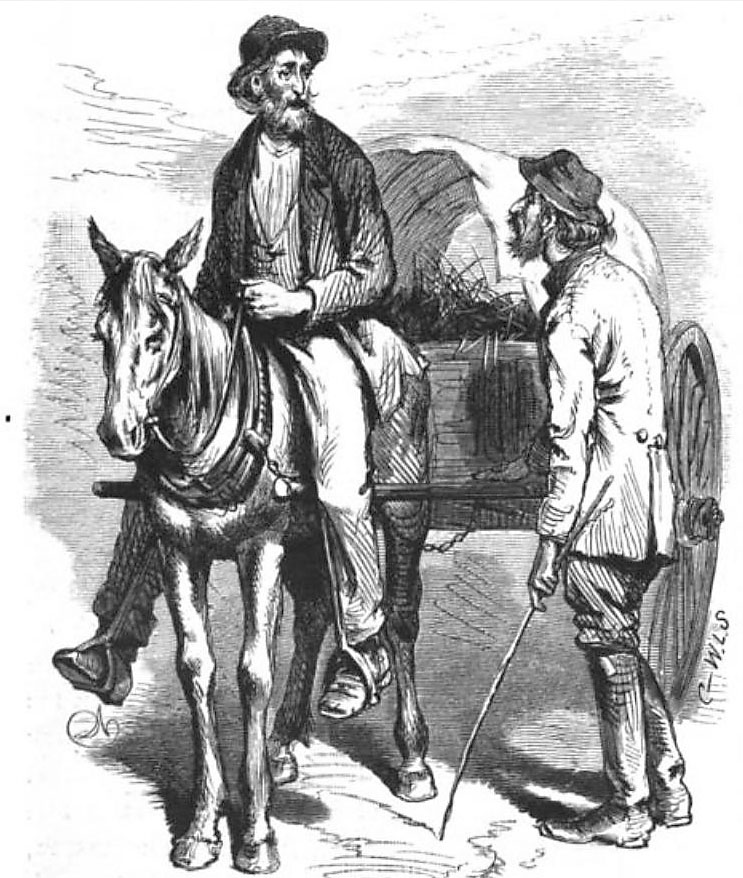
"A pair of Georgia crackers" as depicted by illustrator James Wells Champney in the memoir The Great South by Edward King, 1873

Cracker, sometimes cracka or white cracker, is a racial slur directed at white people, used especially with regard to poor rural whites in the Southern United States. It is commonly a pejorative, though is also used in a neutral context, particularly in reference to a native of Florida or Georgia (see Florida cracker and Georgia cracker).

== Origin of the term ==
The exact history and origin of the term is debated. According to one theory, it is an agent noun derived from the verb crack, meaning "to boast". The use of cracker to mean "braggart" dates back to the 16th century and can be seen for example in William Shakespeare's King John (c. 1595): "What cracker is this same that deafs our ears with this abundance of superfluous breath?"

The word was later documented describing a group of "Celtic immigrants, Scotch-Irish people who came to America running from political circumstances in the old world." This usage is illustrated in a 1766 letter to the Earl of Dartmouth which reads:

I should explain to your Lordship what is meant by Crackers; a name they have got from being great boasters; they are a lawless set of rascalls on the frontiers of Virginia, Maryland, the Carolinas, and Georgia, who often change their places of abode.

The label followed the Scotch-Irish American immigrants, who were often seen by officials as "unruly and ill-mannered." The use of the word is further demonstrated in official documents, where the Governor of Florida said,

We don't know what to do with these crackers—we tell them to settle this area and they don't; we tell them not to settle this area and they do.

By the early 1800s, those immigrants "started to refer to themselves that way as a badge of honor" as is the case with other events of linguistic reappropriation.

The compound corn-cracker was used of poor white farmers (by 1808), especially from Georgia, but also extended to residents of northern Florida, from the cracked kernels of corn which formed a staple food of this class of people. This possibility is given in the 1911 edition of Encyclopædia Britannica, but the Oxford English Dictionary says a derivation of the 18th-century simplex cracker from the 19th-century compound corn-cracker is doubtful.

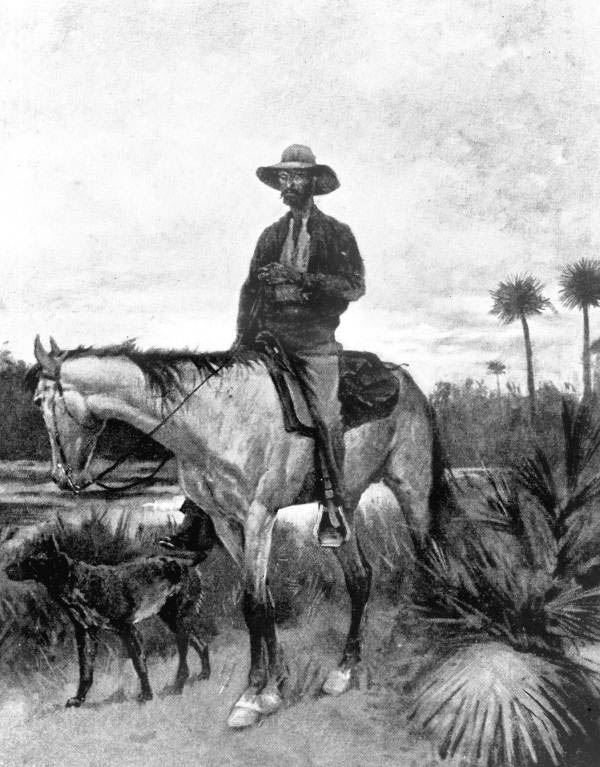
A "cracker cowboy" with his Florida Cracker Horse and dog by Frederic Remington, 1895

It has been suggested that white slave foremen in the antebellum South were called "crackers" owing to their practice of "cracking the whip" to drive and punish slaves. Whips were also cracked over pack animals, so "cracker" may have referred to whip cracking more generally. According to An American Glossary (1912):

The whips used by some of these people are called 'crackers', from their having a piece of buckskin at the end. Hence the people who cracked the whips came to be thus named.

Another possibility, which may be a modern folk etymology, supposes that the term derives from "soda cracker", a type of light wheat biscuit that in the Southern US dates back to at least the Civil War. The idea has possibly been influenced by "whitebread", a similar term for white people. "Soda cracker" and even "white soda cracker" have become extended versions of the epithet "cracker".

== Usage ==
=== Meliorative and neutral usage ===
"Cracker" has also been used as a proud or jocular self-description in the past. With a huge influx of new residents from the North, "cracker" is used informally by some white residents of Florida and Georgia ("Florida cracker" or "Georgia cracker") to indicate that their family has lived there for many generations.

Frederick Law Olmsted, a prominent landscape architect from Connecticut, visited the South as a journalist in the 1850s and wrote that "some crackers owned a good many Negroes, and were by no means so poor as their appearance indicated."

In On the Origin of Species, Charles Darwin quotes a Professor Wyman as saying, "One of the 'crackers' (i.e. Virginia squatters) added, 'We select the black members of a litter [of pigs] for raising, as they alone have a good chance of living.'"

Late 19th century cattle drivers of the southeastern scrub land cracked whips to move cattle. Many slaves and free blacks joined the Seminoles and found work in the cattle business. Descendants of crackers are often proud of their heritage.

In 1947, the student body of Florida State University voted on the name of their athletic symbol. From a list of more than 100 choices, Seminoles was selected. The other finalists, in order of finish, were Statesmen, Rebels, Tarpons, Fighting Warriors, and Crackers.

Georgia Cracker label depicting a boy with peaches

Before the Milwaukee Braves baseball team moved to Atlanta, the Atlanta minor league baseball team was known as the "Atlanta Crackers". The team existed under this name from 1901 until 1965. They were members of the Southern Association from their inception until 1961, and members of the International League from 1961 until they were moved to Richmond, Virginia in 1965.

Singer-songwriter Randy Newman uses the term "cracker" in his song "Kingfish" ("I'm a cracker, You one too, Gonna take good care of you"). The song's subject is Huey Long, populist Governor and then Senator for Louisiana (1928–1935). The term is also used in his song "Louisiana 1927" from the same album, where the line "Ain't it a shame what the river has done to this poor cracker's land" is attributed to President Coolidge.

In his 2005 essay titled "Black Rednecks and White Liberals", American economist and social philosopher Thomas Sowell argues that "ghetto" African-American culture originates dysfunctional white southern redneck culture, which came, in turn, from "cracker culture".

In 2008, former President Bill Clinton used the term "cracker" on Larry King Live to describe white voters he was attempting to win over for Barack Obama:

You know, they think that because of who I am and where my politic[al] base has traditionally been, they may want me to go sort of hustle up what Lawton Chiles used to call the 'cracker vote' there.

The Florida Cracker Trail is a route which cuts across central Florida, following the historic trail of the old cattle drives.

On June 27, 2013, in the trial of George Zimmerman concerning the killing of Trayvon Martin, a witness under examination (Rachel Jeantel) testified that Martin, an African-American, had told her over the telephone that a "creepy ass cracker is following [me]" minutes before the altercation between the two occurred. Zimmerman's attorney then asked her if "creepy ass cracker" was an offensive term, to which she responded, "No." The testimony and response brought about both media and public debate about the use of the word "cracker". A CNN report referred to the regional nature of the term, noting both that "some in Florida use the term in a non-derogatory, colloquial sense" and that it is sometimes regarded as a "sharp racial insult that resonates with white southerners even if white northerners don't get it."

=== Pejorative usage ===
One usage of the term "crackers" from 1783 described men who "descended from convicts that were transported from Great Britain to Virginia at different times, and inherit so much profligacy from their ancestors, that they are the most abandoned set of men on earth."

In his 1790 memoirs, Benjamin Franklin referred to "a race of runnagates and crackers, equally wild and savage as the Indians" who inhabit the "desert[ed] woods and mountains."

In his 1964 speech "The Ballot or the Bullet", Malcolm X used the term "cracker" in a pejorative context. In one passage, he remarked, "It's time for you and me to stop sitting in this country, letting some cracker senators, Northern crackers and Southern crackers, sit there in Washington, D.C., and come to a conclusion in their mind that you and I are supposed to have civil rights. There's no white man going to tell me anything about my rights."

On November 29, 1993, in a speech given at Kean College in New Jersey, Nation of Islam spokesman Khalid Abdul Muhammad called Pope John Paul II "a no good cracker".

In 2012, in Jacksonville, Florida, Michael Dunn murdered Jordan Davis in an argument over loud music coming from a car. Dunn alleged that he had heard the word "cracker" coming from the vehicle occupied by high school-age teenagers. This claim, along with other details in Dunn's testimony, was not substantiated by other witnesses in the criminal proceedings.

It is sometimes referred by the euphemistic contraction "C-word".

== See also ==
- Buckra
- Black Rednecks and White Liberals by Thomas Sowell
- Hillbilly
- Honky
- Jimmy Crack Corn
- List of ethnic slurs and epithets by ethnicity
- Peckerwood
- Poor White
- Social class in the United States
- White Anglo-Saxon Protestants
- White trash
