= Mount Dora History Museum =

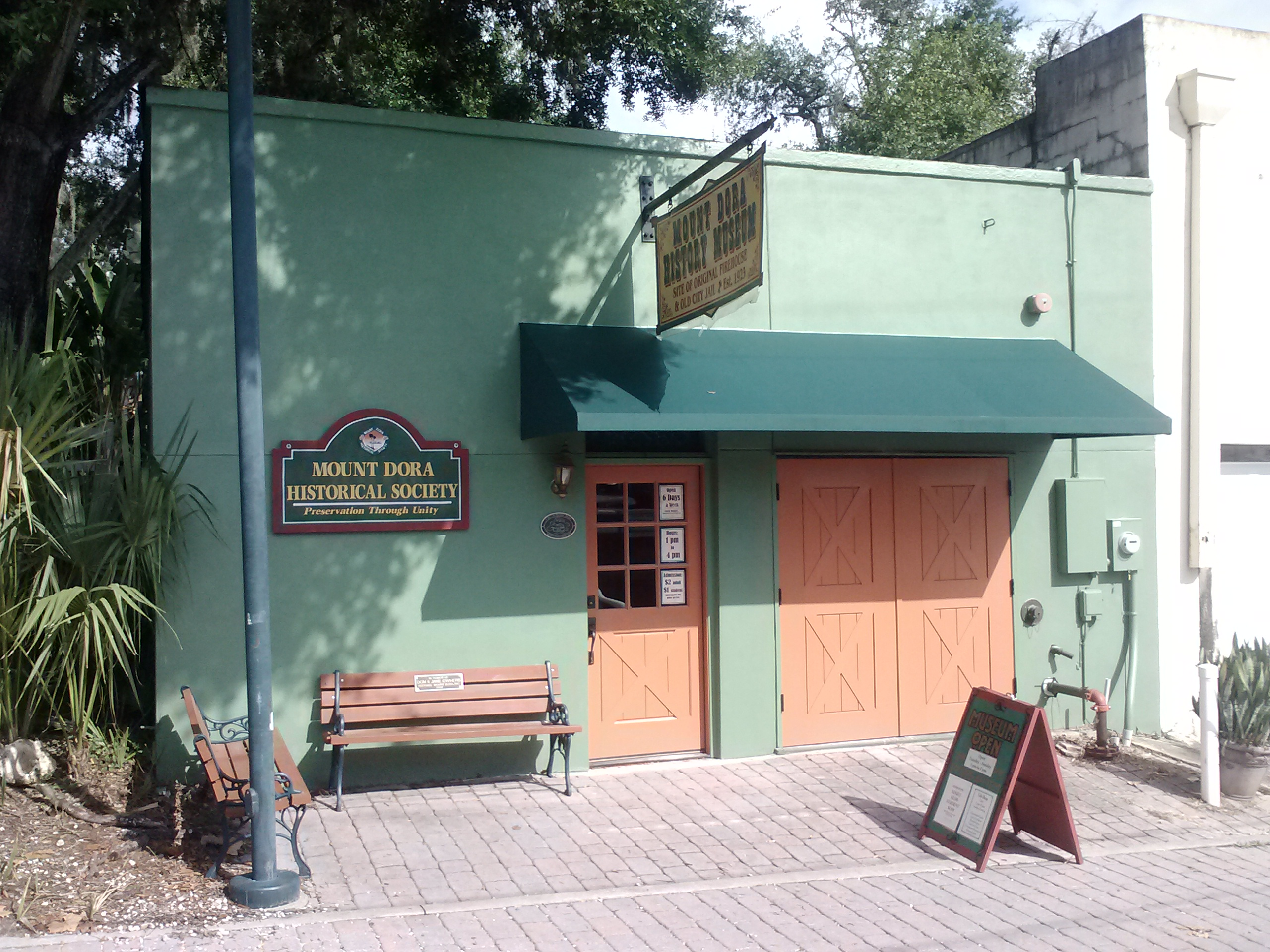
- Front of the museum

- Location within Florida
- Established: 1978
- Location: 450 Royellou Lane; Mount Dora, Florida
- Coordinates: 28.8001°N 81.6442°W
- Type: History museum
- Director: Carolyn Green
- Website: Mount Dora Historical Society

The Mount Dora History Museum (formerly the Royellou Museum) is located at 450 Royellou Lane, Mount Dora, Florida. It contains exhibits depicting the history of Mount Dora. The building itself, constructed in the 1920s, was originally the firehouse and jail for the city.

== See also ==
- Mount Dora Museum of Speed
