= Lauretta Hannon =

American humorist

Lauretta Hannon is a writer, humorist, and commentator on National Public Radio's All Things Considered.

She got her start in writing as a columnist for the now-defunct Creative Loafing in Savannah, Georgia. She began recording personal essays for Georgia Public Broadcasting's Georgia Gazette in 2000 and went on to become a commentator on National Public Radio.

Her work typically incorporates her experience growing up in the American South. She is known for combining the poignant with the humorous in her stories. She has acknowledged William Butler Yeats, William Blake, and Leo Tolstoy as influences.

Hannon has two published books: 2004's Images of America: Powder Springs and 2009's The Cracker Queen: A Memoir of a Jagged, Joyful Life. The latter work has brought her notable literary success. Her third book, a spiritual memoir with the working title Sermons for Twisted Sisters, is expected to hit bookshelves sometime in 2014.

She is currently the director of communications and marketing at Atlanta Technical College in Atlanta, Georgia. Her work in higher education marketing has garnered more than 200 national and regional awards.

== Published works ==
- Powder Springs (Images of America series; Arcadia Publishing, 2004)
- Cracker Queen: Stories of a Jagged, Joyful Life (Gotham Books, April 2009)
