= Cracker Country =

Museum in Florida, US

- Established: 1978
- Location: Florida State Fairgrounds, 4800 Hwy 301 North, Tampa, Florida
- Coordinates: 27.9885°N 82.3619°W
- Type: 19th-century living history museum
- Key holdings: 13 historic buildings
- Visitors: uncounted
- Founders: Mildred and Doyle Carlton Jr
- Florida Commissioner of Agriculture: Wilton Simpson
- Director: Cindy Horton
- Chairperson: Susanne Clemons
- Owner: Florida State Fair Authority
- Website: crackercountry.org

Cracker Country is a living history museum of rural Florida, and Florida Cracker culture which was established in 1978 by Mildred and Doyle Carlton Jr.

map of buildings in the attraction

== Features ==
The attraction showcases thirteen original buildings dating from 1870 to 1912 and is staged for the year 1898. The buildings were moved to their present location from throughout the state and have been restored and furnished with antiques of the period. The museum grounds have heirloom plants, heritage livestock and skilled artisans performing the chores and crafts of the period. Living history interpreters converse with guests and answer questions. It is located on 4 acres (1.6 ha) at the Florida State Fairgrounds campus in East Lake-Orient Park and is presented by the Florida State Fair Authority. The attraction is NOT open to the public except during the Florida State Fair, Smithsonian Magazine Museum Day, Christmas in the Country exhibition, homeschool days and tours scheduled for schools and private groups.

== Buildings ==
=== General Store ===
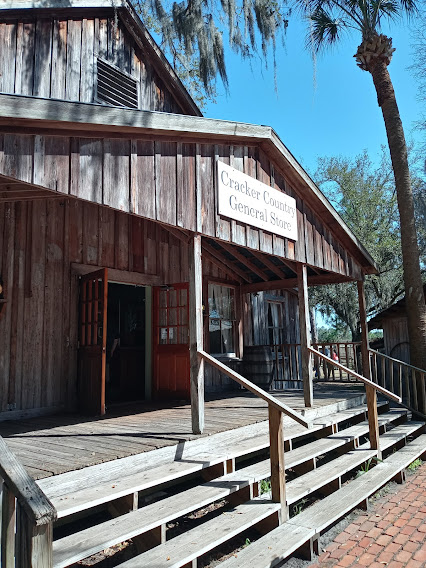
Exterior of the General Store (Rainey Store)

The General Store acts as a gift shop for visitors of Cracker Country, stocking merchandise that references or replicates items that would have been popular in the 1890s Florida town that Cracker Country emulates. Such merchandise includes stick candy, period toys and games, and home décor items. The General Store is located in the Rainey building.

==== Rainey Building ====
The Rainey Building was built in Ona, Florida, in the 1880s, where it was used as a general store and a post office. It also had a living space on the second floor, where the Rainey family raised their four children. The store prospered during Ona's railroad boom of 1911 and declined after US Route 17 was built in the 1930s. It continued to serve as a general store until the 1960s, and by the 1980s it was abandoned. The Rainey Building was donated to Cracker Country in 1988 by Reid and Gussie Rainey.

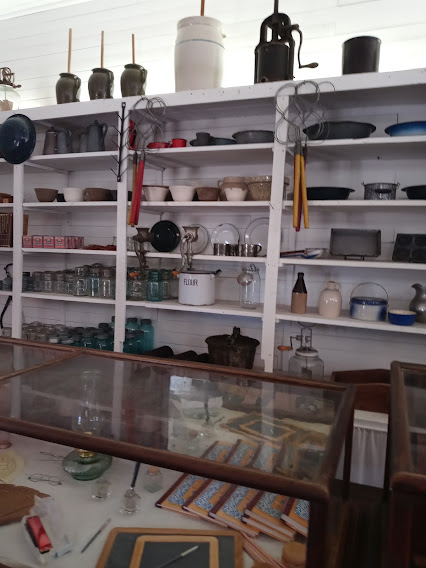
Interior of Terry Store

=== Terry Store ===
Originally known as the J.R. Terry Store, the Terry Store was built in 1891 by the grandfather of Florida's Governor, Lawton Chiles. Jack Roundtree Terry and his wife, Maude Sparkman Terry bought the store in 1920, and it served as the general store in Fort White, Florida until 1988. In 1992, Terry's sons, Jimmy and Bill Terry, donated the Terry Store to Cracker Country.

The Terry Store contains a collection of period items from the early 1900s, recreated items from that era, and living history re-enactors, who act as shop clerks.

=== Smith House ===
The Smith House was originally built to honor the marriage of Daniel H. and Elizabeth Geiger Smith, by their caring friends and neighbors, in 1894, in eastern Pasco County. The house took Mr. and Mrs. Smith's friends and neighbors three days to build. As all of the lumber used in the construction was harvested from the site, the only extra costs to build the house was for materials from the blacksmith, which cost a total of $15. The house was topped by rot-resistant cedar shingles and originally included a separate kitchen building that is not currently in Cracker Country.

The Smiths raised four sons in the house. The parents would have slept on a cot, which can be seen by visitors of Cracker Country today, and which is original to the house, and their sons would have slept on the floor in front of the fireplace. The Smiths were farmers, and once a year would have gathered their hogs from the woods surrounding their house, to drive them to Tampa to sell. The trip to Tampa would have taken a full day.

In 1945, Elizabeth Smith died, and in 1955, her husband, Daniel Smith, followed. The house was donated to Cracker Country in 1979 by the Smiths’ grandson, Willie Smith.

=== Carlton House ===
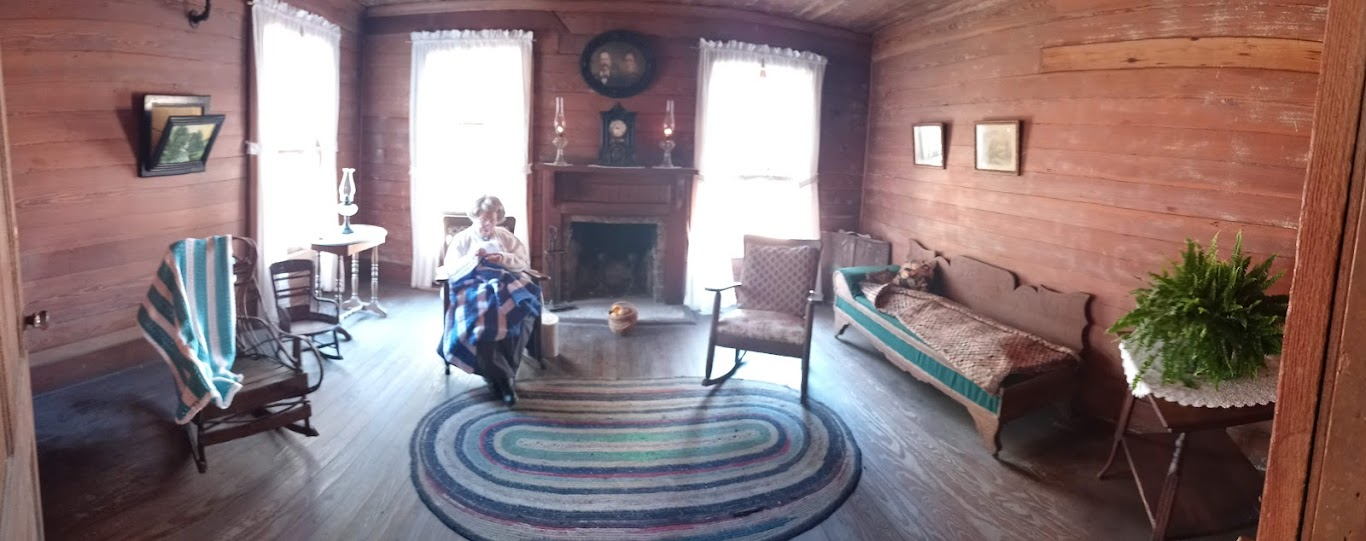
The sitting room of the Carlton House in Cracker Country, featuring a reenactor, knitting.

Built in 1885 by Albert and Martha Carlton, the Carlton House house was originally located in Hardee County, four miles west of Wauchula. The Carlton's raised ten children in the Carlton House: a girl named Ella, and nine boys. The nine boys all shared an upstairs bedroom, and Ella had her own room, upstairs as well. Neither of the children's bedrooms are visible to the visitors of Cracker Country. The downstairs rooms are visible to visitors, and are fully furnished with belongings that would have been standard in homes of that period.

During the Florida State Fair, the home is also the site of several re-enactors who educate interested visitors on the history of the home. The Carlton House was donated to Cracker Country in 1978 by T. Mabry Carlton in order to help found Cracker Country.

Albert and Martha's eighth son, Doyle E. Carlton, grew up to become Florida's 25th governor, from 1929 to 1933. Governor Carlton's son Doyle E. Carlton Jr., who served in the Florida Senate became Chairman of the Florida State Fair and founded Cracker Country with his wife Mildred in 1978.

=== Kitchen Garden ===
The Kitchen Garden is a recreation, on a smaller scale, of the kinds of kitchen gardens maintained by rural Florida settlers, and is currently located behind the Carlton House. Over 100 years ago, it would have taken a garden at least a half an acre large to feed a family of six. The kitchen garden behind the Carlton House in Cracker Country has herbs, old garden roses, heirloom flowers, and heirloom vegetables. Only heirloom plant varieties are grown in the Cracker Country kitchen garden, as they are the same variety of plants that would have been grown in kitchen gardens in the 1890s. Every year, the seeds from the plants are collected and saved for planting the following year's crops, which helps preserve the older and rarer varieties of plants for the future.

=== Smoke House ===
One of the smaller historical structures on the museum grounds, the smoke house is an original structure. It was built in Sumter County in the early 1900s and donated to Cracker Country in 1979 by the Southwest Florida Management District.

Before the age of refrigerators, the smoke house helped pioneers to keep their meats fresh and edible for longer periods of time.

=== Corn Crib Barn ===
This building was originally located in Bereah, Florida, built sometime in the 1800s. It was donated to Cracker country by an early Florida pioneer family, the Ben Hill Griffin family.

A corn crib barn was a barn built out of cypress logs, and was used by Florida pioneers to protect their corn and livestock. Today, the animal pens are home to Cracker Country's different breeds of farm animals.

=== Governor's Inn ===
Originally built in the Lily community of Hardee County, Florida in 1912, the Governor's Inn originally functioned as the community post office and general store. The building was donated to Cracker Country in 1983 by Mr. and Mrs. Pat Wilson of Frostproof, Florida.

Currently the Governor's Inn exhibits the first complete collection of oil portraits of Florida's governors, beginning with Andrew Jackson and ending with Florida's current governor, Ron DeSantis. It is for this reason that the Governors Inn got its name.

=== School House ===
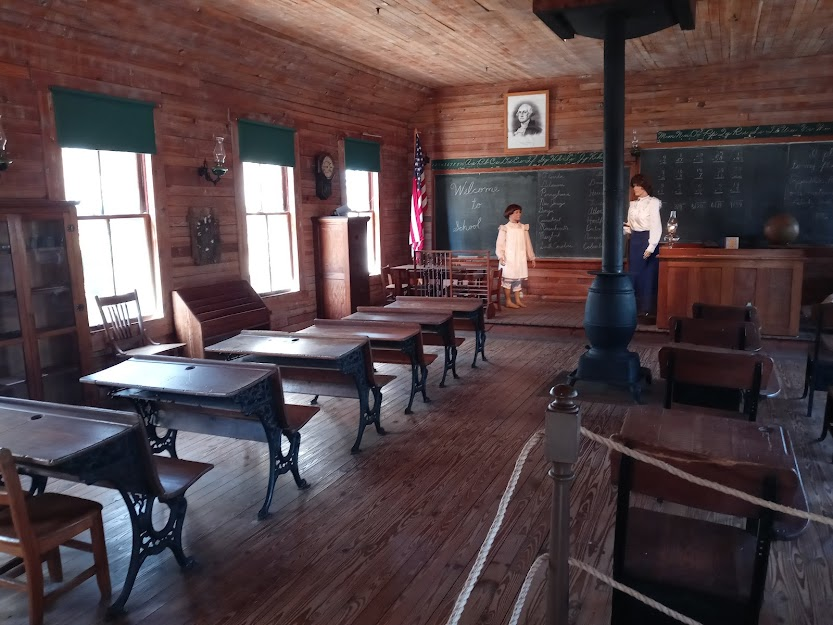
Interior of the School House, featuring animatronic teacher and pupil.

The one-room school house was built from local heart pine in 1912 in the historical town of Castalia, in what is now Hardee County. It was built on the site of an old log-cabin school house, and served as a school from 1912 to 1932. The structure was donated to the museum in 1980, along with some original furnishings.

During the Florida State Fair the school house is home not only to re-enactors, but also an animatronic teacher and animatronic students. The addition of these animatronics in the school house during the week of the Florida State Fair began in 1989.

=== Church ===
The building was built in the early 1900s in Gretna, Florida, a town that had sprung up as a turpentine town northwest of Quincy, Florida, where both white and black families were moving to and settling. This building was an originally a schoolhouse for African-American children. However, following the decline of turpentine industry and then the Great Depression, Gretna slumped. It was reincorporated in 1947 and was converted into a church since the year before Gretna's Holy Ghost Church had burned down. The church was donated to Cracker Country in 1979.

The furnishings in the church are mostly historical artifacts. The benches in the church, are original to the building. There is also a Packard Reed Organ in the church that was built in the early 1900s by the Fort Wayne Organ Company of Fort Wayne, Indiana, established in 1871. The organ is made of solid oak, with no veneers, and was donated to Cracker Country by Wayne Warren.

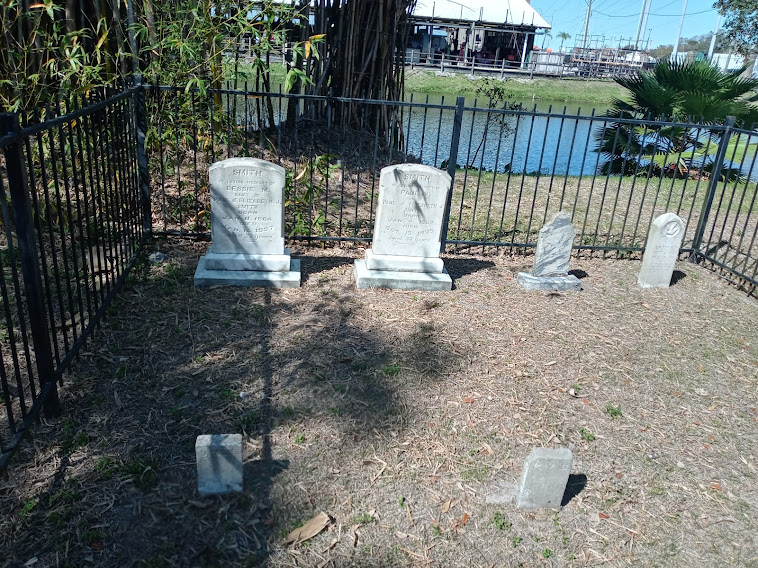
Cemetery

=== Cemetery ===
The small cemetery located next to the church is a representation of the standard cemetery from the time of Florida pioneers. The tombstones are actual tombstones from an abandoned cemetery near Okahumpka and they were moved to Cracker Country for better preservation in 1986.

=== Okahumpka Train Depot ===
The Okahumpka Train Depot was originally built in 1898, in Lake County, to serve a section of the Henry B. Plant Railroad system that stretched from Tampa, Florida to Savannah, Georgia. In 1978, the Seaboard Coastline Railroad System donated the train depot to Cracker Country, and since its donation, has been refurbished slightly, with the addition of roof shingles and platform railings.

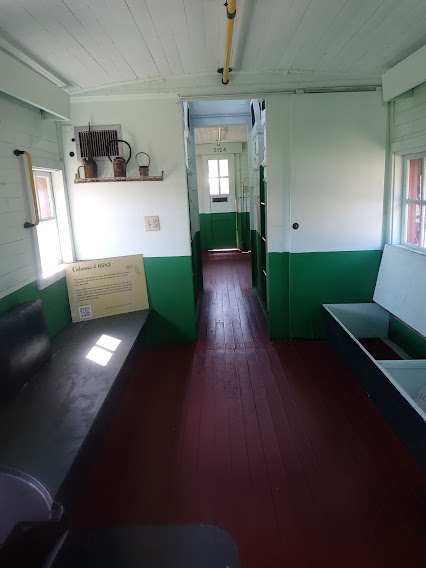
The Interior of the wooden-sided caboose.

Visitors can sit in the passenger waiting rooms and stand in the ticket office used by train passengers at the turn of the 20th century. The freight room, unlike the rest of the depot, does not recreate an accurate freight room from the early 1900s, but instead includes a 500 square foot model train display, that took over 3,000 hours of labor, built by Robert Nelson and Jim Hunter. The model train and its surrounding model town is a recreation of what central Florida would have looked like at the turn of the 20th century.

=== Caboose ===
Standing next to the Okahumpka Train Depot, positioned as if part of a departing train, waiting to be boarded, is a caboose of a wooden-sided train from the Atlantic Coastline Rail. The caboose, numbered 0583, was built in 1917. The caboose contained a coal stove, a table, a water container, a wash basin, bunk beds, tools and spare parts, and a valve for the air brakes.

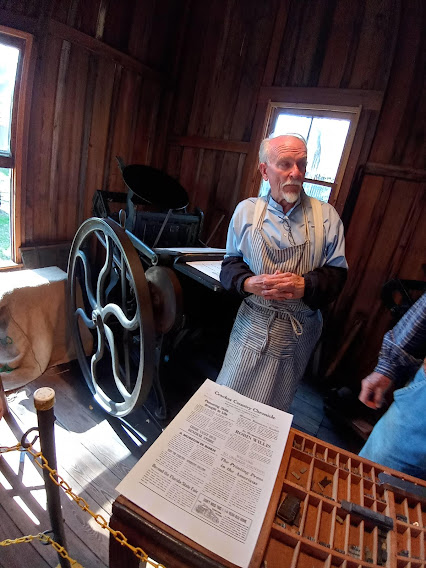
Murphy Kitchen interior, with antique printing press and reenactor.

The railroad company decided to retire the caboose in 1970, and it was then bought by Dr. James West, a physician, and the mayor of Lakeland. Dr. West used the caboose as an office, outfitting it with electricity before installing a commode, cabinets, and an examining table. In 1978, Dr. West died, and in 1983, his wife, Ellen West, donated the caboose to Cracker Country.

=== Murphy Kitchen ===
Built in the 1800s, in what used to be DeSoto County, the Murphy kitchen was originally part of the childhood home of one of Florida's senators, Henry Murphy. Senator Murphy is known for the Murphy Act, which returned tax-liened land to the private sector. The Murphy Act was created during the Great Depression.

The Murphy Kitchen was donated to Cracker Country in 1984 by James and George Murphy. Today, the Murphy Kitchen is home to Cracker Country's 1900s antique printing press. During the Florida State Fair, visitors can watch the printing press in action, and take home a souvenir Cracker Country Chronicle newspaper, and a Cracker Country postcard, both printed right in front of them. The postcard can then be taken to the Cracker Country Post Office to be stamped with a period accurate stamp.

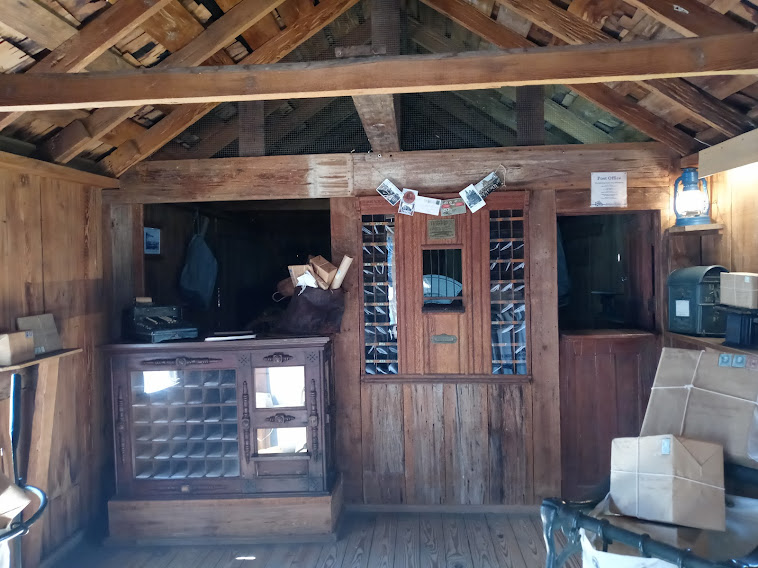
Interior of the Post Office

=== Post Office ===
The Post Office building was originally built in the early 1900s in Cumpressco in the Green Swamp near Webster, Florida. The building was donated to Cracker Country in 1980. The artifacts within the building did not come from the building itself, but were donated from other late turn of the 20th century post offices across the state.

During the Florida State Fair a reenactor is posted in the Post Office to teach visitors about the history of the building and various artifacts, and to talk to visitors about the history of post offices in Florida. The reenactors also stamp the postcards given to visitors in the Murphy Kitchen, with an official Post Office stamp from the turn of the 20th century, as a souvenir.

=== Cane Mill ===
The Cane Mill and eighty gallon syrup kettle was built in the early 1900s, and was donated to Cracker Country in 1979 by Charlie Knight of Hillsborough County.

During the Florida State Fair, visitors can see the cane mill and syrup kettle in action, and even taste the real sugar cane and freshly made syrup produced right in front of them.

=== Blacksmith Shop ===
The blacksmith shop is not an original building, but it is an accurate replica of a 1900s smithy. Visitors can see a blacksmith Crete any number of household items and tools from the period, using historically accurate methods.

== See also ==
- Florida Cracker Architecture
- History of Florida
