= Florida State Fair =

Annual event in Florida, United States

Coordinates: 27.987°N 82.362°W

- Genre: State fair
- Dates: 12 days starting on the second Thursday in February
- Locations: East Lake-Orient Park, Florida
- Years active: 1904–1917; 1919–1941; 1946–Present
- Attendance: 397,992 (2025)
- Website: www.floridastatefair.com

The Florida State Fair is held annually at the Florida State Fairgrounds in East Lake-Orient Park, Florida. The official state fair of Florida, it includes indoor and outdoor exhibits, rides and shows. It is a chance for the state to showcase its agricultural industry. The Fair also offers competitions and food oddities such as chocolate covered bacon and Buffalo chicken chimichanga. The annual event is usually held in February and typically lasts for 12 days. It is the first state fair to be held in the United States each calendar year.

== History ==
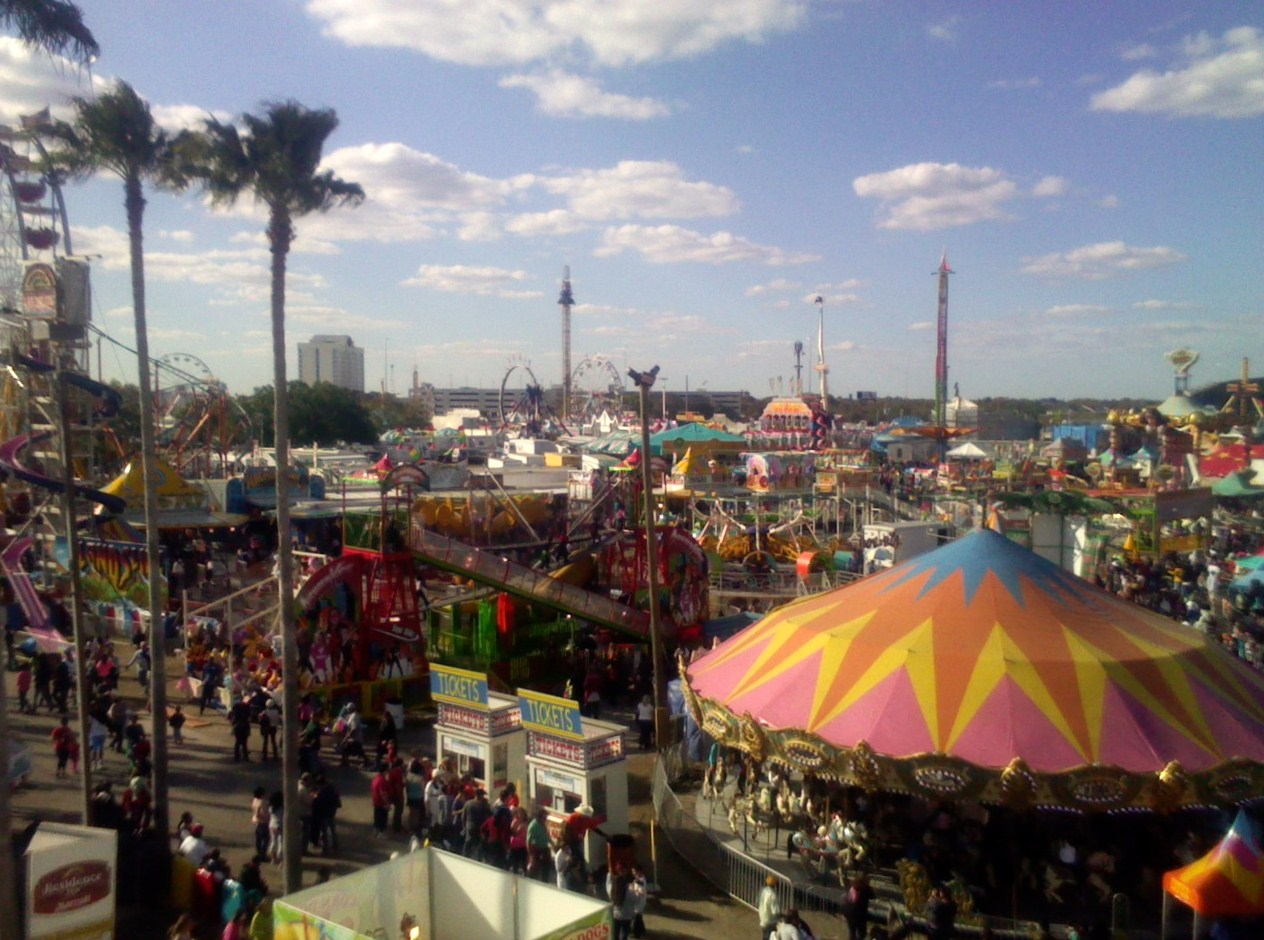
Florida State Fair in 2013

In 1904, the South Florida Fair Association was formed and plans for a new exhibition were proposed. The fair was founded as the South Florida Fair in downtown Tampa and renamed the Mid-Winter Festival a few years later. The name finally changed to the present Florida State Fair in 1915. The World Wars cancelled the fairs in 1918 and 1942–1945.

In 1975, the Florida Legislature created the Florida State Fair Authority and designated the yearly event in Tampa as the official Florida State Fair. By 1977, the first fair was held at its current location, at the intersection of Interstate 4 and U.S. Highway 301 in unincorporated Hillsborough County.

== Fair events ==
The Florida State Fair also includes competitions in crafts such as fine arts and agricultural competitions. Entries are judged and ribbons awarded. 2009 saw new additions to the state fair, including a live shark exhibit and a mechanical rodeo.

== Venues ==
Besides the rides and exhibits, other venues during the Fair include the Bob Thomas Equestrian Center, which hosts horse races and other equestrian events; Cracker Country, which demonstrates life in frontier Florida; and exhibitions from most counties of Florida plus various agricultural and other state organizations in the large Expo Hall.

At the Rabbit and Poultry Barn, fair-goers can view different breeds of rabbits and hold newborn chicks.
