= Florida State Fairgrounds =

Fairgrounds in East Lake-Orient Park, Florida

Coordinates: 27.9877°N 82.3622°W

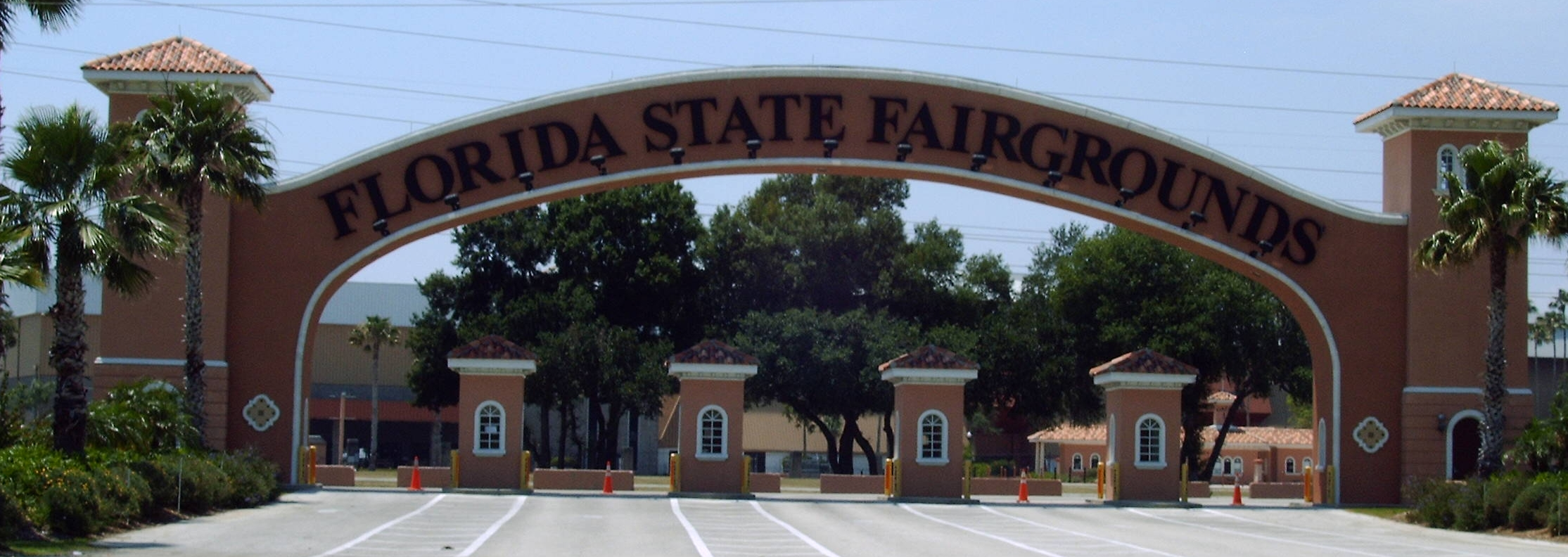
- Fairgrounds entrance
- Interactive map of Florida State Fairgrounds
- Location: 4800 US Hwy 301 North, Tampa, Florida
- Owner: Florida State Fair Authority
- Operator: Florida Commissioner of Agriculture
- Acreage: 336 acres (136 ha)

Construction
- Opened: 1977

Website
- floridastatefair.com

The Florida State Fairgrounds in East Lake-Orient Park, Florida, hosts the annual Florida State Fair and various other events. Covering 336 acres (1.36 km^{2}), it features a variety of buildings.

== History ==
Around the end of the 19th century, Henry B. Plant owned the Plant Railroad in the southeast US, as well as steamboats, the Tampa Bay Hotel, and Plant Field, the early site of sports and entertainment in Tampa. To amuse his guests, he staged numerous events there. Plant died in 1899, and the Tampa city government purchased the hotel and grounds. A few years later, the hotel was losing money and the hotel manager, T.J. Laud-Brown, proposed staging the "South Florida Fair" on the property to increase business. A Fair Association was created and plans were made. The 27-acre (11 ha) property which abuts the hotel was the site of the first South Florida Fair and subsequent fairs for 70 years. The fair was suspended in 1918 and during World War II. That property is now part of the University of Tampa. At the first fair, there were five horse races that anyone could bet on and a building for showcasing agricultural products. The fair was renamed the Florida State Mid-Winter Festival. Attendance shifted to families where the children ate popcorn and played games while the adults bragged about their blue ribbons for canned foods, pies, corn and quilts or debated farming and cooking techniques. Many of the events had ties to the 1893 Columbian Exposition in Chicago. Attendees could bet on horse races, see elephants and monkeys, exotic dancers, amusement rides, games, oddities and curiosities. Andy Huse, University of South Florida librarian elaborated:

"Not only was it the place to see two-headed animals, but it was a place to experience things you never had a chance to taste or smell. If you went to the fair in 1905, that might be the first time you tried Coca-Cola or Italian sausage. If you lived in a rural area, it might be the first time you saw an electric light bulb."

Novel food at the time were hamburgers, barbecue, hot dogs, fried fish, barbeque and ice cream. The Gasparilla Pirate Festival also began in 1904, with both events occurring together downtown for 70 years. Both were intended to attract tourists to the state and draw politicians from Tallahassee. The Gasparilla Carnival and South Florida Fair were both incorporated in 1915 and the name was changed to Florida State Fair. The Ringling Brothers Circus began wintering in Sarasota, Florida during the 1920s, so many of their performers stayed in Florida. The State Fair in Tampa and Gasparilla provided winter employment for some circus workers.

The growth and popularity of Future Farmers of America increased the number and type of animals raised and shown at county fairs. By mid-century, competition of livestock and other farm animals became a fair feature.

The Florida State Fair Authority was created in 1975 by the state legislature in Florida and they also designated the Florida State Fair as the official state fair of Florida.

In 1976 the fair moved temporarily into and around Tampa Stadium while construction continued on structures at the new fairgrounds location at the intersection of Hwy 301, Interstate 4 and East Martin Luther King Jr Boulevard. All the buildings, barns and arenas were erected at the new campus. Five acres became the Mildred W. and Doyle E. Carlton, Jr Cracker Country.

== Usage ==
In addition to the Florida State Fair for 12 days each February, the fairgrounds are used for events including the RV Supershows, The Woodworking Shows, the Suncoast Sports Fest, and Florida Bridal & Wedding Expo, Tampa Bay Boat Show, Tampa Grappling Championships, SharkCon (convention), Tampa ToyCon, Tampa TCG Trade-N-Play Convention, Florida Gun Shows, the AAHOA Florida Hotel Owner Conference and Trade Show, Tampa Bay Home Shows, National Gaming Expo, Fairgrounds Flea Markets, Citrus & Specialty Crop Expo. Cracker Country hosts 25,000 students during homeschool days, school field trips and special tours.

The fairgrounds have 150 full-hookup RV sites that can be available depending on the event.

== Structures ==
There are 16 major buildings on the property.

=== Cracker Country ===
Cracker Country is a living history museum of rural Florida, and Florida cracker culture which was established in 1978 by Mildred and Doyle Carlton Jr. The attraction features thirteen original buildings dating from 1870 to 1912 and is set in 1898. The buildings were moved to their present location from throughout the state. The structures have been restored and furnished with antiques of the period. The setting is even more realistic with heirloom plants, heritage livestock and skilled artisans performing the chores and crafting the necessities as the seasons and family changed. Costumed interpreters of living history converse with guests and answer questions.

=== MidFlorida Credit Union Amphitheatre ===
Named Ford Amphitheater when it opened in 2004, it has hosted hundreds of concerts and events. The amphitheatre has a capacity of approximately 20,000; 9,900 reserved seats and 10,000 on the grass. The naming rights were purchased by Dr. Gary Kompothecras, a chiropractor who opened an early multi-disciplinary medical clinic. Renamed 1-800-ASK-GARY Amphitheatre from 2010 to 2012. Following negative public feedback, Live Nation refused to renew the naming rights and the venue was Live Nation Amphitheatre for five months. MidFlorida Credit Union signed a 3-year naming contract and the name continues through 2025. The venue manager is still Live Nation, and as of summer 2025 the pavilion roof, which suffered severe damage by Hurricane Milton in 2024, had not been replaced.

=== Bob Thomas Equestrian Center ===
Featuring exercise grounds, rings, and 471 stalls, it hosts various horse events, including youth and Olympic qualifiers. The Stampede Premium Covered Arena is the largest structure in the center and hosts the "Ranch Rodeo Finals". The TECO Arena seats 2,500.

=== Expo Hall ===
Formerly known as the Tampa Fairgrounds Arena, the Expo Hall has been used as a home arena for various sports teams while also being used for concerts, trade shows, exhibitions, and conventions. Its most iconic notable tenant being the Tampa Bay Lightning of the NHL from 1992 to 1993.

=== Florida Agricultural Hall of Fame Building ===
The Florida Agricultural Hall of Fame (FAHOF) was founded in 1980, three years after the fairgrounds opened, but the first members were inducted that year. The building includes a permanent exhibit dedicated to preserving the history of Florida agriculture and commemorating the lives and achievements of inductees.

The facility also includes the interactive Ag-Venture, which educates third graders about agriculture during three designated weeks during the school year. At the event, children are assigned to groups designated by the color of the cowboy hat given to them and visit five stations which present different parts of agriculture with hands-on experiences.

Traditionally the fair's opening ceremonies begin with a by-invitation-only Fresh from Florida breakfast at the FAHOF building, celebrating "Florida's agricultural bounty" and sourced locally. The "Flip the Switch" event, which officially opens the fair, either precedes or follows the breakfast.

The induction ceremony for new members is part of the FAHOF Banquet held yearly at the Florida State Fair.

== See also ==
- Florida State Fair
- Expo Hall
