= Capt. Francis A. Hendry House =

Historic house in Florida, United States

- U.S. National Register of Historic Places
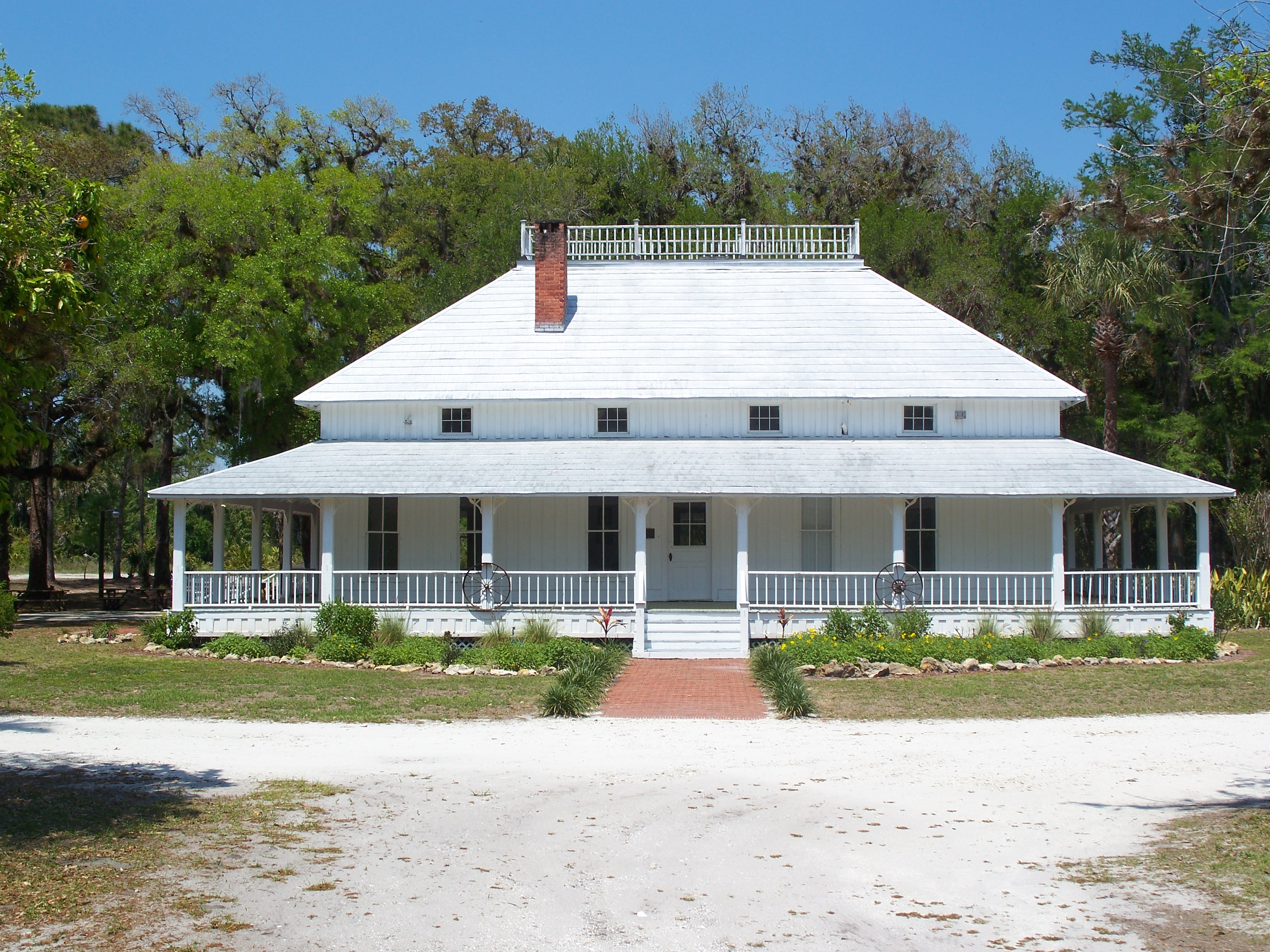

- Location within Florida Location within the United States
- Location: 512 Fraser Street, LaBelle, Florida, United States
- Coordinates: 26°45′56″N 81°26′50″W
- Area: 13 acres (5.3 ha)
- Built: 1914
- Architect: Benjamin F. Magill, John H. Magill
- Architectural style: Frame vernacular
- NRHP reference No.: 98000061
- Added to NRHP: 5 February 1998

The Capt. Francis A. Hendry House is a historic residence, built in 1914 at 512 Fraser Street in LaBelle, Florida, United States. The frame vernacular house was built for Capt. Francis A. "Berry" Hendry, a military officer in the Cow Cavalry of the Confederate States Army during the American Civil War, the city of LaBelle's founder, and Hendry County's namesake. Although Hendry had previously built a ranch house in 1873 and a two-story home in 1902, he commissioned Benjamin F. Magill in 1913 to erect him and his wife another residence, likely due to Hendry now being in his 80s.

The Capt. Francis A. Hendry House was added to the U.S. National Register of Historic Places on February 5, 1998. It is the only surviving building associated with Hendry in the county.

== History and description ==
Captain Francis A. "Berry" Hendry, a military officer in the Cow Cavalry of the Confederate States Army during the American Civil War, the city of LaBelle's founder, and Hendry County's namesake, is also the namesake of this house. Hendry had previously built a ranch house at nearby Fort Thompson around 1873 and a two-story home in LaBelle in 1902. However, in 1914, Hendry, now in his 80s, commissioned Benjamin Magill to construct a larger home for him and his wife on Fraser Street. However, the couple was only able to live there less than a year but remained the owners until selling the dwelling for $3,000 to their granddaughter, Hazel Higgenbotham Doty, and her first husband, Ross Doty in February 1916. Captain Francis A. Hendry died in 1917, but so did Ross Doty.

Higgenbotham remarried in 1919 to Evan Magill. They remained in the area and owned the house until February 1922, when they sold the residence for $2,000 and moved to Miami. The buyers, N. D. Bachman and his wife, both of Cincinnati, used the residence as a winter home. In 1941, Sarah Grant Slaton bought the house for $4,000. Slaton was the wife of former Governor of Georgia John M. Slaton and a wealthy socialite herself. John M. Slaton became owner of the home after her death in 1945. Because the Slatons did not have children, John's niece May Waldo Andrews gained possession following his death in 1955. Dr. Charles R. Andrews, Jr. then received the property after the passing of May Waldo Andrews. By 1997, the residence was owned by Caloosa Baptist Chapel, Inc.

Located at 512 Fraser Street, the frame vernacular house was built for Captain Hendry and his wife. It is the only surviving building associated with Hendry in the county. Overall, the property includes 13 acres (5.3 ha) of land. The Capt. Francis A. Hendry House was added to the U.S. National Register of Historic Places on February 5, 1998.

== See also ==
- National Register of Historic Places listings in Hendry County, Florida
