= Florida cracker =

American pioneer settler

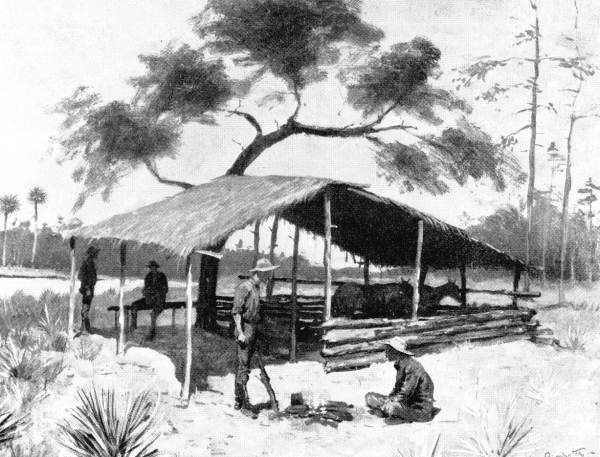

Regions with significant populations
- Florida

Languages
- Southern American English

Religion
- Christianity

Related ethnic groups
- Georgia crackers, White Southerners, Old Stock Americans, Floridanos

Florida crackers are the descendants of colonial-era British American pioneer settlers in what is now the U.S. state of Florida, and a subculture of White Southerners. The first crackers arrived in 1763 after Spain traded Florida to Great Britain following Britain's victory over France in the Seven Years' War, though much of traditional Florida cracker folk culture dates to the 19th century.

== Historical usage ==
The term cracker was in use during the Elizabethan era to describe braggarts and blowhards. The original root of this is the Middle English word crack, meaning "entertaining conversation" (which survives as a verb, as in "to crack a joke"); the noun in the Gaelicized spelling craic also retains currency in Ireland and to some extent in Scotland and Northern England, in a sense of 'fun' or 'entertainment' especially in a group setting. Cracker is documented in William Shakespeare's King John, Act II, Scene I (1595): "What cracker is this same that deafs our ears / With this abundance of superfluous breath?"

By the 1760s, the ruling classes in Britain and the American colonies applied the term cracker to Scots-Irish, Scottish, and English American settlers of the remote southern back country, as noted in a letter to the Earl of Dartmouth: "I should explain to your Lordship what is meant by Crackers; a name they have got from being great boasters; they are a lawless set of rascalls on the frontiers of Virginia, Maryland, the Carolinas, and Georgia, who often change their places of abode."

The word was later associated with the cattlemen of Georgia and Florida, many of them descendants of those early colonists who had migrated south. A folk etymology suggests that the name instead derives from the cracking of cattle-drovers' whips.

== Florida cowmen ==
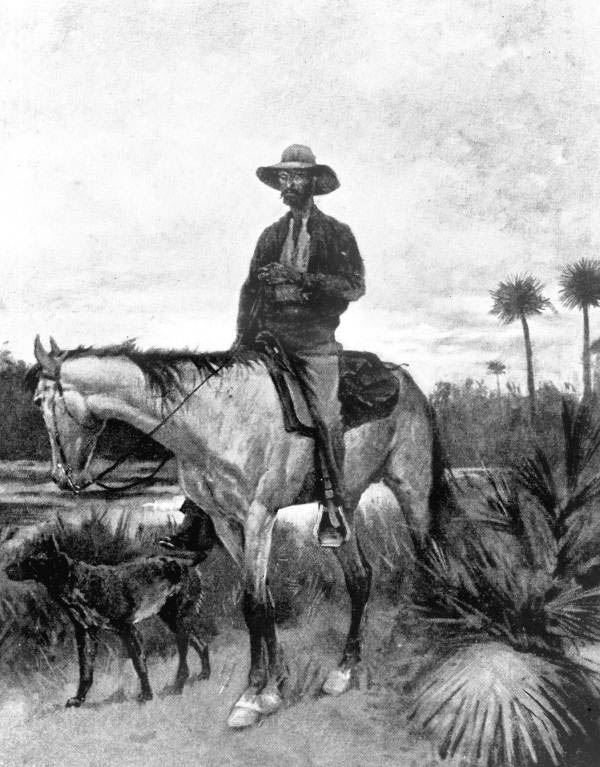
A Cracker Cowboy (1895) by Frederic Remington, illustrating cracker Bone Mizell (1863–1921)

In Florida, those who own or work cattle traditionally have been called cowmen. In the late 19th century they were often called cowhunters, a reference to seeking out cattle scattered through the swamps and wooded rangelands during roundups. At times, the terms cowman and cracker have been used interchangeably because of similarities in their folk culture. However, the western term cowboy which is often used for those who work cattle is not the common Florida vernacular as is cowman or cowhunter.

The Florida "cowhunter" or "cracker cowman" of the 19th and early 20th centuries was distinct from the Spanish vaquero and the western cowboy. Florida cattlemen's primary tools were dogs trained to work cattle and long rawhide whips to herd or drive the cattle; while also utilizing lassos to capture wild or "hairy-dick" cattle (Cracker slang for the term heretic which Spanish cattlemen used for runaway cattle on the ranches of Spanish Florida). Florida cattle and horses were smaller than the western breeds. The Florida Cracker cattle, also known as the "native" or "scrub" cow, averaged about 600 pounds (270 kg) and had large horns and large feet.

== Modern usage ==
Among some Floridians, the term is used as a proud or jocular self-description. Since the huge influx of new residents into Florida in the late 20th and early 21st centuries from the northern United States and from Latin America, the term Florida cracker is used informally by some Floridians to indicate that their families have lived in the state for many generations.It is considered a source of pride to be descended from "frontier people who did not just live but flourished in a time before air conditioning, mosquito repellent, and screens" according to Florida history author Dana Ste. Claire, in 2016, the National Director of Museums of the Heritage Tourist Department in St. Augustine, Florida, formerly Curator of History and an archaeologist at the Museum of Arts and Sciences (Daytona Beach).

Since the late 20th century, the Cracker Storytelling Festival has been held annually in the fall at Homeland Heritage Park in Homeland, Florida. 2013 marked the 25th anniversary of the festival, which includes storytellers from around Florida who come to share their stories with visitors. The majority of visitors who attend this event are students, because storytelling is part of the Florida educational curriculum. The festival also incorporates local crafts and artwork, food vendors, a whip-cracking contest, and living-history re-enactment of 19th-century homestead life.

== Notable persons ==
- Jacob Summerlin (1820–1893), aka the King of the Crackers and King of the Cracker Cow Hunters
- Francis A. Hendry (1833–1917) Florida cattle rancher, politician, and military officer in the Confederate Cow Cavalry during the American Civil War
- Bone Mizell (1863–1921) – the best known of the Florida cracker cowhunters, made famous as the subject of a Frederic Remington painting
- Ben Hill Griffin Jr. (1910–1990) – "Cracker millionaire from Frostproof, Florida"
- Al Burt (1927–2008) – journalist at The Miami Herald, and chronicler of contemporary Florida cracker subculture
- Lawton Chiles (1930–1998) – 41st Governor of Florida and self-described Florida cracker from Polk County, Florida
- William H. Whitaker (1821–1888) – Early settler of Sarasota, noted Florida cracker cattlemen and citrus grower

== See also ==
- Cracker (term) – about use of the term as a slur
- Cracker Country – a living-history village at the Florida State Fair
- Florida Cracker Architecture- regional style of architecture
- Florida cracker (disambiguation) – lists things named after the Florida crackers (architecture, trail, cattle and horse breeds, etc.)
- Florida Western – a film and novel genre set in 19th-century Florida
- Georgia cracker – the related subculture of the U.S. state of Georgia, just to the north of Florida
