= Appalachian Americans =

Ethnic group in the United States

Appalachian Americans Appalachian
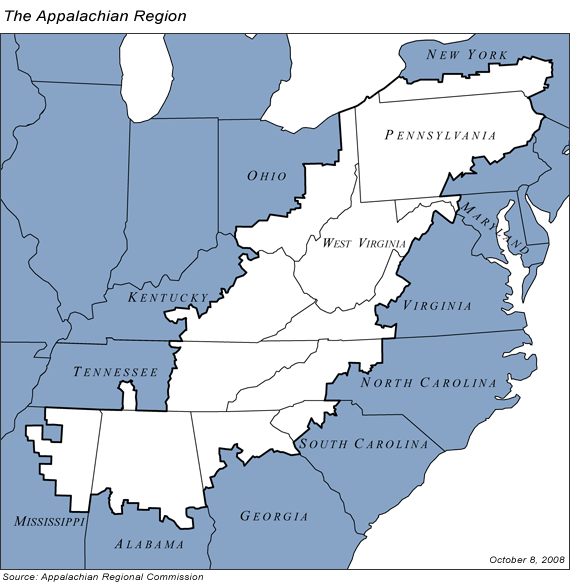
- Areas included under the Appalachian Regional Commission's charter

Total population
- 25.7 million (Appalachian Regional Commission, 2019 estimate)

Regions with significant populations
- United States, especially West Virginia, Virginia, Kentucky, Maryland, North Carolina, Tennessee, Georgia, Ohio; historical populations in Illinois, Indiana

Languages
- English (including Appalachian English)

Religion
- Southern Baptist, Methodist, Catholic, American Baptist

Related ethnic groups
- German Americans, Irish Americans, English Americans, Affrilachians, Scotch-Irish Americans, Italian Americans, Okies, Melungeons

Appalachian Americans, or simply Appalachians, are an American cultural group living in the geocultural area of Appalachia in the eastern United States, or their descendants.

== Appalachian Land ==
The Appalachian Land is known for a number of reasons. Notable attributes include having one of the oldest and largest mountain range in the world, an intense biodiversity, and rich reserves for bituminous coal.

=== Biodiversity ===
The Appalachian region is home to more than 1800 endangered species. The region is a hot spot for migration because of its connected forests that assist climate adaptation. The region is distinguishable for its wildlife and sheer number of plant species. This distinguishment allows for careers in conservation and land management, forestry and agriculture, and environmental education as well as outdoor recreation to thrive. The biodiverse land also makes outdoor activities like hiking, camping, hunting, fishing, white water rafting/ kayaking, and wildlife viewing popular.

==== Coal Industry ====
The coal industry in the Appalachian region had thrived from the 1800s through the 1970s, with its biggest surge being post civil war. The reason the coal industry deemed so successful is because the coal is generally low in sulfur and ash and high in carbon content. This is ideal for fuel, making the coal higher in desire and value. Before the crash of the coal industry, the economy of the Appalachian region relied heavily on the resource. The reliance of the coal industry and the Appalachian economy is still a healing relationship and the region has yet to recover from. The region had its own experience of the resource curse, which ultimately made it harder for them to rebound from the industries collapse. Today, the coal mining industry has been connected to shorter life expectancies of the people, increased chances of black lung disease, and detrimental financial challenges. Moreover, it has taken over 1.5 million acres of forest, compromised groundwater, and polluted waterways, these all pose health and safety threats to the people of the Appalachian region. The fight to make these issues right are long debated and still in the works.

== Demographics ==
While not an official demographic used or recognized by the United States Census Bureau, the term 'Appalachian Americans' has seen growing usage in recent years, possibly in opposition to the use of hillbilly, which is still often used to describe people of the region.

=== Tribal history ===
The historical roots of the Appalachian people is built on the tribal people of the land. The northern, central, and southern regions of the region can be traced to distinctive influential tribes. The northern tribe has Iroquois and Haydenosaunee influence, while the central region has major Shawnee Influence, and lastly the southern region has significant Cherokee influence. Due to the forced migration and further genocide of these people, it is important to honor and remember these tribes for their influence of the region. The trail of tears can give more insight on this aspect of the indigenous absence in current Appalachia.

=== Immigration and migration influence ===
The first European settlers of the region arrived in 1514 in the western part of North Carolina. This was in pursuit of cheap uninhabited land to develop into farms. In the years 1759-1771 the white population doubled in North-Western North Carolina/West Virginia. The wave of settlers that started showing up at this time were English, Scots-Irish, German, French, and Dutch. Upon the success and growth of white settlers, native claimed land was pushed back further into the interior, many native tribes allied with the British during both the American Revolutionary War and the War of 1812, leading to many massacres of "white" settlers in the South and Mid-West. This eventually led to the Indian Removal Act of 1830, which was focused on lands far to the South of West Virginia, and forced the last remaining natives from the east that refused to become American citizens, to leave for what is today Oklahoma. Almost all natives that went to Oklahoma did so rather than taking US citizenship, although over the centuries 2/3rds of the "Civilized Tribes" had integrated/intermarried into the European culture by the time of removal. Both parties thinking this would preserve native culture from being assimilated by the ever growing "white" settler majority. Today the culture of most Eastern American tribes' is still thriving in places like Oklahoma, so perhaps they were correct to move east in preservation of their culture in the face of European encroachment. The white settlers manifested a kind of 'ethnically cleansed' land, except for Africans and natives married to their partners, and their half white/native children.

== Attributes of Appalachians ==
Camp meetings are held in the summer by Methodists throughout Appalachia; depicted in Tollesboro, Kentucky is the tabernacle at the R.G. Finch Memorial Holiness Methodist Campground, which belongs to the Emmanuel Association of Churches, a Methodist denomination.

=== Education ===
Historically, the Appalachian region has struggled to obtain a stable education system that provides the people with quality education. Considering the devastating collapse of the coal industry, the education system has suffered from underfunding, extreme poverty, geographic isolation, and other cultural influences. The cycle of academic struggle has perpetuated but in recent years has begun to heal itself. With high school diploma rates rising 2% and earning at least a bachelors degree has increased to 27.3%. Despite these accomplishments, a four-year college degree remains considerably below the US average. This can be attributed to several factors including financial struggles, future mindset space, lack of knowledge on secondary-school, and desire to stay close to home. These contribute to an issue that is still in the works to heal.

Furthermore, many colleges and universities now grant degrees in Appalachian studies, as well as scholarship programs for Appalachian students. There is also an Appalachian State University.

=== Health ===
The health in the Appalachian region has too been historically disadvantaged. Similar to education, the effects of the collapsed coal industry is something this region is still recovering from. The Appalachian people are more susceptible to disease and risks while also having a shorter life expectancy. The three most occurring health issues include cancer, diseases of despair, and diabetes. These issues are most likely a due to lack of access to care, rurality, and education barriers.

=== Religion ===
The Appalachian region has great roots in Christianity and "for most Appalachians, the church is the center for social and community activities." This is suspected from the Scottish-Irish settlers in the 18th and 19th century. A large number of Methodists are present in Appalachia, with Methodist preacher Robert Strawbridge settling in Sam's Creek to preach in 1760 and erecting the first Methodist meetinghouse in America. Revival meetings and camp meetings, in which Methodists of the holiness movement preached the doctrines of the new birth and entire sanctification, resulted in the growth of Methodism in Appalachia. Today, in West Virginia, Methodists form the dominant Christian denomination in the region. A number of Appalachian People are Baptists as well, with Baptists also holding revival meetings and camp services in the region. The Appalachian region has large number of Old Order Anabaptists and Conservative Anabaptists, including denominations of the Mennonite, Schwarzenau Brethren and Amish traditions. These Anabaptists reside primarily in the Ohio and Pennsylvania region with a small population being in Kentucky.

== Culture ==
Due to various factors, Appalachians have developed their own distinct culture within larger social groupings. Included are their own dialect, music, folklore, and even sports teams as in the case of the Appalachian League.

=== Folk Art ===
The Appalachian region has many in folk art. The development of the art was due to the diversity of material that the forests of the region provide. Notable arts include weaving as well as finger weaving, natural dyeing, and Basketry. All of these arts are suspected to be influenced by indigenous people of the Appalachian region.

=== Food ===
Appalachian cuisine is known for its Native American, English, Scots-Irish, German, and African-American Influence. The dishes in the region are known for their blend of culture and reflection of influence.

=== Music ===
The Appalachian influence on music is vast. Currently, Appalachian music is mistaken as 'white' music; This assessment ignores the influence of white, black and indigenous people on the foundation of Appalachian musical roots. Instruments that the Appalachian region has rich history and influence on are the Banjo, Fiddle, Dulcimer, Mandolin, Guitar, and the Ballad Drum. Another influence of the Appalachian music scene is Ballad singing with influence of settlers from Ireland and Scotland, church hymns, and prominently, work songs of African Slaves. Today, the roots of this music manifests in the current artists with Appalachian influence.

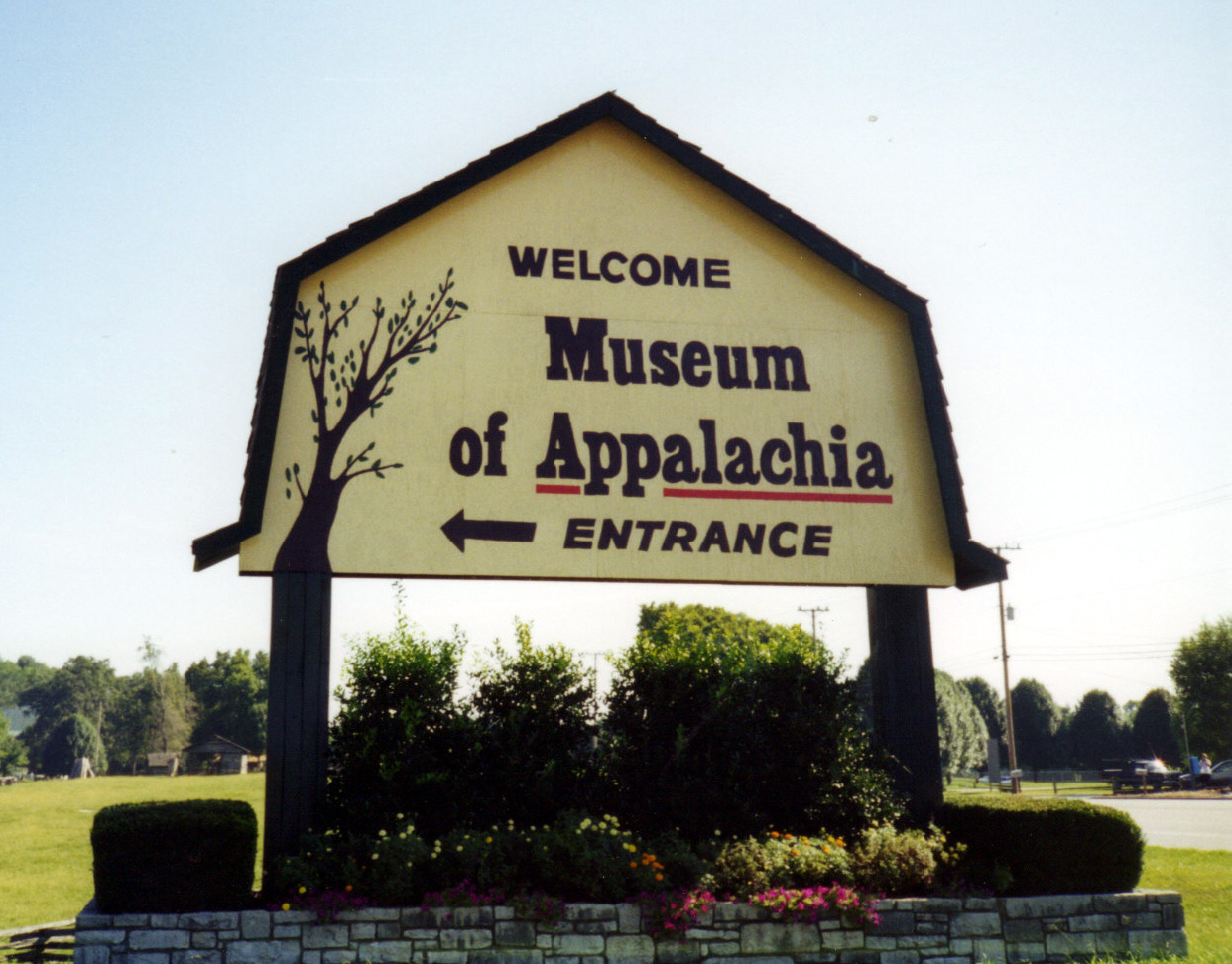
The sign of the Museum of Appalachia, Norris, Tennessee

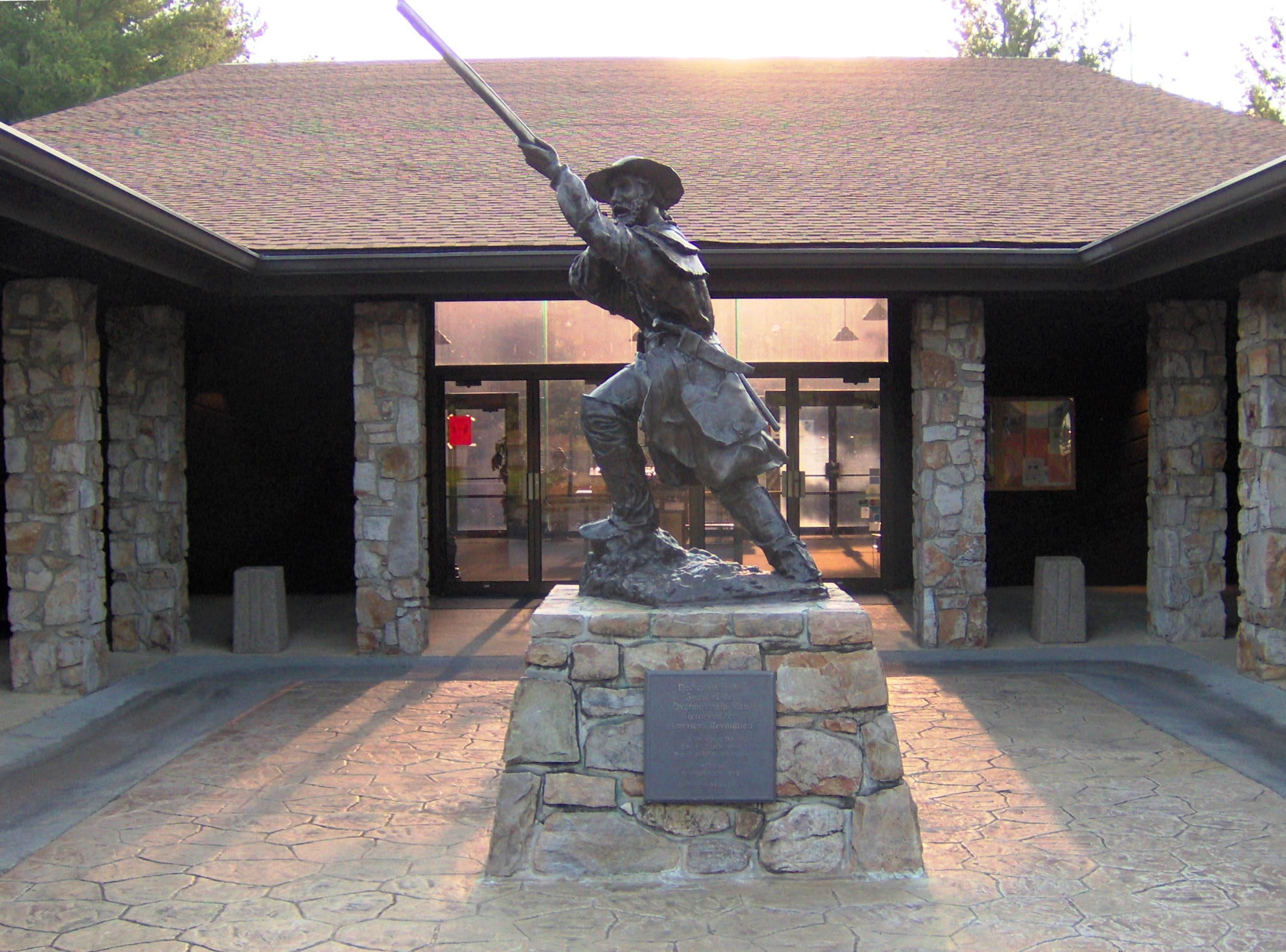
The Overmountain Man statue, by Jon-Mark Estep, at Sycamore Shoals State Historic Park, in Elizabethton, Tennessee

== Notable people ==
=== Arts and entertainment ===
- Roy Acuff (1903–1992), singer, fiddler
- James Agee (1903–1955), writer
- Brian Jordan Alvarez (1987–present), actor, comedian
- Chet Atkins (1924–2001), guitarist
- Travis Beacham (1980–present), screenwriter
- Shane Black (1961–present), filmmaker, screenwriter
- Sean Bridgers (1968–present), actor, screenwriter
- Kenny Chesney (1968–present), singer, songwriter
- Tyler Childers (1991–present), singer, songwriter
- Luke Combs (1990–present), singer, songwriter
- Eric Church (1977–present), singer, songwriter
- John Cullum (1930–present), actor, singer
- Dale Dickey (1961–present), actress
- Sierra Ferrell (1988–present), musician, singer, songwriter
- Ernest "Tennessee Ernie" Ford (1919–1991), country, pop, and gospel singer and television host
- William Gay (1941–2012), author
- Rebecca Gayheart (1971–present), actress
- Nikki Giovanni (1943–2024), poet, writer, activist
- Andy Griffith (1926-2012), actor, singer
- Dennis Haskins (1950–2026), actor
- Boyd Holbrook (1981–present), actor
- Silas House (1971–present), author
- Sierra Hull (1991–present), musician, singer, songwriter
- Samuel L. Jackson (1948–present), actor
- Steve Kazee (1975–present), actor, singer
- David Keith (1954–present), actor
- Barbara Kingsolver (1955–present), author, poet
- Johnny Knoxville (1971–present), stunt performer, actor
- Nick Lachey (1973–present), singer, actor
- Bill Landry (1950–present), actor, director, playwright
- Josiah Leming (1989–present), singer, songwriter
- Patty Loveless (1957–present), singer, songwriter
- Loretta Lynn (1932–2022), country music singer-songwriter
- Lee Majors (1939–present), actor
- Jimmy Martin (1927-2005), musician, singer
- Kathy Mattea (1959–present), musician, singer, songwriter, activist
- Cormac McCarthy (1933–2023), author, poet, screenwriter
- Bill McKinney (1931-2011), actor
- Camila Mendes (1994–present), actress
- Emma Bell Miles (1879–1919), poet, author, artist
- Jim Wayne Miller (1936–1996), poet, author, educator
- Ashley Monroe (1986–present), singer, songwriter
- Patricia Neal (1926–2010), actress
- Grace Neville (1898-1973), screenwriter
- Brad Paisley (1972–present), singer, songwriter, guitarist
- Dolly Parton (1946–2026), singer, songwriter, multi-instrumentalist, actress, author, businesswoman, humanitarian
- Margaret Qualley (1994–present), actress
- Brad Renfro (1982–2008), actor
- Emily Ann Roberts (1998–present), singer, songwriter
- Paul Schneider (1976–present), actor
- Earl Scruggs (1924–2012), bluegrass musician and banjo player noted for popularizing a three-finger picking style, now called "Scruggs style"
- Nick Searcy (1959–present), actor
- Sturgill Simpson (1978–present), singer, songwriter, guitarist, actor
- Carl Smith (1927–2010), musician, singer
- Effie Waller Smith (1879–1960), poet
- Lewis Smith (1956–present), actor
- Ralph Stanley (1927-2016), musician, singer
- Harry Dean Stanton (1926–2017), actor, musician, singer
- Chris Stapleton (1978–present), singer, songwriter, musician
- Drew Starkey (1993–present), actor
- Quentin Tarantino (1963–present), filmmaker, screenwriter, actor
- Jeremy Ray Taylor (2003–present), actor
- Marshall Teague (1953–present), actor
- Jake Thomas (1990–present), actor
- Dan Tyminski (1967–present), musician, singer, songwriter
- Andrew Kevin Walker (1964–present), screenwriter
- Doc Watson (1923–2012), guitarist, songwriter, singer
- Keith Whitley (1954-1989), singer, songwriter, musician
- Bill Withers (1938-2020), musician, singer, songwriter
- Thomas Wolfe (1900–1938), author
- Dwight Yoakam (1956–present), singer, songwriter, actor

=== Politicians ===
- Lamar Alexander (1940–present), 45th Governor of Tennessee, United States senator
- Woodrow Wilson (1856–1924), 28th President of the United States, serving during World War I
- Charles Gates Dawes (1865–1951), banker, general, diplomat, composer, and 30th vice president of the United States under Calvin Coolidge
- Jim Broyhill (1927–2023), businessman, United States representative, United States senator
- Joe Manchin (1947–present), United States senator, politician, businessman
- Thomas Massie (1971–present), United States representative, businessman, engineer
- Horace Maynard (1814-1882), United States representative, Postmaster General, abolitionist
- Shelley Moore Capito (1953–present), United States senator, educator

=== Military ===
- Thomas Jonathan "Stonewall" Jackson (1824–1863), United States military leader serving in the Mexican–American War, and later a prominent Confederate military leader during the American Civil War
- Alvin York (1887–1964), highly decorated United States soldier serving in World War I, receiving the Medal of Honor as well as numerous other awards from France, Italy, and Montenegro

=== Folk heroes and historical figures ===
- William Bean (1721-1782), pioneer, explorer
- Daniel Boone (1734–1820), pioneer, explorer
- Davy Crockett (1786–1836), frontiersman, soldier, politician
- John Gordon (1759–1819), pioneer, trader, planter, militia captain
- Devil Anse Hatfield (1839–1921), patriarch of the Hatfield family of the Hatfield–McCoy feud
- John Sevier (1745-1815), frontiersman, soldier, politician
- Popcorn Sutton (1946-2009), bootlegger, moonshiner

=== Sports ===
- Roy Williams (1950–present), college basketball coach, 3-time NCAA champion
- Jerry West (1938–2024), professional basketball player, NBA champion, Medal of Freedom recipient
- Katie Smith (1974–present), retired professional women's basketball player, 3-time gold medalist, Women's Basketball Hall of Fame
- Madison Bumgarner (1989–present), professional baseball player (SP), 3-time World Series champion, World Series MVP

=== Miscellaneous ===
- Francis Asbury (1745–1816), Methodist Episcopal bishop
- Weaver family (North Carolina), locally prominent pioneer family

== See also ==
- Affrilachia
- Appalachian stereotypes
- Appalachian Studies Association
- Appalachian Trail
- Bluegrass music
- Hillbilly
- Hillbilly Highway
- History of the Appalachian people in Baltimore
- Melungeons
- Mountain white
- Pennsyltucky
- Social and economic stratification in Appalachia
- Urban Appalachians
- Wilderness Road
