= Appalachian stereotypes =

Inaccurate impressions about Appalachian people and culture

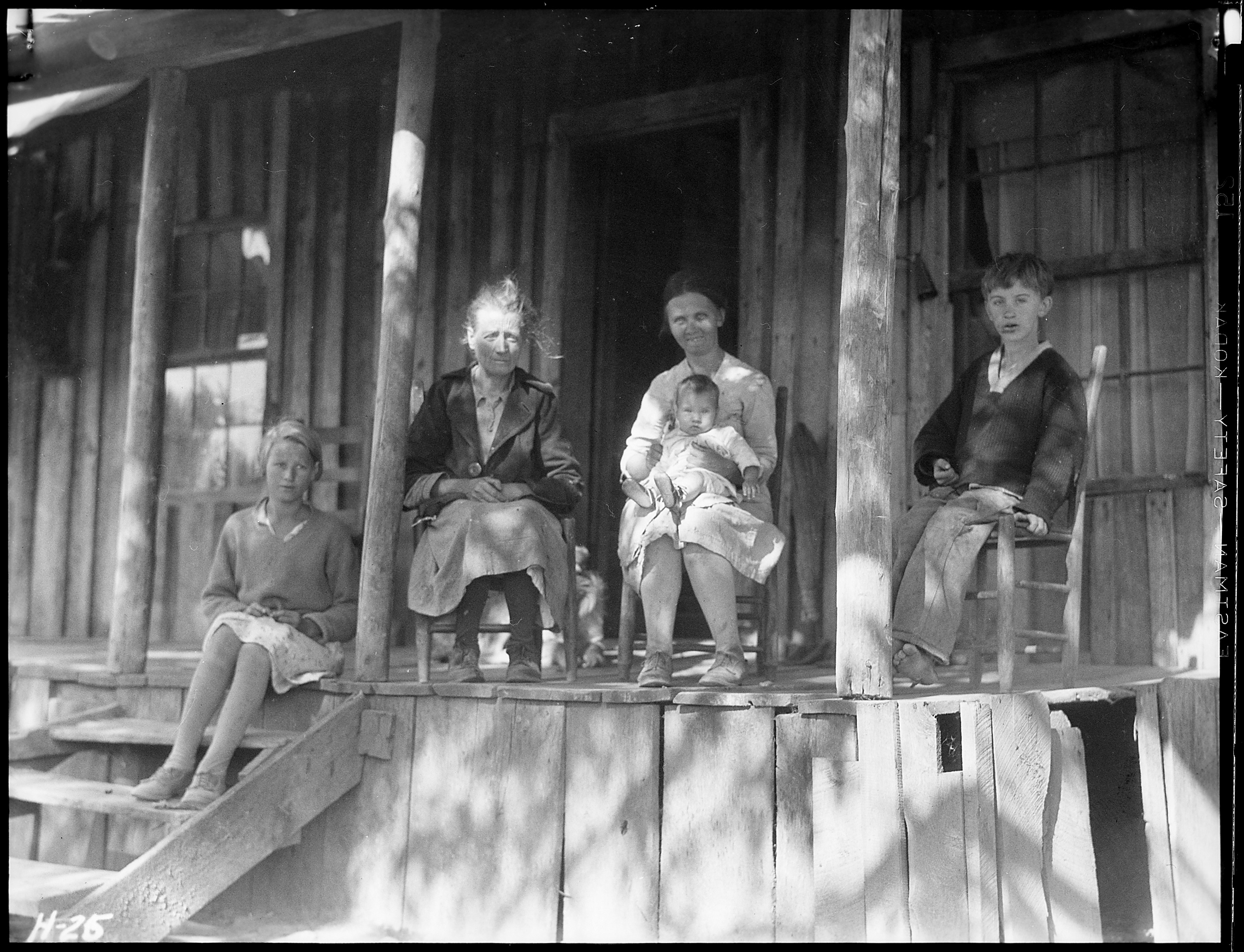
A family sitting on their farmhouse porch in the upper Tennessee Valley region of East Tennessee, c. 1933

The Appalachian region and its people have historically been stereotyped by observers, with the basic perceptions of Appalachians painting them as backwards, rural, and anti-progressive. These widespread, limiting views of Appalachia and its people began to develop after the Civil War. Those who "discovered" Appalachia found it to be a very strange environment, and depicted its "otherness" in their writing. These depictions have persisted and are still present in common understandings of Appalachia today, with a particular increase of stereotypical imagery during the late 1950s and early 1960s in sitcoms. Common Appalachian stereotypes include those concerning economics, appearance, and the caricature of the "hillbilly."

== Early development of stereotypes ==
Perceived "otherness" was the driving force behind the early development of Appalachian stereotypes. When the "discoverers" of Appalachia encountered the region in the 1870s, they found what to them was a very strange environment. Many saw Appalachian otherness as a problem that needed an explanation. As groups like the missionaries worked to bring Appalachia into the mainstream, their writings and the writings of others generated a common view of Appalachia. The popular image of the region as an underdeveloped and exotic corner of America prompted a need to justify its otherness, and the rationalizations given for this image gave way to stereotypes of the region.

While a general awareness of the Appalachia had existed, it was "discovered" by writers who helped form popularly accepted images of the region in the 1870s. One of the earliest groups involved were missionaries who aimed to save Appalachians and introduce them into mainstream Protestantism. Their mission was formed from the ideals of Kentucky abolitionist John G. Fee—founder of Berea College—who developed the vision of the antislavery mountaineer. This vision spread, and was picked up by the American Missionary Association (AMA). Promotional literature emerged to support the AMA's missionaries and their operations such as churches and schools. While the writing called Appalachians Protestants, it depicted them as having different beliefs and values from mainstream Protestants. Missionaries saw them as worthy of being saved but having critical faults such as poverty, excessive anger, and being without practical religion.

== History of Appalachia ==
The first inhabitants of the Appalachian region were Native Americans, such as the Powhatan, Saponi, Monacan, and Cherokee groups. The people of Appalachia can trace their ancestral background from the large migration of Scotch-Irish where their ancestors used to live.

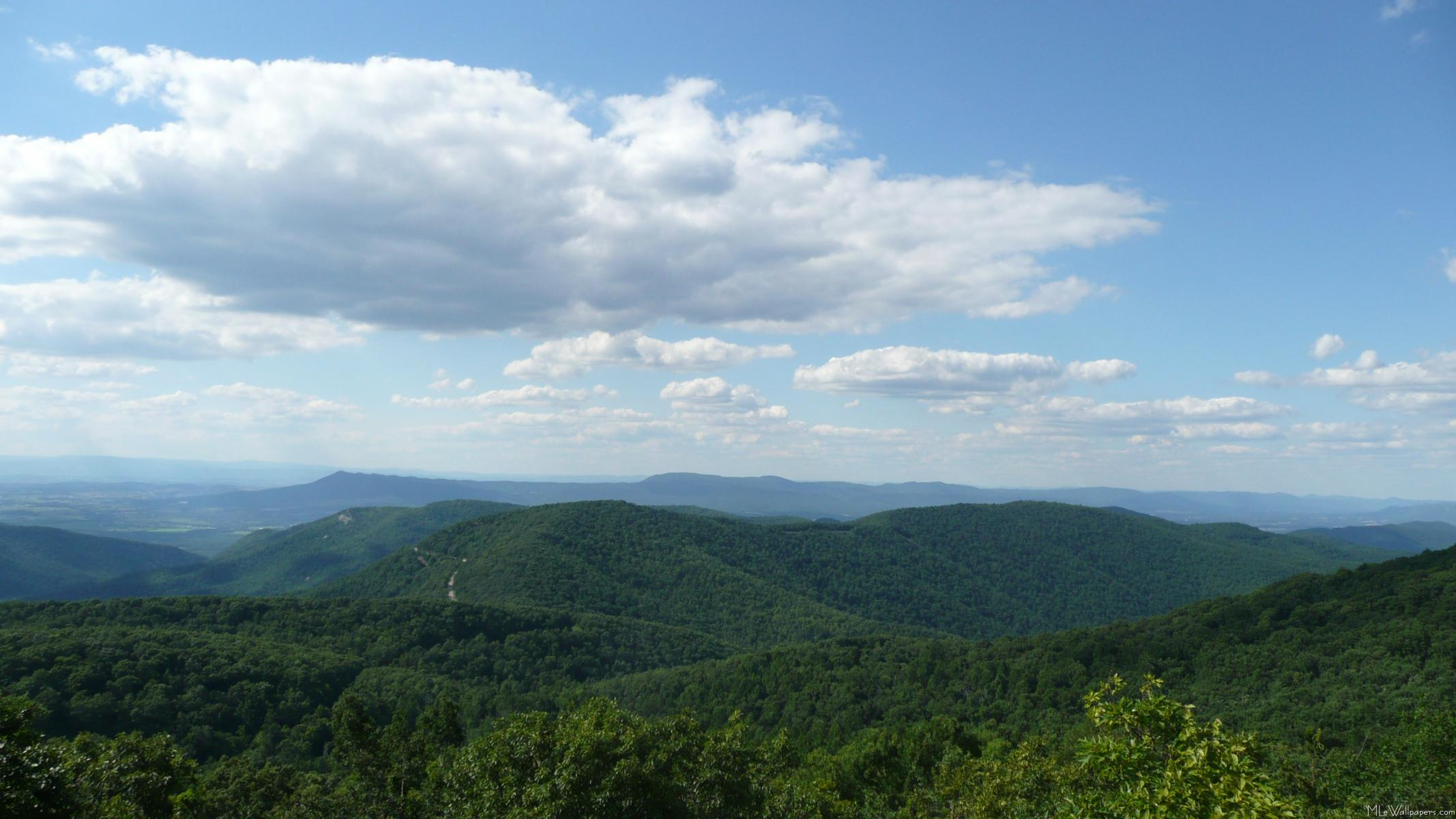
Appalachian Mountains

The Scotch-Irish moved to the region, as well as the African-Americans who were emancipated from slavery. The population kept on growing as more communities migrated to Appalachia. One of the biggest population spurts that the region ever recorded was around 1870 to 1950.

Notably, the increased population growth resulting from the expansion of coal mining attracted various immigrants. Despite there being hopes of providing a rich lifestyle to the coal mine workers, they lived under low life standards due to poverty. Miners were paid by the ton of coal produced, instead of an hourly rate. Due to this, the economy stayed poor and struggled to allow the region to prosper.

In the pre–Civil War era, the majority of the miners within the Appalachian region were of Irish, Scottish, or Welsh descent. As they struggled to deal with the low wage, workers started to create unions and benevolent societies. The Workingmen's Benevolent Society won some concessions regarding class tensions, insufficient wages, and poor living conditions, but none were enough to make significant differences. This generated violence from the miners.

After the Civil War, violence arose between the people of the Appalachian region and the state militia, causing the deaths of hundreds. Continued conflicts between the coal mine workers and the mine owners and operators caused massacres such as the Matewan massacre.

== Stereotypes of Appalachians ==
NPR describes the stereotypical portrayal of Appalachians as "children in sepia-toned clothes with dirt-smeared faces. Weathered, sunken-eyed women on trailer steps chain-smoking Camels. Teenagers clad in Carhartt and Mossy Oak loitering outside long-shuttered businesses." Other common Appalachian stereotypes include inbreeding, poor dental hygiene, poor hygiene in general, and wearing no shoes.

According to Professor Roberta M. Campbell of Miami University Hamilton, the "stereotype of the backward, barefoot, poor white hillbilly" is the most common stereotype of Appalachian people.

The traditional Appalachian dialect and accent also attracts a slew of stereotypes and consequences for those who bear it. Those with Appalachian accents or who use Appalachian dialect are perceived to be less educated and less wealthy. There is also the incorrect theory that Appalachian English is closely related to Elizabethan English, or that it has not progressed far past Elizabethan English. These stereotypes harm the access to opportunities and impressions of Appalachian people outside of Appalachia. As a result of these negative stereotypes, thousands of people from the Appalachian region face judgment and intense scrutiny on a daily basis.

An appraisal called "Community Action in Appalachia" during the War on Poverty found that the population of those who wanted a change in how they lived was split into two. The group helped provide community centers throughout Appalachia, with hopes of allowing individuals to become more educated and view other, newer technologies created by society. Some embraced the new ideals and modernism provided by the community centers, and others rejected them with the thought that government intervention was not needed within their area. After the appraisal was finished, only small instances of development were recorded across the counties, but nothing of significant change. This created a new view on Appalachia, and it caused many to believe that the Appalachians simply did not want to change and did not embrace new parts of modern society.

Most of these stereotypes originate from historical cultural patterns. The rough look of those who live in the Appalachian region comes from times in the late 1800s when Appalachia was hit with a depression due to economic overexpansion, decrease in money supply, and a stock crash. It also arises from the appearance of miners, who would come home looking very dirty and worn due to the conditions they were subjected to in the mines. After the appraisal "Community Action in Appalachia", the public started to view the region as underdeveloped and stuck in the past. Due to the fact that the region is heavily dependent on labor jobs, a majority of people do not feel the need to go past a high school education, thus supporting the stereotype that Appalachian individuals are uneducated.

== Discrimination against Appalachian individuals ==
Discrimination against Appalachians is significant enough that some municipalities, such as Cincinnati, have enacted laws making it illegal to discriminate against peoples of Appalachian identity. The Human Rights Ordinance policy was passed in 1992 by the City of Cincinnati, which explicitly proclaimed it forbidden to discriminate against characteristics such as race, national origin, sex and religion. Before the policy was declared, the U.S. District Court declined the admission of Appalachians in the Civil Rights Act of 1964.

Appalachia's social, cultural, and economic features establish an identity that consistently defines characteristics that infuse prejudices and distinguishes them from other minority groups. The Appalachians are often victims of locational prejudice, where people often discriminate against due to their location and where they identify as home. The people of Appalachia are stereotyped as the poor White minority, tending to fuse Appalachia into one community, one state, which would make Appalachia the third largest state in the nation due to population.

Derogatory language against Appalachians includes the terms "Redneck" and "Hillbilly." These terms often come up in comedic use, stereotyped as the role of the "hillbilly fool". The term "Hillbilly" was first coined in 1899, around the time coal industries made an appearance in the Appalachian communities. In reference to Appalachia, the utilization of the word "Hillbilly" has become such a commonplace that the term is often used to characterize the sociological and geographical happenings of the area. A major example of this occurrence is the characterization of the emigration of residents of the Appalachian Mountains to industrial cities in Northern, Midwestern, and Western states, primarily in the years following World War II as the "Hillbilly Highway". The term Redneck is often met with pride among mountain people.

For many years, the term "Mountain Whites" existed as an official Library of Congress Subject Heading. Criticized for its false representation of Appalachia as a racially homogeneous region and because it was a term applied by outsiders to a group of people who do not necessarily identify as a specific ethnic group, it was replaced with the subject heading "Appalachians (people)".

Within the region, discrimination against women is also a very big issue. Due to Appalachia being known for their coal mining industry, it makes it difficult for women to find well-paying jobs. Many women have to settle for working "unskilled" labor.

== Representations of Appalachians in popular culture ==
- The 1972 film Deliverance is set and filmed in the Appalachian mountains of Georgia. It features negative stereotypes of Appalachian people, portraying the people as inbred, backwards, and dangerous. It depicts the region's poverty and explores Appalachian stereotypes. The 2012 documentary The Deliverance of Rabun County explores how the film affected the people in the region, and how they felt about their portrayal. Many of those interviewed for the documentary felt resentment for the way in which they were portrayed.
- The horror series Wrong Turn, consists of seven individual movies released between 2003 and 2021. Each film in the series is set in various locations throughout rural West Virginia and follows the story of a group a travelers who get lost in the backwoods of the Appalachian mountains. Stereotypes of Appalachia are most depicted in the film as the inbred and cannibalistic monsters who hunt and kill the group of travelers throughout each movie.
- The Duke boys in the feature-film version of The Dukes of Hazzard state that "actually, we prefer to be called Appalachian Americans" when a group of urban (Atlantan) African Americans calls them "hillbillies" in response to their Confederate flag and perceived blackface.
- In the 1991 horror film The Silence of the Lambs, Jodie Foster stars as FBI Agent Clarice Starling, who is from a small town in West Virginia. The villainous Hannibal Lecter uses her Appalachian upbringing as psychological leverage, mocking her accent, asking if her father was a coal miner, and telling her that she is "not more than one generation from poor white trash". Starling's character also appears in the 2001 sequel, Hannibal, as well as the 2021 television series Clarice. Her character is adapted from the books The Silence of the Lambs and Hannibal by Thomas Harris.
- Starting in 2004, Saturday Night Live had a recurring sketch called Appalachian Emergency Room, which drew on negative stereotypes of rural Appalachians. Seth Meyers, Maya Rudolph, Kenan Thompson, Amy Poehler, Darrell Hammond, and Chris Parnell all appeared regularly in the sketches. Notably, Johnny Knoxville appeared in one sketch.
- In 2004, Abercrombie & Fitch released a shirt that said "It is all relative in West Virginia," alluding to the Appalachian stereotype of inbreeding and incest.
- The FX TV series Justified (2010–2015), which was set in Harlan, Kentucky, featured various "unsavory characters" running afoul of the law, including "a moonshine-making Appalachian matriarch of a law-defying hillbilly family" and the Dixie Mafia. The series received praise from some critics for its complex characters that went beyond stereotypes.
- The MTV reality television series Buckwild, which ran for one season in 2013, has received criticism for painting the young adults of Appalachia in a bad light—the most notable of this criticism being a letter from West Virginia Senator Joe Manchin to the president of MTV written a month before the show aired.
- The memoir Hillbilly Elegy by JD Vance received substantive attention upon its publication in 2016. Vance was elected vice president in 2024, and is a leader in the Trump coalition. His book twice topped The New York Times Best Seller List, but it has also been criticized for overextending generalizations of Vance's individual experience to all of Appalachia. In 2020, Netflix released a film adaptation of Hillbilly Elegy directed by Ron Howard. It has been criticized for many of the same issues as the book.
  - Often positioned as a direct challenge to the generalizations of Hillbilly Elegy, historian Elizabeth Catte published What You're Getting Wrong About Appalachia in 2018. In the book, Catte asserts that "the story of Appalachia cannot be separated from the story of the United States and the historical forces that have shaped us."
  - In 2019, scholars Anthony Harkins and Meredith McCarroll co-edited an anthology called Appalachian Reckoning: A Region Responds to Hillbilly Elegy through West Virginia University Press. The anthology features writing from a number of authors across the Appalachia region.
- The War on Poverty legislation launched by President Lyndon B. Johnson, aimed to eliminate America's poor conditions, had published images of impoverished Appalachians in order to gain financial support. Appalachia was one of the major focuses for nationwide assistance.
- Katniss Everdeen and Lucy Gray Baird from the hit series The Hunger Games are widely thought to be from the Appalachia region.

== See also ==
- Appalachian Americans
- Appalachian English
- Hillbilly
- Li'l Abner
- Ozarks, a similar region in Missouri and Arkansas
- Social and economic stratification in Appalachia
