= The Heartland Series =

American television series

The Heartland Series is a series of television programs about the culture of Appalachia, produced by WBIR-TV of Knoxville, Tennessee, over the 25-year period 1984 through 2009. The series has been produced on a limited basis since 2010.

== Production history ==
The Heartland Series was conceived in 1984 to commemorate the 50th anniversary of the founding of the Great Smoky Mountains National Park with a special series celebrating the people and land of the Southern Appalachian Mountains. Actor Bill Landry was hired to host the series. He had previously been a teacher, had written and begun performing a one-man play based on the life of Albert Einstein called "Einstein the Man," and had portrayed a fictional Tennessee River boat captain named "Captain Nat" as part of the Tennessee Valley Authority (TVA) exhibit at the 1982 World's Fair in Knoxville. Following the fair, he had continued to play the role of Captain Nat on a months-long barge tour of the Tennessee, Cumberland, and Mississippi Rivers that TVA conducted for its 50th anniversary.

The TV series was initially scheduled to run for just three months. According to Landry, the original concept, formed by WBIR creative services director Steve Dean and station general manager Jim Hart, was "to take a camera and interview the last remnants of the old mountain people and go on location.” Each episode was three minutes and 40 seconds long, designed to air in five-minute time slots during and after daily news broadcasts.

The series continued past the short run that was originally planned. Subject matter included geology, wildlife, native plants, invasive species, and other aspects of the region's natural history, Native American lifeways and archeology, re-enactments and remembrances of historical events ranging from events in the American Revolutionary War to coal mining disasters and the early years of TVA, and feature stories about regional culture. As a result of his work on the series, host Bill Landry told an interviewer that he had learned to “tan hides, make jelly butter, saw logs, eat tree bark, carve soapstone, build a log cabin, cut timber, run a sawmill, make moonshine, shoe a horse, call a hoot owl, rut like a deer and know when the buffalo runs.” Traditional music was a perennial topic, including performances by and interviews with traditional musicians active in East Tennessee, demonstrations by craftsmen who make musical instruments, and exploration of musical traditions such as old harp singing and Scottish and Irish influences on the region's music. Two topics that the series generally avoided were politics and controversial religious practices such as snake handling. In addition to the Smokies national park, on-scene production locations in East Tennessee included the Museum of Appalachia, where several episodes were taped, including the titles "1791," "Just Another Day," "The Music Tale," "The Toggins," "Frontier Music, Frontier Foods," and "Gift for Jacob," Rugby, Roan Mountain State Park, the Savage Gulf State Natural Area in Grundy County, and Cumberland Gap National Historical Park.

Landry's skill as an interviewer has been remarked upon by many observers. His folksy, rambling style made him effective at putting people at ease and drawing out the interesting stories of the people that he encountered in the "hills, hollows, small towns and major cities" of Appalachia.

In 1998, the series was expanded to include a 30-minute version airing each Saturday at 7:00 p.m., while it continued to run the original five-minute version during the morning news, after 10 News at Noon, and after 10 News Nightbeat.

In total, about 1,900 short episodes and 150 half-hour programs were produced in the show's 25-year history. Bill Landry was host and narrator for the entire series. He also served as co-producer and wrote and directed many episodes. Steve Dean was executive producer for 20 years, and Doug Mills was cameraman for all but one of the episodes.

The series has been successful with audiences, sometimes achieving audience ratings of 7.0 or higher. In addition to being broadcast on WBIR, the series appeared on WTVC in Chattanooga during the 1980s and was shown on the Travel Channel (under the title Appalachian Stories) for six years.

=== End of production ===
In February 2009, WBIR announced plans to suspend production of the series in September 2009 after taking it "through to some sort of conclusion." WBIR general manager Jeff Lee cited economics as the reason for ending production, noting "it is a luxury for three people to produce 3-1/2 minutes of TV a week." He said that the station would continue to show the hundreds of episodes already produced "for as long as the viewers like them." More than 3,000 people signed an online petition asking for the series to be continued, but WBIR followed through with its plan to end it. The last episode was taped at the Museum of Appalachia in Norris on August 8, 2009 before an audience estimated at 10,000 people, one of the largest crowds in the museum's history. People seeking Landry's autograph waited in line for an hour. The final show featured several Appalachian traditional musicians who had appeared previously in the series, including fiddler Danny Gammon, Bobby Fulcher, Tony Thomas and Jimmy McCarroll.

The last episode was scheduled for broadcast as an hour-long special on September 19, 2009, but to avoid conflict with a Tennessee Volunteers football game the broadcast was postponed and rescheduled to be shown in a prime time slot at 8:00 p.m. on October 17, 2009.

=== Revival ===
Public response to the cancellation of the series caused management to reconsider its demise. In 2010 producer Steve Dean was contracted to produce four more episodes, each an hour long. These shows were well received and led to new hour-long installments, to be produced quarterly, through 2011.

== Recognition and influence ==
During its 25-year history, The Heartland Series received four Emmy Awards, six Iris Awards from the National Association of Television Program Executives, one silver medal and two bronze medals from the New York International Film and Television Festival, and a Theodore Roosevelt Award for Best Outdoor Documentary.

On the day that the last episode was taped, former U.S. Senator Howard Baker, who had appeared in one episode, called the series "the last iteration of our history and culture of a generation." Mark Brown, Carson Newman College's director of news and media relations, described the series as "the nation's longest-running sociological video repository" and said "it did for Southern Appalachia what Studs Terkel did for Chicago."

Thousands of hours of never-broadcast videotapes made during the show's 25-year history are being archived in the historical collection of the McClung Museum in Knoxville. Episodes from the series have been incorporated into Appalachian studies curricula, and The Heartland Series videos depicting Appalachian crafts and craftspeople are displayed in the "Appalachian Heritage" exhibit of the Children's Museum of Oak Ridge. United States embassies around the world keep tapes of The Heartland Series broadcasts as an information resource on life in Appalachia.

== Theme music ==
The theme music for The Heartland Series is an arrangement of the ancient Gaelic ballad "He Mandu," which is played on the hammered dulcimer by folklorist Guy Carawan.
