= Bill Williams (journalist) =

American television journalist (1934–2025)

- Born: William Williams; March 22, 1934; Butler, Missouri, U.S.
- Died: August 18, 2025 (aged 91); East Tennessee, U.S.
- Education: Phillips University, Enid, Oklahoma
- Employer(s): WBIR-TV and Mission of Hope
- Known for: news anchor on WBIR (1977–2000, 2006) and anchor emeritus (2000–2006, 2007–2025)
- Spouse: Wanda Williams

William Williams (March 22, 1934 – August 18, 2025) was an American television journalist, who was Anchor Emeritus for WBIR-TV and special reporter. He worked for WBIR since 1977.

== Early life and career ==
Born in Butler, Missouri, Williams began working for WBIR in Knoxville, Tennessee, in 1977. In 1980, he began a weekly feature, called "Monday's Child", in the news segment, wherein he talked to children needing adoption. Williams helped placed 1,000 children into permanent homes. He retired from WBIR in December 2000. He returned to the anchor desk for much of 2006 when his replacement left the station, and re-retired at the end of 2006, becoming anchor emeritus. He cohosted Friends Across the Mountains Telethon and the Children's Miracle Network telethon on WBIR. Williams also worked with Mission of Hope an outreach program for aid to the people in rural Appalachia. Williams returned to the anchor desk again in February 2013 to anchor a "Retro Newscast" on WBIR with former WBIR anchor Edye Ellis, former WBIR sports director Bob Kesling and now former WBIR anchor Moira Kaye who was a weekend weather forecaster, weekend evening news anchor and morning anchor in the 1980s and early 1990s for WBIR to celebrate 30 years of their slogan Straight from the Heart (of East Tennessee).

== Other work ==
Williams had worked with Mission of Hope since its founding in 1996, Mission of Hope is an outreach program, to help the people and children of rural Appalachia. He has also done a lot of charitable work.

== Personal life and death ==
Williams was a widower. He was married to his wife Wanda for 31 years. On August 18, 2025, Bill Williams passed away in East Tennessee at the age of 91.

The following day on August 19th, WBIR produced segments all day on all of their newscasts paying tribute to Bill Williams. On August 31st, WBIR aired his memorial service live on both their streaming service WBIR+ and on Channel 10.

Meanwhile, WBIR's competitors WATE and WVLT not only acknowledged his passing but also did segments of their own discussing his impact and legacy. In the case of WATE, who has been WBIR's bigger competitor of the two for decades, they ended their weekly Sunday political and sports shows Tennessee This Week and The Sports Source, respectively, on August 24th not by discussing local politics or University of Tennessee Athletics but rather doing full segments paying tribute to Bill Williams and displayed highlights, slide shows, and In Memoriam cards at the end of both broadcasts with no music honoring Bill Williams despite him having little to no direct history with WATE.

== Honors and awards ==
Williams was a past recipient of the "Silver Circle Award" of the National Academy of Television Arts and Sciences. Carson-Newman College (now Carson–Newman University) awarded him an honorary Doctor of Divinity degree. In December 2010 the City of Knoxville changed the name of Hutchinson Avenue, the location of WBIR's studios, to "Bill Williams Avenue" in his honor.
