= WIJV =

- Harriman, Tennessee; United States
- Broadcast area: East Tennessee
- Frequency: 92.7 MHz
- Branding: Victory 92.7

Programming
- Format: Contemporary Christian

Ownership
- Owner: Progressive Media
- Sister stations: WIFA

History
- Former call signs: WBZH

Technical information
- Licensing authority: FCC
- Facility ID: 70637
- Class: A
- ERP: 2,650 watts
- HAAT: 153 meters
- Transmitter coordinates: 35°52′4.00″N 84°25′56.00″W
- Translator: 94.7 W234CU (Knoxville)

Links
- Public license information: Public file; LMS
- Website: Victory927.org

WIJV is a commercial contemporary Christian radio station broadcasting on 92.7 MHz in the Harriman, Tennessee area.

WIJV is owned by Progressive Media and broadcasts Salem Communications contemporary Christian programming. The station was originally known as 92.7 The Breeze and broadcast adult contemporary music.
