= WIFA (AM) =

Knoxville, Tennessee; United States
- Broadcast area: Knoxville metropolitan area
- Frequency: 1240 kHz
- Branding: Faith 1240 AM

Programming
- Format: Contemporary Christian; Christian talk and teaching
- Affiliations: Salem Radio Network

Ownership
- Owner: Progressive Media, Inc.
- Sister stations: WIJV

History
- First air date: January 21, 1941
- Former call signs: WBIR (1941–1980); WHEL (1980–1993); WEZK (1993–1994); WZEZ (1994); WEZK (1994–1995); WIMZ (1995–2000); WTXM (2000–2002); WJXB (2002–2004)

Technical information
- Licensing authority: FCC
- Facility ID: 61041
- Class: C
- Power: 1,000 watts
- Transmitter coordinates: 35°57′17.3″N 83°57′3.7″W

Links
- Public license information: Public file; LMS
- Website: www.faith1240.com

WIFA (1240 AM, "Faith 1240 AM") is a commercial radio station in Knoxville, Tennessee. It airs a mix of Christian Contemporary music and Christian talk and teaching shows. It is owned by Progressive Media, Inc.

WIFA is powered at 1,000 watts, using a non-directional antenna. The transmitter is on Painter Avenue SW near South Concord Street.

== Programming ==
WIFA plays Christian contemporary music part of the day. It also carries preaching programs from national religious leaders, including Adrian Rogers, Joyce Meyer, Tony Evans, Jim Daly and Jay Sekulow.

In afternoon drive time, WIFA carries the syndicated comedy and talk show Rick & Bubba. It also airs the 6pm newscast from Knoxville NBC network affiliate WBIR-TV. WIFA is affiliated with the Salem Radio Network.

== History ==
The station signed on the air on January 21, 1941, and became the affiliate of the Mutual Broadcasting System and the Blue Network. Its original call sign was WBIR. The station's call letters came from Jesse W. "Jay" Birdwell, who founded the station. Birdwell sold WBIR in 1944. In 1949, it added an FM sister station, WBIR-FM at 103.5 MHz. At first, the two stations simulcast most of their schedules. But by the 1970s, WBIR-FM had its own Top 40 format and today is classic rock station WIMZ-FM.

In 1956, WBIR added a television station, WBIR-TV channel 10. WBIR-AM-FM-TV were owned by a consortium headed by J. Lindsay Nunn and his son, Gilmore Nunn. The Nunn family bought WBIR in 1944. In January 1961, WBIR-AM-FM-TV were sold to the News-Piedmont Company of Greenville, South Carolina. Soon afterward, News-Piedmont changed its name to Multimedia, Inc.

The company sold off most of its radio stations including WBIR-AM-FM, while keeping its television stations. WBIR-TV kept its original call letters but the radio stations were required to get new call signs. Through the years, 1240 AM has been called WHEL, WEZK, WZEZ, WIMZ (call letters still found on 103.5 FM), WTXM and WJXB. In 2004, the station took its current call sign, WIFA.
