= Bill Landry =

American dramatist

- Born: William Anthony Landry III; April 10, 1950 (age 76); Chattanooga, Tennessee
- Occupations: Actor; producer; director
- Years active: 1980–present
- Children: Jack Landry
- Parent(s): William Anthony Landry, Jr. (father); Katherine Sullivan Landry (mother)

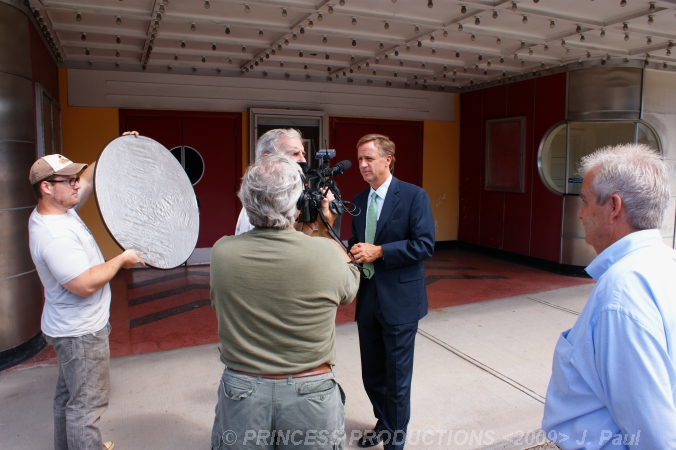
Bill Landry interview

William Anthony Landry III (born April 10, 1950) is an actor, director and producer best known for The Heartland Series, a historical series on East Tennessee broadcast from WBIR-TV in Knoxville, Tennessee.

== Early life ==
Bill Landry was born the son of William Anthony Landry, Jr. and Katherine Sullivan Landry on April 10, 1950. He is one of nine siblings, who were raised in Chattanooga, Tennessee, and attended Notre Dame High School. He attended the University of Tennessee at Chattanooga on a football scholarship, where he studied with Dorothy Hackett Ward, Jim Lewis, and John Tinkler, graduating with a Bachelor of Arts in Literature, English, and Arts. He continued his studies at the Dallas Theater Center, graduating with a Master of Fine Arts degree. After completing his education, he worked as a teacher.

== Career ==
In the early 1980s, Landry wrote and performed a one-man play titled Einstein the Man and worked during the 1982 Knoxville Worlds Fair as a riverboat captain in the Tennessee Valley Authority (TVA) exhibit. After the fair ended, he continued to play the role of "Captain Nat" on a TVA tour of the Cumberland, Tennessee and Mississippi Rivers as part of TVA's 50-year anniversary celebrations. After working in a commercial filmed at Pellissippi State Community College, Landry was referred to WBIR-TV and hired in 1984 to work on The Heartland Series, a historical program on East Tennessee.

Landry wrote and directed many of the episodes, as well as producing and appearing as a character. The series issued over 1400 short features and about 150 half-hour length programs, and won awards including four Emmy Awards, six Iris Awards from the National Association of Television Program Executives, two bronze medals and a silver from the New York International Film and Television Festival, and a Theodore Roosevelt Award for "Best Outdoor Documentary."

Landry received Emmy Awards for directing in 1999 and 2000, and in 1999 received an honorary Doctorate of Humanities degree from Lincoln Memorial University in recognition of his contributions to the humanities.

In 2000 the play Einstein the Man was published through a grant and made available to middle and high school students in the state of Tennessee. In 2003, Landry's production of The George Washington Carver Project was also distributed by the Tennessee Department of Education to schools in Tennessee through the Carver Project website. In 2011 Landry published a book on East Tennessee history titled Appalachian Tales & Heartland Adventures.

== Personal life ==
Landry currently lives in Blount County, Tennessee. Landry is the father of one son (Jack Landry) from his first marriage to Jessica Lynn Jones Landry. His wife Rebecca Carlock Webb "Becky" Landry died on April 19, 2012, at age 58.
