= Social and economic stratification in Appalachia =

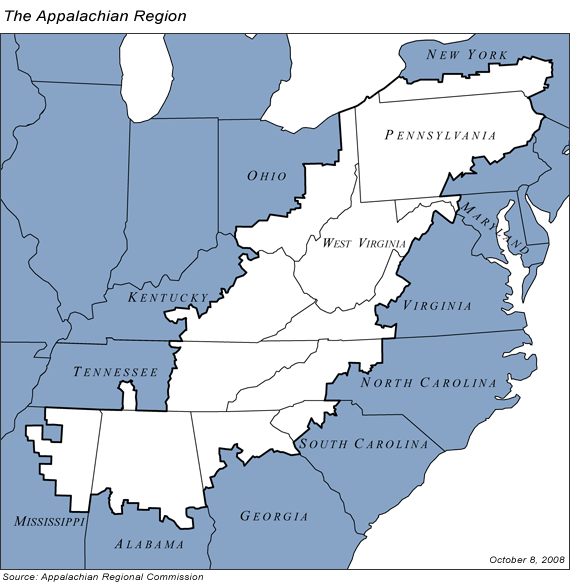
Areas included within the Appalachian Regional Commission's charter.

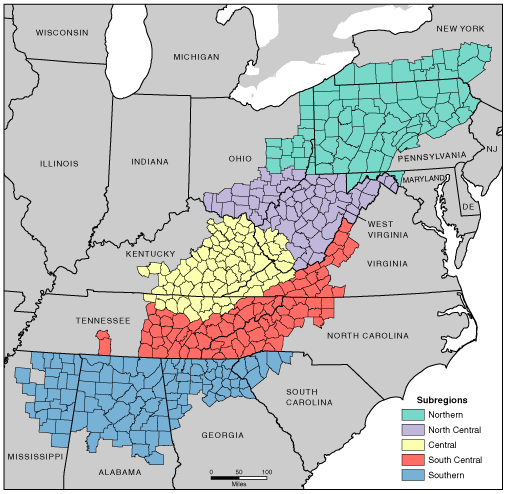
Subregions of Appalachia, published by the Appalachian Regional Commission in 2009.

Appalachia is a geographic region of the Eastern United States. Home to over 25 million people, the region includes mountainous areas of 13 states: Mississippi, Alabama, Pennsylvania, New York, Georgia, South Carolina, North Carolina, Tennessee, Virginia, Kentucky, Ohio, Maryland, as well as the entirety of West Virginia.

Appalachia is often divided into three subregions: Southern Appalachia (portions of Georgia, Alabama, Mississippi, North and South Carolina, and Tennessee), Central Appalachia (portions of Kentucky, Southern West Virginia, Southern and Southeastern Ohio, Virginia, and Tennessee), and Northern Appalachia (parts of New York, Pennsylvania, Northern West Virginia, Maryland, and Northeastern Ohio). Further divisions can also be made, distinguishing Northern from North Central and Southern from South Central Appalachia. Though all areas of Appalachia face the challenges of rural poverty, some elements (particularly those relating to industry and natural resource extraction) are unique to each subregion. Central Appalachians, for example, experience the most severe poverty, which is partially due to the area's isolation from urban growth centers. The Appalachian region holds 423 counties and covers 206,000 square miles.

The area's rugged terrain and isolation from urban centers has also resulted in a distinct regional culture. Many natives of the region have a distinct pride for their Appalachian heritage regardless of financial status. Outsiders often hold incorrect and overgeneralized beliefs about the area and its inhabitants. These misperceptions, and their relationship to the culture and folklore of this near-isolated area, greatly impact the region's development.

Commerce within the region expanded widely in the 19th century with the advent of modern industries like agriculture, coal-mining, and logging. Many Appalachians sold their rights to land and minerals to large corporations, to the extent that ninety-nine percent of the residents control less than half of the land. Thus, though the area has a wealth of natural resources, its inhabitants are often poor. In addition, decreased levels of education and a lack of public infrastructure (such as highways, developed cities, businesses, and medical services) has perpetuated the region's poor economic standing.

== Economics ==
Coal mining corporations in 1880 to 1910 paid farm owners millions of dollars for mineral rights, but did not open mines until railroads were available. Coal mining corporations after 1910 began operations in remote areas by building railroads that provided freight service and lost-cost travel opportunities for residents. The operators built new towns, for their workers, with modern homes that were much better in terms of size, heat and sanitation than the squalid shacks without outhouses that served before the coal boom. They built and funded public schools and enforced state laws against child labor. They subsidized medical care and churches. Coal companies often paid workers in scrip, a private form of currency or wage credit that could be spent at company stores, keeping much of their earnings tied to the company and the company town. The goals were to discourage unionization and hostile civic action, and to keep the best workers.

Towns closer to well-developed urban areas that fringe Appalachia (Pittsburgh, Wheeling, Columbus, Cincinnati, Atlanta, Washington, D.C., etc.) are disproportionately better-off than rural regions in the mountainous interior, and lack of accessible transportation has greatly restricted the Appalachian economy. However, the issue has not generally been made a priority by regional political leaders, many of whom eschewed developments that would have been difficult and expensive to establish in the mountainous areas.

=== Power, politics, and poverty ===
Lower-class poorly educated community members developed a habit of compliance rather than support democratic institutions for social change. Middle class residents allied themselves with the elites rather than challenging the system that supported their everyday lives. Ambitious educated young people left Appalachia, widening the gap between the poor and those in power. Observers often report a fatalistic attitude on the part of the Appalachian poor people, because of their weak civic cultures and a sense of powerlessness.

Some residents live on land that cannot be traded outside of trusted circles or used as collateral because of inadequate records of ownership rights. This "dead" capital is a factor that contributes to the historical poverty of the region, limiting Appalachians' abilities to sell their investments in home and other land-related capital. The drastic socioeconomic divide has exacerbated violent feuds among Appalachians living in remote mountainous regions.

Recently, with the decline of the coal-mining industry, even fewer jobs have become available in the region. In 2024, Appalachian coal mining employed 27,829 workers, down from a recent peak of 60,224 in 2011.

=== Creation of the Appalachian Regional Commission (ARC) ===
As of the 1960s, Appalachia had the highest poverty rate and percentage of working poor in the nation. According to research, roughly one third of the region's population was living in poverty.

Having witnessed the region's hardship during his 1960 campaign for the Democratic presidential nomination, President John F. Kennedy talked about improving the living standard for Appalachians. In 1963, Kennedy formally convened the President's Appalachian Regional Commission (PARC), which developed a comprehensive program for the region's economic development. In 1965, President Lyndon B. Johnson signed the Appalachian Regional Development Act, formally establishing the permanent Appalachian Regional Commission. Robert F. Kennedy made Appalachia a high personal priority in his campaign against Johnson for the Democratic nomination in 1968.

The ARC was established to address regional economic disparities and promote economic development in Appalachia. Looking to identify the roots of the region's problems, the ARDA stated: "Congress finds and declares that the Appalachian region of the United States, while abundant in natural resources and rich in potential, lags behind the rest of the Nation in its economic growth and that its people have not shared properly in the Nation's prosperity."

Though the ARC has made improvements, the Appalachian region continues to face socioeconomic hardships. As of 1999, roughly twenty-five percent of Appalachian counties still qualified as "distressed," the commission's lowest socioeconomic ranking.

=== Economic impact of prisons ===
The late 20th century saw a large spike in prison development in Appalachia. between 1990 and 1999, 245 prisions were built in rural and small-town communities across the United States; Appalachian coalfield communities were among the places affected by this rural prison-building boom. Many of these prison were established in rural counties and areas. Though the prisons created jobs, the counties with prisons were found to have lower incomes and more poverty compared to counties without prisons.

== Educational disadvantages ==
In 2000, 80.49 percent of all adults in the United States were high school graduates, as opposed to 76.89 in Appalachia. An early 1980s Appalachian Regional Commission estimate put adult functional illiteracy in Appalachia around 30 percent. Education differences between men and women are greater in Appalachia than the rest of the nation, tying into a greater trend of gender inequalities.

Education in Appalachia has historically lagged behind average literacy levels of United States. At first, education in this region was largely nurtured through religious institutions. Children who found time away from family work were often taught to read about the Bible and Christian morality. Then, after the Civil War, some districts established primary schools and high schools. People began to access standard education during this period, and higher education in large communities was expanded at that time. Lately, in the late 19th century and early 20th century, education in rural areas has been advanced; some settlement schools and sponsored schools were established by organizations. In the 20th century, the national policy has begun affecting education in Appalachia. Those schools were trying to meet the demands which federal and state settled. Some public schools were facing the problem of gathering funds because of government's No Child Left Behind policy.

Historically, logging, coal mining and farming were important sources of employment in Appalachia. None of these jobs need a high education, and employers don't decide the jobs based on their education level. A diploma has not been a priority in job finding. Many children of school age dropped school to help their family work. Women in Appalachia have less opportunity in access of jobs. Many kinds of jobs in this area require a strong body, so that men are preferred than women by employers when they are seeking jobs.

The New Opportunity School for Women (NOSW) was founded by Jane Stephenson in 1987 to provide educational and career-development opportunities for women in Appalachia, which has been deprived of what other parts of the nation take for granted. The region is primarily utilized for mining, coal, and its other natural resources and farmland. Families that live in these parts have become accustomed to a certain way of life whether it involve school or working. Many kids are not given the opportunity to be successful, only to remain in the family business surrounding one of the many natural resources from their land. NOSW's first residential program in 1987 lasted three weeks and enrolled 14 women; in 2018, it's Berea residential program was shortened to two weeks. The NOSW also offers a residential housing opportunity to those with low-income after their participation in the course and thereafter.

Women from the Appalachian region of Kentucky and surrounding south central Appalachian states share common challenges resulting from low educational attainment, limited employment skills, few strong role models and low self-esteem. The presence of these challenges are directly linked to high incidences of early marriage, teen pregnancies, divorce, domestic violence, substance abuse and high school dropout rates.

— National Career Development Association

This program provides interview, job search, computer and other basic skills that are useful in careers for those less skilled. Women can participate freely; no extra money is required. Participants are provided with classes from Monday to Friday, 8 am to 12 pm and afternoon is internship time. These classes are mainly about: job search, interview skill, math, women's health, computer skills, leadership development, and self-protection. (National Career Development Association) Internships not only include working in a real work site, but also include a training of choosing interview clothes and make-ups. The organizer will also hold some events during the weekends except for additional classes. For instance, the American Association of University Women and the Berea Younger Women's Club are available for participants to choose. They can also go for a field trip to some places. All these efforts are conducted to help women build confidence in job finding. As a vulnerable group of people, these rich experiences can help them become an active part in their living communities. After graduating from NOSW, professional agencies will provides each of them counseling services about education. This program has achieved active outcomes. A 2013 NCDA profile reported that upon entering the program, 80 percent of participants had family incomes below $10,000; half had a GED, while the other half had a high school diploma but no college degree. A graduate survey found that 79 percent were employed, in school, or both; 55 percent had earned an associate, bachelor's, or master's degree, and 35 percent had earned a certificate.

== Environmental hardship ==
The Appalachian coal region of the Eastern United States is a leading producer of coal in the country, having produced about 27% of U.S. coal in 2022. Research shows that residents who live in close proximity to mountaintop removal (MTR) mines have higher mortality rates than average, and are more likely to live in poverty and be exposed to harmful environmental conditions than people in otherwise comparable parts of the region.

== Gender inequalities ==
Women have traditionally been limited to the domestic sphere, often lack access to resources and employment opportunities, are disproportionately represented in peripheral labor markets, and have lower wages and higher vulnerability to job loss. Throughout the region, women typically earn 64 percent of men's wages. However, when adjusted for the fact that women take less risky jobs, that require fewer qualifications, they make roughly the same amount. Women are also often the hardest-hit by poverty—for example, In distressed Appalachian counties, about 64 to 70 percent of female-headed households with children under age six lived in poverty, a figure substantially higher than the national average.

Still, women play a large role in the social movements and cultural life of Appalachia.

Women have played a major role in the labor and activist movements in the coal-bearing regions of Appalachia. [...] Other crucial roles for women have involved education, literature, healthcare and art, and the promotion of minorities in our region.

Women have played prominent roles in community and enviornmental activism. Those women devoted their lifelong efforts in improving their social status and in fighting against poverty in their communities and their living regions. A woman named Kathy Selvage was a citizen lobbyist for years and worked in the fight against a proposal for a Wise County coal-fired plant. She says that Appalachian women are people of action. Lorelei Scarbro helped establish a community center in Whitesville, W.V. to encourage outside activity besides the home and workplace. This reunites them with togetherness and a place to convene about ideas and local build-up. Vivian Stockman has campaigned against mountaintop-removal mining and used photography to document its enviornmental effects.

A coal miner's daughter from Wise County, Va., Selvage has always had a great respect for miners, but when a coal company began blasting off mountaintops in her community, Selvage began working to bring national exposure to mountaintop removal coal mining.

Projects have been created in rural Appalachia to help women save money, especially for retirement. Programs like this aim to help women who have difficulty in raising children and saving money for retirement. Some women have saved little for their retirement and risk running out of money. Appalachian Savings Project was established to alleviate this risk by creating saving plans for self-employed women workers who do not have those plans provided by companies. This program aims to help the women workers who have children to care for.

Due to the lagged economic status in Appalachian regions and discrimination, there are an increasing number of women who are getting jobs without comprehensive benefits, such as retirement plans. Instead of consumption, it is an investment to have this saving account. Many mothers put their children first and will not save money for their retirement until their children are independent and do not need help any more. However, this program is encouraging them to save money for their own need instead of their kids'. There are also some complaints about the project. The two most common complaints are that the women do not have enough time to attend the financial classes and that there is not enough money for them to spare.

== Outside perspectives and stereotypes ==
Though mainstream Americans assume that Appalachian culture is homogeneous in the region, many distinct locales and sub-regions exist. Overgeneralizations of Appalachianites as impulsive, personalistic, and individualistic "hillbillies" abound. Many scholars speculate that these stereotypes have been created by powerful economic and political forces to justify the exploitation of Appalachian peoples through industrialization and the extraction of natural resources. For example, the same forces that put up barriers to prevent the development of civic culture promulgate the image of Appalachian peoples as politically apathetic, without a social consciousness, and deserving of their disenfranchised state. In spite of the region's desperate need for aid, weariness of being represented as "helpless, dumb and poor" often creates an attitude of hostility among Appalachianites.

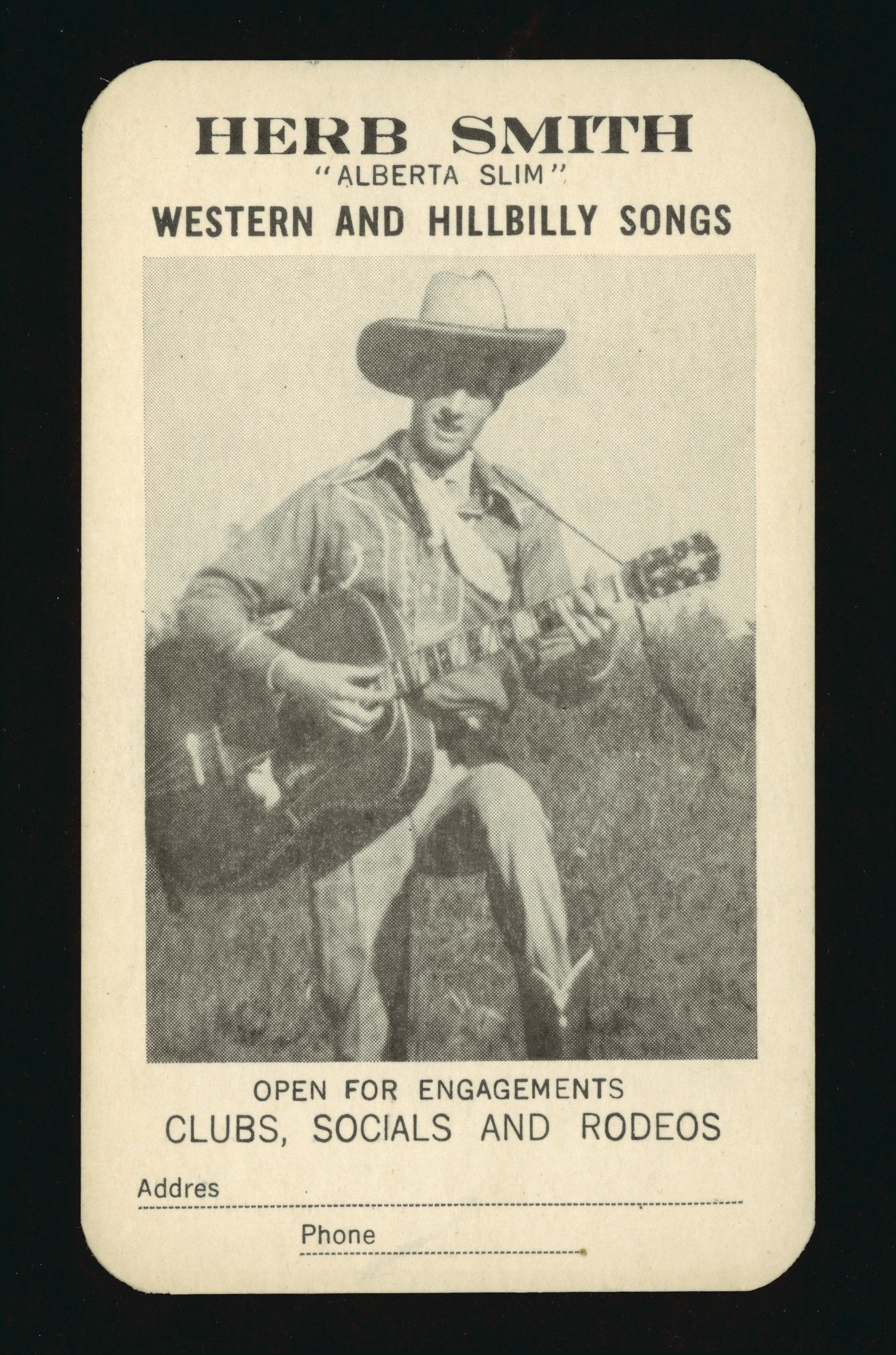
Alberta Slim, a country singer that sang Appalachian music. The stereotypical work 'Hillbilly' being used in his music genre.

=== Origin of the stereotype ===
These stereotypes have been present for as long as people can remember, as people are unsure of exactly where titles like "hillbillies" came about. It has been said that it came all the way from colonial times when Scotch-Irish immigrants came over to America, and others have said it was given to supporters of King William III during the Williamite war, but was not used much in America until much later. It is known that up until the 1880s, Appalachia was seen just like any other rural area. People then began to view the Appalachian cultures as 'behind' during the industrial revolution, when the way of life was different in Appalachia as they did not adjust as quickly. The "hillbilly" stereotype was established well before the Great Depression; the term was defined in print by 1900, and hundreds of films depicting southern mountain people appeared between 1904 and 1920. Appalachian music grew out of several different musical traditions. Ballads and hymns from the British Isles were part of its early repertoire, alongside African American banjo and string-band traditions. Instruments of German origin, including the dulcimer, also found their way into the music, which later took on influences from popular music as well. After the stereotype was created the media took this and exploited the image of poor people without electricity that were lazy and it became known to be like that.

=== Appalachians as a separate status group ===
It has been suggested that Appalachia constitutes a separate status group under the sociologist Max Weber's definition. The criteria are tradition, endogamy, an emphasis on intimate interaction and isolation from outsiders, monopolization of economic opportunities, and ownership of certain commodities rather than others. Appalachia fulfills at least the first four, if not all five. Furthermore, mainstream Americans tend to see Appalachia as a separate subculture of low status. Based on these facts, it is reasonable to say that Appalachia constitutes a separate status group.

=== Depictions of Appalachians in media ===
Appalachia existed as a relatively unnoticed region until the eighteenth-century when color writers (many of whom wrote for magazines) began to take interest. The original description of Appalachia as a distinct region primarily comes from the insistence of Appalachia's "otherness" by those color writers. The earliest expressions of the Appalachian caricature created by the color writers directly inspired the hillbilly persona known today. The hillbilly stereotype achieved prominence alongside industrial capitalists' interests in profiting off of the mountain range and its people.

Massey's research finds that the hillbilly is malleable, often used in media as a tool to project the countries' anxieties upon and stitch together an amalgamation of what society rejects. One wave of anxiety that led to a rise in the media's depiction of the "hillbilly," occurred in the mid-twentieth century following the civil unrest of the 1950s and 60s when many white Americans felt their autonomy was under threat. Television shows such as The Beverly Hillbillies (which did not depict an Appalachian family but did perpetuate poor-white stereotypes), which ran from 1962 to 1971, emerged along with The Andy Griffith Show and Hee Haw. All of these series featured ridicule and humor based around negative characteristics of rural, mountain peoples.

Another wave of anxiety occurred in the late-twentieth-century into the twenty-first. Today, reality television has assumed the role previously filled by sitcoms like The Beverly Hillbillies. Series such as Call of the Wildman and Moonshiners fulfill the demand to observe the "other," and, perhaps unconsciously, perpetuate the stereotype of the toothless, barefoot, moonshiner hillbilly.

==== Television ====
Appalachian stereotyping was shown in early television when The Beverly Hillbillies was released. The people in this show were portrayed to be the classic Appalachian resident, which painted the culture in a bad way from the beginning. The representation continued on after this and continued to portray those in Appalachia as hillbillies. From then on it was comedic to see an Appalachian family or Appalachian culture; as the representation that was shown was merely to make fun of the culture. This stereotype expands on more than just the physical characteristics of these people, but also their views. It is assumed that they are conservative, uneducated, and even racist. Carter Country is a show that demonstrated race and the uneducated views of some in Appalachia. It gives a view on a newly integrated area and how people in the Appalachian area adjust to it.

==== Movies ====
Appalachia has been portrayed in many movies throughout the years, examples include October Sky, We Are Marshall, Dark Waters, The Devil All The Time, Logan Lucky, Hillbilly Elegy, Silent Hill, and Wrong Turn. Movies also highlight Appalachia in a negative way. This began as early as 1904 in a silent film titled The Moonshiner. In this movie, all that was featured was people making moonshine and trying to get away with it, which is a constant theme. Other genres also bring in an Appalachian theme like Deliverance. This movie is a thriller about people that camp in an Appalachian area, and it paints locals in a negative way. Depictions of Appalachia vary in their accuracy and tone.

== See also ==
- American ethnicity
- Appalachian music
- History of poverty in the United States
- Hobet Coal Mine
- Mountain white
- Overmountain Men
- Poor White
- Social stratification
