= Mountain white =

White settlers of the rural Appalachian Mountains in the United States

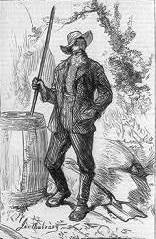
- Kentucky moonshiner depicted in Harper's Weekly

Regions with significant populations
- Appalachia

Religion
- Protestantism

Related ethnic groups
- White Southerners, Poor White, Scotch-Irish Americans

Mountain whites were white Americans (usually poor) living in Appalachia and the inland region of the Antebellum South. They were generally small farmers, who inhabited the valleys of the Appalachian range from western Virginia spanning down to northern Georgia and northern Alabama.

== History ==
They were often isolated from the rest of Southern society and civilization during the Antebellum South (1783–1861). Because of this, few owned slaves and many were more likely to be critical of slavery. As independent small farmers living on the harsh American frontier, their interests were starkly different from those of white Southerners that lived on commercial plantations or in large cities. They were also able to retain many of their customs, which they brought over from their European roots, that had long since died out.

Mountain whites generally despised the aristocratic structure found in much of the Deep South, where rich slave-owning planters controlled legislatures and stood as cultural heroes and figures for most southerners. During the Civil War, some communities of mountain whites were deeply split by those who identified with the Union and those who identified with the Confederacy. Pro-Union attitudes were likelier to prevail in the Upland South where mountain whites lived, where in the case of western Virginia, this sentiment was seen as one of the leading causes of West Virginia's secession from the rest of the state. Voters in the mountain areas of Eastern Tennessee elected Republican Party members of Congress for since 1859, with the exception of four years.

Mountain whites also developed their own styles of music which borrowed from Scottish and Irish tradition as many were of Scots-Irish descent. The music of mountain whites contributed heavily to the formation of what would become bluegrass music.

== Identity ==
People classified as "Mountain whites" during the time of the Antebellum South were noted for their impoverished conditions. They were also noted for putting cultural importance on folk magic, old European folk songs, and their unique dialect.

== See also ==
- American ethnicity
- Culture of the Southern United States
- Great Wagon Road
- Hillbilly
- Melungeon
- Poor White
- Redneck
- Social and economic stratification in Appalachia
- Tuckahoes and Cohees
