= WBIR-TV =

Television station in Knoxville, Tennessee

- Knoxville, Tennessee; United States
- Channels: Digital: 10 (VHF); Virtual: 10
- Branding: WBIR 10

Programming
- Affiliations: 10.1: NBC; for others, see § Subchannels

Ownership
- Owner: Tegna Inc., a subsidiary of Nexstar Media Group; (WBIR-TV, LLC)
- Sister stations: Nexstar: WATE-TV

History
- First air date: August 12, 1956
- Former channel numbers: Analog: 10 (VHF, 1956–2009); Digital: 31 (UHF, 2001–2009)
- Former affiliations: CBS (1956–1988)
- Call sign meaning: Jesse W. Birdwell (founder of WBIR radio)

Technical information
- Licensing authority: FCC
- Facility ID: 46984
- ERP: 40.9 kW
- HAAT: 546 m (1,791 ft)
- Transmitter coordinates: 36°0′19″N 83°56′23″W

Links
- Public license information: Public file; LMS
- Website: www.wbir.com

WBIR-TV (channel 10) is a television station in Knoxville, Tennessee, United States, affiliated with NBC. It is owned by the Tegna subsidiary of Nexstar Media Group; Nexstar owns ABC affiliate WATE-TV (channel 6). WBIR-TV's studios are located on Bill Williams Avenue in Knoxville's Belle Morris section, and its transmitter is located on Sharp's Ridge in North Knoxville.

== History ==
WBIR-TV signed on the air on August 12, 1956, as a CBS affiliate, taking that affiliation away from WTVK (channel 26, later WVLT-TV on channel 8). During the late 1950s, the station was also briefly affiliated with the NTA Film Network. WBIR-TV was originally owned by a consortium headed by J. Lindsay Nunn and his son, Gilmore Nunn, owners of WBIR radio (1240 AM, later WIFA; and FM 103.5 WIMZ-FM). The station's call letters come from Jesse W. "Jay" Birdwell, who founded WBIR radio in 1941; Birdwell sold the AM radio station to the Nunns in 1944. The Nunns shared ownership with WBIR general manager John P. Hart; Knoxville residents Robert and Martha Ashe, and the Taft family of Cincinnati. The Nunn group beat out the much larger Scripps-Howard, owner of the Knoxville News-Sentinel and WNOX radio for the license to broadcast on channel 10. By this time, the Federal Communications Commission was increasingly wary about common ownership of newspapers and broadcast outlets and preferred separation. Additionally, the Nunn group was majority-owned by local residents.

In October 1959 the Tafts' broadcast subsidiary, Radio Cincinnati, Inc. (later known as Taft Broadcasting), purchased the remaining 70 percent of the WBIR stations outright from the other parties.

In January 1961, Radio Cincinnati, Inc. sold WBIR-AM-FM-TV to the News-Piedmont Company of Greenville, South Carolina, owner of WFBC-AM-FM-TV in its home city. In 1967, News-Piedmont merged with Southern Broadcasting to form the Southeastern Broadcasting Corporation. Soon afterward, Southeastern sold off most of its radio stations (including WBIR-AM-FM), purchased four more television stations and changed its name to Multimedia, Inc. WBIR shared flagship status with WFBC-TV (since WYFF).

On September 10, 1988, WBIR became an NBC affiliate, swapping affiliations with WTVK; this marked CBS' return to its original affiliate in Knoxville. At the time, NBC was the top-rated network while CBS was in third place near the midpoint of the Laurence Tisch period of that network's history. NBC was more than willing to make the switch, since WTVK had been one of its weakest affiliates while WBIR was a solid runner-up to WATE-TV; WTVK would move to VHF channel 8 not too long afterwards on December 8 and become WKXT-TV. With the switch, channel 10 became the last major commercial station in Knoxville to change affiliations. The switch also made channel 10 the third station in Knoxville to carry NBC; the network had previously aired on WATE from 1953 to 1979 before moving to WTVK in 1979. Multimedia merged with Gannett in 1995.

For a time in the 1980s, WBIR was seen on several ten-watt translators across East Tennessee and Virginia. One of them, W04BM, was licensed to LaFollette, Tennessee, and operated on channel 4.

In 2008, WBIR-TV debuted new graphics and news music. On June 1, 2011, WBIR-TV and Fox affiliate WTNZ-TV, for whom WBIR-TV was producing a 10 p.m. newscast, debuted a new high-definition news set and weather studio and a full makeover of branding. However, WBIR-TV retained their logo by adding the HD symbol to the right of the logo.

On June 29, 2015, the Gannett Company separated, with one side specializing in print media and the other side specializing in broadcast and digital media. WBIR was retained by the latter company, named Tegna.

Nexstar Media Group—owner of WATE-TV in Knoxville—acquired Tegna in a deal announced in August 2025 and completed on March 19, 2026.

== Programming ==
=== Local programming ===
==== The Heartland Series ====
The Heartland Series, hosted by Bill Landry, was a popular documentary series produced by WBIR from 1984 until 2009. It was conceived in 1984 to commemorate the 50th anniversary of the founding of the Great Smoky Mountains National Park. It continued to celebrate the people and the land of the entire Appalachian region, presenting re-enactments of historic events and feature stories about regional culture. In February 2009, WBIR announced that it would suspend production of the series in September 2009, but would continue to show the hundreds of episodes already produced "for as long as the viewers like them." The last episode was taped at the Museum of Appalachia in Norris on August 8, 2009, before an audience estimated at 10,000 people, one of the largest crowds in the museum's history.

During its 25-year history, The Heartland Series received several awards, including four Emmy Awards. U.S. embassies around the world keep tapes of The Heartland Series broadcasts as an information resource on life in Appalachia.

==== Our Stories ====
In 2006, WBIR celebrated its 50th anniversary with a special report on some of the past stories captured on the station for the past 50 years. These reports were called "Our Stories" and included retrospectives on events such as U.S. Presidents visiting Knoxville and East Tennessee, major crimes and even the 25th Anniversary of the 1982 World's Fair.

==== Friends Across the Mountains Telethon ====
WBIR co-produces a yearly telethon with Sinclair Broadcast Group–owned ABC affiliate WLOS in Asheville, North Carolina, benefiting Friends of the Smokies and Great Smoky Mountains National Park. The proceeds from the telethon help support critical programs and projects in the park. It is co-hosted by WBIR Anchor Emeritus Bill Williams and WLOS anchor Larry Blunt.

=== News operation ===
Prior to September 15, 2008, WBIR-TV aired Live at Five at 5 p.m. on weekdays. The program focused on community events and celebrity interviews. In 2008, the show was moved to 4 p.m. and was temporarily renamed Live at Five at Four with WBIR asking for viewers' opinions on a new name. The quirky temporary name, however, was embraced by viewers and Live at Five at Four remained the brand for the 4 p.m. program for the next decade and a half. In 2010, Live at Five at Four debuted new graphics to better reflect programming shown on the newscast. The final version of graphics on Live at Five at Four debut the week of December 4, 2017, as part of WBIR's revamp and update. On July 3, 2023, after 15 years of Live at Five at Four and nearly three decades of the Live at Five umbrella-moniker, the 4 p.m. broadcast became 10 About Town. The format of highlighting local community events and personalities remained the same during the title transitioning of Live at Five at Four to 10 About Town. The Dr. Bob Show, a popular East Tennessee PBS health program, began as a segment of Live at Five before expanding to a half-hour format.

Until late March 2011, WBIR-TV produced a 10 p.m. newscast for CW affiliate WBXX-TV. On March 28, WBIR-TV began producing a nightly 10 p.m. newscast for Fox affiliate WTNZ (channel 43). WBIR also begin producing a weekday morning news show at 7 a.m. that begin in June 2012 for that station. Both stations' newscasts began airing in high definition on June 1, 2011, making WBIR and WTNZ the second and third stations in Knoxville to make the upgrade.

On October 28, 2013, WBIR expanded its noon newscast from 25 minutes to a full hour.

WBIR also has a 24-hour news channel called "10 News 2", that simulcasts and rebroadcasts their newscasts. As of 2023, this channel is still available but only on Comcast Xfinity cable channel 21 in Knoxville.

== Technical information ==
=== Subchannels ===
The station's digital signal is multiplexed:

Subchannels of WBIR-TV
Subchannel	Res.	Short name	Programming
10.1	1080i	WBIR-HD	NBC
10.2	480i	MeTV	MeTV
10.3	480i	Crime	True Crime Network
10.4	480i	Quest	Quest
10.5	480i	TheNest	The Nest
10.6	480i	ShopLC	Shop LC
10.7	480i	OUTLAW	Outlaw
10.8	480i	Comet	Comet

The national NBC Weather Plus network is defunct as of December 1, 2008, and was revamped as an affiliate of NBC Plus, utilizing the same graphics as Weather Plus (and is now a computer-updated loop of regional satellite/radar images, current temperatures, and daily forecasts) and without the national on-camera meteorologist segments (though the local OCM segments remained). In late 2011, it was replaced with The Local AccuWeather Channel, branded as "10 Weather Now". On October 8, 2012, it was replaced with MeTV. In early 2015, WBIR added a third digital channel (channel 10.3), which currently broadcasts the Justice Network.

=== Analog-to-digital conversion ===
WBIR-TV shut down its analog signal, over VHF channel 10, on June 12, 2009, the official date on which full-power television stations in the United States transitioned from analog to digital broadcasts under federal mandate. The station's digital signal relocated from its pre-transition UHF channel 31 to VHF channel 10.
