= Poor White =

United States social caste and ethnic group

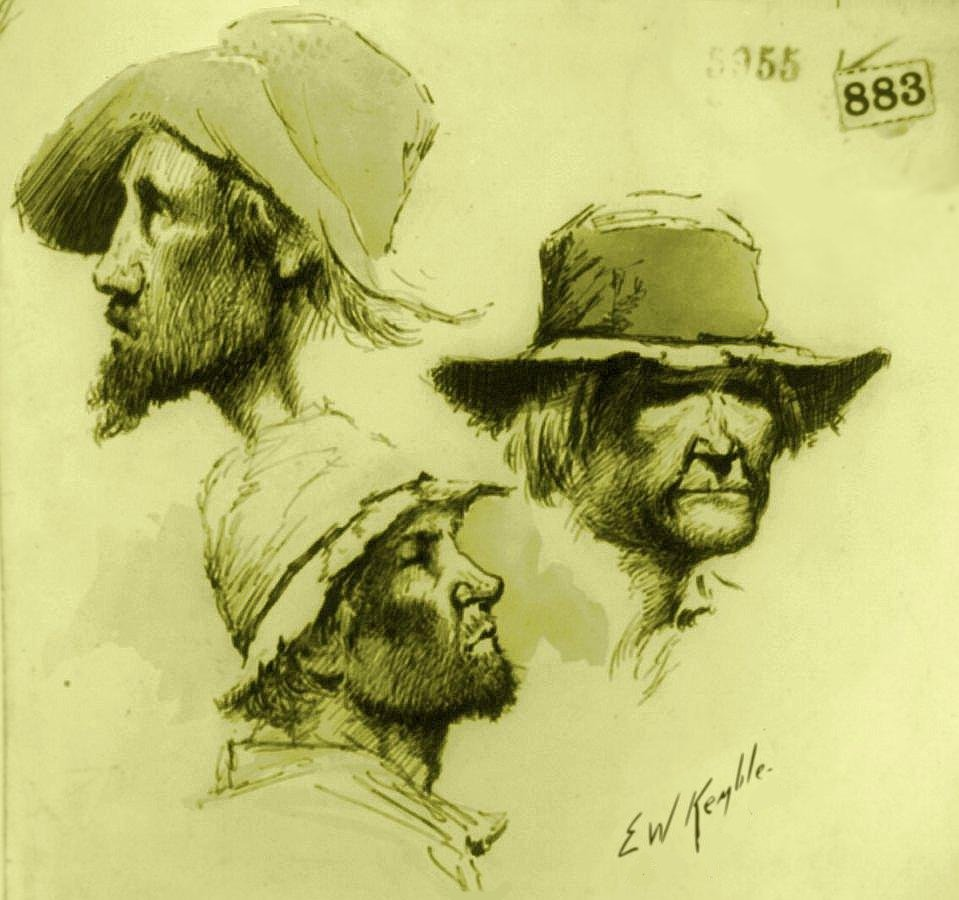
- Portrayals of Poor Whites in U.S. state of Georgia, as illustrated by E. W. Kemble, c. 1891

Regions with significant populations
- Southern United States

Related ethnic groups
- White Southerners, Mountain white, White Americans

Poor White is a sociocultural classification used to describe economically disadvantaged Whites in the English-speaking world, especially White Americans with low incomes.

In the United States, Poor White is the historical classification for an American sociocultural group, of generally Western and/or Northern European descent, with many being in the Southern United States and Appalachia regions. They were first classified as a social caste in the Antebellum South, consisting of white, agrarian, economically disadvantaged laborers or squatters, who usually owned neither land nor slaves.

In the British Commonwealth, the term was historically used to describe lower-class whites, notably in the context of the "poor white problem" in South Africa.

== United States ==
=== Definition ===
Author Wayne Flynt in his book, Dixie's Forgotten People: The South's Poor Whites (2004), argues that "one difficulty in defining poor whites stems from the diverse ways in which the phrase has been used. It has been applied to economic and social classes as well as to cultural and ethical values." While other regions of the United States have white people who are poor, this does not have the same meaning as the Poor White in the South. In context, the Poor White refers to a distinct sociocultural group, with members who belong to families with a history of multi-generational poverty and cultural divergence.

=== Connotation ===
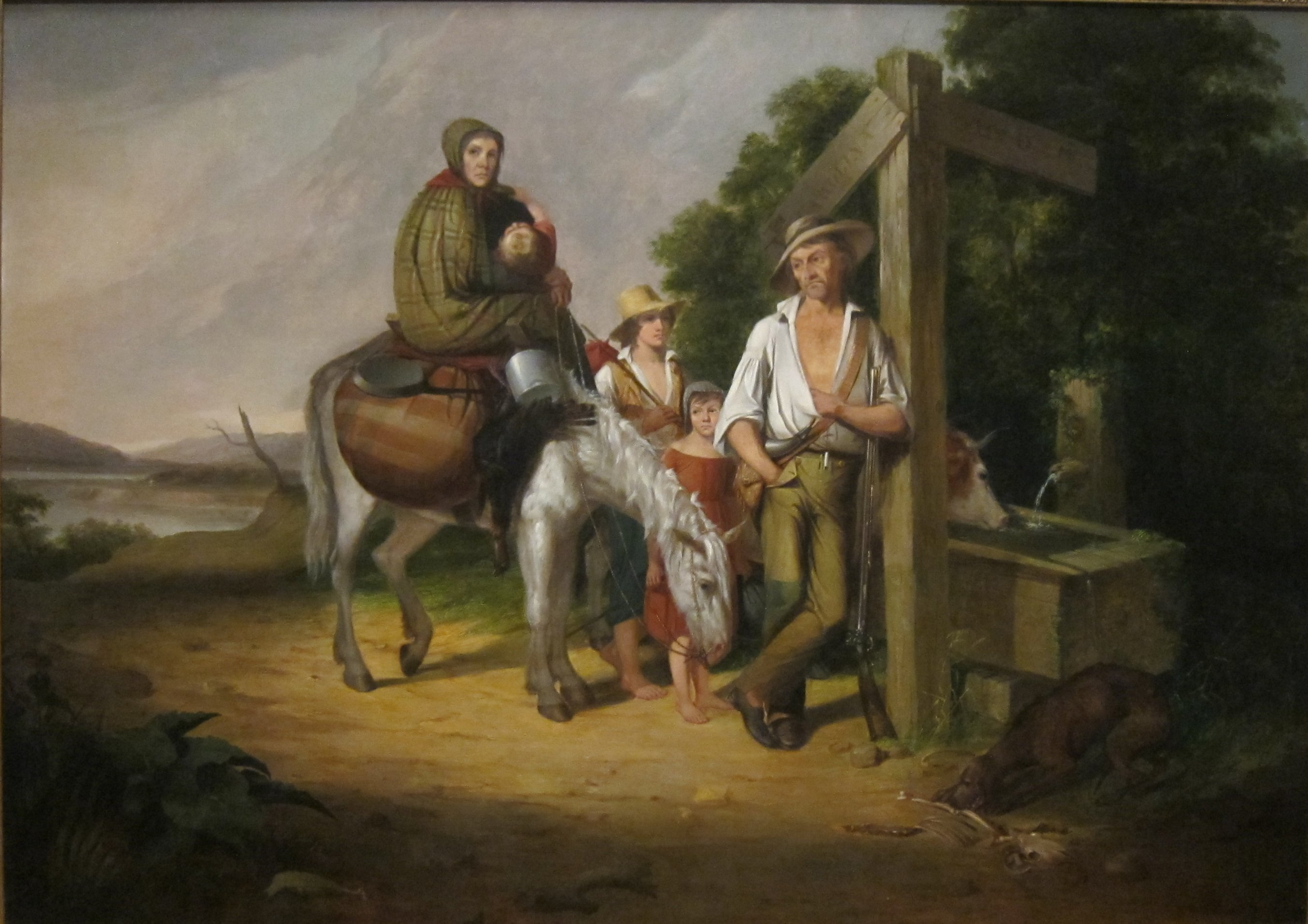
North Carolina Emigrants: Poor White Folks, by James Henry Beard, 1845, Cincinnati Art Museum

Throughout American history the Poor Whites have regularly been referred to by various terms; the majority of which are often considered disparaging. They have been known as "rednecks" (especially in modern context), "hillbillies" in Appalachia, "crackers" in Texas, Georgia, and Florida, "Hoosier" in St. Louis, Missouri, and "white trash". The use of the term "Poor White" by the white Southern planter class, was to distance themselves from elements of society they viewed as "undesirable", "lesser" or "antisocial."

=== History ===
Much of the character and condition of Poor Whites is rooted in the institution of slavery. Rather than provide wealth as it had for the Southern planter class, in stark contrast, slavery considerably hindered the progress of non-slaveholding whites by exerting a crowding-out effect, eliminating free labor in the region. This effect, compounded by the area's widespread lack of public education and its general practice of endogamy, prevented low-income and low-wealth free laborers from moving to the middle class. The majority of whites in the Deep South who never owned African-American slaves were poor.

Many fictional depictions in literature used poor whites as foils in reflecting the positive traits of the protagonist against their perceived "savage" traits. In her novel Dred, Harriet Beecher Stowe illustrates a commonly held stereotype that marriage to them results in genetic degradation and barbarism of the better class.

During the American Civil War, the Poor White comprised a majority of the combatants in the Confederate Army; afterwards, many labored in the rural South as sharecroppers. During the nadir of American race relations at the turn of the 20th century, intense violence, defense of honor and white supremacy flourished in a region suffering from a lack of public education and competition for resources. Southern politicians of the day built on conflict between Poor Whites and African Americans in a form of political opportunism. As John T. Campbell summarizes in The Broad Ax in 1906. The Civil War also caused poor whites to experience intense dire economic conditions and was brought into poverty along with enslaved African-Americans.

In the past, white men have hated white men quite as much as some of them hate the Negro, and have vented their hatred with as much savagery as they ever have against the Negro. The best educated people have the least race prejudice. In the United States the poor white were encouraged to hate the Negroes because they could then be used to help hold the Negroes in slavery. The Negroes were taught to show contempt for the poor white because this would increase the hatred between them and each side could be used by the master to control the other. The real interest of the poor whites and the Negroes were the same, that of resisting the oppression of the master class. But ignorance stood in the way. This race hatred was at first used to perpetuate white supremacy in politics in the South. The poor whites are almost injured by it as are the Negroes.

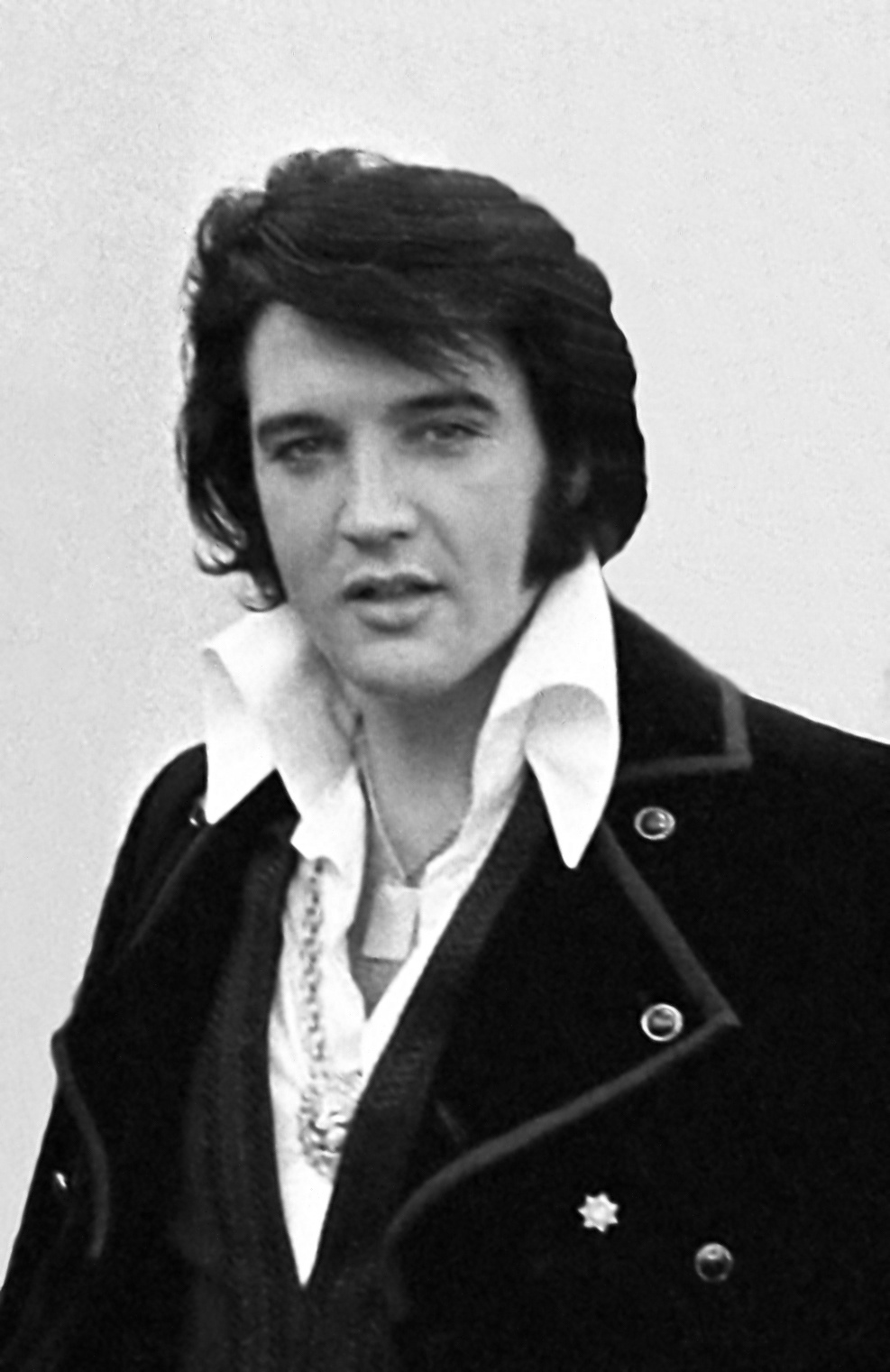
Elvis Presley, an icon of 20th century America, was born into a Poor White family in Tupelo, Mississippi.

Further evidence of the hostility of the ruling class towards the Poor White is found in the enactment by several southern states of a poll tax, which required an annual payment of $1.00 (equivalent to $36 in 2025), to vote, in some cases, or at least payment before voting. The poll tax excluded not only African Americans, but also the many Poor Whites, from voting, as they lived in a barter economy and were cash poor.

In the early 20th century, the image of the Poor White was a prominent stereotype in American media. Sherwood Anderson's novel Poor White (1920) explored how a poor white youth from Missouri tried to adjust to a middle-class world by moving to the Midwest. The American eugenics movement encouraged the legalization of forced sterilizations. In practice, individuals who came from Poor White backgrounds were often targeted, particularly institutionalized individuals and fertile women.

The drafting and recruitment of physically fit individuals in the First World War revealed the first practical comparisons between the Appalachian region, the South, and the rest of the country. The Poor Whites were unequal in terms of income, education, and medical treatment than other White Americans; only African Americans in the Southern states fared worse.

New Deal rural life programs such as the Resettlement Administration, the Farm Security Administration and the Tennessee Valley Authority helped create new jobs for the rural poor during the Great Depression, especially in the South. In the late 1960s under the President Lyndon B. Johnson administration, the Appalachian Regional Commission was founded to deal with persistent poverty in the region. The Second World War led to new economic opportunities; millions of poor farmers moved to industrial centers for high paying jobs. As the century progressed, economic and social conditions for the Poor White continued to improve. However while many social prejudices have since been lifted, popularized stereotypes surrounding the Poor White continued.

=== Culture ===
==== Traditional ====
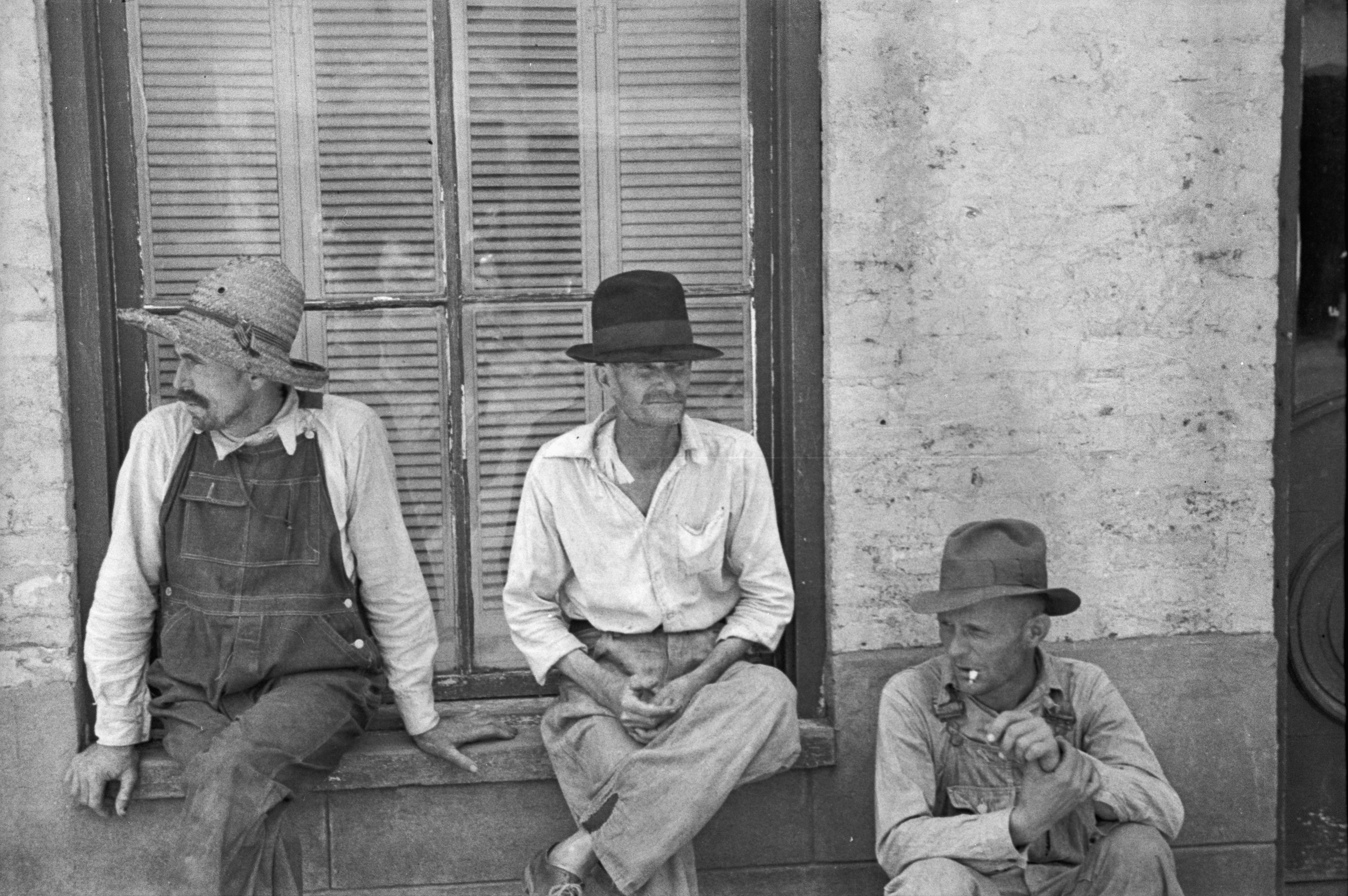
Poor White sharecroppers in Alabama, 1936

Historically, especially in Appalachia, Poor Whites lived somewhat removed from mainstream Southern society. At the turn of the 20th century, Abbott H. Ernest subdivided the Poor White group into the Appalachian "mountain whites" and those who live in the flatlands farther east and west. Affluent whites (known in the South as the Bourbon class) had little interaction with the poor, oftentimes limited to no more than, "whom he would wonder see staring at him from the sides of the highway." The physical and geographic isolation enabled poor whites in Appalachia to develop their own culture.

As was typical in general rural society for generations, the Poor White continued to make many of their necessities by hand. They sewed their own garments and constructed houses in the fashion of log cabins or dogtrots. Traditional clothing was simple: for men, jeans and a collarless, cuffless unbleached-muslin shirt; and for women, a straight skirt with a bonnet of the same material. The Poor White survived by small-scale subsistence agriculture, hunter-gathering, charity, fishing, bartering with enslaved individuals and seeking what employment they could find. Some moved to take jobs in cotton mills and factories, which were originally reserved for whites.

==== Contemporary ====
A broad characterization of the culture, of the descendants of the Poor Whites, includes such elements as strong kinship ties, non-hierarchical religious affiliations, emphasis on manual labor, connection to rural living and nature, and inclination toward self-reliance. In addition, individuals from backgrounds historically rooted among the Poor Whites still carry much of the culture and often continue many of the practices of their forefathers. Hunting and fishing, while practiced by their ancestors as a method of survival, is now seen as a means of recreation. Variations on folk music, particularly Country, still have strong resonance among their descendants. Traditional country music still uses the banjo, dulcimer and fiddle.

19.5 million white Americans have lived below the poverty line in the year 2022. White men without college degrees had their earnings decrease between the years 1970 and 2017. This has led to liver disease, drug overdoses and suicides among white males in the United states.

== South Africa ==
South Africa's Apartheid system created a massive racial wealth gap and widespread poverty among Black South Africans. This inequality continues to this day, with White South Africans still controlling the majority of the country's wealth. Post-Apartheid ANC governments have instituted affirmative action policies to provide greater opportunities for Blacks, but this has had the side-effect of forcing some working-class whites out of employment, creating a small, impoverished and often homeless white underclass.

== See also ==
- Country (identity)
- Cracker (term)
- Culture of the Southern United States
- Hillbilly
- Peckerwood
- Plain Folk of the Old South
- Poor Whites in South Africa
- Redleg
- Redneck
- Social and economic stratification in Appalachia
- White trash
- Yokel
- Poverty in the United States
