= History of the Appalachian people in Metro Detroit =

The Metro Detroit region of Michigan is home to a significant Appalachian population, one of the largest populations of Urban Appalachians in the United States. The most common state of origin for Appalachian people in Detroit is Kentucky, while many others came from Tennessee, West Virginia, Virginia, Ohio, and elsewhere in the Appalachia region. The Appalachian population has historically been centered in the Detroit neighborhoods of Brightmoor, Springwells, Corktown and North Corktown, as well as the Detroit suburbs of Hazel Park, Ypsilanti, Taylor, and Warren. Beginning after World War I, Appalachian people moved to Detroit in large numbers seeking jobs. Between 1940 and 1970, approximately 3.2 million Appalachian and Southern migrants settled in the Midwest, particularly in large cities such as Detroit and Chicago. This massive influx of rural Appalachian people into Northern and Midwestern cities has been called the "Hillbilly Highway". The culture of Metro Detroit has been significantly influenced by the culture, music, and politics of Appalachia. The majority of people of Appalachian heritage in Metro Detroit are Christian and either white or black, though Appalachian people can be of any race, ethnicity, or religion.

== History ==
Between 1940 and 1960, around 7 million Appalachian people migrated to the North. During World War II, Appalachian people worked in war factories and automobile manufacturing, in part due to the decline of coal mining in Appalachia. The Immigration Act of 1924, which restricted immigration from Eastern and Southern Europe and Asia, also created a shortage of working-class immigrants in Northern cities, a role that was filled by many working-class Appalachian migrants. Northern industrialists believed Appalachian people to possess mechanical aptitude and a Protestant work ethic, and felt that Appalachian people lacked the political radicalism and unionism often found among Eastern and Southern European immigrants. While "Hillbilly Highway" is a metaphor, many Appalachian people who arrived in Detroit literally traveled along "Hillbilly Highways" such as U.S. Route 23 and Interstate 75. In Chad Berry's Southern Migrants, Northern Exiles, he claims that 66,000 white Appalachian people resided in Detroit in 1930. Many were from Eastern Kentucky, particularly Harlan County. About 1,000 people a year left Harlan County each year in the 1950s, so many that a bus line ran daily departures from Harlan to Detroit.

Many Appalachian people settled in southwest Detroit. Southwestern Detroit was once a predominantly Polish neighborhood, before Appalachian people became predominant. The area is now referred to by locals as Mexicantown and boasts a large Latino immigrant population, particularly because many of the Appalachian people have aged and died, moved to the suburbs, or moved back to the South.

== Discrimination ==
Poor Appalachian people who arrived in Metro Detroit were often looked down upon with disdain. Appalachian people were stereotyped as backwards, their homes were considered eyesores, and landlords sometimes refused to rent to them believing that the neighborhood would become an Appalachian enclave. In a 1953 survey conducted by Wayne State University, Detroit residents were asked to identify "undesirable people" in the city; "Poor Southern whites" and "hillbillies" were tied at the top with criminals and gangsters as the most undesirable, being considered more undesirable than "Negroes", "drifters", and "transients".

In a socioeconomic research study conducted by Roscoe Griffin that spanned from 1945 to 1950 on households of the Pine Mountain School district in Kentucky (made up of migrants), unique characteristics were identified that alienated the community from modern communities. Griffin noted two characteristics of the community, indifference towards developing formal organizations/lack of participation in existing ones and an overall lack of resistance to the severe widespread poverty in their community. Referring to this situation, Griffin suggested cultural, geographical, and religious constraint explanations.

Appalachian people faced ridicule for their appearance and accent. Due to social exclusion and cultural affinity, many Appalachian people decided to live amongst other Appalachians in tight-knit communities, these communities still exist today in small cities such as Hazel Park. Due to the insularity of these Appalachian communities, some of the children and grandchildren of people from Appalachia still speak with a strong Appalachian/Southern accent.

== Culture ==
=== Labor unionism ===
In a 1935 article in The Nation, Louis Adamic wrote that "hill-billies" were believed by Detroit auto manufacturing employers to be "safe" – that is, not inclined to unionize. Adamic reports that automotive companies were recruiting during the early 1930s with the belief that these rural people had not been influenced by ideas of unionism. The article goes on to report that the hill-billies were looked down upon by almost everyone due to their extremely low standard of living, lack of familiarity with modern plumbing, and because they were seen as taking away jobs from the old-time automotive workers. The advent of assembly lines meant that unskilled workers could ably perform tasks at manufacturing plants, which made Appalachian migrants adequate employees for the work.

=== Migrant identity ===
The Appalachian people who migrated to Detroit (and in smaller numbers to Flint) in order to work in the automotive plants gained an identity distinct from the one that they possessed in their home state. In their home states, people saw themselves as distinct from those living in other parts of the state, or in a different part of the South. Once they migrated to Michigan, they were lumped together as southern white laborers, and a group consciousness based on that label emerged. Migrants from all over Appalachia began to feel a social solidarity with each other, preferring to work and live beside other Southerners than with Northerners. It was believed that the Appalachian migrants assimilated less rapidly than Northern rural migrants because of their group consciousness and the persistence of certain southern regional attitudes, and an acute awareness of the difference between themselves and other native-born white Americans. Because the Appalachian migrants didn't have cultural context for situations they encountered in northern industrial cities, their reactions were dictated by their rural southern lives and attitudes. During holidays and lay-offs, most of the migrants went back to their old homes. During lay-offs in Flint, MI, as many as 35% of the migrants would return to their old homes.

While many Appalachian people in Detroit are white Appalachians, and Appalachian identity is often stereotyped as exclusively white, there is a large Black Appalachian population in Detroit. Because Appalachia is stereotyped as an all-white region, the identities and narratives of Black, Latino, Indigenous and other Appalachians of color are frequently neglected, marginalized, and obscured. Detroit and Chicago were leading destinations for Black Appalachian people, many of whom previously worked in coal mining.

=== Cuisine ===
Beans are an important element of Appalachian cuisine in Metro Detroit. Beans were important to Appalachian people, who often came from rural poverty, because they were cheap, nutritious, and could be easily farmed in a backyard lot. Beans are often served in chafing dishes. Soup beans are commonly served at meals either as the main course or as a side dish, often using Pinto beans or Navy beans. Other common foods in Appalachian cuisine include cornbread, fried cabbage, and stack cakes.

=== Music ===
Metro Detroit has long been home to a bluegrass and honky tonk scene. Several bars and restaurants in Detroit such as Red's Park-Inn bar, Telway Diner, Alice's Bar, and George's Famous Coney Island have reputations as hang-out spots for Appalachian/Southern people. In 1973, the New York Times reported that some 25 "hillbilly heaven" bars existed in Detroit, the closest thing to an Appalachian community center.

Bobby Bare, a popular country singer from Ohio, had a hit song with "Detroit City" in 1963 which described the homesickness and culture shock commonly experienced by Southern migrants.

=== Literature ===
Harriette Simpson Arnow's novel The Dollmaker is a fictional account of an Appalachian family's migration from rural Kentucky to Detroit during World War II. The work has been praised for its realistic depiction of working-class life. The Dollmaker has been adapted into a 1984 made-for-television drama film starring Jane Fonda.

== Politics ==
Sign posted in response to proposed Sojourner Truth Housing Project, February 1942. Photograph by Arthur Siegel.

Many rural white migrants from Appalachia and the South carried deep-rooted Southern racist beliefs towards African-Americans and others. Racists among the white Appalachian population feared that African-Americans were competitors for jobs and housing. Working-class Black Appalachian and Southern people in Metro Detroit were multiply oppressed, facing both racism and classism. Poor and working-class Black Appalachian people competed for low-income jobs with European immigrants and white Appalachians, while facing discriminatory barriers and second-class status from landlords and employers. The white racism that divided the working class in Detroit culminated in the 1943 Detroit race riot. On the evening of June 20, 1943, youths in Belle Isle Park began to riot, with the unrest spreading across the city. 25 African-Americans were murdered and hundreds were injured, mostly at the hands of white police officers. The riot was suppressed when 6,000 federal troops were ordered into the city.

== Religion ==
A 1973 New York Times article claimed that churches were a unifying gathering place for Appalachian people, referring to "the city's fundamentalist churches that perpetuate the frontier faith of the hills", alluding to Protestant and Evangelical denominations of Christianity such as Pentecostalism which involve emotionally expressive forms of worship, faith healing, and belief in literal notions of Heaven and Hell. Faith Pentecostal chapel in Hazel Park was cited as one of these churches.

== Notable Appalachian-Americans from Metro Detroit ==
- Harriette Simpson Arnow, a Kentucky-born novelist known for her writings about the people of the Southern Appalachian Mountains.

== See also ==
- 1943 Detroit race riot
- Appalachian stereotypes
- Appalachian studies
- Great Migration (African American)
- Hillbilly
- Hillbilly Highway
- Mountain white
- Poor White
- Redneck
- The Dollmaker
- The Dollmaker (novel)
- Trailer trash
- Urban Appalachians
- White trash

== Bibliography ==
- Wolcott, Victoria W. Remaking Respectability: African-American Women in Interwar Detroit . Chapel Hill: University of North Carolina Press, 2001.
