= History of the Appalachian people in Chicago =

The city of Chicago, Illinois is home to a significant Appalachian population. The Appalachian community has historically been centered in the neighborhood of Uptown. Beginning after World War I, Appalachian people moved to Chicago in droves seeking jobs. Between 1940 and 1970, approximately 3.2 million Appalachian and Southern migrants settled in Chicago and elsewhere in the Midwest. Due to immigration restrictions in the 1920s, personnel managers in Chicago encouraged working-class migrants from the Upland South to fill those jobs. The culture of Chicago has been significantly influenced by the culture, music, and politics of Appalachia. The majority of people of Appalachian heritage in Chicago are white or black, though Appalachian people can be of any race, ethnicity, or religion.

== History ==
Between the 1940s and the 1960s, up to 400,000 African-Americans moved to Chicago from the Deep South, mostly from the states of Alabama, Georgia, and Mississippi. Following the Korean War, around 70,000 white people from the Mid-South moved to Chicago. These white people were mostly from the mountainous Appalachia region of Eastern Tennessee, Kentucky, North Carolina, and West Virginia. By the 1950s and 1960s, the Uptown neighborhood of Chicago had gained a reputation as a "Hillbilly Heaven". For several decades, the neighborhood was locally famous for being an enclave of white Southern migrants, many of whom were from Appalachia. While many Appalachian and Southern migrants settled in other Chicago neighborhoods, the Appalachian population was the densest and the poorest in Uptown. There was still a substantial Appalachian presence in Uptown by the 1970s, but by the 1990s the Appalachian community had largely dissipated.

== Culture ==
Carol's Pub, a country-and-western bar established in 1972, is one of the few remaining legacies of the Appalachian community in Uptown.

== Politics ==
In the 1960s and 1970s, the Young Patriots Organization operated in Uptown. The YPO was a socialist, anti-racist organization composed primarily of young, poor white migrants from Appalachia, although membership was open to people of all races. The Young Patriots organized alongside other militant groups such as the Young Lords and the Black Panther Party as part of Fred Hampton's Rainbow Coalition. The Young Patriots grew out of a hillbilly street gang known as the Peace Makers and initially wore the Confederate flag, but eventually stopped wearing the flag out of respect for the Black Panthers.

== Religion ==
Appalachian migrants to Chicago were overwhelmingly Protestant. Some migrants came from such isolated areas that they had never met any Catholics or Jews prior to migrating to Chicago. Appalachian Southern Baptists founded numerous churches in Chicago. Chicago only had 9 Southern Baptist Convention-affiliated churches in 1950, but by 1959 that number had increased to more than 70 churches.

== Notable Appalachian-Americans from Chicago ==
- Steve Harvey, a comedian, businessman and entertainer born in Welch, West Virginia.
- Ada "Bricktop" Smith, a dancer, jazz singer, vaudevillian, and saloon-keeper born in Alderson, West Virginia.

== See also ==
- Uptown, Chicago
- Young Patriots Organization
- Appalachian stereotypes
- Appalachian studies
- Great Migration (African American)
- Hillbilly
- Hillbilly Highway
- Mountain white
- Poor White
- Redneck
- Trailer trash
- Urban Appalachians
- White trash

== Bibliography ==
Roger Guy, From Diversity to Unity: Southern and Appalachian Migrants in Uptown Chicago, 1950-1970, Lexington Books, Cleveland, 2009.
