= Detroit St. Patrick's Parade =

Annual Detroit parade

- Genre: Parade
- Date: The Sunday preceding St. Patrick's Day
- Frequency: Annual
- Locations: Corktown, Detroit, Michigan, United States
- Inaugurated: 1958
- Attendance: 80,000
- Organiser: United Irish Societies
- Sponsor: Ford Motor Company
- Website: detroitstpatricksparade.com

The Detroit St. Patrick's Parade is an annual parade held on the Sunday preceding St. Patrick's Day Corktown, Detroit, Michigan.

The parade has been held each year since 1958 (except 2020 & 2021 due to the COVID-19 pandemic), and is hosted by the United Irish Societies. The first parade was in Dearborn, Michigan. Today, the Parade route begins at UIS Irish Plaza and follows along Michigan Avenue and proceeds through Corktown.

== See also ==
- Culture of Detroit
- List of holiday parades
