= The Dollmaker =

1984 television film directed by Daniel Petrie

- Genre: Drama
- Based on: The Dollmaker by Harriette Arnow
- Written by: Susan Cooper; Hume Cronyn
- Directed by: Daniel Petrie
- Starring: Jane Fonda
- Music by: John Rubinstein
- Country of origin: United States
- Original language: English

Production
- Executive producer: Bruce Gilbert
- Producer: Bill Finnegan
- Production locations: Cades Cove, Great Smoky Mountains National Park - 107 Park Headquarters Road, Gatlinburg, Tennessee
- Cinematography: Paul Lohmann
- Editor: Rita Roland
- Running time: 150 minutes
- Production companies: Finnegan Productions; IPC Films

Original release
- Network: ABC
- Release: May 13, 1984

The Dollmaker is a 1984 American made-for-television drama film starring Jane Fonda and based on the 1954 novel written by Harriette Arnow. It was originally broadcast on ABC on May 13, 1984.

Fonda was awarded the Primetime Emmy Award for Outstanding Lead Actress in a Limited Series or Movie. Director Daniel Petrie won the Directors Guild of America Award for Outstanding Directorial Achievement in Dramatic Specials.

Filming took place on location at an abandoned steel mill in Chicago, Illinois for scenes set in Detroit and in the Cades Cove area of the Great Smoky Mountains National Park in Tennessee for scenes set in Appalachia.

== Plot summary ==
The film is the story of a family that moves from their rural home in Appalachia to Detroit, Michigan, where the father intends to find work in a factory. Gertie is hesitant to leave their home; her husband Clovis believes that it will bring the family a regular income and better way of life. What Gertie finds is a new place to exist, rather than live, and the family settles down in a tar paper shack by the railroad tracks in an industrial neighborhood.

All the while Gertie holds onto her homespun ways, one of which is carving. Clovis begins to dismiss her talents and puts down Gertie for holding onto her folk art in a modern world. Still, her handiwork is admired by those around her. One of the items that she hangs onto is a piece of a tree limb in which she sees a figure of Jesus calling to her to carve from it.

One setback after another begins to pull the family apart. Clovis doesn't find work and begins to get involved with matters that trouble Gertie; her children begin to also get involved in unsavory affairs.

The event that breaks Gertie's passivity to her situation is the death of her youngest daughter, who is killed by a railroad car. She confronts her husband, whose best intentions have led the family to this tragedy. Gertie decides that she will earn enough money to get the family back home to where it belongs. To do this she will make dolls, but she has no material from which she can carve the dolls. It is then that she takes the treasured piece of lumber that she longed to carve the Christ figure from, and splits it with an axe. From one piece of wood, she will carve many dolls. It is the only way to save the family.

From this sacrifice, the family is able to return home.

== Cast ==
- Jane Fonda as Gertie Nevels
- Levon Helm as Clovis Nevels
- Amanda Plummer as Mamie Childers
- Susan Kingsley as Sophronie Meanwell
- Ann Hearn as Max
- Bob Swan as Victor
- Geraldine Page as Mrs. Kendrick
- Jason Yearwood as Reuben
- David Brady Wilson as Enoch
- Starla Whaley as Clytie
- David Dawson as Amos
- Nikki Creswell as Cassie
- Raymond Serra as Joe
- Dan Hedaya as Skyros
- Ellen Marchman as Wheateye
- Sheb Wooley as Mr. Kendrick
