= Pennsyltucky =

Term for the rural part of Pennsylvania

Coordinates: 41°N 78°W

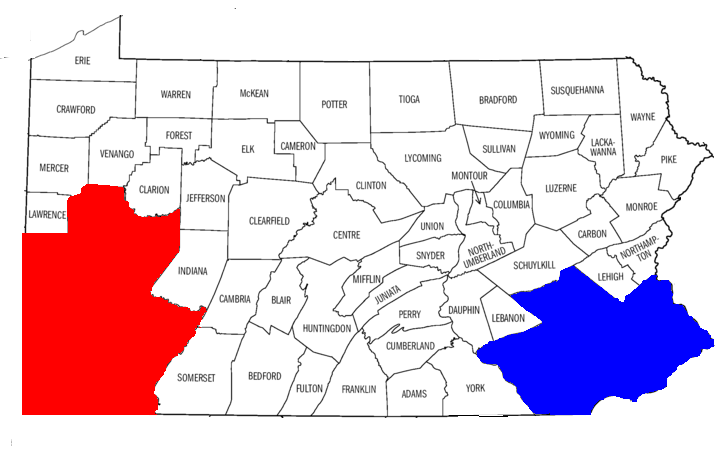
"Pennsyltucky": The Pittsburgh metropolitan area is in red, the Philadelphia metropolitan area is in blue, and the "Pennsyltucky counties" are white.

Pennsyltucky is a slang term used to characterize—usually deprecatingly—the rural part of the U.S. state of Pennsylvania outside the Pittsburgh and Philadelphia metropolitan areas. It is a portmanteau of the names of Pennsylvania and the nearby state of Kentucky. The term is also used to refer to the people and culture of the Appalachian region, particularly its central core, which runs from Pennsylvania to Kentucky. The Lehigh Valley is not usually referred to as Pennsyltucky.

== Explanation ==
The word implies a similarity between the two states' mostly rural sections, a connection that exists in fact after numbers of Western Pennsylvanians left the state for Kentucky after the Whiskey Rebellion. It can be used in either a pejorative or an affectionate sense.

=== The "T" ===
Pennsyltucky is interchangeable with the slang term The "T", because of the shape of Pennsylvania when excluding the Philadelphia and Pittsburgh Metro areas. "The T" is used primarily in a political context (e.g., "Winning the T"), and is considered a more politically correct term than "Pennsyltucky" when referring to potential voters without so openly insulting them.

The regions of Philadelphia in the southeast corner, Pittsburgh in the southwest area are urban manufacturing centers, with the T-shaped remainder of the state being much more rural; this dichotomy affects state politics and culture as well as the state economy.

=== Western Pennsylvania ===
Much of the term's history evolved from the Appalachian area of Pennsylvania, which includes most of the T and most of the Pittsburgh area. Since the early 1800s, Pittsburgh has been one of America's major cities with a distinct association unto itself, separate from the Midwest and the East coast, but bordering both. Its geographic proximity to Ohio and West Virginia creates an Ohio River Valley feel in contrast to the near coastal metropolis of Philadelphia surrounded by Delaware and New Jersey as well as DC (which is geographically closer than Philadelphia).

Pittsburgh did not grow radially as most other major American cities but resembled a miles-long "spider" of urbanity up river valleys such as the Monongahela, Allegheny, and Beaver rivers and Chartiers Creek among others. For much of the 20th century the result was a major sprawling metropolis that just a mile on either side of a valley was as wild and natural as the most remote parts of the state. Even with today's suburban sprawl, very wild bluffs and hollows remain as a web of "green belts" throughout the Pittsburgh metro area. For these reasons notable people familiar with Western Pennsylvania also include Pittsburgh and its immediate area in the "Pennsyltucky" definition.

== History ==
The term Pennsyltucky can be traced back over a century. Many of the earlier uses appear to be humorous references to a fictitious state. For example, Pennsyltucky is the name of the ship in the 1942 Popeye cartoon "Baby Wants a Bottleship". By the 1970s, the term clearly referred to rural Pennsylvania, as evidenced by country music star Jeannie Seely's 1972 single "A Farm in Pennsyltucky" about her childhood home in northwestern Pennsylvania. Also in 1972, Richard Elman writes in his semi-autobiographical Fredi & Shirl & The Kids that the character Fredi refers to all of Appalachia as Pennsyltucky.

The modern popularization of the term is commonly associated with Democratic political consultant James Carville, who worked on President Bill Clinton's first presidential campaign. Carville's original statement did not speak of "Pennsyltucky," instead comparing it to another rural Southern state, Alabama. In 1986, while working on Robert Casey, Sr.'s successful gubernatorial campaign, he said:

Between Paoli and Penn Hills, Pennsylvania is Alabama without the blacks. They didn't film The Deer Hunter there for nothing – the state has the second-highest concentration of NRA members, behind Texas.

This quote is often paraphrased as "Philadelphia in the east, Pittsburgh in the west, and Alabama in the middle", or alternatively, "Pennsylvania is Philadelphia and Pittsburgh separated by Alabama".

== See Also ==
- Butternut (people)
- Hillbilly Highway
- Upland South
- Urban Appalachians
