= Getting Out (disambiguation) =

Getting Out is a 1978 play by American playwright Marsha Norman.

Getting Out may also refer to:

- Getting Out, a 1994 TV film adaptation of Norman's play, with Rebecca De Mornay and Robert Knepper
- "Getting Out", 21st episode of the 6th season of the American television series Judging Amy
- "Getting Out", 10th episode of the 3rd season of the British television series Within These Walls
- "Getting Out", a song by Daniel Merriweather from the album Love & War (Daniel Merriweather album)
- Application GTL GettingOut, used to communicate with incarcerated individuals
