= UIS Irish Plaza =

- UIS Irish Plaza from 6th Street
- Interactive map of UIS Irish Plaza
- Type: Municipal (Michigan Department of Transportation)
- Location: Corktown, Detroit
- Coordinates: 42°19′52.1″N 83°3′41.8″W
- Created: 2006
- Operator: United Irish Societies
- Open: All year
- Public transit: DDOT Michigan & 5th

UIS Irish Plaza, or United Irish Societies Irish Plaza, is a park and memorial dedicated to honoring Metro Detroit's Irish immigrant community and their descendants.

== History ==
The flags at the UIS Irish Plaza

Led by Ed Neubacher and Mike McGunn, with graphic assistance by Margaret O'Neill, the project began in 2001 when Michigan Department of Transportation granted the United Irish Societies permission to use the property for a commemorative plaza. Funding for project was obtained through the sale of various elements of the landscape and hardscape, the primary components being engraved brick pavers. On Sunday, May 21, 2006 the United Irish Societies Irish Plaza was dedicated as a "memorial for past and present members of the Irish community, and the starting point for the St. Patrick's Parade for present and future generations to come."

It continues to be used as the starting point for the Detroit St. Patrick's Parade, and a gathering place for various events in the Detroit Irish community.

The memorial pavers at the UIS Irish Plaza

== See also ==
- Corktown
- North Corktown
