= Susan Kingsley =

American actress (1946–1984)

- Born: March 1, 1946; Middlesboro, Kentucky, United States
- Died: February 6, 1984 (aged 37); Commerce, Georgia, United States
- Occupation: Actor

Susan Kingsley was an American actress, with roles in films such as Steel (1979), Popeye (1980), Coal Miner's Daughter (1980), and The Dollmaker (1984).

== Early life and education ==
Kingsley was born to Ballard and Treecy Cardwell in Middlesboro, at the southeast corner of Kentucky. Her marriage to Louisville architect Robert Kingsley ended in divorce. She studied drama at the University of Kentucky and at the London Academy of Music and Dramatic Art.

== Career ==
Kingsley was a member of Actors Theatre of Louisville, where she appeared in the main role of Marsha Norman's play Getting Out. The play had an off-Broadway run in New York, where she won high praise from critics and a Theatre World Award and an Outer Critics' Circle Award.

She also played the role of Marshael Foster in the Broadway play The Wake of Jamey Foster in October 1982. The play was unsuccessful but she again won critical acclaim.

Kingsley appeared in films including Coal Miner's Daughter, Popeye, Reckless, Steel, Old Enough, Sunshine On the Way, and The Dollmaker.

== Death ==
On February 6, 1984, as Kingsley was returning to Louisville, Kentucky in order to rehearse a play at Actors Theatre, after a vacation in Florida, she was involved in an automobile accident near Commerce, Georgia. The injuries she suffered from the accident led to her death. She is buried at Roselawn Memorial Gardens in Middlesboro, Kentucky, and was survived by her husband David Hurt, and two children. The (Louisville) Courier-Journal said she "was clearly in the process of becoming one of America's foremost actresses."
