= Upland South =

Geographic region in the Southern US

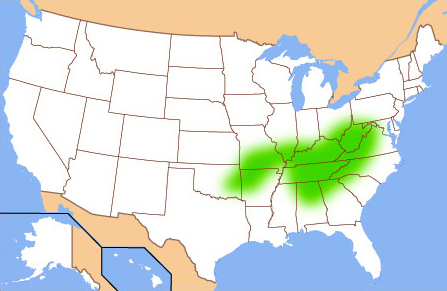
The Upland South is defined by landform, history, and culture, and does not correspond well to state lines. This map shows the approximate region known as the Upland South.

The Upland South and Upper South are two overlapping cultural and geographic subregions in the inland part of the Southern United States. They differ from the Deep South and Atlantic coastal plain by terrain, history, economics, demographics, and settlement patterns.

The term Upper South is a geographic term, generally consisting of the Southern states that are geographically north of the Lower or Deep South, primarily Virginia, West Virginia, Kentucky, Tennessee, North Carolina, and Oklahoma and to a lesser extent the District of Columbia, Maryland, and Delaware.

The Upland South does not neatly conform to state boundaries. Combining boundaries of the region proposed by several scholars, Jordan-Bychkov describes the Upland South as a region which "stretches from the Fall Line, at the inner margin of the Atlantic coastal plain, through southern Appalachia, across the Ohio River into southern Indiana and Illinois, where it is very nearly severed in two at the isthmus of the Shawnee Hills, and then southwestward through the Ozarks, Ouchitas, and the Hill Country of Texas."

The Upland South is partially defined by elevation above sea level; it is west of the population centers on the East Coast. It has its own history and culture, originating in Appalachia. It includes West Virginia, Virginia, Kentucky, Tennessee, Arkansas (Ozarks and Ouachitas), Missouri (Ozarks), North Carolina (Piedmont and mountains), South Carolina (upstate), Georgia (northern), Alabama (northern), Mississippi (northern hill country), Indiana (southern), Ohio (southern and Appalachian Ohio), and Illinois (Shawnee Hills). Parts of Pennsylvania (southwestern Appalachia), Oklahoma (eastern hill region), Texas (northeast) are also often included. Upland South outposts were settled along the shores of the Ohio River.

== Geography ==
The United States map of Köppen climate classification

There is a slight difference in usage between the two terms "Upland South" and "Upper South." The "Upland South" is usually defined based on landforms. This generally refers to the southern Appalachian Mountains or Appalachia region (although not the full region as defined by the Appalachian Regional Commission), the Ozarks and Ouachita Mountains. Also included in the Upland South are the plateaus, hills, and basins between the Appalachians and Ozarks, such as the Cumberland Plateau, part of the Allegheny Plateau, the Nashville Basin, the Shawnee Hills, and the Bluegrass Basin, among others. The southern Piedmont region is often considered part of the Upland South, while the Atlantic Coastal Plain (the Chesapeake region and South Carolina's Lowcountry) are not.

Status of the states, 1861: States that seceded before April 15, 1861 States that seceded after April 15, 1861 Southern border states that permitted slavery, Kentucky and Missouri both had dual competing Confederate and Unionist governments Union states that banned slavery Territories

In contrast, the term "Upper South" tends to be defined politically by state boundaries. The term dates to the early 19th century and the rise of the Lower South, which became noted for its differences from the more northerly parts of the American South. In antebellum times, the term Upper South generally referred to the slave states north of the Lower or Deep South. During the American Civil War era, the term Upper South was often used to refer specifically to the Confederate states that did not secede until after the attack on Fort Sumter—Virginia, North Carolina, Tennessee, and Arkansas. This can also include the southern border states of Kentucky, Missouri, West Virginia, Maryland, and Delaware as Upper South. Today, although many definitions are still based on Civil War–era politics, the term Upper South is often used for all of the American South north of the Deep South region.

The Encyclopædia Britannica defines the Upper South as the states of North Carolina, Tennessee, Virginia, Kentucky, and West Virginia. The Upper/Upland South is also described in the Encyclopædia Britannica as the "Yeoman South," in contrast to the "Plantation South."

The Upland South, being defined by landforms, also includes parts of Lower South states, such as northwestern South Carolina (the Upstate), North Georgia, North Alabama, and northeastern Mississippi. It also includes parts of some Northern states, such as Southern Illinois (generally the Shawnee Hills region), Southern Indiana, Southern Ohio, and extreme southwestern Pennsylvania. Eastern Oklahoma, North Texas, and Western Maryland are generally included as well.

In the same way, the Upland South usually does not include parts of some Upper South states. This includes areas such as eastern Arkansas, the Missouri Bootheel, the Purchase area of Kentucky, and West Tennessee, which are part of a region called the Mid-South. The Arkansas Delta and West Tennessee area are sometimes considered part of the Deep South or Deep South adjacent. The Upland South also does not include the coastal lowlands of North Carolina, Virginia, and Maryland, located in the Tidewater region.

Despite these differences, the two terms, Upland South and Upper South, refer to the same general region—the northern part of the American South—and are frequently used synonymously. The corresponding terms, Lower South and Deep South, similarly refer to the same general region that is south of and lower in elevation, than the Upland or Upper South. Likewise, the terms Lower South and Deep South are often used interchangeably.

== History ==
The Upland South differs from the Lowland South in several significant ways. These include terrain, history and politics, economics, demographics, and settlement patterns.

=== Origins ===
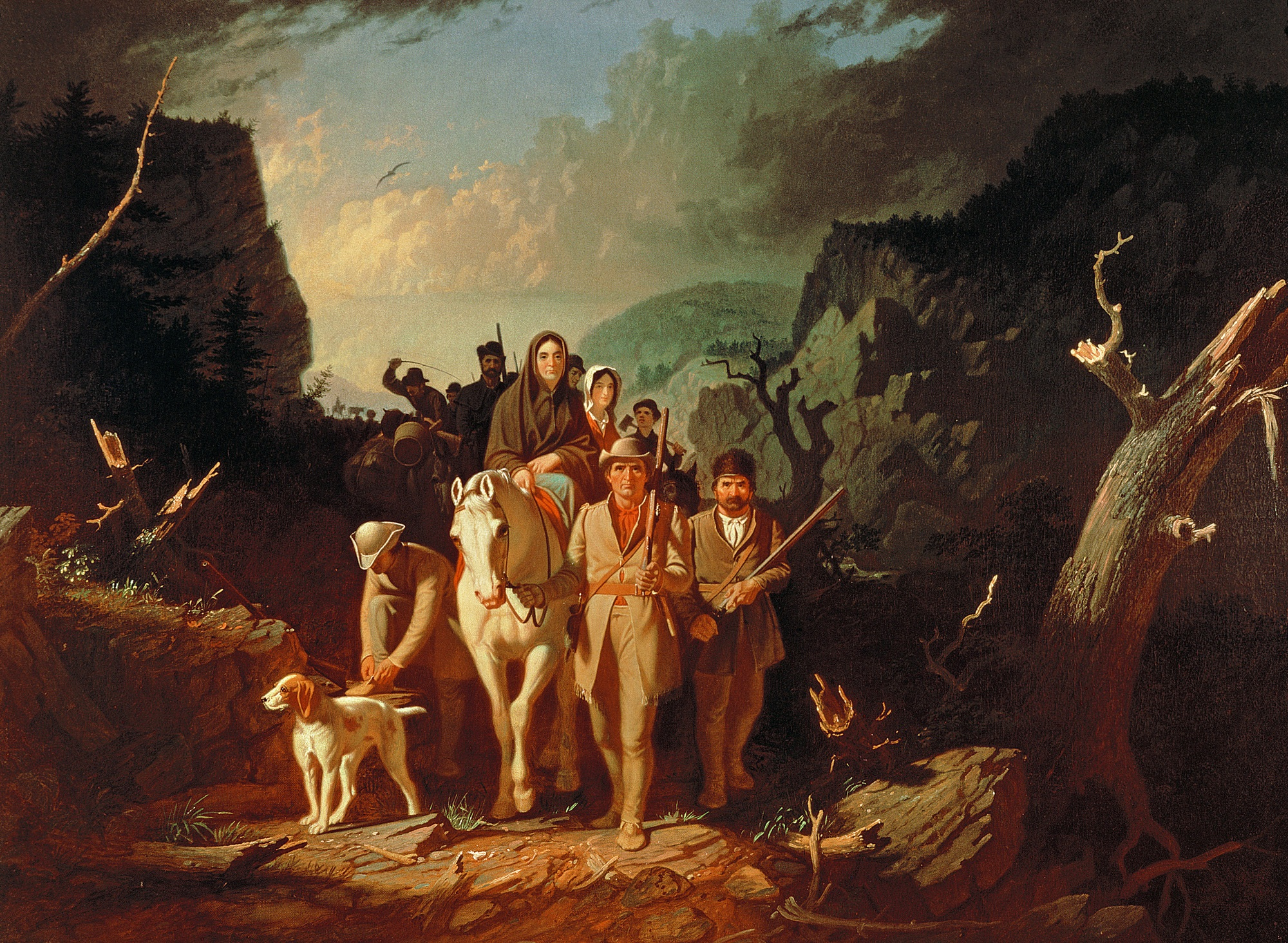
"Daniel Boone escorting settlers through the Cumberland Gap", painted by George Caleb Bingham, 1851–1852

The Upland South emerged as a distinct region in the late 18th century and early 19th century. Migration and settlement patterns from colonial coastal regions into the interior had been established for many decades, but the scale grew dramatically toward the end of the 18th century. The general pattern was a westward migration from the Lowcountry and Piedmont regions of Virginia, North Carolina, and Maryland, as well as a southwestern migration from Pennsylvania. Large numbers of European immigrants arrived in Philadelphia and followed the Great Wagon Road west and south into the Appalachian Highlands, via the Great Appalachian Valley. These migration streams from Virginia and Pennsylvania resulted in the Shenandoah Valley becoming well-settled as early as 1750. The early settlers of the Ohio Valley were mainly Upland Southerners. Much of the culture of the Upland South originated in southeastern Pennsylvania and spread down the Shenandoah Valley.

These migration streams eventually spread through Appalachia and westward through the Appalachian Plateau region into the Ozarks and Ouachitas, and ultimately contributed to the settlement of the Texas Hill Country. The main ethnicities of these early settlers included English, Scots-Irish, Scottish, and German. The early culture of the Upland South was influenced by other European ethnicities. For example, the Swedes and Finns of New Sweden—relatively few in number but pioneers in Pennsylvania before the Germans and Irish arrived—contributed techniques of forest pioneering such as the log cabin, the "zig-zag" split-rail fence, and frontier methods of shifting cultivation, such as girdling trees and using slash and burn methods to convert forest into temporary crop and pasture land.

The pattern of settlement that had begun in the Appalachian foothills was continued and extended through the mountains and highlands to the west and across the Mississippi River into the Ozark highland region. Where there was the danger of Indian attacks, people settled at first in clustered "stations," but as danger lessened, settlement tended to be in a rural, dispersed, kin-structured pattern, with relatively few cities and towns. These early settlers of the Upland South tended to practice small-scale farming, stock raising, and hunting. This settlement pattern of the Upland South was markedly different from that of the Deep South and the Midwest.

A significant portion of 19th-century settlers of the Midwest was from the Upland South. The southern Midwest was most heavily settled by Upland Southerners, especially in Missouri, southern Indiana, and southern Illinois. This early migration to the southern Midwest included many African Americans. They were mainly freed slaves, but slavery was permitted in some places such as St. Louis, under the Missouri Compromise of 1820. In the mid-19th century, there were concentrations of African Americans in east-central Indiana, southwest Michigan, and elsewhere. Due to their early settlement of the Midwest, Upland Southerners initially controlled territorial and state governments, and played a major role in establishing the political and social culture, such as the Black Laws of Ohio, Indiana, and Illinois. Throughout the 19th century, the population percentage of Upland Southerners fell, especially as large numbers of native-born Midwesterners joined the population.

=== Distinct from neighboring regions ===
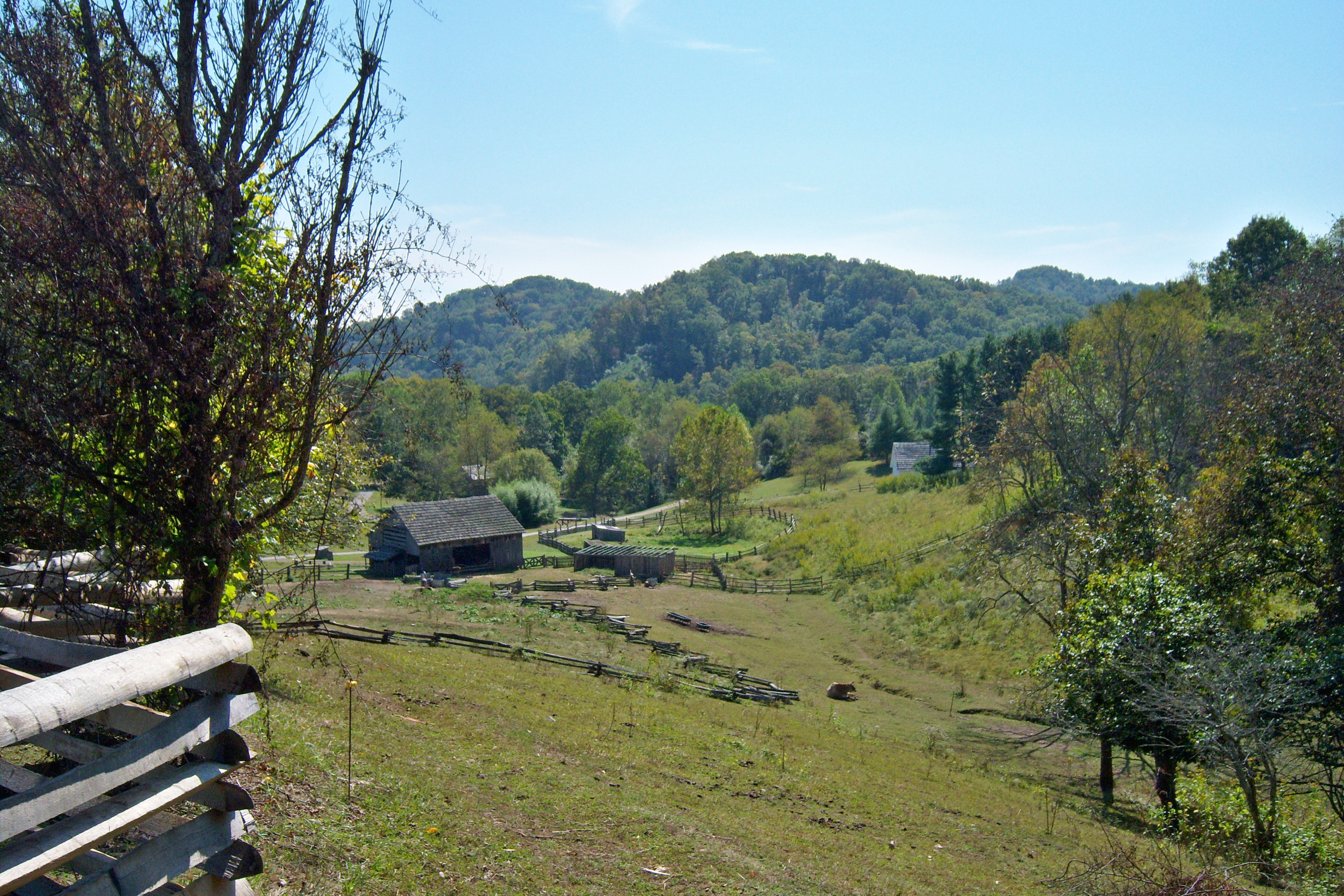
Johnson County in Eastern Kentucky

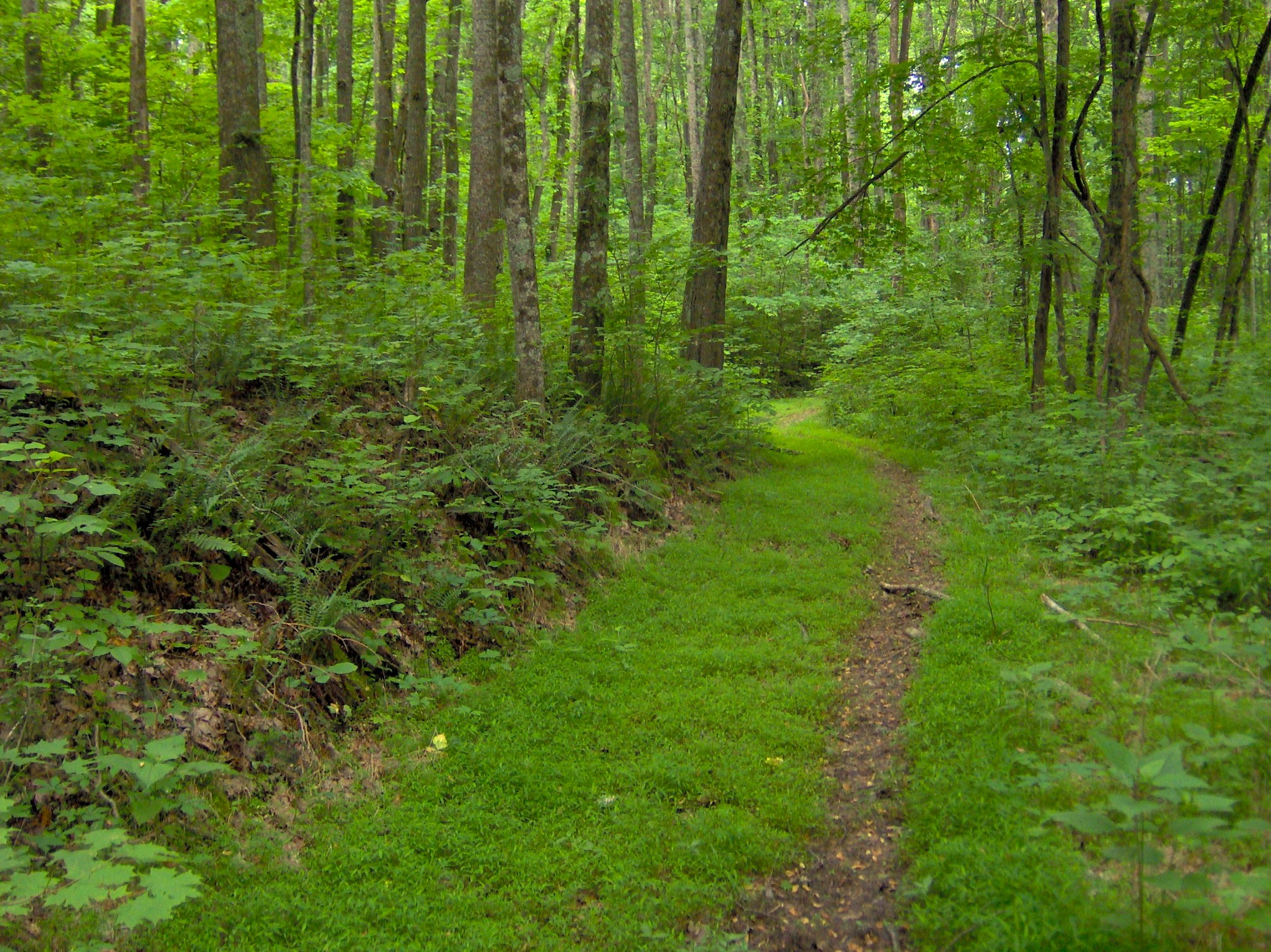
Hardwood forest in Middle Tennessee

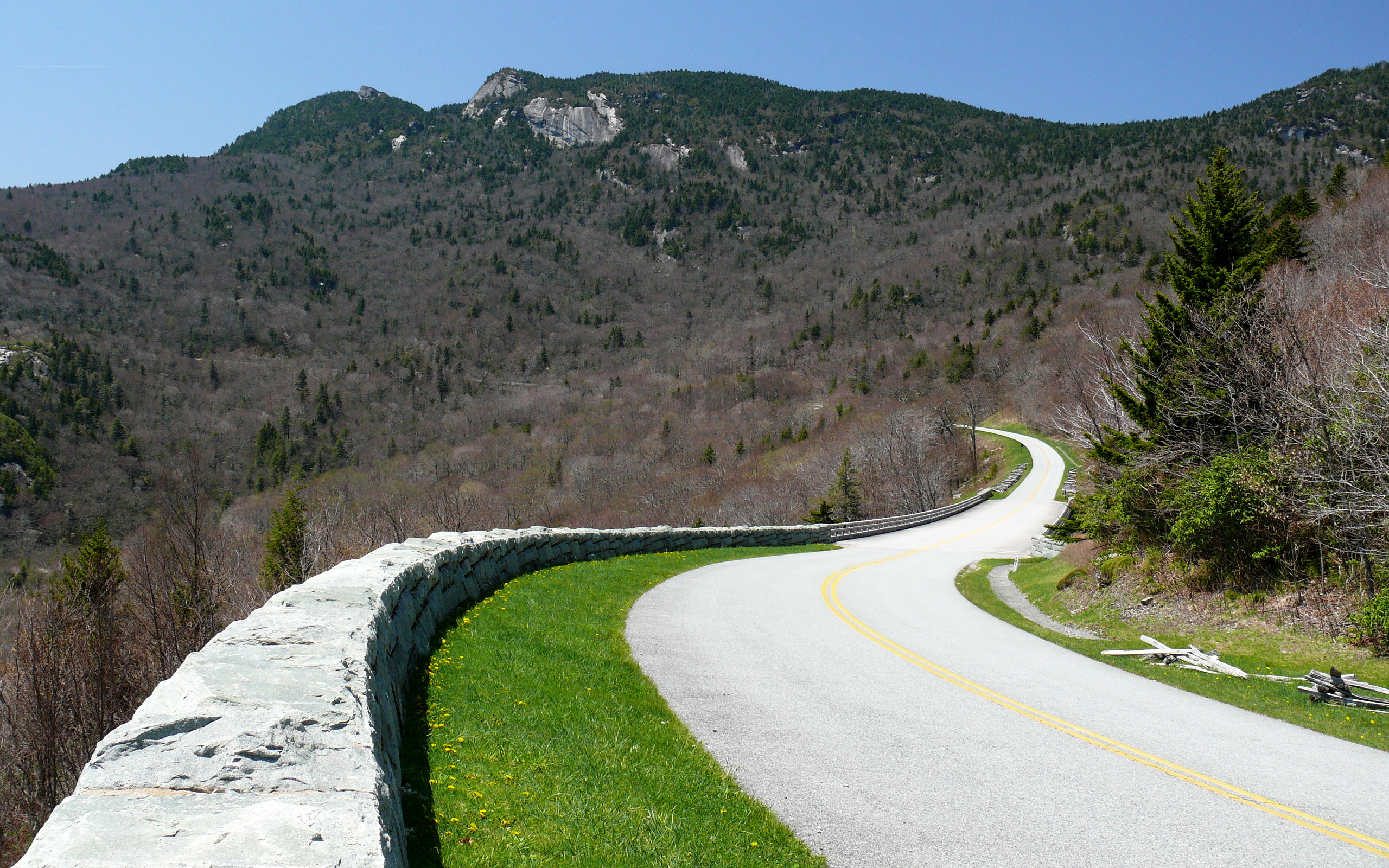
The Blue Ridge Parkway heading towards Grandfather Mountain in North Carolina

The Deep South is generally associated historically with cotton production. By 1850, the term "Cotton States" was in common use, and the differences between the Deep South (lower) and Upland South (upper) were recognized. A key difference was the Deep South's plantation-style cash crop agriculture (mainly cotton, rice and sugar), using African American slaves working large farms while plantation owners tended to live in towns and cities. This system of plantation farming was originally developed in the West Indies and introduced to the United States in South Carolina and Louisiana, from where it spread throughout the Deep South, although there were local exceptions wherever conditions did not support the system. The sharp division between town and country, the intensive use of a few cash crops, and the high proportion of slaves, all differed from the Upland South.

Virginia and the surrounding Tidewater region stand out as different from both the Upland South and the Deep South. Its history of slavery predates the West Indian plantation model, relying on tobacco as a cash crop from the start. Tidewater had few urban centers, instead establishing multiple markets along tributaries. Cotton and rice operations were large and factory-like, while tobacco profits hinged on skilled, careful, and efficient labor units.

In addition, the Cotton Belt of the Deep South was controlled by Indians (mainly the Five Civilized Tribes of the Cherokee, Creek (Muscogee), Chickasaw, Choctaw, and Seminole) who were powerful enough to keep pioneering settlers from moving into the region. The Deep South's cotton boom did not occur until after the Indians were forced west in the early 19th century. In contrast, the Upland South, Kentucky, and Tennessee especially, were the scene of Indian resistance and pioneering settlement during the late 18th century. Thus the Upland South colonized earlier and had established its particular settlement patterns before most of the Deep South was opened to general colonization.

The differences between the Upland South and lowlands of the Southern Atlantic Seaboard and Cotton Belt, often resulted in regional tension and conflict within states. For example, during the late 18th century, the upland "backcountry" of North Carolina grew in population until the Upland Southerners there outnumbered the older, well-established, wealthier coastal populations. In some cases, the conflict between the two resulted in warfare, such as War of the Regulation in North Carolina. Later, similar processes resulted in divergent populations in states to the west. Northern Alabama, for example, was settled by Upland Southerners from Tennessee, while southern Alabama was one of the core regions of the Deep South cotton boom.

The two regions also differ physically. The Upland South is dominated by deciduous hardwood forest, in contrast to the Deep South's predominantly evergreen pine forests. The Upland South is often much hillier than the Deep South, due to the Deep South being part of the coastal plain.

=== Industrial history ===
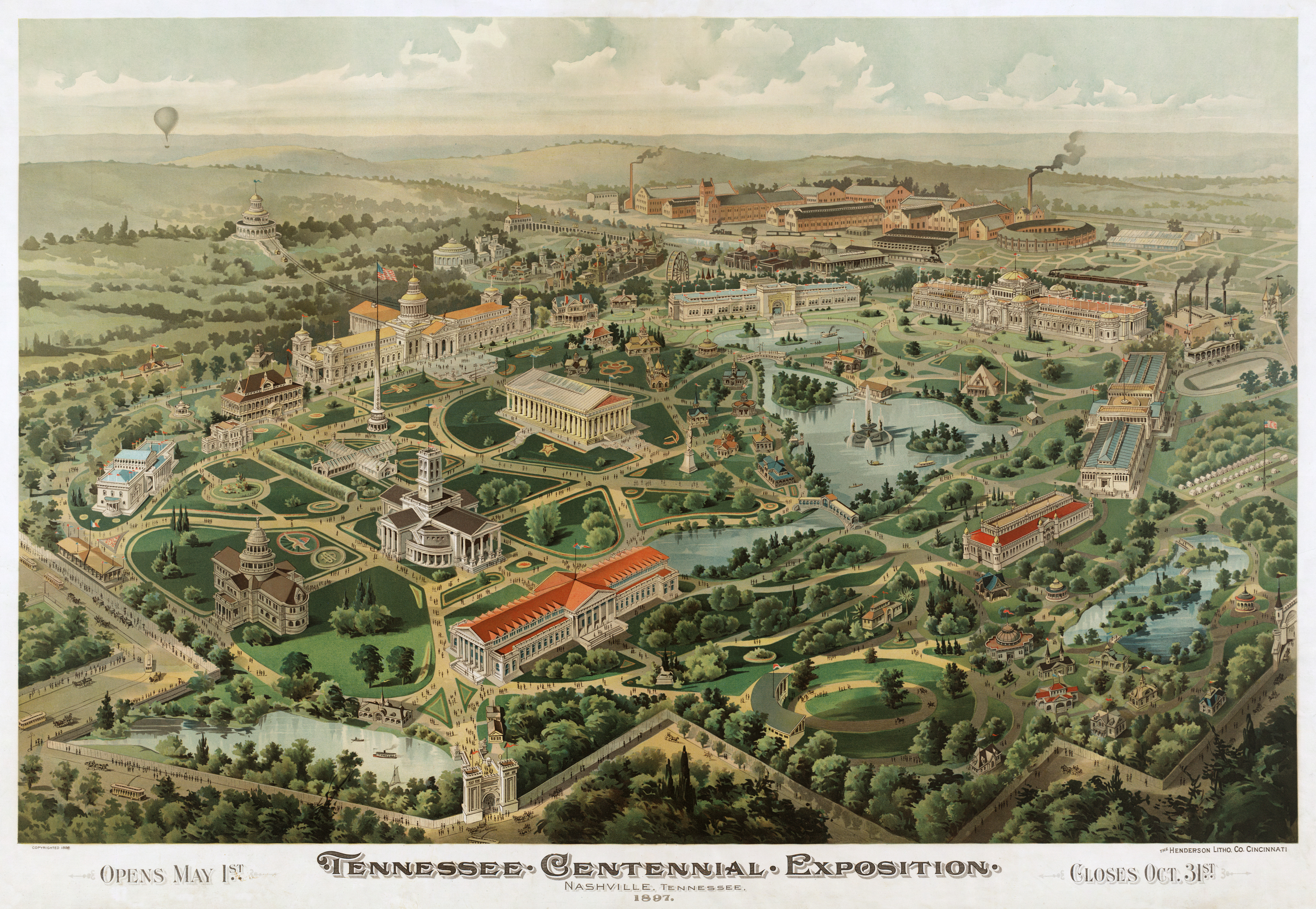
Tennessee Centennial Exposition in Nashville (1897)

The Upland South contains its own sub-regions. The fertile lowlands of the Nashville Basin and the Bluegrass Basin gave rise to the cities of Nashville, Lexington, and Louisville, which grew into banking and mercantile centers during the late 19th century, home to an elite class of Upland Southerners, including bankers, lawyers, educators, and politicians. Most of the Upland South, however, remained rural in character.

Although historically very rural, the Upland South was one of the nation's early industrial regions and continues to be today. Mining of coal, iron, copper, and other minerals has been part of the region's economy since the 18th century. As early as 1750, lead and zinc were mined in Wythe County, Virginia, and copper was mined and smelted in Polk County, Tennessee. Two major Appalachian goldfields were developed, the first in western North Carolina beginning in 1799. By 1825, Rutherford County, North Carolina, was the center of the nation's most extensive gold mining. In 1828, a much richer Gold Strike was made in North Georgia, mostly within what was then the territory of the Cherokee Nation. The mining camp of Dahlonega boomed during the ensuing Georgia Gold Rush. Iron foundries in Virginia and early coal mining operations in central Appalachia date to before 1850.

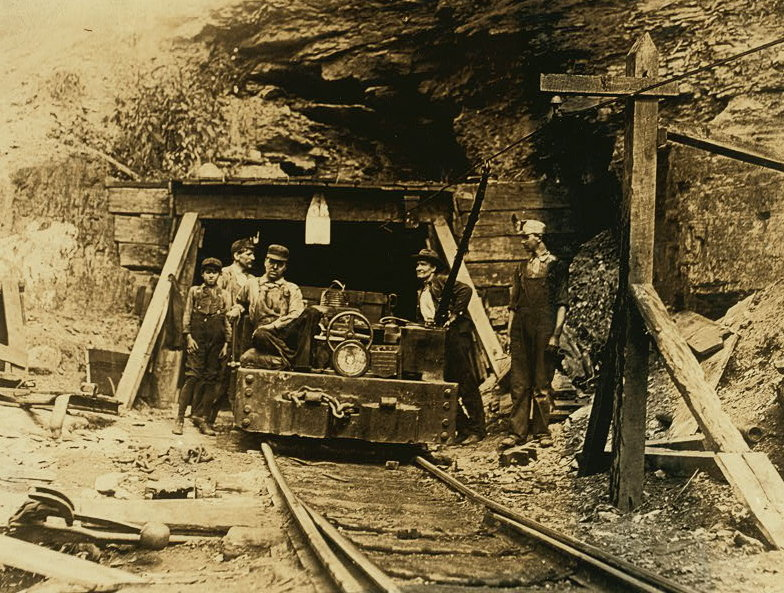
West Virginia coal mine (1908)

The abundance of iron ore, coal, and limestone in the mountains and hills of the Birmingham District transformed a gritty boom town into the iron and steel city of Birmingham. Birmingham would soon be known as the Pittsburgh of the South, as it became the leading industrial and transportation hub of the south during the early 20th century. Some of these early furnaces and forges were fueled with nearby deposits of bituminous coal. This robust economy gave the city a tough blue collar culture of hardened iron workers, miners, and steel workers as well as a cosmopolitan class of bankers, lawyers, educators and politicians. Similar examples of early urban-industrial areas include Embree's Iron Works in East Tennessee (1808), the Red River iron region of Estill County, Kentucky (1806–1808), and the Jackson Iron Works near Morgantown, West Virginia (1830). Wheeling, West Virginia was known as "Nail City" in the 1840s and 1850s. By 1860, Tennessee was the third-largest iron-producing state in the nation, after Pennsylvania and New York. The scale of mining, especially coal mining, increased dramatically after 1870. The importance of mining and metallurgy can be seen in the many towns with names such as Pigeon Forge and Bloomery (a bloomery being a type of smelting furnace), scattered across the Upland South.

Logging has also been an important part of the Upland South's economy. The region became the United States' primary source of timber after railroads allowed large-scale industrial logging in the late 19th and early 20th centuries. Today, the historic importance of the Upland South's forests can be seen in its many national forests, such as Cherokee National Forest in Tennessee, Nantahala National Forest in North Carolina, and Daniel Boone National Forest in Kentucky, among many others. The Upland South's terrain and forests, as well as history and culture, occur in parts of states usually associated with the Midwest and Deep South. These areas are often associated with national forests. For example Mark Twain National Forest in southern Missouri, Shawnee National Forest in southern Illinois, Hoosier National Forest in southern Indiana, Wayne National Forest in southeast Ohio, William B. Bankhead National Forest in northern Alabama, Chattahoochee-Oconee National Forest in northern Georgia, Sumter National Forest in South Carolina, and Ouachita National Forest in Arkansas and Oklahoma.

Textile mills and industry served as an important factor in the Upland South's economy from the late through the mid-20th century. Today the Upland South contains a diversity of people and economies. Some parts, like the Shenandoah Valley, are famous for their rural qualities, while other parts, like the Tennessee Valley, are heavily industrialized. Knoxville and Huntsville both serve as centers of industry and scientific research.

== Culture ==
2000 Census Population Ancestry Map; the Upland South is associated with American ancestry.

The Upper South today remains a distinct culture region, with distinct ancestry, dialect, cuisine, and other characteristics. The heavily rhotacized Upland Southern dialect, still predominates in much of West Virginia, Kentucky, Tennessee, and portions of North Carolina, Virginia, Maryland, and Missouri. Noticeable influence can even be found in parts of the Lower South, such as northern Georgia and northern Alabama. Cities as far north as Cincinnati carry noticeable dialect influence as well.

As a result of the difference in the use of slaves, the boundary between the Upland South and Deep South can still be seen today on maps showing the population percentage of African-Americans. The term Black Belt originally referred to a region of black soil in Alabama that was especially fertile for cotton farming and has a high percentage of African-Americans.

In contrast, the Upland South was less involved with large-scale slavery, and was settled by Northern English, Scots lowlanders and Ulster-Scots (later called the Scotch-Irish) who initially settled in Appalachia and later the entire Upland South in the mid to late 18th century.

Similar to the Deep South, the region is part of the Bible Belt and heavily evangelical Protestant, with Baptists making up a plurality in the vast majority of counties. The cuisine of the Upper South is generally closely related to the south as a whole, excluding southern low-country coastal areas in which the cuisine tends to involve seafood and rice dishes, which are not common in the Upper South.

=== Politics ===
During the American Civil War some areas of the Upland South were noted for their resistance to the Confederacy. East Tennessee Republican leanings are rooted in its antebellum Whig sentiments. Historian O.P. Temple traces this sentiment back to the anti-aristocratic Covenanters of Scotland.

The uplands of western Virginia became the state of West Virginia as a result, though half the counties of the new state were still secessionist, and partisan warfare continued throughout the war. Kentucky and Missouri for the most part remained in the Union, though they were both claimed by the Confederacy and had dual competing Confederate governments in the form of the Confederate government of Kentucky and the Confederate government of Missouri, and were torn by internal strife. The Confederacy controlled more than half of Kentucky and the southern portion of Missouri early in the war but largely lost control of both states after 1862. The southern Appalachian regions of East Tennessee, Western North Carolina, Northern Alabama, and Northern Georgia, were widely noted for their pro-Union sentiments.

Most of the states with territory in the Upland South became part of the Solid South and enacted racial segregation laws after the American Civil War, with the exception of the Midwestern states of Illinois, Indiana, and Ohio; these three Midwestern states had abolished slavery before the American Civil War.

The Upland South voted for Democratic presidents into the 1990s, being won by Lyndon B. Johnson in 1964, Jimmy Carter in 1976, and Bill Clinton in 1992 and 1996. However, the Upland South has rapidly swung towards the Republican Party in the 21st century, with both Barack Obama and Joe Biden winning few Southern States (in 2008 and 2012) along with Biden in 2020. Biden also lost ground in Missouri, Indiana, and Ohio in 2020 compared to Obama.

== See also ==
- Albion's Seed
- Appalachia
- Appalachian English
- Appalachian music
- Bluegrass music
- Border states
- Butternut (people)
- Hillbilly Highway
- Mid-Atlantic
- Moonshine
- Mountain whites
- Old South
- Pennsyltucky
- Rum-running (bootlegging)
- South Atlantic
- Southern American English
- Southwest Territory
- Urban Appalachians
- Wilderness Road

== Bibliography ==
- Drake, Richard B. A History of Appalachia. Lexington: University of Kentucky Press, 2001. ISBN 0-8131-2169-8.
- Jordan-Bychkov, Terry G. The Upland South: The Making of an American Folk Region and Landscape. Harrisonburg: U of Virginia P, 2003. ISBN 1-930066-08-2.
- McWhiney, Grady (1988). Cracker Culture: Celtic Ways in the Old South. University of Alabama Press. ISBN 0817303286.
- Meinig, D. W. The Shaping of America: A Geographical Perspective on 500 Years of History, Volume 1: Atlantic America, 1492–1800. New Haven: Yale University Press: 1986. ISBN 0-300-03882-8.
- Meinig, D. W. The Shaping of America: A Geographical Perspective on 500 Years of History, Volume 2: Continental America, 1800–1867. New Haven: Yale University Press, 1993. ISBN 0-300-05658-3.
- Meinig, D. W. The Shaping of America: A Geographical Perspective on 500 Years of History, Volume 3: Transcontinental America, 1850–1915. New Haven: Yale University Press, 1998. ISBN 0-300-08290-8.
- Meinig, D. W. The Shaping of America: A Geographical Perspective on 500 Years of History, Volume 4: Global America, 1915–2000. New Haven: Yale University Press, 2004. ISBN 0-300-10432-4.
- Williams, John Alexander. Appalachia: A History. Charlotte: University of North Carolina Press, 2002. ISBN 0-8078-5368-2.
- Zelinsky, Wilbur. The Cultural Geography of the United States. Upper Saddle River: Prentice-Hall, 1973.
