= Reckless (1984 film) =

1984 love story directed by James Foley

- Theatrical release poster
- Directed by: James Foley
- Written by: Chris Columbus
- Produced by: Scott Rudin; Edgar J. Scherick
- Starring: Aidan Quinn; Daryl Hannah; Kenneth McMillan; Cliff DeYoung
- Cinematography: Michael Ballhaus
- Edited by: Albert Magnoli
- Music by: Thomas Newman
- Production company: Metro-Goldwyn-Mayer
- Distributed by: MGM/UA Entertainment Co.
- Release date: February 3, 1984
- Running time: 90 minutes
- Country: United States
- Language: English
- Budget: $4 million
- Box office: $8.3 million

Reckless is a 1984 American romantic drama film starring Aidan Quinn and Daryl Hannah. The film was directed by James Foley and written by Chris Columbus, in their directing and screenwriting debuts respectively. The film's soundtrack included music by Kim Wilde, INXS, Romeo Void, Bob Seger and Thomas Newman.

== Plot ==
Teenage outcast and football player Johnny Rourke falls for upper-class cheerleader Tracey Prescott. She is officially dating his teammate Randy Daniels. A random draw at the high school 'Tin Can-Can' dance pairs Johnny and Tracey.

Worlds collide and opposites attract as they connect on the dance floor. Jealous Randy picks a fight with Johnny, the coach Phil Barton intervenes, and Johnny leaves in a huff. Tracey follows, and he offers to take her out on his motorbike. He shows her his lookout spot, and they talk about their future plans.

The next day at school Johnny gets a call from the mill, as his dad John Sr. is too drunk to work. It causes him to be late to practice, so Coach Barton berates him. When he does not divulge why, he is kicked off the team. Arriving home in a belligerent mood, he argues with John Sr., who smashes his stereo and throws him out.

At home, Tracey talks to her mom, lamenting that she is considered to be the perfect daughter. She tears out of her driveway and down the road. Johnny detects her inquietude, follows closely, then he gets her to stop. They sneak into the high school. Reading his file identifying him as anti-social and potentially dangerous since his mother's abandonment, Johnny and Tracey go on a rampage. They strew file contents throughout the halls, freeing the animals and creatures in the biology classroom, smash trophy cases, strip and jump into the pool, where he kisses her, and they later sleep together.

Johnny wakes up alone, so he seeks Tracey out at her house, as she is meant to be alone for the weekend. He pushes his way in, and although she weakly resists at first, she caves in. They are woken up in her parents' room by her younger brother Davey, who explains her family came back early. He helps sneak Johnny out.

At the pep rally that night, Johnny asks to speak to Tracey. She arrives very late to his look out. He reiterates how he needs to leave, unintentionally scaring her. For a few days she avoids him at school. He gets called into the factory again, but this time to clear out John Sr.'s locker after his death.

After the funeral, which Tracey attends from afar, Johnny tries to go through John Sr.'s things. Finding keepsakes of his mother who abandoned them, he sets fire to them and the whole place. Hopes dashed, future prospects dim and the omnipresent steel mill looming large in the background of this one-industry town, Johnny comes to grips with his estranged mother and recently deceased father. Johnny turns up to the career fair, wanting to speak alone with Tracey. She is forced to decide between her stable longtime boyfriend Randy and Johnny. Johnny declares his love for her, and they drive off together on his motorcycle to Davey's cheers.

== Cast ==
- Aidan Quinn as Johnny Rourke
- Daryl Hannah as Tracey Prescott
- Kenneth McMillan as John Rourke, Sr.
- Cliff DeYoung as Phil Barton
- Lois Smith as Mrs. Prescott
- Adam Baldwin as Randy Daniels
- Dan Hedaya as Peter Daniels
- Billy Jayne as David Prescott (as Billy Jacoby)
- Toni Kalem as Donna
- Jennifer Grey as Cathy Bennario
- Haviland Morris as Mary Pat Sykes
- Pamela Springsteen as Karen Syber
- Susan Kingsley as Eileen
- Adam LeFevre as Officer Haskell

== Production ==
Maxwell Caulfield was offered the lead role Johnny Rourke but turned it down as he had just made Grease 2 and did not want to play another character in a film set at high school who rides a motorbike. Caulfield later regretted the decision.

It was shot in the Appalachian Mountains and Rust Belt of Steubenville, Ohio, Weirton, West Virginia and Mingo Junction, Ohio.

== Reception ==
=== Box office ===
In the United States and Canada, Reckless grossed $8.3 million at the box office.

=== Critical response ===
On the review aggregator website Rotten Tomatoes, 0% of 5 critics' reviews are positive, with an average rating of 4.3/10. Metacritic, which uses a weighted average, assigned the film a score of 52 out of 100, based on 7 critics, indicating "mixed or average" reviews.

In a review for The New York Times, Janet Maslin wrote: "That this film… works even briefly is something of a wonder. Contrived and cliched as it turns out to be, Reckless has enough vitality to carry it for a while, although it never stops recalling other films."

On a 2015 episode of the film podcast The Movie Crypt, screenwriter Chris Columbus disowned the film and claimed that director James Foley had "destroyed his material". Columbus claimed he was banned from the set by Foley, and cried after the first screening.
