= Butternut (people) =

Term for inhabitants of a region of the U.S.

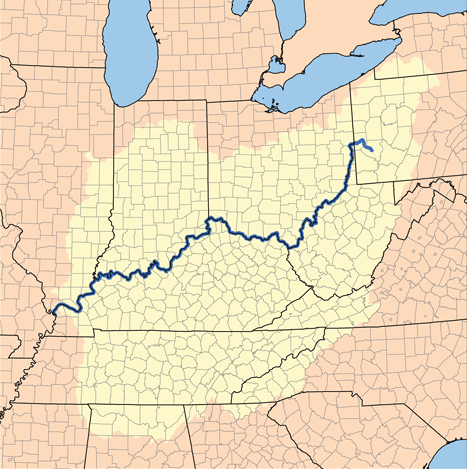
Settlers from the American South inhabited the area just north of the Ohio River in the states of Ohio, Indiana and Illinois. (Yellow area shows Ohio River watershed.)

Butternut was a term applied to inhabitants of the southern parts of Ohio, Illinois and Indiana in the early to mid-nineteenth century. Many of these settlers originated in the Southern United States, particularly Virginia, Kentucky and North Carolina. The term refers to the dye of the butternut tree, by which their clothes were colored. In the years leading up the American Civil War they generally supported pro-south and pro-slavery positions, often electing Doughface politicians. Their settlements hugged much of the border between free and slave states along the Ohio River.

== Background ==
The Northwest Ordinance banned slavery in much of the western territories acquired by the United States at the Treaty of Paris, settlers pouring into these territories. Although northern states still practiced slavery at the time of the American Revolution, emancipation rapidly increased in these regions while slavery consolidated in the south. As the western territories were opened to settlement, most of the earliest settlers came from the south, using the easier access provided by the Ohio River. Many were of Scots-Irish background. Not all of these newcomers supported slavery. Those who did not included Thomas Lincoln, who immigrated from Kentucky to Indiana in 1816, bringing his young son Abraham Lincoln with him.

The governor of the Indiana Territory, William Henry Harrison, who was originally from Virginia, led unsuccessful efforts to suspend the prohibition of slavery in the territory. In spite of this, some slaves were brought into the region under the pretext that they were indentured servants. In 1824 an attempt to rewrite the Constitution of Illinois to legalize slavery was only defeated by 6,600 votes to 5,000.

== Demographics ==
Overwhelmingly rural, the Butternuts generally grew corn and raised pigs which many had done in their old homes in the east. Whiskey was their staple drink. Clustered along the Ohio valley, they tended to ship their produce to riverports such as Cincinnati. By contrast a growing number of settlers moved in from New England to populate the northern part of the three states, increasing sharply with the construction of the Erie Canal. In contrast to the Butternuts, these Yankees grew wheat and raised cattle and sheep. While the northern areas were heavily Congregationalist and Presbyterian, the Butternuts were predominantly Baptists. Butternut areas overwhelmingly supported the Democratic Party, while Yankee-settled areas backed the Whigs and later the Republicans.

At the 1850 Census large proportions of the three states originated from Kentucky, while 152,278 had been born in Virginia. In addition to their children living in the states, this formed a significant chunk of the population. Although not one of the Butternut states, many inhabitants of Iowa may have moved there from the region before the Civil War explaining their general hostility to African Americans. Kansas was also a popular destination for these settlers. By this time the mass emigration of settlers from New England and New York had dramatically altered the balance in the three states, likely prompting many of the Butternuts to move further west.

== Civil war era ==
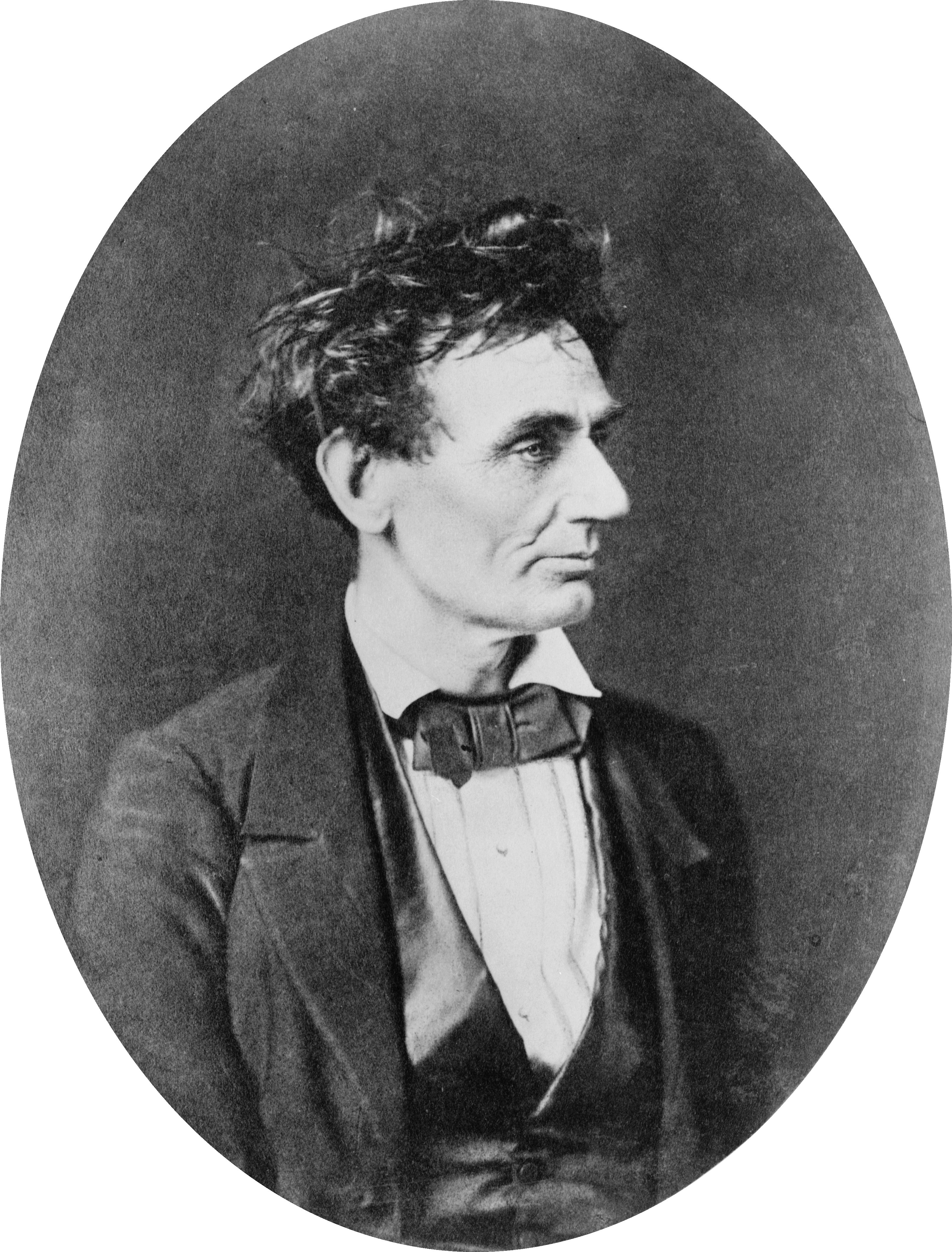
Although from a Butternut background, Abraham Lincoln inherited his father's antislavery views.

Due to economic pressure from northern immigrants, a number of Butternuts spread westwards into the newly opened states of Kansas and Iowa. During the American Civil War, many Butternuts adopted an ambiguous position. Hostile to the antislavery views of the Republican Party, they provided a solid block vote for George B. McClellan in the 1864 election.

== See also ==
- Pennsyltucky
- Urban Appalachians
- Upland South

== Bibliography ==
- Dippel, John Van Houten. Race to the Frontier: "White Flight" and Westward Expansion. Algora Publishing, 2005.
- Howe, Daniel Walker. What Hath God Wrought: The Transformation of America, 1815–1848. Oxford University Press, 2007.
- McPherson, James M. Battle Cry of Freedom: The Civil War Era. Oxford University Press, 2003.
- Phillips, Christopher. The Rivers Ran Backward: The Civil War and the Remaking of the American Middle Border. Oxford University Press, 2016.
