= Getting Out =

Play written by Marsha Norman

- Written by: Marsha Norman
- Characters: Arlene; Arlie; Guard Evans; Bennie; Guard Caldwell; Doctor; Mother; School Principal; Ronnie; Carl; Warden; Ruby
- Original language: English
- Genre: Drama
- Setting: Apartment in a run-down section of downtown Louisville, Kentucky; present day

Premiere
- Date premiered: October 19, 1978
- Place premiered: Marymount Manhattan Theatre; New York City

Getting Out is a play by Marsha Norman. The play was produced at the Marymount Manhattan Theatre in October 1978 and then Off-Broadway in May 1979. The play concerns a female prisoner just released from prison, who returns to her home in Kentucky. Although she tries to have a normal life, her past experiences keep intruding.

== Production history ==
Getting Out, a play by Marsha Norman, was presented by the Phoenix Theatre at the Marymount Manhattan Theatre from October 19, 1978, to November 5, 1978. It was then produced by Lester Osterman, Lucille Lortel, and Marc Howard at the Off-Broadway Theatre de Lys, opening on May 15, 1979, and running to December 9, 1979. The cast:

- Arlene - Susan Kingsley
- Arlie - Pamela Reed
- Guard Evans - John C. Capodice
- Bennie - Bob Burrus
- Guard Caldwell - Fritz Sperberg
- Doctor - William Jay
- Mother - Madeleine Thornton-Sherwood
- School Principal - Anna Minot
- Ronnie - Kevin Bacon
- Carl - Leo Burmester
- Warden - Hansford Rowe
- Ruby - Joan Pape

The creatives:

- Directed by: Jon Jory
- Associated producers: Spencer H. Berlin and Marilyn R. Strauss
- Scenery/Lighting: James Tilton
- Costumes: Kurt Wilhelm

Other Productions

The world premiere was held at the Humana Festival at the Actors Theatre of Louisville, Kentucky on November 2, 1977. The West Coast premiere was produced by the Center Theatre Group of Los Angeles at the Mark Taper Forum.

== Setting and original performance conditions ==
"Both acts are set in a dingy one-room apartment in a rundown section of downtown Louisville, Kentucky. There is a sink, an apartment-size combination stove and refrigerator, and a counter with cabinets above. Dirty curtains conceal the bars on the outside of the single window. There is one closet and a door to the bathroom. The door to the apartment opens into a hall."

"A catwalk stretches above the apartment and a prison cell, Stage Right, connects it by the stairways. An apron Downstage and Stage Left completes the enclosure of the apartment in playing areas for the past. The apartment must seem imprisoned." (Dramatists Plays Service Inc.)

== Synopsis ==
"Released from prison Arlene returns to a run-down apartment in Louisville, intent on starting her life over. Rebellious and disruptive as a young girl, she has found strength in religion and wants to put her youth (as Arlie) behind her. But her struggles to find her way in the present (as Arlene) is counterpointed by flashbacks of her past (as Arlie), her two personalities being represented by two performers, who sometimes appear onstage simultaneously. We meet the guards and prison officials with whom Arlie waged a running battle; and the unfeeling, slatternly mother, the lecherous former prison guard, the pimp ex-boyfriend, and the touchingly friendly neighbor with whom Arlene is confronted in the present. Ultimately, the play, like life, offers no simple answers---but it conveys, with heart-rending honesty and compassion, the struggle of someone fighting for her life against incredible odds" (Dramatists Play Service Inc.)

== Character summaries ==
- Arlene: a thin, drawn woman in her late twenties, who has just served an 8-year prison term for murder
- Arlie: Arlene at various times in her life
- Bennie: an Alabama prison guard in his 50s
- Evans: a prison guard
- Doctor: a psychiatrist in a juvenile institution
- Caldwell: another prison guard
- Mother: Arlene's mother
- School Principal
- Ronnie: a teenager in a juvenile institution
- Carl: Arlene's former pimp and partner in various crimes; in his late 20s
- Warden: Superintendent of Pine Ridge Correctional Institute for Women
- Ruby: Arlene's upstairs neighbor; a cook in a local diner; also an ex-con, in her late 30s

== Text ==
- Getting Out, A Play in Two Acts (Dramatists Play Service)

== Awards and recognition ==
Marsha Norman won the 1979 Outer Critics Circle John Glassner Award, and Susan Kingsley won the Outer Critics Circle Award for Best New Talent.

The play was a 1979 Selection, The Burns Mantle Theater Yearbook, The Best Plays of 1978-1979
