= North Corktown, Detroit =

Human settlement in Detroit, Michigan, United States of America

North Corktown
- Neighborhood of Detroit
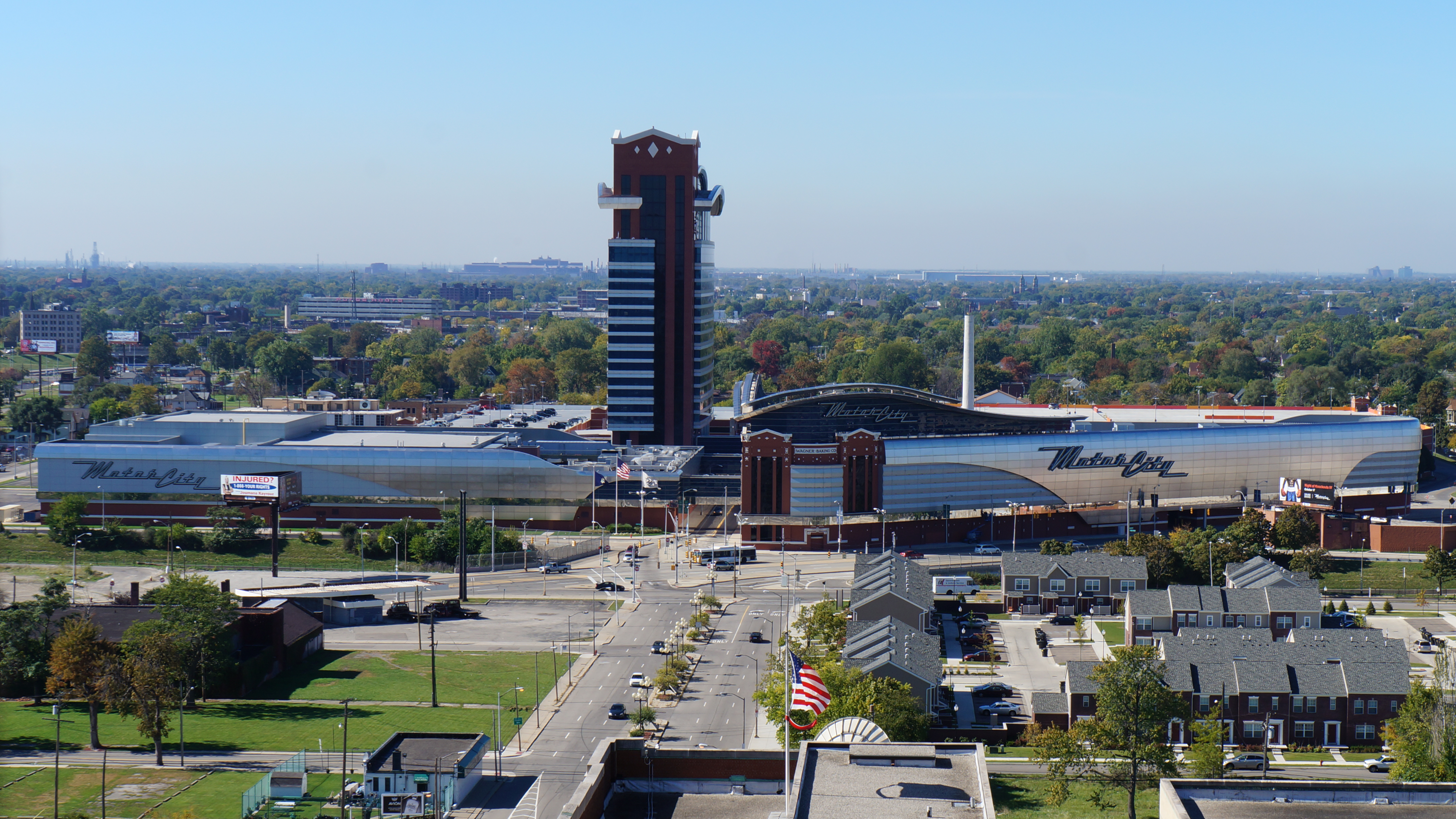
- Motor City Casino in North Corktown

- Location within the city of Detroit North Corktown (Michigan)
- Coordinates: 42°20′14″N 83°04′31″W
- Country: United States
- State: Michigan
- County: Wayne County
- City: Detroit

North Corktown (also known as Briggs) is a neighborhood located in Detroit, Michigan, bounded roughly by I-75 on the south, Martin Luther King Jr Boulevard on the north, I-96 on the west, and the John C. Lodge Freeway on the east.

North Corktown was originally part of the Corktown neighborhood. This changed with the construction of I-75, which severed Corktown into two separate neighborhoods.

== History ==
North Corktown came into existence after the construction of I-75. Before this period North Corktown was part of the Corktown neighborhood. The name Corktown comes from the neighborhoods early residents. In the 1830s Irish Immigrants from County Cork began living in the area that is today Corktown and North Corktown. The early residents built many Queen Anne style homes as well as row houses on relatively narrow lots. In the 1960s the neighborhood began to steadily decline, largely due to freeway construction and urban renewal projects.

During the 1990s Briggs had a much higher rate of poverty and a higher percentage of white residents than most of Detroit. A high portion of the white residents in Briggs were either from Appalachia or had family roots there.

== Redevelopment ==
Since the 1990s the neighborhood has seen increased investment. Older homes have been restored, and new housing has been constructed throughout the neighborhood. In 2007 the MotorCity Casino and hotel resort was completed in North Corktown. This has brought much attention to the neighborhood as well as jobs, retail, restaurants, and tourists. Also, Hostel Detroit, opened its doors to travelers in Spring 2011. It is located on Vermont Street.

Developers have set their sights on North Corktown due to its proximity to Corktown, Downtown, and Midtown. Since 2019, there has been increased townhome development in the neighborhood with multiple projects having been completed and currently underway.

== See also ==
- Corktown
