= The Dollmaker (novel) =

1954 novel by Harriette Simpson Arnow

- Cover of the first edition, 1954
- Author: Harriette Simpson Arnow
- Language: English
- Publisher: The Macmillan Company
- Publication date: 1954
- Publication place: United States

The Dollmaker is a novel by Harriette Arnow. It is the story of Gertie Nevels and her family's migration from their Kentucky homeland to industrial Detroit during World War II. First published in 1954, the novel earned a 1955 nomination for the National Book Award. Its New York Times book reviewer called it a superb novel, notable for its strength and the glowing richness of character and scene. In 1971, Joyce Carol Oates characterized this novel as "our most unpretentious American masterpiece".

== Plot ==
As the book begins, Gertie Nevels, a Kentucky mountain woman, is struggling to take her sick child down the mountain to see a doctor. She is able to reach the road on the family mule and then to stop a passing car and convince its reluctant occupants to drive her to the doctor's office. Because her son is in imminent danger of death from suffocation, Gertie performs an emergency tracheotomy. They go to the doctor's office where the boy recovers.

During the next part of the book, we get a glimpse of Gertie's life in the mountains, where she is close to her husband Clovis, her five children, her parents, and the community. She is very much at home and fulfilled in this environment, surrounded by nature and connected with the people she loves. She is extremely competent in this mountain life. She thoroughly knows the Bible. Among her many talents is a particular gift for whittling, which she uses to make practical items like ax handles and creative work like dolls. She is gradually carving a sculpture out of a large block of cherry wood, although she does not know if the figure that will eventually emerge will be Christ or Judas.

Her dream is to buy the old Tipton place for the family so they will have a better home and can farm for themselves rather than as sharecroppers, but the war is intruding on this peaceful life. Men from the community are fighting overseas, Gertie's brother has just been killed in the war, and Clovis's coal delivery business is suffering. Then Clovis is called into the military induction center. Not drafted, Clovis goes instead to Detroit to do war work in the factories.

Unbeknownst to Clovis, after years of careful saving and with some money inherited from her brother, Gertie buys the Tipton place and begins to move the family into their new home. But word soon reaches her that Clovis is expecting them to join him in Detroit. Under pressure from her mother, Gertie is convinced to give up the Tipton place. She gets her money back and prepares to go with her children to Detroit to join Clovis, who knew nothing about the home purchase. Giving up her dream of the home is a heartbreaking loss for Gertie, but at least she expects life will be better for her children in Detroit.

When they arrive in Detroit, however, they find that life is in many ways worse for them. The wartime housing project apartment is small and the neighborhood industrial. The schools are bad, and the winter is hard, the food poor. Money is short and the family must often borrow to buy necessities. There is not always enough food to feed the family. She begins to waver in her Christian faith. Clovis's work can be unsteady. Gertie develops some new friends among the other women in the housing project, and she finds that she is able to sell her carvings which helps them get by. Later, Gertie reluctantly lets Clovis convince her to use an electric saw to make the dolls to increase her sales, even though these machine-made dolls are ugly compared to her beautiful hand-carved dolls.

Although their new life is in many ways unpleasant, Gertie and Clovis do their best to adapt. They are completely out of place in this setting, though, and the family begins to suffer more and more serious problems. First, her oldest boy runs away to return to the mountains. Then, her beloved daughter Cassie, a sensitive child who simply cannot adapt to the new life, is killed by a train in an accident indirectly caused by Gertie's well-meaning but misguided efforts to try to help Cassie fit in. Then, her husband is increasingly drawn into union battles—first as a victim, and eventually as a perpetrator of serious strike-related violence.

At last, Gertie sacrifices the large wooden sculpture she has been working on throughout the book. At a moment of particular financial distress, she cuts up the sculpture for wood to make dolls for sale to help support her family.

== Style ==
The style of this novel has been characterized as Social Realism for its realistic depictions of working class life.

== Background ==
In a 1983 interview, Arnow said she got to know many back hills women while teaching in a one-room Kentucky school. Later, Arnow moved to a housing project in Detroit. This was during the Appalachian migration, which saw huge numbers of mountain people moving north to work in war-related, automobile manufacturing, and other industries. However, in this interview, Arnow stressed that The Dollmaker story was in no way autobiographical. Rather, she said the story was created in her imagination.

== Adaptations ==
=== 1984 film ===
The Dollmaker is a 1984 American made-for-television drama film starring Jane Fonda and based on the novel.

== External sources ==
- Harriette Arnow (October 12, 2010). The Dollmaker. Simon and Schuster. ISBN 978-1-4391-6451-8.
- Hobbs Hesler, Jody (December 14, 2014). "Past Perfect Review: The Dollmaker". Buffalo Almanack: American Fictions and Photographic Digest. Denver, Colorado.
