= Urban Appalachian Council =

The Urban Appalachian Council (UAC) is an organization that works for a decent quality of life for Appalachian migrants and their descendants in the Greater Cincinnati area, and to concentrate on and serve as a fellowship of those acting upon their issues and concerns. The UAC strives to promote positive images of urban Appalachian people and their heritage and to dispel negative stereotypes. The council's goals are the empowerment of individuals within urban Appalachian communities in order to strengthen families, develop resources within communities, and reform the systems that impact their lives.

== History ==
During the 1960s efforts to do advocacy and organizing work with urban Appalachians emerged in several midwestern cities, notably Cincinnati. Initial efforts there began with the work of Ernie Mynatt, and the staff and volunteers of the Cincinnati Mayor's Friendly Relations Committee (now the Cincinnati Human Relations Commission). These efforts converged in 1974 with the founding of the Urban Appalachian Council with Michael Maloney as its first director.

A leading advocate for urban Appalachians at the time was Dr. Frank Foster of Xavier University. Foster organized two successive conferences at Xavier in 1970 and 1971 which helped urban Appalachian leaders develop an agenda for action. This agenda, which the Urban Appalachian Council was formed to implement, included

- organizing a consortium of scholars to conduct research on the health, education, and employment status of urban Appalachians. Today, the UAC Research Committee continues to document the needs and accomplishments of urban Appalachians through the publication of working papers, books, and scholarly articles;
- operating direct service programs in Appalachian neighborhoods (see Programs below);
- providing direct support to a network of community-based programs through local and national service volunteers, grant writing and sharing, and bookkeeping services;
- organizing conferences and workshops to assist educators, social workers, health care providers, and other professionals to work effectively with urban Appalachians;
- advocating with schools, local government, and other institutions for programs and policies that benefit low-income urban Appalachians; and
- presenting Appalachian arts, music, and other cultural programming in community settings as well as in local arts and performance venues.

== Programs ==
The council's programs are focused on education, leadership development, access to human services, employment and training (particularly for youth), and Appalachian culture and identity. Partnering with local community groups, the council has helped establish and maintain adult literacy programs in heavily Appalachian neighborhoods. Leadership development occurs through an operating philosophy that is community-based, personal, non-bureaucratic, and culturally sensitive. Access to human services is provided by ensuring that schools, government programs, and agencies operate in a way that is open to and inclusive of urban Appalachians. In the area of employment, the Council develops job sites in Appalachian neighborhoods, operates employment readiness programs, and works with local public and private employment efforts to provide outreach in the Appalachian community. To encourage the recognition of the Appalachian heritage in urban areas, the council offers training services for human service workers, a speaker's bureau, and operates the Frank Foster Library, one of the largest collections of its kind outside of the Appalachian region.
