= Corktown, Detroit =

- Corktown Historic District
- U.S. National Register of Historic Places
- U.S. Historic district
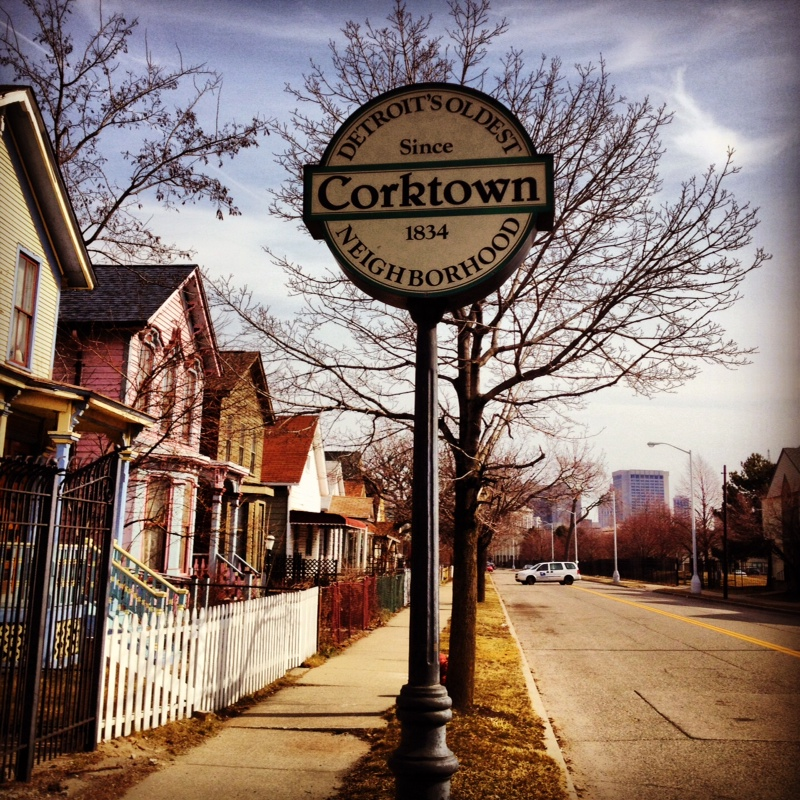
- Bagley Street in Corktown
- Interactive map
- Location: Detroit, Michigan, U.S.
- Coordinates: 42°19′50″N 83°03′50″W
- Architectural style: Colonial Revival, Late Victorian, Federal
- NRHP reference No.: 78001517
- Added to NRHP: July 31, 1978

Corktown is a neighborhood located in Detroit, Michigan. It is the oldest extant neighborhood in the city. Its boundaries include I-75 to the north, the John C. Lodge Freeway (The Lodge) to the east, Bagley and Porter streets to the south, and Rosa Parks Boulevard (12th Street) to the west. The neighborhood was listed on the National Register of Historic Places in 1978.

The Corktown Historic District is largely residential, although some commercial properties along Michigan Avenue and Trumbull Avenue are included in the district. Along with its registraion as national historic place, Corktown is designated as a City of Detroit Historic District. The neighborhood contains many newer homes and retains some original Irish businesses. Ford's 2018 acquisition of Michigan Central Station has spurred significant development and revitalization efforts in Corktown, transforming it into a burgeoning hub of innovation and urban renewal. "Corktown" is a frequent North American toponym for neightbourhoods settled by Irish immigrants.

== History ==
The Great Famine of Ireland of the 1840s resulted in extensive Irish migration to the United States and Canada. By the middle of the 19th century, they were the largest ethnic group settling in Detroit. Many of these newcomers settled on the west side of the city; they were primarily from County Cork, and thus the neighborhood came to be known as Corktown. By the early 1850s, half of the population of the 8th Ward (which contained Corktown) were of Irish descent. Historically, the neighborhood was roughly bounded by Third Street to the east, Grand River Avenue to the north, 12th Street to the west, and Jefferson Avenue/Detroit River to the south.

By the Civil War, German immigrants had begun making inroads into the Corktown neighborhood. Many immigrants had come from German provinces after the revolutions of 1848. By the turn of the century, the original Irish population had diffused through the city, and new immigrants, notably Mexican and Maltese, moved into this older housing. As the century progressed, migrants from the American South and Appalachia, both Black and white, were lured by the jobs in the automobile industry and also went to the city. By the middle of the 20th century, the area of Corktown was reduced through urban renewal schemes, the building of light industrial facilities, and the creation of the Lodge Freeway and Fisher Freeway.

== Revitalization ==
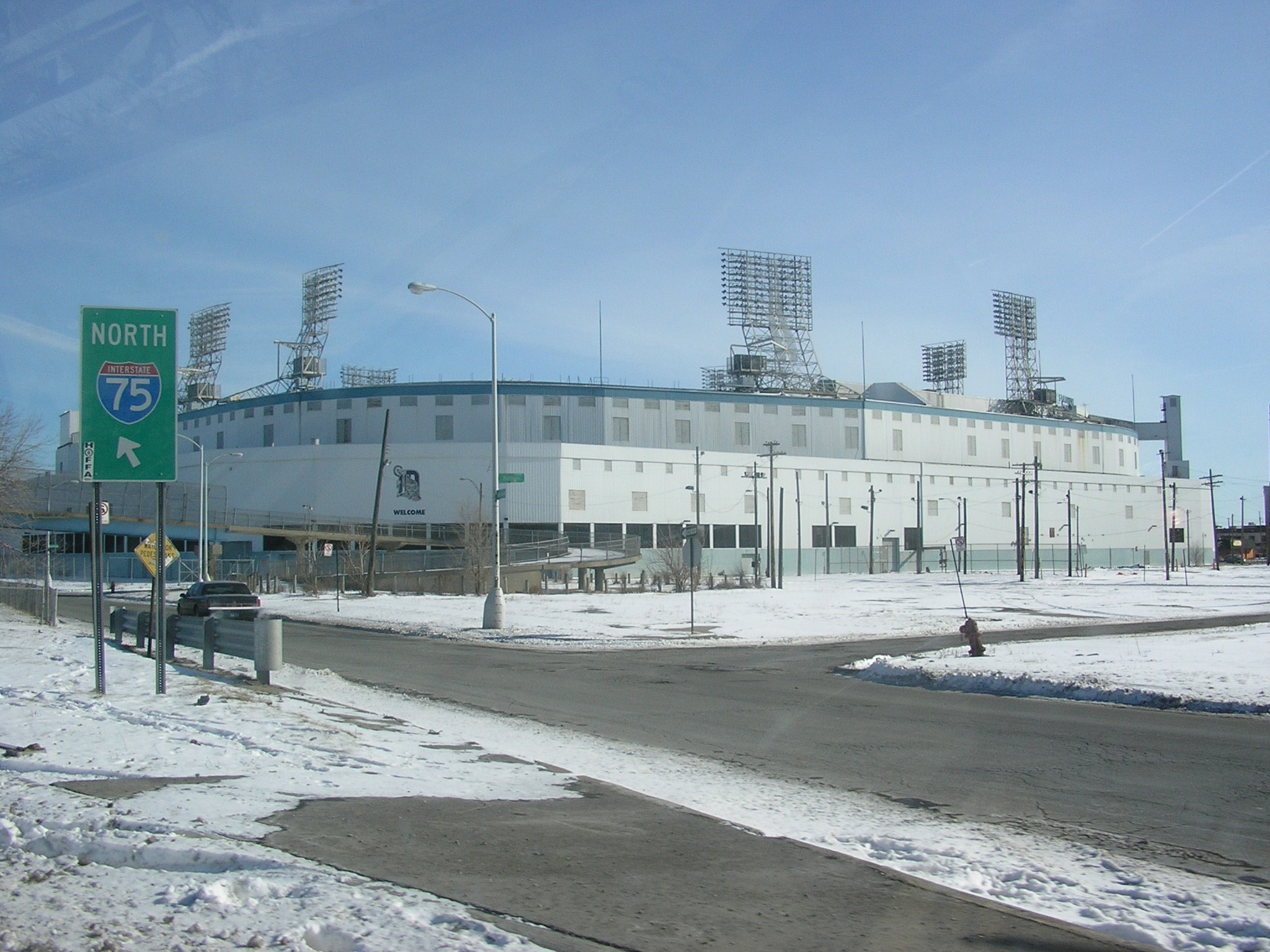
Tiger Stadium was in Corktown at the corner of Michigan Avenue and Trumbull Street until its demolition in 2009.

The UIS Irish Plaza is a park and memorial dedicated to honoring Metro Detroit's Irish immigrant community and their descendants.

Corktown has seen a number of revitalization projects since 2005. These include the United Irish Societies Irish Plaza, dedicated in 2006; the 66,000-square foot (6,100 m2) Quicken Loans Technology Center, opened in 2015; and Corner Ballpark the Detroit Police Athletic League (PAL) headquarters, and youth sports facility at the former site of Tiger Stadium, developed in 2016. Opposite the PAL facility, a $37-million mixed-use development, The Corner, with 111 apartments, and 34 townhomes for sale, broke ground in early 2018. Also in 2016, the new Trumbull & Porter boutique hotel opened after a $10 million renovation; and in 2017, Soave Enterprises broke ground on Elton Park, a multi-phase, multi-year $150 million, 420 apartment mixed-used development.

In 2024, Detroit City FC announced the acquisition of the site of the former Southwest Detroit Hospital with plans to build a new soccer-specific stadium. The goal is to have the stadium ready by the 2027 season.

=== Ford Corktown Campus ===
Built in 1913, the historic Michigan Central Station served passenger traffic until 1988, after which it was abandoned. Ford Motor Company purchased it in 2018. The building was renovated to become a mixed-use development which opened in 2024.

A major redevelopment push in the area was started by the Ford Motor Company, which began development on an urban campus in Corktown in 2017 with its purchase, renovation and occupation of The Factory building at Michigan Ave. and Rosa Parks Blvd. Ford later bought other parcels of land in Corktown, including the Michigan Central Station and the adjacent Roosevelt Warehouse. Ford plans a new $740 million Corktown campus, including 1.2 million square feet of mixed-use development spread over the Michigan Central Station, Roosevelt Warehouse, the Factory building at 1907 Michigan Avenue, and build a new mixed-use 290,000-square foot (27,000 m2), four-story building on the vacant brass factory building site, known as "The Alchemy", at 2051 Rosa Park Blvd. Ford also announced plans to build two new parking structures.

The focus of the Corktown campus will be on autonomous vehicles and electric vehicles. Ford expects to move 2,500 of its employees to the campus with space for an additional 2,500 entrepreneurs, technology companies and partners related to Ford's expansion into Autos 2.0. Ford is also seeking $104 million in tax breaks from the city as part of a $250 million incentive package over 34 years.

In 2020, Ford revealed a new site plan for its 30-acre Corktown Campus, a walkable Mobility Innovation District built around the Michigan Central Station that includes green spaces, new buildings, and community involvement.

== Architecture ==
The original buildings in Corktown are Federal-style detached homes and rowhouses built by Irish settlers. A worker's row house circa 1840 is located on Sixth Street and is one of the oldest existing structures in the city of Detroit. In later years, modestly sized Victorian townhouses with Italianate, Gothic, and Queen Anne elements were constructed in the district.

Michigan Avenue in Corktown is notable for its historic red brick pavers, which have been a defining feature of the neighborhood for decades. These bricks, originally laid in the 1890s, are a remnant of Detroit’s early efforts to improve road quality and have been preserved to maintain the area’s historic charm. Recent development plans aim to restore and reuse these historic pavers as part of the ongoing revitalization of the Michigan Avenue corridor.

== Education ==
Residents are zoned to Detroit Public Schools. Residents are zoned to Owen at Pelham and King High School.

The Roman Catholic Archdiocese of Detroit operates the Most Holy Trinity School in Corktown. It is one of the four remaining Catholic grade schools in the city.

== Notable resident ==
- Sheila Cockrel, former Detroit City Council member

== See also ==
- North Corktown
- New Center
- Midtown
- Mexicantown
