= Harriette Simpson Arnow =

American novelist

- Born: Harriette Louisa Simpson; July 7, 1908; Wayne County, Kentucky
- Died: March 22, 1986 (aged 77); Washtenaw County, Michigan
- Occupations: Writer, teacher
- Spouse: Harold Bernard Arnow
- Writing career
- Pen name: H. L. Simpson

Harriette Louisa Simpson Arnow (née Simpson; July 7, 1908 – March 22, 1986) was an American novelist and historian, who lived in Kentucky and Michigan. Arnow has been called an expert on the people of the Southern Appalachian Mountains, but she herself loved cities and spent crucial periods of her life in Cincinnati and Detroit.

== Early life and education ==
Arnow was born as Harriette Louisa Simpson in Monticello, Wayne County, Kentucky to Elias Thomas Simpson and Mary Jane "Mollie" Denny. She grew up in neighboring Pulaski County. She was one of six siblings in a family that traced its heritage to the Revolutionary War; both parents were teachers and she was raised to be a teacher. Arnow would later credit her father, Elias Thomas Simpson, and her maternal grandmother, Harriette Le Grand Foster Denney, for inspiring her desire to write with their storytelling.

She attended Berea College for two years before transferring to the University of Louisville, after which she worked for two years as a teacher and principal in rural Pulaski County, then one of the more remote areas of Appalachia. She spent time teaching at Louisville Junior High School before moving to Cincinnati in 1934. In 1935 she published her first works in Esquire, two short stories, "A Mess of Pork" and "Marigolds and Mules", under the pen name H. L. Simpson, sending a photo of her brother-in-law to disguise her gender.

== Career as writer ==
In 1936, under the name Harriette Simpson, she published her first novel, Mountain Path. While clearly drawing inspiration from her experiences as a teacher in Appalachia, Arnow pushed back against suggestions that the protagonist of the novel, Louisa Sheridan, was herself. Under the instructions of her publisher, Simpson added sensational "Appalachian" stereotypical elements (moonshining, feuds) to her original work, a much more sedate series of sketches.

From 1934 to 1939 she lived in Cincinnati and worked for the Federal Writer's Project of the WPA where she met her future husband, Harold B. Arnow, the son of Jewish immigrants, in 1939. They lived briefly in Pulaski County, Harriette again working as a teacher, before settling in a public housing complex in Detroit, Michigan in 1944.

Now billing herself as Harriette Arnow, her 1949 novel, Hunter's Horn, was a best seller and received considerable critical acclaim, finishing close to William Faulkner's A Fable in that year's voting for the Pulitzer Prize.

In 1950 the Arnows moved to 40 acres of land near Ann Arbor, Michigan. She published her most famous work The Dollmaker in 1954. This novel, about a poor Kentucky family forced by economic necessity to move to Detroit reflected her own life, but also reflects the experiences of many Appalachians who migrated from their homes for the promise of better lives in the industrialized North. Told through the eyes of Gertie Nevels, a woman torn from the woods and farmland to move with her children to join her husband living in World War II factory workers' housing in Detroit, it can be seen as a work of feminist fiction. Arnow herself disputed this characterization, however, preferring to see it as an individual woman's struggle to survive in a harsh and changing world. Of her writing she said, "I am afflicted with too many words ... Like the characters in my books, I talk too much and tell things I shouldn't tell."

Later works were published under the now-familiar byline Harriette Simpson Arnow, and most reissues of her earlier work use this form of her name. Her post-Dollmaker books included the historical studies Seedtime on the Cumberland, 1960, and Flowering of the Cumberland, 1963. These two extraordinary histories of the pioneer settlement of the Old Southwest frontier—Tennessee and Kentucky—were based on extensive archival research Arnow conducted in original records. Pioneering works of what would later be called 'micro-history' or 'history from the bottom up,' Arnow's work used original records and sources to look at the way these early settlers actually lived and worked and their material culture. Her last books were the novels The Weedkiller's Daughter, 1970, The Kentucky Trace, 1974, and the memoir Old Burnside, 1977.

She died in 1986, aged 77, at her home in Washtenaw County, Michigan. Michigan State University Press brought out her previously unpublished second novel, Between the Flowers, in 1999, and The Collected Short Stories of Harriette Simpson Arnow in 2005.

== Continuing influence ==
On June 28, 2008, Ann Arbor eatery Zingerman's Roadhouse hosted The Harriette Arnow Tribute Dinner. Promotional materials referring to the dinner as "Ypsitucky Supper" caused some local controversy due to the often derogatory nature of the term Ypsitucky. Zingerman's co-founder Ari Weinzweig claimed no responsibility for the nickname of the dinner.

== Published works ==
=== Novels ===
- Mountain Path (1936) (as Harriette Simpson)
- Hunter's Horn (1949) (as Harriette Arnow)
- The Dollmaker (1954) (as Harriette Arnow)
- The Weedkiller's Daughter (1970)
- The Kentucky Trace (1974)
- Between the Flowers (1999)

=== Short fiction ===
- The Collected Short Stories of Harriette Simpson Arnow (2005)

=== Non-fiction ===
- Seedtime on the Cumberland (1960)
- Flowering of the Cumberland (1963)
- Old Burnside (1977)
