= Urban Appalachians =

Emigrants from Appalachians

Urban Appalachians refers to people from or with close ancestral ties to Appalachia who are living in metropolitan areas outside of the region. As a result of multi-decade migrations, most of these individuals are not first generation migrants from the region. This mass exodus of Appalachian migrants out of Appalachia began to occur before many of the migrational landing cities were founded. It was not until the period following World War II, however, that large-scale migration to urban areas became commonplace due to the decline of coal mining and the increase in industrial jobs available in the Midwestern United States and the Northeastern United States. The migration of Appalachians is often known as the Hillbilly Highway.

A large majority of Appalachian migrants settled in industrial centers in the Midwest and Northeast, with Detroit, Chicago, Milwaukee, Cleveland, Cincinnati, Indianapolis, Toledo, Baltimore, Washington, D.C., and Pittsburgh being known for particularly large populations. Cities that have smaller but significant populations include Columbus, Fort Wayne, Lansing, Hazel Park and Dayton.

In terms of national origin urban Appalachian ancestral regions reflect the varied heritage of the Appalachian region. With predominately Scots-Irish, Melungeon, English, Scottish, Irish and Welsh. There were also large numbers of people with German, Central European, and Southern European ancestry, who were recruited to work in the coal and steel industries. A related phenomenon to the exodus of Appalachians on the Hillbilly Highway is the Great Migration of black southerners, including some from Appalachia.

Appalachian migrants came from numerous areas of Appalachia. Majority came from coal camp villages in the Cumberland Plateau or Allegheny Mountains; others came from cities such as Knoxville, Charleston, West Virginia, or the Huntington-Ashland area.

During the period of the nation's industrial expansion, the majority worked in factories, particularly in the automotive industry. More recently, work in the service economy is becoming more predominant. The decline of industry in the Rust Belt starting in the 1970s had a negative effect on blue-collar workers of Appalachian backgrounds, and many returned home.

Despite the Appalachian migrants' having come from different states and backgrounds, their shared history and the common experience of living in the hills, towns, valleys or foothills of Appalachia resulted in a regional culture that many urban Appalachians celebrate today.

== The Hillbilly Highway ==
Thousands of Appalachian migrants migrated to industrial cities under a variety of circumstances during the 19th and 20th centuries. This migration came in response to ads offering financial opportunities in the burgeoning auto factories. Migrations began during World War I. Appalachian migrants were recruited to work in auto and steel factories and during World War II thousands of Appalachians came to work in defense plants. Large migrations out of Appalachia increased in response to layoffs in the coal industry. When coal mines began to shut down, many coal towns were entirely depopulated. During the 1950s, special bus runs were made to transport laid off miners and their families to metropolitan areas. During the 1950s over 1,000 Harlan County, Kentucky residents a year took a bus that ran daily from Harlan to Detroit, Michigan for the Autoboom. It was during this 1940 to 1970 period that entire neighborhoods in the nation's cities became Appalachian, but the foundations of those communities were often laid much earlier in the century. Cities like Hazel Park, Michigan are still made up almost entirely of urban Appalachian and Melungeon descendants. The period from 1940 to 1970 is often referred to as the "Hillbilly Highway".

== Forming communities ==
Many Urban Appalachians were employed by factories such as Wright Aeronautical (later General Electric), Armco (later AK Steel), U.S. Shoe, General Motors, Chrysler, Frigidaire, Ford, Champion Paper, Nutone, National Cash Register (now NCR Corporation), Delco, and Newport Steel, to name a few. These and many other factories drew people to the cities from Appalachia. The location of these factories often determined the location of Appalachian neighborhoods. Concentrations of low cost housing became temporary "ports of entry" for some families and long term homes for others. Layoffs, changeovers, plant shutdowns and long stretches of unemployment were common experiences. Some faced discrimination in hiring or in their search for housing. Uptown, Chicago was a notable enclave of Appalachians in the 1960s, earning the nickname "Hillbilly Heaven". For some Appalachians, doors to good jobs or good neighborhoods were closed. Banks did not always want to make mortgage loans to Appalachian families in certain areas, and insurance companies often refused them coverage through the practice of redlining.

Newcomers lived with relatives or friends. When the layoffs came people would be faced with the choice to return to the hills for the time or room with relatives in or near the city. Networks of family and friends were the main support. Soon churches were organized, becoming an additional means of spiritual and material sustenance. As neighborhoods became heavily Appalachian, churches, stores, bars, restaurants, and social clubs were established to serve this population. Promoted by the radio and recording industries, urban Appalachian musicians and singers flourished. Today, Appalachian festivals in Dayton and Cincinnati draw over 40,000 people annually to celebrate their heritage.

Family networks with rural roots and urban branches became larger and stronger than before migration. These kinship networks were flexible and often included non-kin in a network of mutual support, informal education and nurture. Familial systems and a set of experiences first in the mountains and now in working-class neighborhoods in the city are the core concepts in understanding urban Appalachian social structure. Today a large population of Appalachian families boast members in both rural and urban areas, there is very little difference between rural and urban Appalachian culture. The major differences among Appalachians are now most likely to appear along class lines.

== Facing social problems and stereotypes ==
Some family networks were weakened or dismantled by the moves from farm to coal camp to metropolitan area. These weakened families became the concern of social agencies and church-sponsored outreach ministries. A number of these families became welfare dependent and impoverished. This poverty became the basis of many stereotypes of the impoverished SAM or "southern Appalachian migrant." Newspaper stories about welfare, crime and violence and "poverty posters" of large, poorly dressed Appalachian families caused many urban Appalachians to disassociate themselves from an open Appalachian identity. Negative stereotypes caused much suffering among people from Appalachia who moved to metropolitan areas.

Thousands of families experienced some form of failure in their efforts to make new lives in the city. Some returned to the Appalachian region, some stayed and experienced the worst of urban poverty. Advocacy and service organizations such as the Urban Appalachian Council were formed to respond to the needs of this population.

Even the strongest families, especially in the inner city, experienced a variety of hardships. Children were ridiculed because of the way they talked, the way they dressed or because of where they lived. Going to school was often just a matter of survival with little education occurring. Unable to cope with the hostile environment of large and bureaucratic urban public schools, generations of inner city Appalachians have had to cope without the benefit of even a high school education.

== Creating a neighborhood culture ==
Some researchers have seen urban Appalachians as an emerging ethnic group, forming group cohesion and identity in a fashion similar to earlier "urban villagers" arriving in America's cities. Anthropologist Rhoda Halperin describes the culture of an urban Appalachian neighborhood in terms of a set of adaptations Appalachians have made to their circumstances. No notable distinction between rural Appalachian and urban migrant Appalachians and their descendants was found. The features of community life produced by their adaptations include " . . . everyday practices - caring for children and the elderly, providing work, helping in times of crisis, granting favors, passing along information or lending support." These practices, are embedded in specific neighborhood structures that are old and enduring: the extended family, the church, and the neighborhood as a place that confers working class identity. Halperin identifies the strengths of an integrated working-class neighborhood as strong intergenerational ties, informal educational processes through which adults instruct the young, intricate patterns of exchange that provide food, shelter, and care of dependents, longevity of families in the neighborhood, householding (provisioning) practices, and the gifts of oratory, storytelling, and writing skills.

A balanced view of urban Appalachians should include the socioeconomic impacts of decades of industrialization, out-migration, deindustrialization, and deterioration of core city neighborhoods. Lack of good jobs, decent housing and good schools in safe neighborhoods have been barriers for many urban Appalachian communities, alongside instances of social discrimination. Scholars note that ongoing socioeconomic mobility for urban Appalachians depends on broader factors like economic policies addressing underemployment and urban infrastructure as well as community-level adaptation to changing labor markets.

== Making a contribution ==
Most urban Appalachians have benefited in many ways from the move to the city, both economically and socially. Midwestern cities are home to thousands of practicing musicians, craftspeople, storytellers, poets, writers, and other artists. Appalachians have contributed to the civic, economic and cultural life of their communities serving as ministers, elected officials, union leaders, and in thousands of small businesses.

== See also ==
- Hillbilly Highway
- History of the Appalachian people in Baltimore
- Upland South
- Okie
- Settlement schools
- Social and economic stratification in Appalachia
- Appalachia
- Council of the Southern Mountains
- Great Migration (African American) – the first "Great Migration" of African Americans prior to World War II
- Second Great Migration (African American) – the post-World War II continuation of the above, which saw much greater migration from Appalachia
- Uptown, Chicago
- Hillbilly Elegy – a memoir by future U.S. Senator JD Vance, a son of the Appalachian diaspora.
- Butternut (people)
- Pennsyltucky
