= Hillbilly Highway =

Out-migration from the Appalachian Highlands

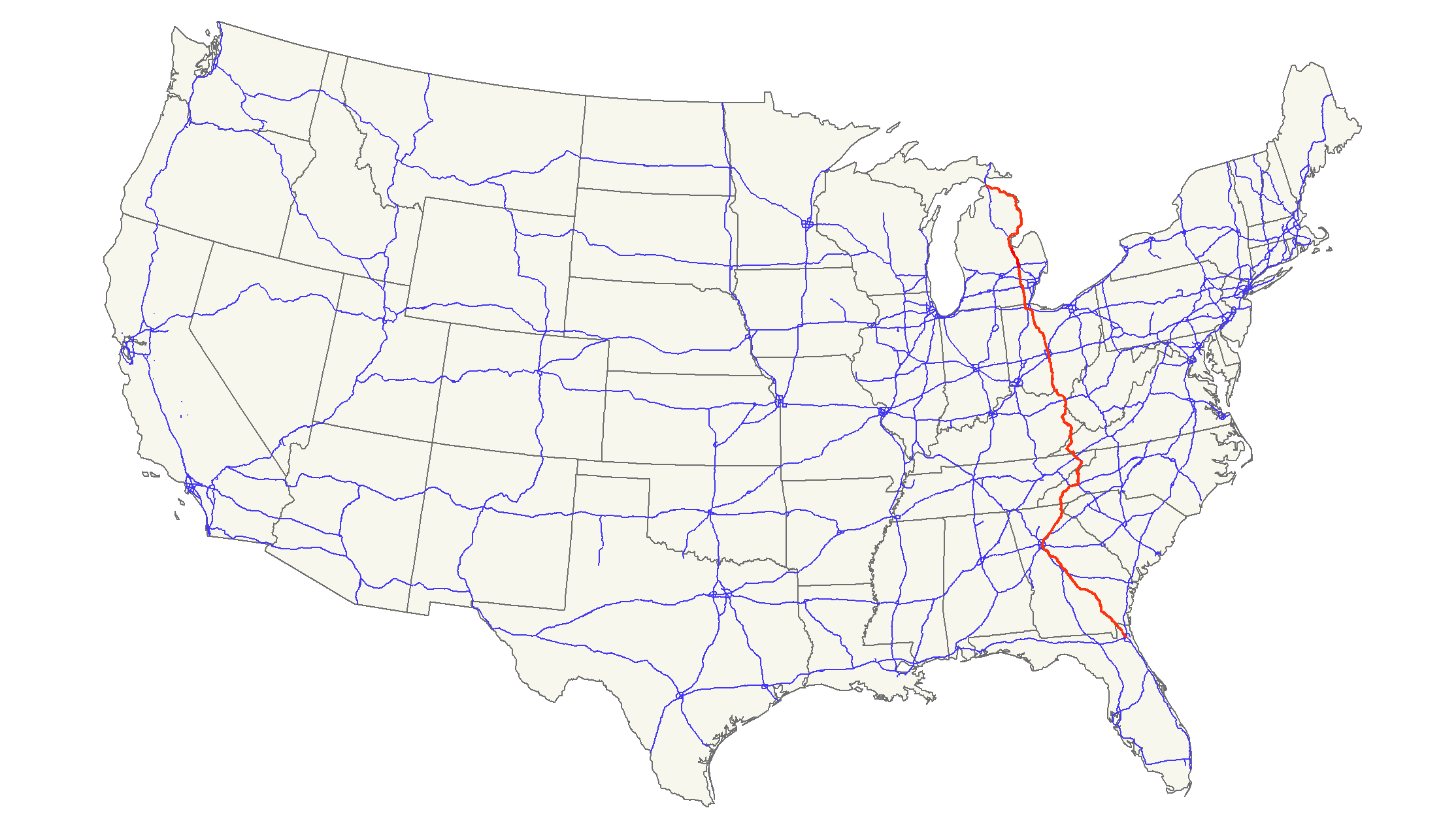

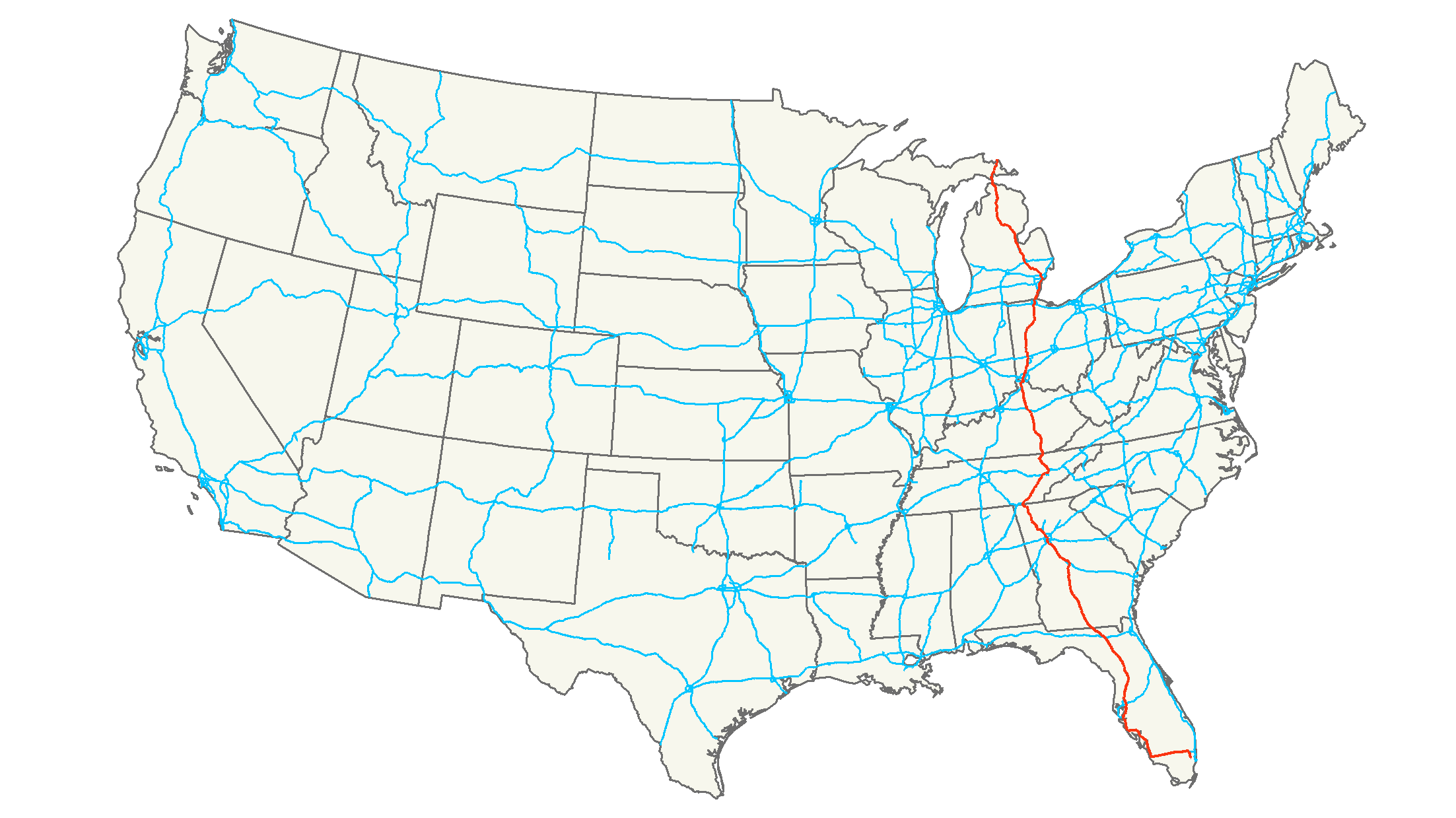
U.S. Route 23 (top) and Interstate 75 (bottom), roadways that have each been dubbed the "Hillbilly Highway"

The Hillbilly Highway is a term used to describe the outward migration of poor whites from the Appalachian Highlands region of the United States to industrialized cities in the Northern United States, the Midwestern United States, and the Western United States, starting in the years following World War II. Many of those who left were looking for better-paying industrial jobs and higher standards of living. Many of these migrants were formerly in the coal mining industry, which started to decline in 1940s. The word hillbilly refers to a negative stereotype of poor whites from Appalachia.

The etymology of the term hillbilly is not clear, though there is some consistency to the idea that it may be of Scottish origin, combining the term hill-folk and the term billy which referred to someone as a "companion" or "comrade." The term first appears in print in the United States in 1900 to refer to someone in the south who is poor and does not comply with acceptable behaviors and appearances of late Victorian white society.

Many of these Appalachian migrants have gone to major industrial centers such as Detroit, Chicago, Cleveland, Cincinnati, Pittsburgh, Baltimore, Washington, D.C., Milwaukee, Toledo and Muncie, while others have travelled west to California. Many of the Appalachians live in concentrated enclaves, an example being Uptown, Chicago, which was nicknamed "Hillbilly Heaven" in the 1960s. While most often used in this metaphoric sense, the term is sometimes used to refer to specific stretches of roadway, such as U.S. Route 23, or Interstate 75. The participants in the Hillbilly Highway are known as Urban Appalachians. The migration is not a finite process, as it is continuing today and the migrants commonly move back to their home states during retirement, or relocate only temporarily.

== Appalachia ==
Appalachia includes the whole of West Virginia, and parts of Alabama, Georgia, Kentucky, Maryland, Mississippi, North Carolina, Ohio, Pennsylvania, South Carolina, Tennessee, and Virginia. The region consists of 420 counties in 13 states. The Appalachia is divided into 13 regions but is grouped into three commonly known sections; northern, central, and southern. Throughout the Appalachian region there are at least 31 mountains. The Appalachian Regional Commission, a federal-state partnership that currently focuses on economic and infrastructure development, was created in the 1960s to address poverty and unemployment in the region. In FY 2007, the Appalachian Regional Commission designated 78 counties in 9 states as distressed, based on low per-capita income and high rates of poverty and unemployment (of 410 counties in 13 states included as Appalachian). The ARC notes that some severely distressed areas still lack basic infrastructure, such as water and sewer systems. The 1990 Census indicated that the poverty rate in central rural Appalachia was 27 percent. In West Virginia, the 2000 poverty rate statewide was 17.9%; in nine counties more than a quarter of the population lived below the poverty line, with percentages as high as 37.7%. Un- and under-employment rates are higher than the nation's average. Breathitt County, Kentucky, had a 9.9% unemployment rate averaged over 2001–2003, a 33.2% poverty rate in 2000 (down from a twenty-year high of 39.5% in 1990), and only 57.5% of adults had high school diplomas in 2000.

== Coal mining ==
Coal mining has been integral to the region and its economy. West Virginia is one of the largest coal producing state in the Appalachian region. One feature of the Appalachian coal mines was the existence of company towns. In the company towns, the coal companies provided the "municipal" services, owned the homes and the stores, where the accepted currency was usually company scrip (despite laws in some states against it) and the prices were excessive. Some of these towns were described by the U.S. Coal Commission in 1922 as being in a state of disrepair "beyond the power of verbal description or even photographic illustration, since neither words nor pictures can portray the atmosphere of abandoned dejection or reproduce the smells." Eventually union struggles occurred in these towns; in central Appalachia miners battled to unionize the mines from the 1890s to the 1940s and fought again from the late 1970s to 1999. Some company towns tried to become models of social welfare, in order to dissuade workers from unionizing. Nonetheless, "mine wars" erupted, including in Matewan, West Virginia on May 19, 1920.

=== The decline of mining and the move north ===
Given the instability of coal prices, particularly after World War I ended, and the ongoing union fights, many miners chose to leave the industry and migrate north for jobs. This resulted in the economic exploitation of coal workers which is a period from 1880 to 1930 called the "Coal Wars". One of the most notable events during the coal wars was the Battle of Blair Mountain. This battle came to be known as the largest labor uprising in the United States history as well as being the largest armed uprising since the Civil War. This tragic event lead to upwards of 100 people being killed while many more were arrested. With the added friction in coal mining, and prohibition taking full effect, many so called mountain people carried on selling moonshine since that was one of the prime sources of income at the time. Though this trend would start to slowdown due to the increasing interest of the government to go after these people since it was after all illegal. Factories like General Motors started recruiting people after World War II, causing around seven million people to migrate North. Whites tended to go to areas in Ohio and Pittsburgh, while African-Americans tended to go to areas in Detroit and Baltimore.

== Appalachian migration ==
As much so as coal mining, migration has been an important part of the Appalachian experience. Large numbers of people migrated out of Appalachia in the 20th century for economic reasons. Between 1910 and 1960, millions of Southerners left their home states of Tennessee, Kentucky, the Carolinas, Virginia and West Virginia. A large percentage of those leaving Kentucky, West Virginia, and Tennessee went north for jobs in the industrial sector.

Many West Virginians and Kentuckians migrated to the industrial cities of Ohio, for jobs in rubber and steel. Industrial towns in Southern Ohio, including Dayton and Cincinnati, were favorites for migrants from Eastern Kentucky because they remained close to home. Some Ohio companies (including Champion Paper Company, Lorillard Tobacco Company, and Armco Steel) reportedly recruited their labor force from specific counties in the mountains, and gave preference to employees' family members when hiring new workers, making out-migration from rural Appalachia easier.

== Detroit ==
In a 1935 article in The Nation, Louis Adamic writes that the "hill-billies" were believed by Detroit auto manufacturing employers to be "safe" – that is, not inclined to unionize. Adamic reports that auto companies were recruiting during the early 1930s with the belief that these rural people had not been influenced by ideas of unionism. The article goes on to report that the hill-billies were looked down upon by almost everyone, due to their extremely low standard of living and lack of familiarity with modern plumbing, and because they were seen as taking away jobs from the old-time automotive workers. The advent of assembly lines meant that unskilled workers could ably perform tasks at manufacturing plants, so these unskilled mountain folk were adequate employees.

=== Migrant identity ===
The Appalachian people who migrated to Detroit (and in smaller numbers to Flint) in order to work in the automotive plants gained an identity distinct from the one that they possessed in their home state. Many families were forced to separate and adapt to new environments, causing traumatic experiences. The discrimination and negative stereotypes that they faced caused new issues that went into following generations. The migrants felt out of place and had a hard time feeling a part of their new community. In their home states, people saw themselves as distinct from those living in other parts of the state, or in a different part of the South. Once they migrated to Michigan, they were lumped together as southern white laborers, and a group consciousness based on that label emerged. Migrants from all over Appalachia began to feel a social solidarity with each other, preferring to work and live beside other Southerners than with Northerners. It was believed that the southern Appalachian migrants began to resemble one another by characteristics less rapidly than Northern rural migrants because of their group consciousness and the persistence of certain southern regional attitudes, and an acute awareness of the difference between themselves and other native-born white Americans. Because the Appalachian migrants had no cultural context for situations they encountered in northern industrial cities, their reactions were dictated by their rural southern lives and attitudes. This led to these migrants going back to their old homes during holidays and layoffs where everyday life seemed more familiar to them. As many as 35% of migrants would return to their old homes from places like Flint and Michigan during such periods of layoffs between 1940 and 1970.

== In popular culture ==
Country singer Bobby Bare's 1963 hit single "Detroit City", written by Danny Dill and Mel Tillis, describes the homesickness and culture shock commonly experienced by Southern migrants.

Singer Steve Earle wrote a song titled "Hillbilly Highway", recorded on his 1986 album Guitar Town. Also released as a single, "Hillbilly Highway" recounts the story of three generations of Appalachian men who leave their homes to find work elsewhere.

Country singer Dwight Yoakam's song "Readin', Rightin', Rt. 23" from his 1987 album "Hillbilly Deluxe" describes how, for the children of coal miners south of Prestonsburg, Kentucky, the most important things that they learn are reading, writing, and to take U.S. Route 23 out of the area to find factory jobs in the industrial cities north of Appalachia. However, the singer laments that the same migration that might lead them to financial stability could also separate them from their families and social support system.

== See also ==
- Council of the Southern Mountains
- Detroit City (song)
- Hillbilly Elegy
- History of the Appalachian people in Baltimore
- History of the Appalachian people in Chicago
- History of the Appalachian people in Metro Detroit
- Mountain white
- Okie
- Poor White
- Urban Appalachians
- Urban Appalachian Council
- White trash
