= Stereotypes of white Americans =

Stereotypes of White Americans in the United States are generalizations about the character, behavior, or appearance of white Americans.

As the definition of white Americans has changed over time, so have stereotypes about white people. Different groups of minorities have different stereotypes about white Americans. Historically, stereotypes about white people were more likely to be based on specific ethnicities. Stereotypes of white people also generally tend to vary according to class lines.

In the media, White Americans are often stereotyped to be white-collar suburbanites who are members of the middle class or wealthy.

Whites are stereotyped to be racist, greedy, materialistic and prejudiced against other cultures.

In the United States, whiteness is often associated with goodness, morality, intelligence and attractiveness.

Black people often stereotyped whites as prejudiced, corrupt, mean or selfish.

== Stereotypes ==
White people are often presented in a positive light in American media as heroes, leaders, decision makers, central characters, experts, or talking heads while ethnic minorities and non-white people are often constructed frequently as "other," different, deviant, quaint or exotic and often stereotyped.

White Americans are also stereotyped to have no culture and not seasoning their food. In 2023, Chinese people made fun of white people on social media for eating bland foods such as raw salads, boiled eggs, chicken breast, sliced ham, and bologna sandwiches by calling it the "lunch of suffering", contrasting it with the rich and spicy Chinese cuisine.

White people are stereotyped to be ruthless, racist oppressors and colonizers who oppress and exploit minorities such as Black people and Native Americans. White people are stereotyped to be racist because it stems from European colonism and the Atlantic slave trade.

The 1992 movie White Men Can't Jump depicts and discusses the stereotype that white men can't slam dunk in basketball, only Black men can.

=== Social stereotypes ===
The blog Stuff White People Like addressed early 21st century stereotypes of white hipster bohemians in a humorous way. Comedian Dave Chappelle also used humor to address the stereotype that white Americans cannot dance in a sketch in which groups of white people erupt into frenzied dancing every time they hear an electric guitar.

Stereotypes of white Americans have been shown to vary according to socioeconomic status. In general, stereotypes of white people portray upper class white Americans as WASPs and lower class white Americans as "backward", "barely-educated" rednecks. Rednecks, conversely are seen as "racist, hot-headed, too physical, violent, uncouth, loud, mean, undereducated—and proud of it."

During the COVID-19 pandemic, white women perceived as entitled or rude were often stereotypically dubbed as 'Karens' while displaying unhinged behavior.

The dumb blonde stereotype is a unintelligent, superficial white woman with blonde hair associated with stupidity, promiscuity and gold-digging. The basic white girl stereotype is a white girl from a suburban or rural area who drinks Starbucks daily, enjoys pumpkin spice lattes, wears uggs and is obsessed with social media such as Tumblr.

The white trash stereotype represents a poor, unrefined, unintelligent white person from a rural area who lives in poverty in a trailer park and lives off welfare and food stamps. They usually are portrayed as having a lack of morals, poor hygiene, inbreeding, take drugs such as methamphetamine, and drinking alcohol excessively. It is claimed that their diet may consist of roadkill, hunted game, and cheap food such as McDonald's and Taco Bell, along with government cheese, spam, WIC-approved foods, white bread, canned goods, and instant ramen noodles. It is commonly thought that many individuals labeled as white trash in the southern United States have connections to the Ku Klux Klan. In addition to their general racism, the white trash are believed to harbor animosity towards all minority groups. They may also believe that there exists a White genocide conspiracy theory within the United States aimed at eradicating the white race through immigration and the interbreeding of white individuals with various minority groups. Poor rural whites are also stereotyped to practice incest and bestiality.

The term "wigger" refers to a white male or female who is passionate about hip hop music, admires African American culture, and sometimes wishes to be black because of their love for hip hop and African American culture. Celebrities commonly associated with this stereotype include Eminem, Paul Wall, Jack Harlow, Iggy Azalea, Bhad Bhabie, and Woah Vicky—a white woman who gained fame in the 2010s by pretending to be black. Wiggers often use African American Vernacular English and are typically linked to wearing baggy clothes, sportswear, certain brand names, or styles that are popular in hip-hop or street fashion, mimicking African American culture but grew up in a safe neighborhood in the suburbs. The 2003 movie Malibu's Most Wanted is about a privileged, high class suburban white boy who aspires to a black gangsta rapper with an urban "hood" aesthetic.

==== Academic studies ====
An early study of stereotypes of white people found in works of fiction which were written by Black authors was conducted by African-American sociologist Tilman C. Cothran in 1950. White Americans were commonly viewed as feeling superior to Black people, harboring hatred for Black people, being brutish, impulsive, or mean, having a sense of pride, and antisemitic beliefs. In another study on stereotypes in 1951, Cothran observed that the Black lower and upper classes at that time had the least favorable stereotypes about white people, and the Black middle class the most favorable.

In a 1972 study, American white people were stereotyped as "materialistic and pleasure loving" when compared with Asian and Black Americans. In a study among college students of different races in 1982, White Americans were described as materialistic, ambitious, intelligent, conventional, industrious, and conservative. The study's author noted that the white stereotype had decreased in favorability over the years while the Black stereotype had increased.

A 2013 University of Michigan study of stereotypes that American people of color had about white women found that white women were perceived as "attractive, blonde, ditsy, shallow, privileged, sexually available, and appearance focused," and that these stereotypes matched American media portrayals of white women.

In a 2018 study of children of different races, six year olds chose photos of white men as being "really smart" over photos of white women or Black people.

=== Negative portrayals of white people ===
As the social definition of "white people" has changed over the years, studies have shown that members of different races, ethnicities, and nationalities have different stereotypes of white people. Before the 1980s, ethnic groups such as the Irish, Italians, Armenians, and Polish people were portrayed in popular media and culture in a negative fashion. Stereotypes of West Virginians and Alabamians include incest and inbreeding. Poor white people in the Appalachian region have often been stereotyped as hillbillies. White Hispanic and Latino Americans are often overlooked by the U.S. mass media, and frequently, American social perceptions incorrectly give the terms Hispanic or Latino a racial value, usually mixed-race, such as Mestizo, while they, in turn, are overrepresented in the U.S. Hispanic mass media, are admired by it, and shape social perceptions of Hispanic and Latino Americans.

Serial killers are often stereotyped to be white males. In horror films, rural white Americans are often depicted as inbred, malevolent, and brutal murderers, a characterization commonly referred to as the "hillbilly horror" trope.

== See also ==
- Stereotypes of African Americans
- Stereotypes of Hispanic and Latino Americans in the United States
- Stereotypes of East Asians in the United States
- Stereotypes of Arabs and Muslims in the United States
- Acting white
- Angry white male
- Anti-Americanism
- Basic (slang)
- Buckra
- Crackers
- NASCAR dad
- Redneck
- Soccer mom
- Trailer trash
- Trixie
- US stereotypes
- Valley girl
- White backlash
- White fragility
- White guilt
- White nationalism
- Wigger
- Reverse racism
- Go back to where you came from
