= SWPL =

SWPL may refer to:

- Scottish Women's Premier League, an association football league in Scotland
- South West Peninsula League, an association football league in England
- Stuff White People Like, a satirical weblog
