= Trailer park =

Temporary or permanent area for mobile homes

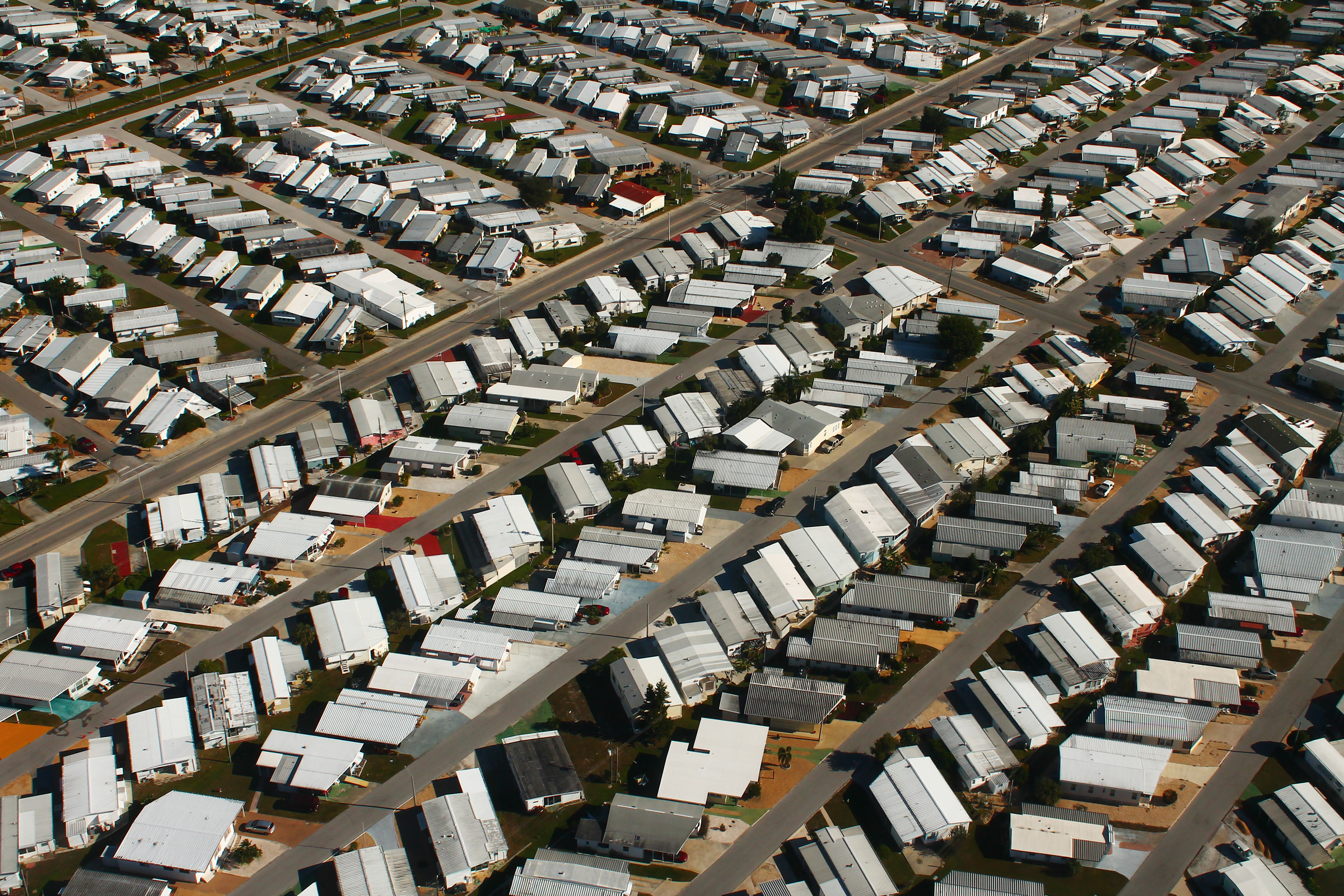
A mobile home park in Bradenton, Florida

A trailer park, caravan park, mobile home park, mobile home community or manufactured home community is a temporary or permanent area for mobile homes and travel trailers. Advantages include low cost compared to other housing, and quick and easy moving to a new area (for example, when taking a job in a distant place while keeping the same home).

Trailer parks, especially in American culture, are stereotypically viewed as lower income housing for occupants living at or below the poverty line who have low social status. Despite the advances in trailer home technology, the trailer park image survives as evoked by a statement from Presidential adviser James Carville who, in the course of one of the Bill Clinton White House political scandals, suggested: "Drag $100 bills through trailer parks, there's no telling what you'll find," in reference to Paula Jones.

Tornadoes and hurricanes often inflict serious damage on trailer parks, usually because the structures are not secured to the ground and their construction much less robust in high winds than regular houses. However, most modern manufactured homes are built to withstand high winds, using hurricane straps and proper foundations.

== By country ==
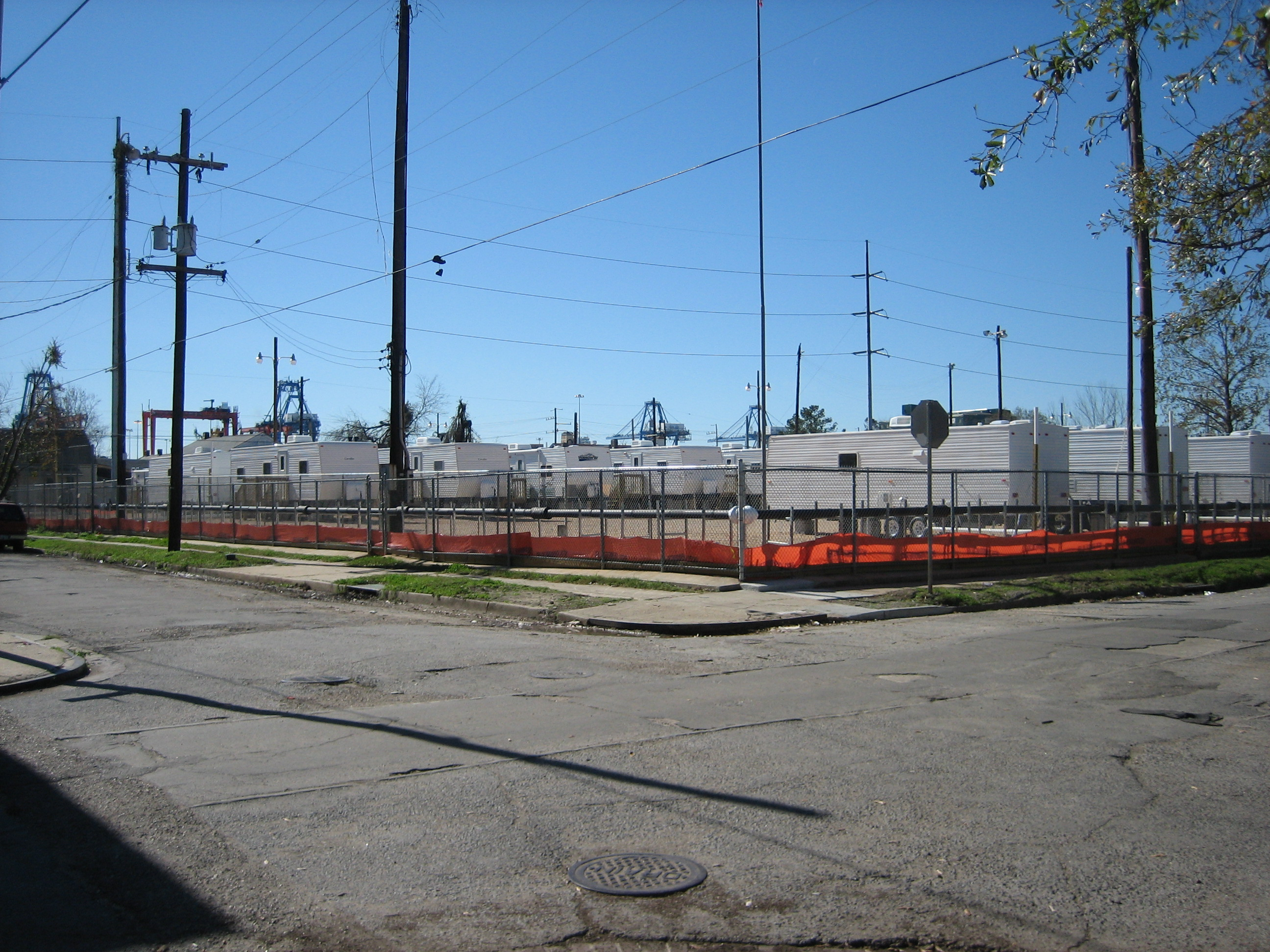
New Orleans in 2006 after Hurricane Katrina: A park in an unflooded part of town became the site of a FEMA trailer park for people whose homes were damaged or destroyed.

=== In the United States ===
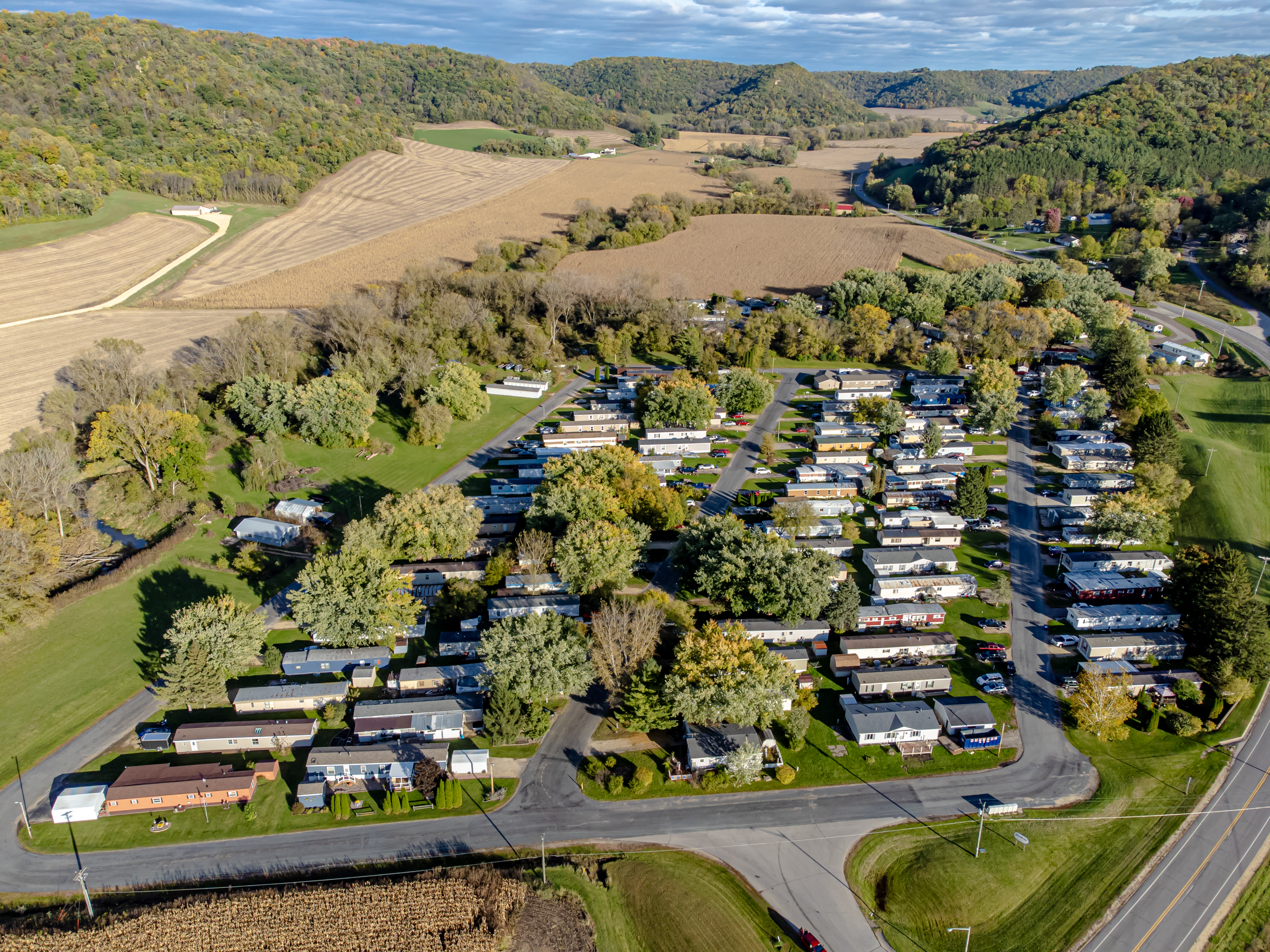
Mobile home park in La Crosse County, Wisconsin

The negative perception of trailer parks was not improved by the creation of emergency trailer parks by the Federal Emergency Management Agency (FEMA) for the displaced victims of Hurricane Katrina, the quality and temporary nature of which was disputed.

Many stereotypes have developed about residents in trailer parks, which are similar to stereotypes of the poor. The term trailer trash is often used in the same vein as the derogatory American terms white trash and ghetto. Though trailer parks appear throughout the United States, they are often associated with the Deep South and rural areas. In Dover-Foxcroft, Maine, the Town Select Board debated the implementation of a moratorium preventing mobile or manufactured homes from being built or installed. Trailer parks became viewed as a valuable asset in the late 2010s. During that decade, REITs, private equity funds, and middle-class people looking to escape the corporate world bought them up from small mom-and-pop owners.

More recently referred to in the U.S. as "mobile home parks" or "manufactured housing communities", the stereotypes are often just that. Retirement communities exist in many locales that permit mobile home parks as "55+ parks" in keeping with the Housing for Older Persons Act (HOPA). Generally, at least one homeowner in these communities must be age 55 or over, and those under age 18 are rarely permitted to live there. These can be gated communities with amenities, such as swimming pools, clubhouses and onsite maintenance. Homes are often permanently installed on foundations. But residents may not own the land their homes occupy.

==== Corporate investment ====
Mobile home parks in the U.S. have become an attractive investment for financial firms such as Carlyle Group, Apollo Global Management and TPG Capital. In the early 2020s, an individual mobile home park can be sold in the tens of millions of dollars. Over 100,000 US mobile home sites were estimated to be owned by large firms in 2019. One firm, Stockbridge Capital Group, owner of about 200 mobile-home parks throughout the US, "saw a return on investment of more than 30 percent between late 2016 and the end of 2017." The company's expansion into this market was facilitated by $1.3 billion in financing from Fannie Mae, which has called mobile homes "inherently affordable." Profitability for the firms owning the parks has in some cases been tied to rent increases, and has not necessarily translated into good maintenance of the mobile homes. Efforts are being mounted to allow trailer park residents a chance to buy their own trailer park and thus own the land they live on; for instance, in Colorado, trailer park owners must give residents 90 days' notice before selling. In San Antonio, Texas, residents of the Mission Trails Mobile Home Community negotiated with developer White-Conlee who would be contracted to build luxury condominiums.

=== Outside the United States ===
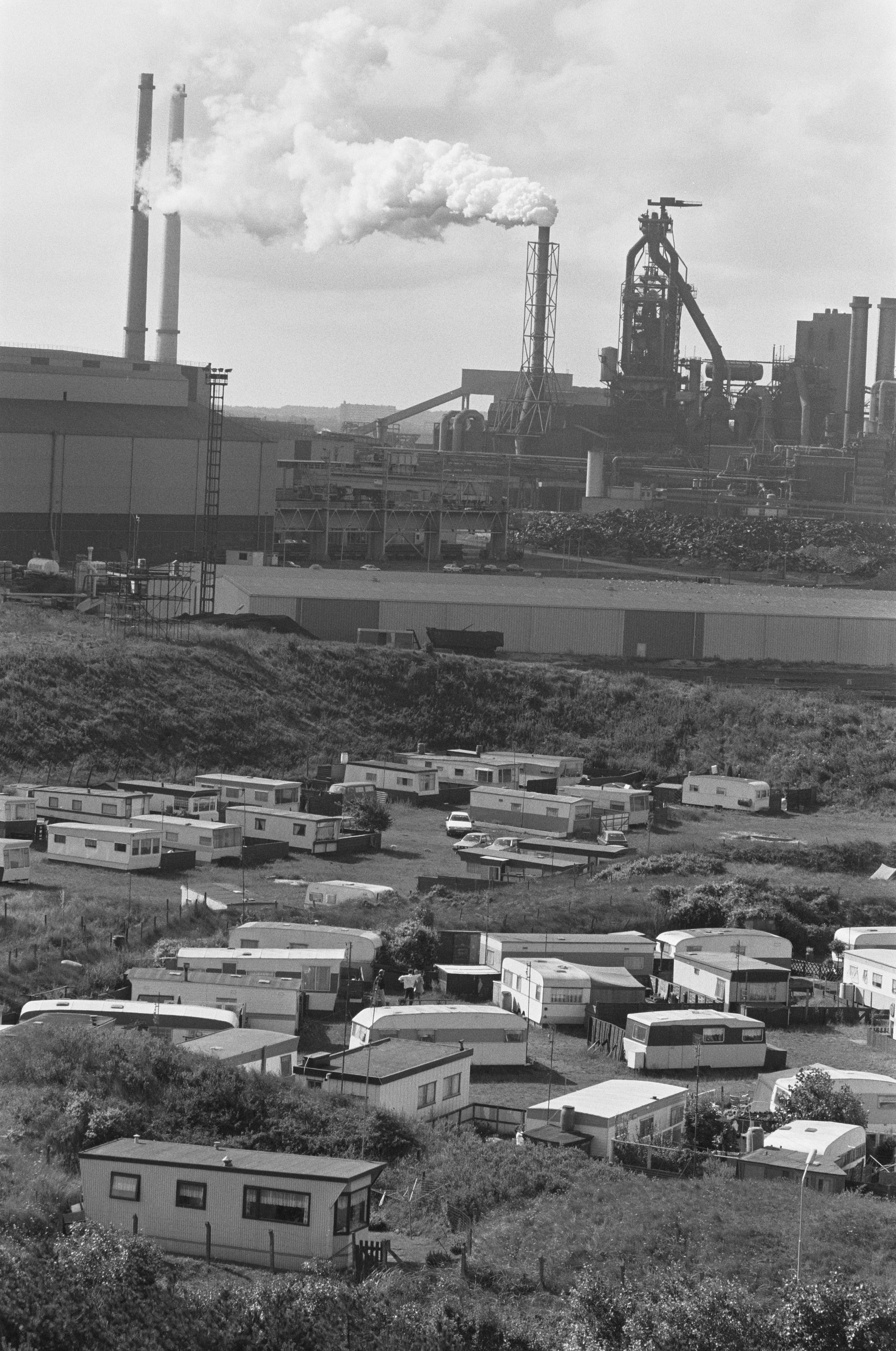
Trailer park at an industrial area in Wijk aan Zee, the Netherlands, in 1988

==== Disputed trailer parks ====
While the majority of trailer parks are used as permanent residences, and are paid for in the usual way by residents, a minority are used by nomadic people who in some cases may be occupying them illegally.

In Britain and Ireland, the term halting site is sometimes used for some trailer parks. The biggest difference in Europe is the presence of unauthorised halting sites (or trailer parks). This stems from the practice of traditionally itinerant ethnic groups, such as the Romani and Irish Travellers, to periodically during the year set up a transient community. From the late 1970s onward there was also a growth in New Age travelers culture; these groups espoused alternative lifestyles combined with a Do-It-Yourself punk ethic. The latter were a commonplace phenomenon in Germany, giving rise to expressions such as Wagenburg, Wagendorf, and Bauwagenplatz ("wagon fort", "trailer village" and "construction trailer site" respectively).

Either rejected from or refusing to seek entrance in municipally authorised halting sites, groups of families practising a nomadic lifestyle would trespass in order to camp on land belonging to local communities. These illegal encampments are often resented by local people, owing to their lack of sewage and waste disposal capacity, and the fact that such encampments are often difficult to remove under human rights legislation. The use of land without permission is also illegal, which leads to such groups being moved on by the police or councils.

==== Authorised caravan parks ====
In Germany, the Netherlands and some other European countries, local law allows for normal camping at RV parks for a short time and seasonal camping for holidaymakers, and also long-time camping (for years) with hardly movable travel trailers. Sometimes these inhabitants also cultivate a garden. Some cities allow a long-time camping lot to be the regular address registered with the authorities; others do not. Many of mobile home plots are offered by RV parks that allow for all sorts of camping and offer extra plots for mobile homes (static caravans).The cost for such a plot tends to be between €400 and €1.500 a year, depending on the location and facilities.

In France, living in a trailer or mobile home for more than three months is prohibited by law, even if the resident owns the land; however, building requirements and permissions for self building of recreational solid (static) country cottages are more relaxed in France if one stays within a certain amount of square meters.

In the United Kingdom, "trailers" are commonly known as static caravans, and are generally used for one of two purposes: firstly as holiday homes, designed for short-term living; and secondly as retirement homes for the elderly, designed for long-term occupancy. Both types of trailers usually enjoy good amenities and are surrounded by highly manicured gardens.

In Australia, there is generally no differentiation between a trailer park and an RV park. The term "caravan park" is used to refer to both.

== See also ==
- Favela
- Ghetto
- Halting site
- Public housing
- Gecekondu
- RV park
- Shanty town
- Slum
- Trailer Park Boys
- Trailer trash, a derogatory term for white people who live in trailer parks
- Reefer container housing units
