= Çomar =

Turkish slang term

Çomar is a Turkish slang word used to refer to stereotypical bigoted, lumpen, selfish, greedy, jealous, philistine, and hypocritical working-class Turks perceived as blindly supporting the state.

== Background ==
The word was originally used to refer to large sheepdogs in rural Anatolia known for their unquestionable loyalty to their owners. After the Gezi Park protests, Çomar became a term used against Erdoğan supporters. The word is essentially a Turkish version of "redneck". The Turkish Language Association gave another meaning of the word as "an intolerant, rude, aggressive person".

== See also ==
- Redneck
- Gopnik
