= Trailer trash =

Derogatory term for mobile home dwellers

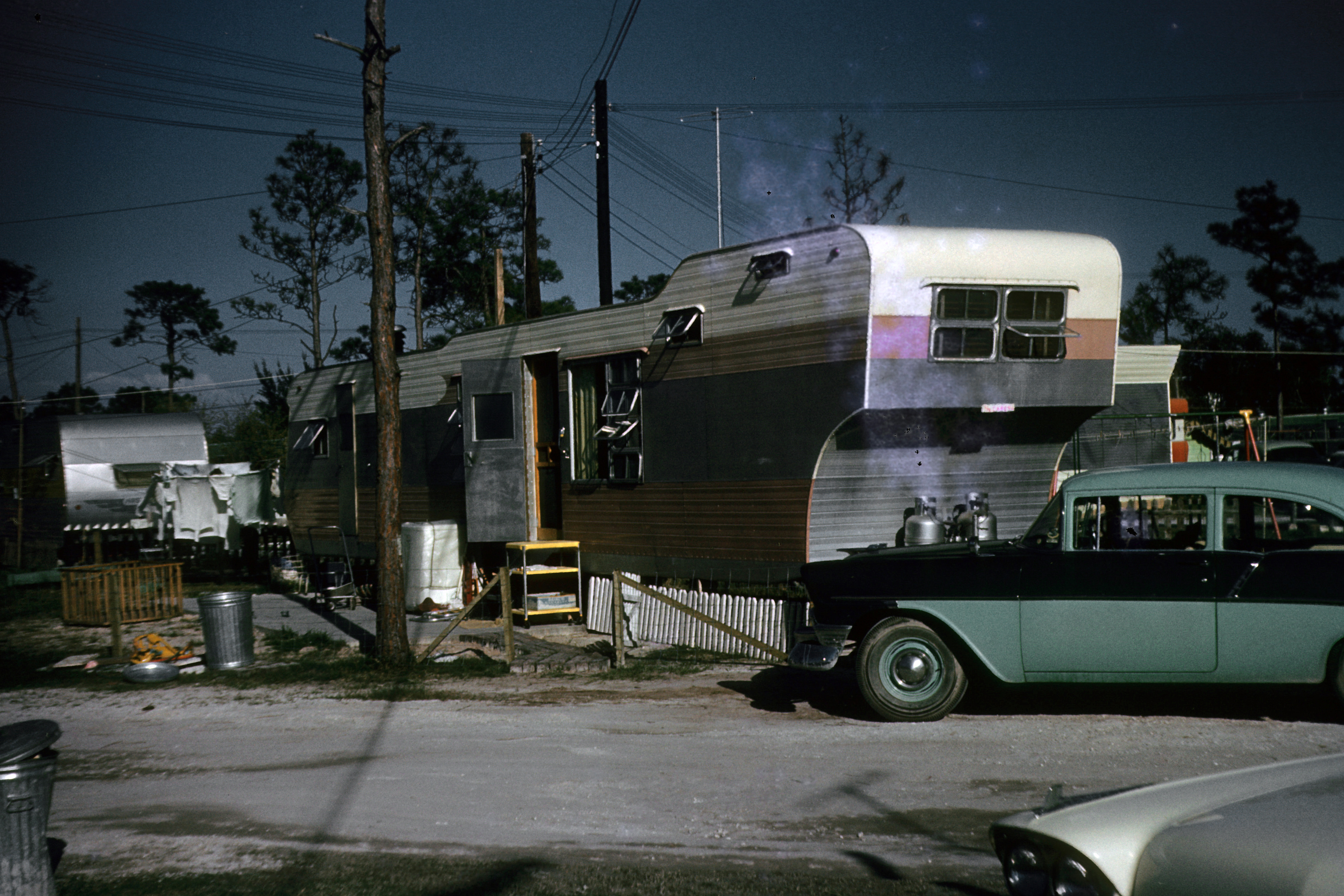
Trailer park in Tampa, Florida, in 1958

Trailer trash is a North American English term for white poor people living in a trailer or a run-down mobile home in a bad neighborhood. It is particularly used to denigrate white people living in such circumstances.

== History ==
In the mid-20th century, poor white people who could not afford to buy suburban-style tract housing began to purchase mobile homes, which were not only cheaper but could be easily relocated if work in one location ran out. These – sometimes by choice and sometimes through local zoning laws – gathered in trailer parks, and the people who lived in them became known as "trailer trash" with the term dating to at least 1952. Despite many of them having jobs, albeit sometimes itinerant ones, the character flaws that had been perceived in poor white trash in the past were transferred to trailer trash, and trailer camps or parks were seen as being inhabited by retired people, migrant workers, and, generally, the poor. By 1968, a survey found that only 13% of those who owned and lived in mobile homes had white collar jobs.

Trailers got their start in the 1930s, and their use proliferated during the housing shortage of World War II when the Federal government used as many as 30,000 of them to house defense workers, soldiers, and sailors throughout the country, but especially around areas with a large military or defense presence, such as Mobile, Alabama and Pascagoula, Mississippi. In her book Journey Through Chaos, reporter Agnes Meyer of The Washington Post traveled throughout the country, reporting on the condition of the "neglected rural areas", and described the people who lived in the trailers, tents, and shacks in such areas as malnourished, unable to read or write, and generally ragged. The workers who came to Mobile and Pascagoula to work in the shipyards there were from the backwoods of the South, "subnormal swamp and mountain folk" whom the locals described as "vermin"; elsewhere, they were called "squatters". They were accused of having loose morals, high illegitimacy and crime rates, and of allowing prostitution to thrive in their "Hillbilly Havens", and letting their children go undisciplined, causing high juvenile delinquency rates. The trailers themselves – sometimes purchased second- or third-hand – were often unsightly, unsanitary, and dilapidated, causing communities to zone them away from the more desirable neighborhoods, which meant away from schools, stores, and other necessary facilities, often literally on the other sides of the railroad tracks.

== See also ==
- Hillbilly
- Pea-pickers
- Pink Flamingos
- Redneck
- White trash
