= Redneck =

Derogatory term in the southern United States

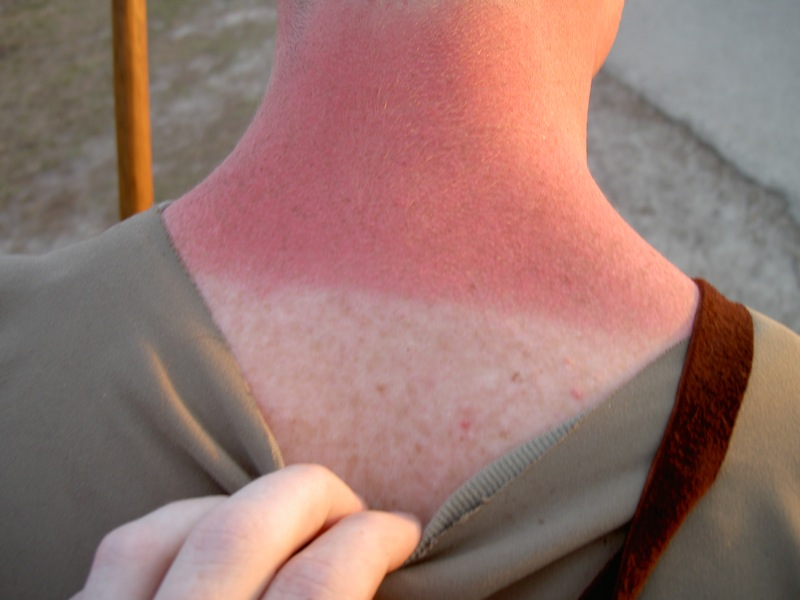
The term may come from the look of a sunburned neck.

Redneck is a derogatory term mainly applied to white Americans perceived to be crass and unsophisticated, closely associated with rural whites of the southern United States. Its meaning possibly stems from the sunburn found on farmers' necks dating back to the late 19th century. Authors Joseph Flora and Lucinda MacKethan describe the stereotype as follows:

Redneck is a derogatory term currently applied to some lower-class and working-class southerners. The term, which came into common usage in the 1930s, is derived from the redneck's beginnings as a "yeoman farmer" whose neck would burn as they toiled in the fields. These yeoman farmers settled along the Virginia, North Carolina, and South Carolina coasts.

Its modern usage is similar in meaning to cracker (especially regarding Texas, Georgia, and Florida), hillbilly (especially regarding Appalachia and the Ozarks), and white trash (but without the last term's suggestions of immorality). In Britain, the Cambridge Dictionary definition states: "A poor, white person without education, esp. one living in the countryside in the southern US, who is believed to have prejudiced ideas and beliefs. This word is usually considered offensive." People from the white South sometimes jocularly call themselves "rednecks" as insider humor.

Some people claim that the term’s origin is that during the West Virginia Mine Wars of the early 1920s, workers organizing for labor rights donned red bandanas, worn tied around their necks, as they marched up Blair Mountain in a pivotal confrontation. The West Virginia Mine Wars Museum commemorates their struggle for fair wages. A monument in front of the George Buckley Community Center in Marmet, WV, part of the "Courage in the Hollers Project" of the West Virginia Mine Wars Museum depicts the silhouettes of four mine workers cut from steel plate, wearing bright red bandanas around their necks or holding them in their hands. However, the term was used as early as 1830 to refer to white rural Southern laborers, so although the 1920s wearers of red bandanas may have used the term, they did not originate it.

By the 1970s, the term had become offensive slang, its meaning expanded to include racism, loutishness, and opposition to modern ways.

Patrick Huber, in his monograph A Short History of Redneck: The Fashioning of a Southern White Masculine Identity, emphasized the theme of masculinity in the 20th-century expansion of the term, noting: "The redneck has been stereotyped in the media and popular culture as a poor, dirty, uneducated, and racist Southern white man."

== 19th and early 20th centuries ==
=== Political term for poor farmers ===
The term originally characterized farmers that had a red neck, caused by sunburn from long hours working in the fields. A citation from 1893 provides a definition as "poorer inhabitants of the rural districts ... men who work in the field, as a matter of course, generally have their skin stained red and burnt by the sun, and especially is this true of the back of their necks". Hats were usually worn and they protected that wearer's head from the sun, but also provided psychological protection by shading the face from close scrutiny. The back of the neck however was more exposed to the sun and allowed closer scrutiny about the person's background in the same way callused working hands could not be easily covered.

By 1900, "rednecks" was in common use to designate the political factions inside the Democratic Party comprising poor white farmers in the South. The same group was also often called the "wool hat boys" (for they opposed the rich men, who wore expensive silk hats). A newspaper notice in Mississippi in August 1891 called on rednecks to rally at the polls at the upcoming primary election:

Primary on the 25th.
And the "rednecks" will be there.
And the "Yaller-heels" will be there, also.
And the "hayseeds" and "gray dillers", they'll be there, too.
And the "subordinates" and "subalterns" will be there to rebuke their slanderers and traducers.
And the men who pay ten, twenty, thirty, etc. etc. per cent on borrowed money will be on hand, and they'll remember it, too.

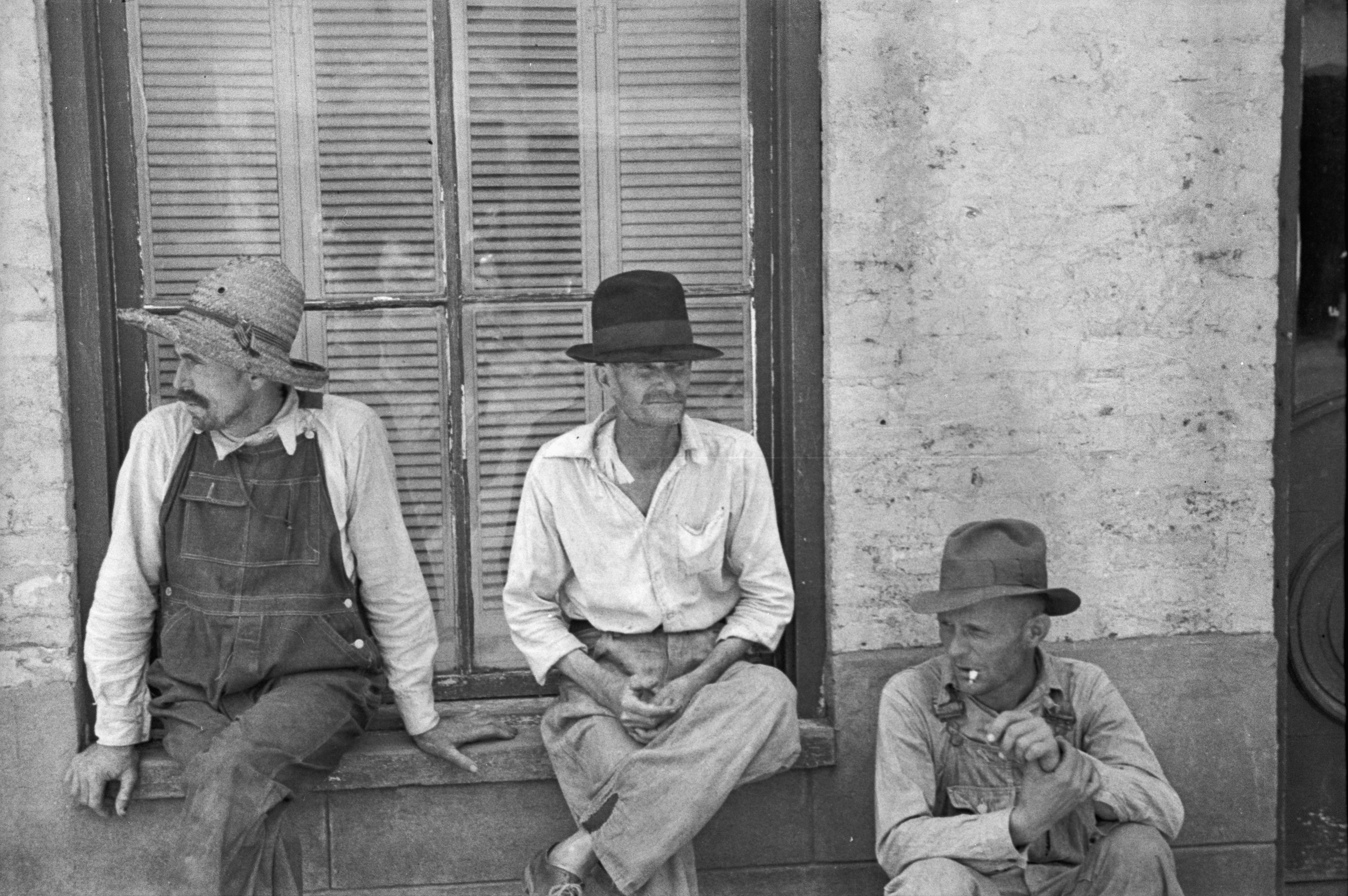
Poor white sharecroppers in Alabama, 1936

By 1910, the political supporters of the Mississippi Democratic Party politician James K. Vardaman—chiefly poor white farmers—began to describe themselves proudly as "rednecks", even to the point of wearing red neckerchiefs to political rallies and picnics.

Linguist Sterling Eisiminger, based on the testimony of informants from the Southern United States, speculated that the prevalence of pellagra in the region during the Great Depression may have contributed to the rise in popularity of the term; red, inflamed skin is one of the first symptoms of that disorder to appear.

=== Coal miners ===
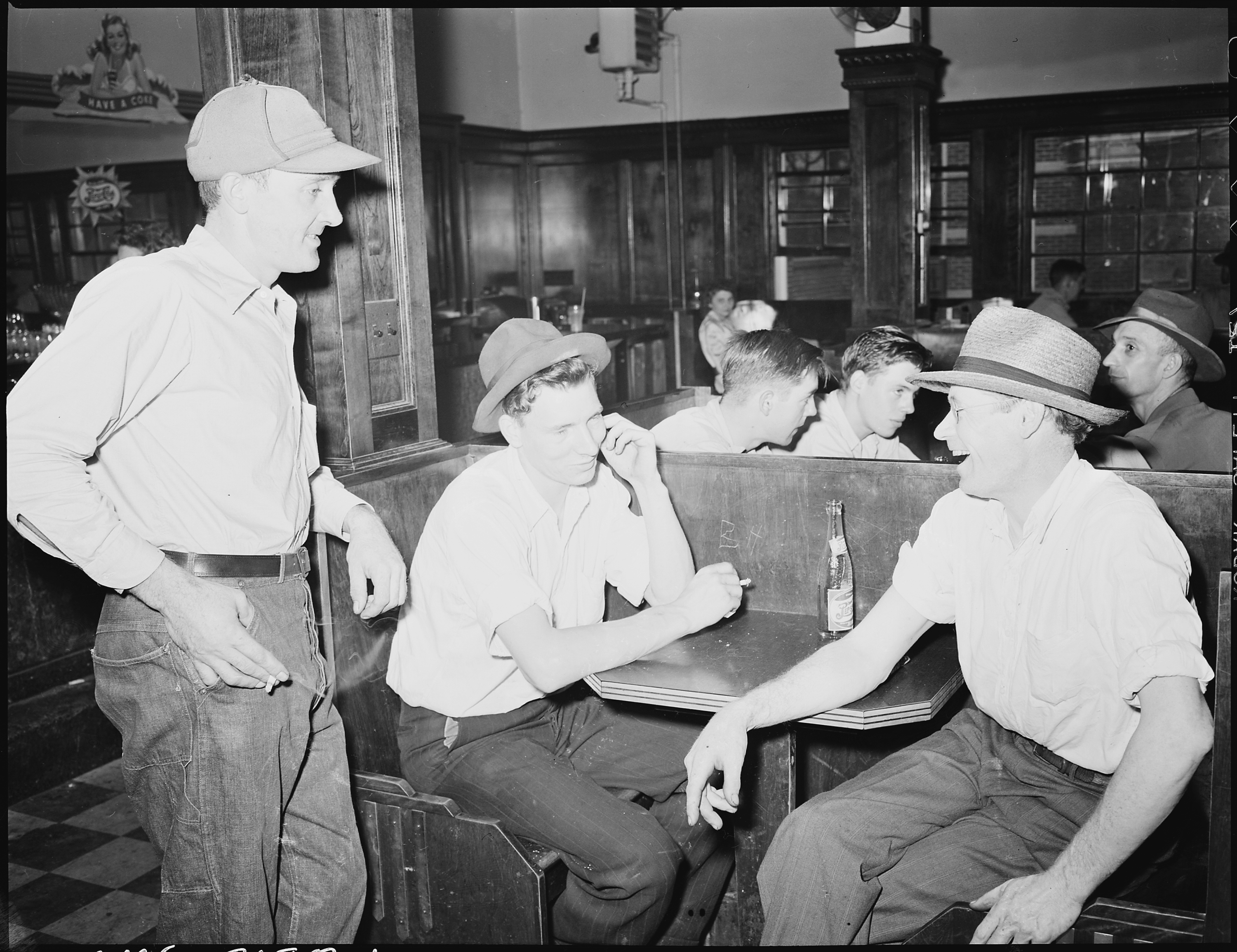
Coal miners in soda fountain, Kentucky, 1946

The term "redneck" in the early 20th century was occasionally used in reference to American coal miner union members who wore red bandanas for solidarity. The sense of "a union man" dates at least to the 1910s and was especially popular during the 1920s and 1930s in the coal-producing regions of West Virginia, Kentucky, and Pennsylvania. It was also used by union strikers to describe poor white strikebreakers.

== Late 20th and early 21st centuries ==
Writers Edward Abbey and Dave Foreman also use "redneck" as a political call to mobilize poor rural white Southerners. "In Defense of the Redneck" was a popular essay by Ed Abbey. One popular early Earth First! bumper sticker was "Rednecks for Wilderness". Murray Bookchin, an urban leftist and social ecologist, objected strongly to Earth First!'s use of the term as "at the very least, insensitive". However, many Southerners have proudly embraced the term as a self-identifier. Similarly to Earth First!'s use, the self-described "anti-racist, pro-gun, pro-labor" group Redneck Revolt have used the term to signal its roots in the rural white working-class and celebration of what member Max Neely described as "redneck culture".

== As political epithet ==
According to Chapman and Kipfer in their "Dictionary of American Slang", by 1975 the term had expanded in meaning beyond the poor Southerner to refer to "a bigoted and conventional person, a loutish ultra-conservative". For example, in 1960 John Bartlow Martin expressed that Senator John F. Kennedy should not enter the Indiana Democratic presidential primary because the state was "redneck conservative country". Indiana, he told Kennedy, was a state "suspicious of foreign entanglements, conservative in fiscal policy, and with a strong overlay of Southern segregationist sentiment". Writer William Safire observed that it is often used to attack white Southern conservatives, and more broadly to degrade working class and rural whites that are perceived by urban progressives to be insufficiently progressive. At the same time, some white Southerners have reappropriated the word, using it with pride and defiance as a self-identifier.

== In popular culture ==
- Johnny Russell was nominated for a Grammy Award in 1973 for his recording of "Rednecks, White Socks and Blue Ribbon Beer". Further songs referencing rednecks include "Longhaired Redneck" by David Allan Coe, "Rednecks" by Randy Newman, "Redneck Friend" by Jackson Browne, "Redneck Woman" by Gretchen Wilson, "Redneck Yacht Club" by Craig Morgan, "Redneck" by Lamb of God, "Redneck Crazy" by Tyler Farr, "Red Neckin' Love Makin' Night" by Conway Twitty, "Up Against The Wall Redneck Mother" by Jerry Jeff Walker, "Your Redneck Past" by Ben Folds Five, "American Idiot" by Green Day, and "Picture to Burn" by Taylor Swift.
- Comedian Jeff Foxworthy's 1993 comedy album You Might Be a Redneck If... cajoled listeners to evaluate their own behavior in the context of stereotypical redneck behavior.
- The Swedish band Rednex adopted the name as a misspelling of "rednecks."

== Outside the United States ==
=== Historical Scottish Covenanter usage ===
In Scotland in the 1640s, the Covenanters rejected rule by bishops, often signing manifestos using their own blood. Some wore red cloth around their neck to signify their position, and were called rednecks by the Scottish ruling class to denote that they were the rebels in what came to be known as The Bishop's War that preceded the rise of Cromwell. Eventually, the term began to mean simply "Presbyterian", especially in communities along the Scottish border. Because of the large number of Scottish immigrants in the pre-revolutionary American South, some historians have suggested that this may be the origin of the term in the United States.

Dictionaries document the earliest American citation of the term's use for Presbyterians in 1830, as "a name bestowed upon the Presbyterians of Fayetteville (North Carolina)".

=== South Africa ===
An Afrikaans term which translates literally as "redneck", rooinek, is used as a disparaging term for English South Africans, in reference to their supposed naïveté as later arrivals in the region in failing to protect themselves from the sun.

== See also ==
- Bogan, Australian term
- Chav, British term
- Class discrimination
- Culture of the Southern United States
- Country (identity)
- Çomar, Turkish term
- Florida cracker
- Georgia cracker
- Hillbilly
- List of ethnic slurs
- Old Stock Americans
- Plain Folk of the Old South
- Redlegs – poor whites that live on Barbados and a few other Caribbean islands
- Stereotypes of white Americans
- West Texas Rednecks
- White trash
- Yokel
- Redneck Revolt
