= White trash =

American English pejorative for poor white people, especially in the American South

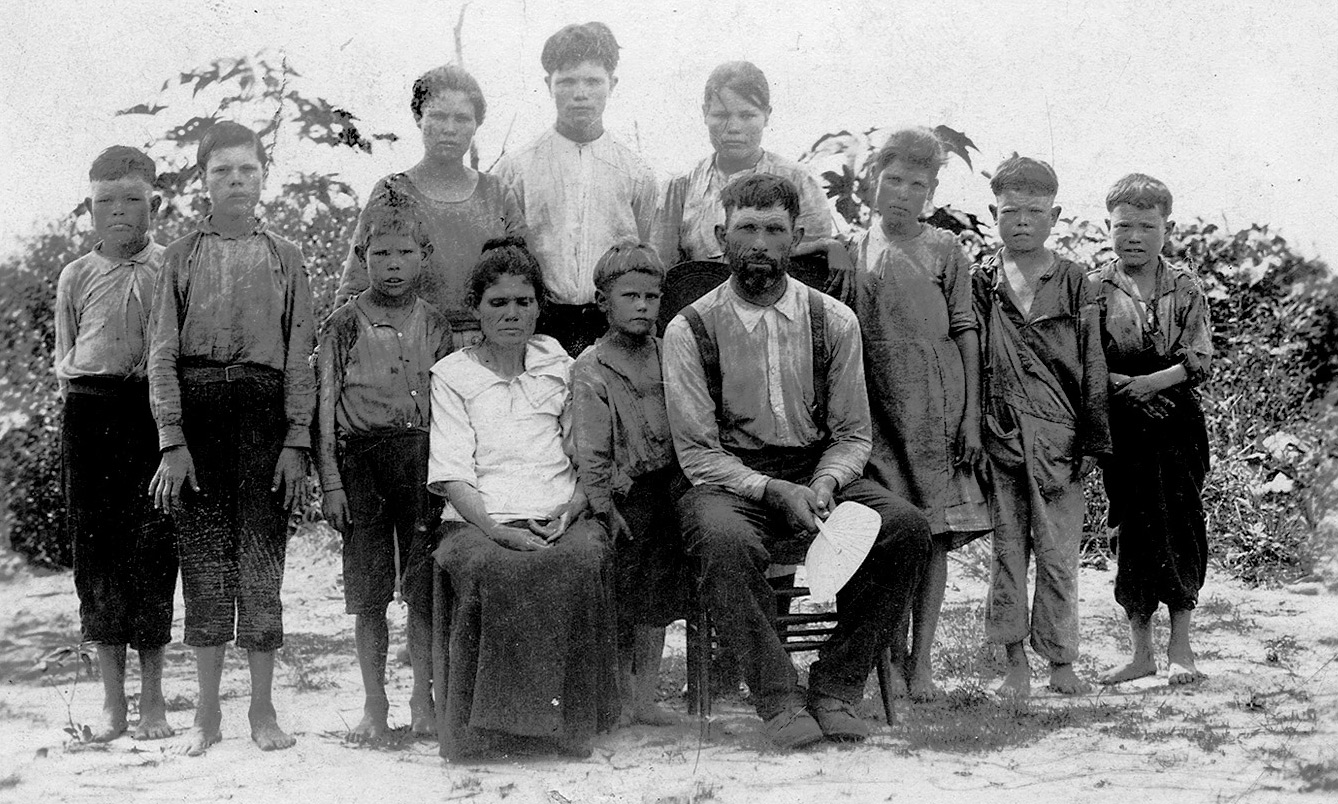
This poor white family from Alabama was presented in 1913 as "celebrities" because they had escaped the debilitating effects of hookworm disease, which, along with pellagra was endemic among poor Southern whites due to poor sanitation and the phenomenon of "clay eating" or "dirt eating" (geophagia).

White trash is a derogatory term in American English for poor white people, especially in the rural areas of the southern United States. The label signifies a social class within the white population, especially those perceived to have a degraded standard of living. It is used as a way to separate the "good poor", who are "noble and hardworking", from the "bad poor", who are deemed “lazy, undisciplined, ungrateful and disgusting". The use of the term provides middle- and upper-class whites a means of distancing themselves from the social status of poor whites, who cannot enjoy the same class privileges, as well as a way to disown their perceived behavior.

The term has been adopted for white people living on the fringes of society, who are seen as dangerous because they may be criminal, unpredictable, and without respect for political, legal, or moral authority. While the term is mostly used pejoratively by urban and middle-class whites as a class signifier, some white entertainers self-identify as "white trash", considering it a badge of honor, and celebrate the stereotypes and social marginalization of lower-class whiteness.

In common usage, "white trash" overlaps in meaning with "cracker", used for people in the backcountry of the Southern states; "hillbilly", for poor people from Appalachia; "Okie" for those with origins in Oklahoma; "Hoosier" used in St. Louis to mean "poor, rural, white trash"; and "redneck", for those with rural origins, especially from the South. The primary difference is that "redneck", "cracker", "Okie", and "hillbilly" emphasize that a person is poor and uneducated and comes from the backwoods with little awareness of and interaction with the modern world, while "white trash" – and the modern term "trailer trash" – emphasizes the person's supposed moral failings, without regard to their upbringing. While the other terms suggest rural origins, "white trash" and "trailer trash" may be urban or suburban as well.

Scholars from the late 19th to the early 21st century explored generations of families who were considered "disreputable", such as the Jukes family and the Kallikak family, both pseudonyms for real families.

== Terminology ==
The expression "white trash" probably originated in the slang used by enslaved African Americans, in the early decades of the 1800s, and was quickly adopted by richer white people who used the term to stigmatize and separate themselves from the kind of whites they historically considered inferior and without honor, such as "menials, swineherds, peddlers and beggars".

"Poor white trash" signifies the "bad poor", in contrast with the "good poor" who were romanticized as "noble and hardworking". One word applied to such people was "tackeys" or "tackies". There may have been an intermediate time when it was used to describe those who may have been wealthy but had no family roots or good breeding. It now generally refers to anything that is cheap, shoddy, gaudy, seedy, or in bad taste.

Academic Jacqueline Zara Wilson suggests the term is partly rooted in the British class system, brought to North America by British settlers, which tended to privilege English settlers over their Scottish, Welsh and Irish counterparts. Wilson describes hierarchies within this framework, such as early Scots-Irish (Presbyterian) immigrants who saw themselves as better than later Irish (Catholic) immigrants.

In her book White Trash, Nancy Isenberg argues that the British saw the American colonies as a "wasteland", and a place to dump their underclass — those people they called "waste people", the "scum and dregs" of society. The early term "waste people" gave way to "squatters" and "crackers", used to describe the settlers who populated the Western frontier of the United States and the backcountry of some southern states, but who did not have title to the land they settled on, and had little or no access to education or religious training. "Cracker" was especially used in the South.

Isenberg also lists other derisive names that have been used to refer to poor whites:

Waste people. Offscourings. Lubbers. Bogtrotters. Rascals. Rubbish. Squatters. Crackers. Clay-eaters. Tuckies. Mudsills. Scalawags. Briar hoppers. Hillbillies. Low-downers. White niggers. Degenerates. White trash. Rednecks. Trailer trash. Swamp people.

=== As a racial epithet ===
Writing in the journal Critique of Anthropology, Jacqueline Zara Wilson suggests the term is a "form of invisible racism" which implicitly blames poor whites for their own circumstances. She says that, when used by whites in particular, it "declares the accused to be poor and in one way or another un-civilized, without the excuse of being racially oppressed". She writes that this may be distinct from the way it was historically used by people of color as "an implicitly anti-racist judgement" or a "vengeful" racialized insult against those who were oppressing them, and that its use reveals hierarchies within whiteness itself.

Journalist Annalee Newitz and sociologist Matt Wray state that "white trash" is both a classist slur and a "racial epithet" that casts poor whites as "a dysgenic race unto themselves".

== Society and culture ==
=== Economic status ===
Many poor whites in the 19th century South were only able to locate themselves on the worst possible land available to whites, since the best land had already been taken by the white slaveholders, large (such as the large-scale plantations owned by the planter class) and small. They lived and attempted to survive on ground that was sandy, swampy or covered in scrub pine and not suited for agriculture; for this, some became known as "sandhillers" and "pineys". These "hard-scratch" inhabitants were seen to match their surroundings: they were "stony, stumpy, and shrubby, as the land they lived on". Many ended up in the mountains, at the time the first frontier of the country. After the Civil War, these people began to be referred to as "hillbillies".

In the popular imagination of the mid-19th century, "poor white trash" were a "curious" breed of degenerate, gaunt, haggard people who suffered from numerous physical and social defects. They were seen as dirty, ragged, emaciated, and disgusting, and had feeble children with distended abdomens who were wrinkled and withered beyond their physical years, so that even 10-year-olds' "countenances are stupid and heavy and they often become dropsical and loathsome to sight", according to a New Hampshire schoolteacher. The skin of a poor white Southerner was described as waxy, "ghastly yellowish-white" like old parchment, or so white they almost appeared to be albinos. The parents were listless and slothful, neglected their children, and were alcoholics. They were looked on with contempt by both upper-class planters and yeoman farmers – the non-slave-owning smallholders.

Harriet Beecher Stowe described a white trash woman and her children in Dred: A Tale of the Great Dismal Swamp, published in 1856:

Crouched on a pile of dirty straw, sat a miserable haggard woman, with large, wild eyes, sunken cheeks, disheveled matted hair, and long, lean hands, like a bird's claws. At her skinny breast an emaciated infant was hanging, pushing, with its little skeleton hands, as if to force nourishment which nature no longer gave; and two scared-looking children, with features wasted and pinched blue with famine, were clinging to her gown. The whole group huddled together, drawing as far away as possible from the new comer [sic], looking up with large, frightened eyes, like hunted wild animals.

White Southerners of the period equated coarse and disagreeable appearances with immoral thoughts and uncivil or criminal behavior – an evil countenance often meant a villainous character. In this way poor whites with unhealthy or ugly bodies – the result in large part of poor diets, lack of personal grooming, and a toxic environment – were condemned by the larger white community at first sight, with no thought given to investigating or ameliorating the conditions that were responsible for their appearances.

The physical characteristics of white trash were thought to be inherited in nature, serving to separate poor whites from the Southern gentility and those yeomen who shared patrician values. Slavery apologist Daniel R. Hundley's 1860 book Social Relations in Our Southern States includes a chapter entitled "White Trash". He used the existence of poor whites with supposed "bad blood" to argue that genetics and not societal structure was the problem, and that therefore slavery was justified. He called white trash the "laziest two-legged animals that walk erect on the face of the Earth", describing their appearance as "lank, lean, angular, and bony, with ... sallow complexion, awkward manners, and a natural stupidity or dullness of intellect that almost surpasses belief". Hundley considered the white trash population to be morally inferior not only to other whites, but to the black slave population as well. His evaluation was seconded by Randolph Shotwell, a future Ku Klux Klan leader, who described them as "a distinct race of people ... thriftless, uneducated, unthinking beings, who live little better than negroes".

W. J. Cash in The Mind of the South (1941) writes in his description of the mythical Old South that beneath the aristocratic Cavalier planters was perceived to be:

...a vague race lumped together indiscriminately as the poor whites – very often, in fact, as the "white-trash". These people belong in the main to a physically inferior type, having sprung for the most part from the convict servants, redemptioners, and debtors of old Virginia and Georgia, with a sprinkling of the most unsuccessful sort of European peasants and farm laborers and the dregs of the European town slums. And so, of course, the gulf between them and the master class was impassable, and their ideas and feeling did not enter into the make-up of the prevailing Southern civilization.

Cash goes on to explain that those who arrived in the New World under these circumstances – at least early in the history of European settlement – were as likely to end up in the planter class or as yeoman farmers as they were to become poor whites, as land, at first, was cheap and available, and hard work could pay off in a rise in economic and social status. But there were some who did not succeed,

...the weakest element of the old backcountry population ... those who had been driven back [by the plantation system] to the red hills and the sandlands and the pine barrens and the swamps – to all the marginal lands of the South; those who, because of the poorness of the soil on which they dwelt or the great inaccessibility of markets, were, as a group, completely barred from escape or economic and social advance. They were the people to whom the term "cracker" properly applied – the "white-trash" and "po' bukra" ... [They exhibited] a distinctive physical character – a striking lankness of frame and slackness of muscle in association with a shambling gait, a boniness and misshapeness of head and feature, a peculiar swallow swartness, or alternatively a not less peculiar and a not less faded-out colorness of skin and hair.

According to Cash, this physical appearance is not, for the most part, genetically determined, but is the result of the brutal circumstances in which this group had to survive.

=== Cultural traditions ===
==== Child rearing ====
By Wyatt-Brown's account, in the mid-19th century South, even upper-class parents were extremely indulgent of their children, encouraging both boys and girls to be aggressive. They soon learned that they were expected to grab for what they wanted, wrestle with their siblings in front of their parents, disobey parental orders, make a racket with their toys, and physically attack visitors. Patrician girls would later be taught to be proper young ladies, but boys continued to be unrestrained, lest they become effeminate. These behaviors – which were also practiced by poorer whites to the extent their circumstances allowed – propelled young men into gambling, drinking, whoring and fighting, all of which was more or less expected as "manly" behavior. This pattern of child-rearing was predominate in the backwoods, where it was not limited to the upper class, but could be found among yeoman and poor whites alike. For white trash, this method of raising children was combined with violent folkways inherited from their English, Irish, and Scottish progenitors. (Note: According to Grady McWhiney in Cracker Culture: Celtic Ways in the Old South, the majority of immigrants to the South in the 1800s came from Wales, Ireland, and Scotland, with those from Scotland coming in waves after every unsuccessful rebellion there. The immigrants were emotionally-driven lower-class "crackers" who maintained archaic clan structures, did not follow the Protestant work ethic, valued comfort and hospitality, and had a sense of personal, familial, and clan honor that was easily provoked. While some of these immigrants were able to enter the Southern planter aristocracy, bringing their characteristics to the "cavaliers" in it, many were not able to elevate themselves and blended into the mass of poor Southern whites; thus these characteristics can also be found in that group.)

==== Proximity to Blacks and Native Americans ====
According to Wyatt-Brown, the Southern style of child-rearing was seen as paralleling that of the Native Americans who were a constant presence in post-colonial America, especially in the backwoods areas. Accordingly, another theory for the existence of white trash held that the degraded condition of poor white southerners was the result of living in close proximity to blacks and Native Americans. Samuel Stanhope Smith, a minister and educator who was the seventh president of Princeton College, wrote in 1810 that poor white southerners lived in "a state of absolute savagism", which caused them to resemble Indians in the color of their skin and their clothing, a belief that was endemic in the 18th and early 19th century. Smith saw them as a stumbling block in the evolution of mainstream American whites, a view that had previously been expressed by J. Hector St. John de Crèvecœur in his 1782 book, Letters from an American Farmer. Crèvecœur, a French soldier-diplomat who resettled in the United States, considered poor white southerners to be "not ... a very pleasing spectacle" and inferior to the prototypical American he celebrated in his book, but still hoped that the effects of progress would improve the condition of these people whom he considered "the most hideous parts of our society".

==== Celtic heritage ====
The Brandeis University historian David Hackett Fischer says there is an enduring genetic basis for a "willingness to resort to violence" – citing especially the finding of high blood levels of testosterone – in the four main chapters of his book Albion's Seed. He proposes that a propensity for violence in the Mid-Atlantic, Southern and Western states is due to genetic changes wrought over generations living in traditional herding societies in Northern England, the Scottish Borders, and Irish Border Region, which were then transferred to other ethnic groups by shared culture. (Note: In Attack and Die: Civil War Military Tactics and Southern Heritage, Grady McWhiney and Perry D. Jamiesen analyze the military behavior of the Confederate Army by comparing it to that of the Celts of Europe and the British Isles, and conclude that the Confederate's over-aggressiveness coupled with a lack of tenacity, among other characteristics, is well-aligned with Celtic battle behavior throughout history. They believe that the Celtic-ness of the South was one of the factors which contributed to its losing the Civil War.)

Even before there was any scientific investigation into the roots of the poor white people of the South, social critic H. L. Mencken, in his 1919 essay "Sahara of the Bozart", challenged the prevailing myth at the time that "poor white trash", and most of the South's population, were primarily of Anglo-Saxon stock, suggesting most were Celtic, with lesser elements of French, Spanish, German and African American heritage. (Note: Mencken wrote: "The chief strain down there, I believe, is Celtic rather than Saxon, particularly in the hill country French blood, too, shows itself here and there, and so does Spanish, and so does German. The last-named entered from the northward, by way of the limestone belt just east of the Alleghenies. Again, it is very likely that in some parts of the South a good many of the plebeian whites have more than a trace of Negro blood. Interbreeding under concubinage produced some very light half-breeds at an early day, and no doubt appreciable numbers of them went over into the white race by the simple process of changing their abode.") According to historian Jack Temple Kirby, Mencken was "woefully ignorant of even the basics of southern history", and was a "captive of the tradition that Old South society consisted only of planter aristocrats, slaves, and poor white trash".

==== As a legacy of slavery ====
In his classic study, Democracy in America (1835), French aristocrat Alexis de Tocqueville sees the state of poor white southerners as being one of the effects of the slave system, which made them ignorant, idle, prideful, self-indulgent, and weak. He writes:

From birth, the southern American is invested with a kind of domestic dictatorship ... and the first habit he learns is that of effortless domination ... [which turns] the southern American into a haughty, hasty, irascible, violent man, passionate in his desires and irritated by obstacles. But he is easily discouraged if he fails to succeed at his first attempt.

Poor whites were restricted from holding political office due to property qualifications, and their ability to vote was at the mercy of courts controlled by the slave-holding planters, meaning they had few advocates. Many were tenant farmers or day laborers, while others were forced to live as scavengers, thieves and vagrants, but all were socially ostracized by "proper" white society. Even slaves looked down on them. Despite poor whites being looked down on by both the planters and the yeoman farmers, they held the Blacks of the South in deep contempt. Cash writes that the slave system "bred [in common whites] a savage and ignoble hate for the Negro, which required only opportunity to break forth in relentless ferocity".

==== Roistering among the British working class ====
Poor Southern whites in the 19th century were often casual about male sexual activity outside of marriage, in spite of evangelical revivalism and increasing church discipline. Wyatt-Brown suggests that this was part of a roistering tradition with roots in the class' British origins, and differentiated white trash from both the yeoman class and landed gentry of the plantations, where church proscriptions and social inhibitions held sway, respectively. For poor white women, there was generally a double standard: girls who broke the code of chastity and bore children outside of wedlock were often subject to public humiliation. In some deep mountain backwoods, however, such girls were seen as fertile rather than shameful.

=== Politics ===
Northerners claimed that the existence of white trash was the result of the system of slavery in the South, while Southerners worried that these clearly inferior whites would upset the "natural" class system which held that all whites were superior to all other races, especially blacks. People of both regions expressed concern that if the number of white trash people increased significantly, they would threaten the Jeffersonian ideal of a population of educated white freemen as the basis of a robust American democracy.

For Ralph Waldo Emerson, the mid-19th-century American philosopher and writer, poor people of all kinds – including poor white Southerners – lived in poverty because of traits inherent to their nature. The poor were "carted to America to ditch & to drudge" only "to lie down prematurely to make a spot of greener grass" afterwards. According to Emerson, these people were fated to inhabit the lowest niches of society, and he specifically excluded them from his definition of what an American was. Emerson's "American" was of virile heritage – descended from the Danes, Norsemen, Saxons, and Anglo-Saxons – and was known for "beastly ferocity" and beauty, not shared by the poor white Southerners. Emerson felt New Englanders and northern Americans were superior to the other "races", but also to white Southerners (especially poor ones).

Some, such as Theodore Roosevelt, saw poor "degenerate" whites – as well as the mass of immigrants from southern and eastern Europe – as causing "race suicide", the concept that poor whites and unwanted immigrants would eventually out-procreate and replace those of the dominant and superior (northern European) white "race", to the detriment of the country.

== History ==
In the early 17th century, Virginia Governor Thomas Dale requested more colonists to work in the fields. It was difficult to find local workers, since those wealthy enough to emigrate to the colonies often became landowners instead. In response, King James sent felons and vagrant children (around a hundred of each) to Virginia.

By 1617, the Virginia Company instituted the headright system, bestowing 50 acres of land to anyone who sponsored an indentured worker's passage to the colony. The Plymouth Company followed suit, as did other colonies, including Maryland, Georgia, North Carolina and South Carolina. This helped poorer European workers come to the colonies but it also incentivized planters to sponsor large numbers of workers (and later, enslaved Africans) in exchange for expanding their land rights. Once their indenture was complete, these workers often became landowners themselves, though they were usually given poorer, undeveloped land on the Western frontier. Others were unable to afford their independence and carried on working for planters as free wage laborers.

To meet demand, British gangs sometimes organized kidnappings, paid for by planters and speculators, to increase the numbers shipped overseas — amounting to thousands of unwilling migrants sent to North America by the middle of the century. Political and military prisoners were also sent as indentured servants to the colonies as a result of insurrections in Ireland. Oliver Cromwell sent hundreds of Irish Catholics to British North America during the Irish Confederate Wars (1641–1653).

In 1717, the Parliament of Great Britain passed the Transportation Act to regulate the system of shipping convicts as indentured servants to North America. This had previously operated for about a century under the royal prerogative of mercy, though was open to exploitation. One of the Act's stated aims was to increase the availability of laborers for the colonies. It also allowed the willing transportation of children as young as 15 on eight-year contracts of indenture. In 1720, the Act was amended to allow merchants to be paid for transporting felons. By the time penal transportation ceased during the American Revolutionary War (1775–1783), some 30,000–50,000 people had been transported to the New World under the law.

In total, 300,000 to 400,000 people were shipped to the North American colonies as indentured servants (between 1/2 and 2/3 of all white immigrants), serving up to seven years. While they expanded the populations of the colonies, and enriched the planter class, the systems of headright and indenture also expanded the lower class and the use of chattel slavery.

Many of the poorer whites sent to the Western frontier, as well as those who settled in the backcountry of some southern states, were called "waste people", "squatters" and "crackers". They did not have title to the land they settled on, and had little access to education or religious training, if any. These people – trappers, miners, and small farmers of the backwoods – brought with them the "customs, routines and beliefs" of the old country, including ethics and morality which were adapted to fit their new environment. These included concepts of personal honor and the desire to protect the community, which Wyatt-Brown suggests developed into an abhorrence for race-mixing.

=== Early 19th century ===
The first use of "white trash" in print to describe the Southern poor white population occurred in 1821. It came into common use in the 1830s as a pejorative used by the house slaves of "quality folk" against poor whites. (Note: In 1833, Fanny Kemble, an English actress visiting Georgia, wrote: "The slaves themselves entertain the very highest contempt for white servants, whom they designate as 'poor white trash'.") This term achieved widespread popularity in the 1850s, and by 1855, it had passed into common usage by upper-class whites, and was in common usage among Southerners of all races throughout the rest of the 19th century.

In 1854, Harriet Beecher Stowe wrote that slavery not only produces "degraded, miserable slaves", but also "a poor white population as degraded and brutal as ever existed in any of the most crowded districts of Europe". She said the plantation system forced these whites to struggle for subsistence, becoming an "inconceivably brutal" group resembling "some blind, savage monster, which, when aroused, tramples heedlessly over everything in its way". Beyond economic factors, Stowe traces the existence of this class to the shortage of schools and churches in their communities. In her second novel Dred, Stowe describes the poor white inhabitants of the Great Dismal Swamp, on the border between Virginia and North Carolina, as an ignorant, degenerate, and immoral class of people prone to criminality. Hinton Rowan Helper's incendiary 1857 book The Impending Crisis of the South describes the region's poor Caucasians as a people of lesser physical stature who were oppressed by the effects of slavery and would be driven to extinction by the South's "cesspool of degradation and ignorance". Historian Jeffrey Glossner of the University of Mississippi writes: "While their voices are often unheard, we can gauge the broader importance of their presence through the social, political, and cultural developments of the period."

=== During the Civil War ===
Early in the Civil War, General John C. Frémont, commander of the Union Army's Department of the West, without the prior approval of President Abraham Lincoln emancipated slaves held by Confederates. When Lincoln, concerned that Frémont's action would encourage slave-owning Border States, like Kentucky, to join the Confederacy, ordered Frémont to withdraw his proclamation, Radical Republicans in Congress were distressed. Abolitionist United States Senator Benjamin Wade of Ohio blamed Lincoln's background for his decision, calling the President "poor white trash".

During the War, the Confederacy instituted conscription of all men between the ages of 18 and 35, to raise soldiers for its army – this was later expanded to all men between 17 and 50. There were numerous exemptions, including for any slave-owner with more than 20 slaves, political officeholders, teachers, ministers and clerks, and men who worked in valuable trades. Poor white trash Southerners had little opportunity to avoid the draft, sometimes served as paid substitutes, and were looked down on as cannon fodder. Poor southerners said that it was a "rich man's war", but "a poor man's fight." While upper-class Southern "cavalier" officers were granted frequent furloughs to return home, this was not the case with the ordinary private soldier, which led to an extremely high rate of desertion among this group, who put their families' well-being above the cause of the Confederacy, and thought of themselves as "Conditional Confederates". Deserters harassed soldiers, raided farms and stole food, and sometimes banded together in settlements, such as the "Free State of Jones" (formerly Jones County) in Mississippi. When found, deserters could be executed or humiliated by being put into chains.

Despite the war being fought to protect the right of the Southern elite to own slaves, the planter class was reluctant to give up their cash crop, cotton, to grow the corn and grain needed by the Confederate armies and the civilian population. As a result, food shortages, exacerbated by inflation and hoarding by the rich, caused the poor of the South to suffer greatly. This led to food riots of angry mobs of poor women who raided stores, warehouses, and depots looking for food. Both the male deserters and the female rioters put the lie to the myth of Confederate unity, and that the war was being fought for the rights of all white Southerners.

Ideologically, the Confederacy claimed that the system of slavery in the South was superior to the class divisions of the North, because while the South devolved all its degrading labor onto what it saw as an inferior race, the black slaves, the North did so to its own "brothers in blood", the white working class. The leaders and intellectuals of the Confederacy called this "mudsill" democracy, while they lauded the superiority of the pure-blooded Southern slave-owning "cavaliers" over the sullied Anglo-Saxon upper class of the North. Some of the military leaders of the North, especially Generals Ulysses S. Grant and William Tecumseh Sherman, recognized that their fight was not only to liberate slaves, but also the poor white Southerners, so they took steps to exploit the class divisions between the "white trash" population and plantation owners. An Army chaplain wrote in a letter to his wife after the Union siege of Petersburg, Virginia that the war would "knock off the shackles of millions of poor whites". After the Civil War and his presidency, in 1879 during his world tour, Grant said that he had hoped that the war would have freed the "poor white class" of the South from "a bondage in some respects even worse than slavery", but concluded "they have been as much under the thumb of the slave holder as before the war".

=== During Reconstruction ===
After the war, President Andrew Johnson's first idea for the reconstruction of the South was essentially a "white trash republic", in which the aristocracy would maintain their property holdings and an amount of social power, but be disenfranchised until they could show their loyalty to the Union. The freed blacks would no longer be slaves, but would still be denied essential rights of citizenship and would make up the lowest rung on the social ladder. In between would be the poor white Southerner, who while occupying a lesser social position, would essentially become the masters of the South, voting and occupying political offices, and maintaining a superior status to the free blacks and freed slaves. Emancipated from the inequities of the plantation system, poor white trash would become the bulwark of Johnson's plan to rebuild the South.

Johnson's plan was never put into effect, and the Freedmen's Bureau, created in 1865, was authorized to help "all refugees and all freedmen", black and white alike. The agency did this despite Johnson's basic lack of concern for the freed slaves the war had supposedly been fought over. Even though they provided relief to them, the Bureau did not accept Johnson's vision of poor whites as the loyal and honorable foundation of a reconstructed South. Northern journalists and other observers maintained that poor white trash, who were now destitute, were still victimized by poverty and vagrancy. They were seen as "loafers" dressed in rags and covered in filth who did no work, but accepted government relief. They were seen as only slightly more intelligent than blacks. Cotton merchant and novelist James R. Gilmore, who had traveled throughout the South, differentiated poor whites into two groups: "mean whites" and "common whites". While the former were thieves, loafers, and brutes, the latter were law-abiding citizens who were enterprising and productive. It was the "mean" minority who gave white trash their bad name and character.

A number of commentators noted that poor white Southerners did not compare favorably to freed blacks, who were described as "capable, thrifty, and loyal to the Union". Marcus Sterling, a Freedmen's Bureau agent and a former Union officer, said that the "pitiable class of poor whites" were "the only class which seem almost unaffected by the [bureau's] great benevolence and its bold reform", while in contrast black freedmen had become "more settled, industrious and ambitious". Sidney Andrews saw in blacks a "shrewd instinct for preservation" which poor whites did not have, and Whitelaw Reid, a politician and newspaper editor from Ohio, thought that black children appeared eager to learn. Atlantic Monthly went so far as to suggest that government policy should switch from "disenfranchis[ing] the humble, quiet, hardworking Negro" and cease to provide help to the "worthless barbarian", the "ignorant, illiterate, and vicious" white trash population.

During the Reconstruction Era, white trash were no longer seen as a degenerate breed which lived in the backcountry wilderness, but were brought into the mainstream of society, where they developed the reputation of being a dangerous, unintelligent class of criminals, vagrants and delinquents. They were seen as immoral, engaging in incest and prostitution, pimping out family members, and producing numerous in-bred bastard children.

One of the responses of Southerners and Northern Democrats to Reconstruction was the invention of two myths: the "carpetbaggers" and the "scalawags". The first were those Northern Republicans said to have invaded the South to take advantage of its people; and the second were those Southern whites who "betrayed" their race by supporting the Republican Party and Reconstruction. The scalawag, even if they came from a higher social class, was often described as being "white trash" or having a "white trash heart". They were decried as "Black Republicans", and were accused of easily mingling with blacks, inciting them to seek social equality. Democrats responded with Autobiography of a Scalawag, a parody of the standard "self-made man" story, in which a white trash southerner with no innate ambition is nevertheless raised to a position of middling power just by being in the right place at the right time, or by lying and cheating.

During Reconstruction, the Ku Klux Klan would frequently blame one of its particularly egregious killings or tortures on "poor white trash" with no discipline who did not follow the Klan's high standards of "justice" and "honor".

=== Post-Reconstruction ===
After Reconstruction governments were "Redeemed", and Southern states returned to "local control" – i.e. white supremacist rule – some Southern conservatives in power expressed their desire to "conserve" the Blacks, and many African Americans, having no real alternative, accepted their protection as their best available option. This exposed a class-based fracture in the Southern white population. The aristocratic Governor of South Carolina, ex-Confederate General Wade Hampton III, said that the "better class of whites" approved of this policy, but that "the lower whites are less favorable". A Black member of the Virginia Assembly in 1877 was reported by Democratic politician Jabez Lamar Monroe Curry as saying that "he and his race relied for the protection of their rights & liberties, not on the 'poor white trash' but on the 'well-raised' gentleman". In 1890, the editor of a Black newspaper editorialized that the demand in the South for Jim Crow laws did not come from the "best people of the South", but from the "worst class of whites" in that region.

Around 1890, the term "redneck" began to be widely used for poor white southerners. State legislator Guy Rencher, a self-proclaimed "redneck", claimed the term came from his own "long red neck".

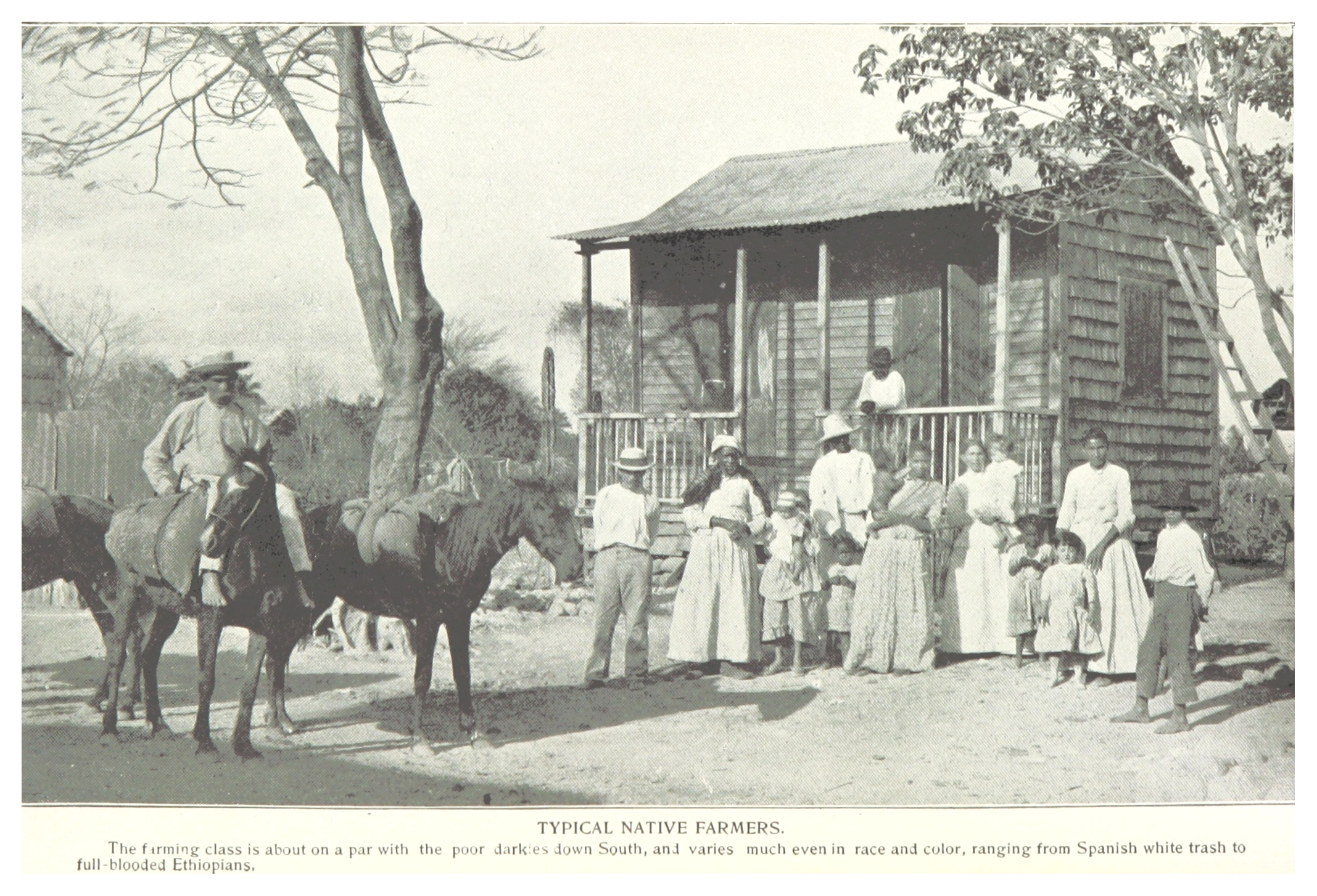
Puerto Rico (c. 1899): "The farming class is about on a par with the poor darkies down South, and varies much even in race and color, ranging from Spanish white trash to full-blooded Ethiopians."

=== The "New South" ===
From the 1890s until the turn of the century, the New South movement introduced industrialization, primarily in the form of hundreds of cotton mills across towns, villages and hamlets with flowing water to power the mill. The poor whites who had not already become sharecroppers or tenant farmers on cotton plantations moved into housing provided by the mills, and every member of the family, down to children as young as 6, worked at the mill, often from before dawn until after dark, for daily wages about half those paid for similar work in the North. Deprived of sunlight, working on badly ventilated mill floors, eating a diet which was no better than they had consumed before becoming industrialized, the mill worker became a notable physical type:

A dead white skin, a sunken chest, and stooping shoulders were the earmarks of the breed. Chinless faces, microcephalic foreheads, rabbit teeth, goggling dead-fish eyes, rickety limbs and stunted bodies abounded – over and beyond the limits of their prevalence in the countryside. The women were characteristically stringy-haired and limp of breast at twenty, and shrunken hags at thirty or forty. And the incidence of tuberculosis, of insanity and epilepsy, and, above all, of pellagra, the curious vitamin-deficiency disease which is nearly peculiar to the South, was increasing.

The societal organization of the mills, in large part located just outside already organized municipal boundaries, was informed by that of the plantations, with the head of the mills replacing the planter as master. The mills provided rented housing and "company stores" where goods could be bought and charged against future earnings, putting the worker in the company's debt. Mills also had churches and schools, where workers paid the wages of the parson and the teacher. These mill workers attracted a new bevy of insulting and disdainful names, such as "lint-heads", "cotton-tails", "factory rats", and "cotton-mill trash".

=== Eugenics ===
Also around 1890, the American eugenics movement turned its attention to poor white trash. They were stigmatized as being feeble-minded and promiscuous, having incestuous and inter-racial sex, and abandoning or mistreating their children. Eugenicists campaigned successfully for laws that would allow poor rural whites to be involuntarily sterilized by the state, in order to "cleanse" society of faulty genetic heritages. In 1907, Indiana passed the first eugenics-based compulsory sterilization law in the world. Thirty U.S. states would soon follow their lead. Although the law was overturned by the Indiana Supreme Court in 1921, in the 1927 case Buck v. Bell, the Supreme Court of the United States upheld the constitutionality of the Virginia Sterilization Act of 1924, allowing for the compulsory sterilization of patients of state mental institutions.

=== The Depression ===
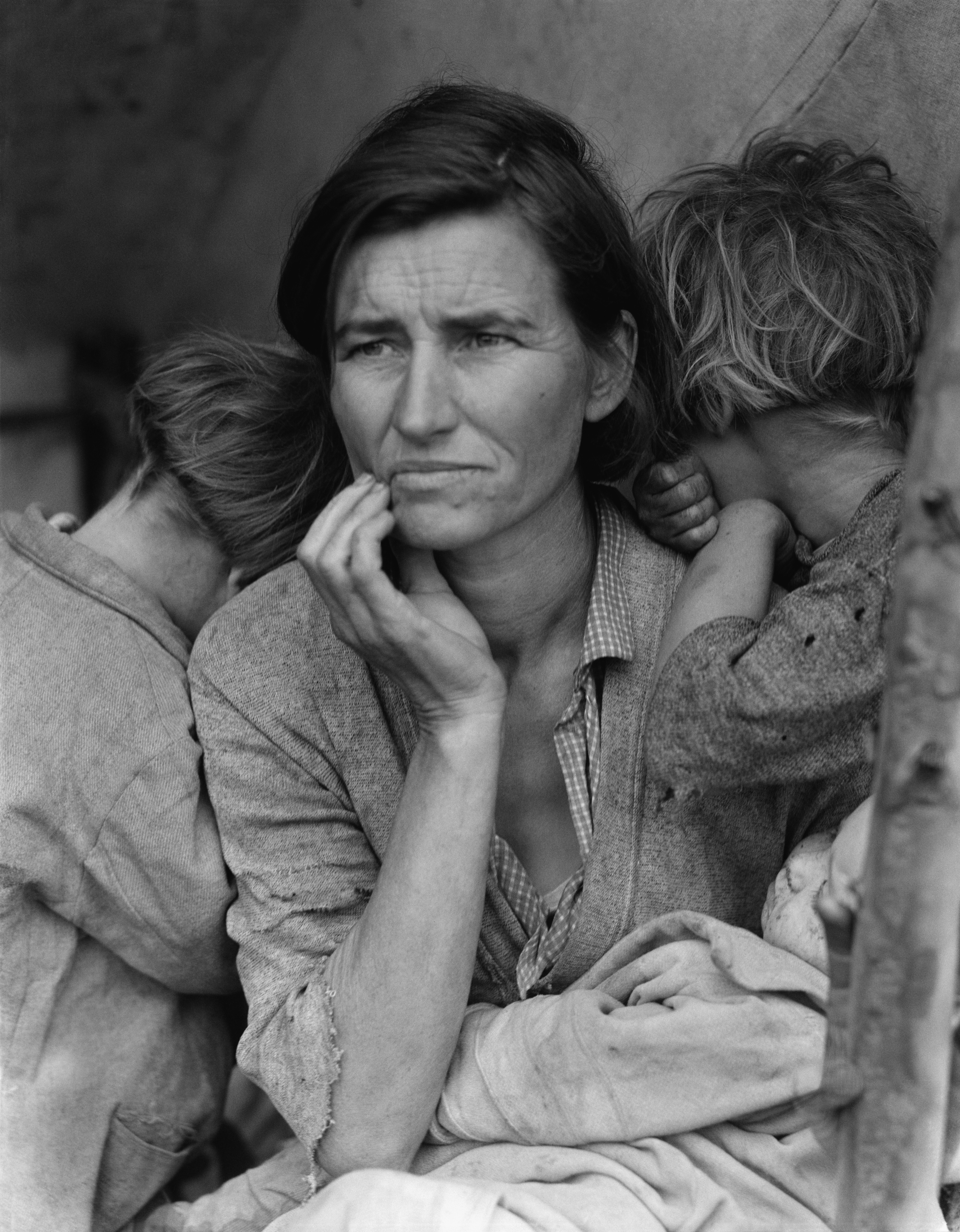
Dorothea Lange's 1936 photograph of Florence Thompson, a migrant worker in California during the Great Depression, along with three of her children. The photo is known as Migrant Mother.

The beginning of the 20th century brought no change of status for poor white southerners, especially after the onset of the Great Depression. The condition of this class was presented to the public in Margaret Bourke-White's photographic series for Life magazine and the work of other photographers made for Roy Stryker's Historical Section of the federal Resettlement Agency. Author James Agee wrote about them in his ground-breaking work Let Us Now Praise Famous Men (1941), as did Jonathan Daniels in A Southerner Discovers the South (1938).

A number of Franklin D. Roosevelt's New Deal agencies tried to help the rural poor to better themselves and to break through the social barriers of Southern society which held them back, reinstating the American Dream of upward mobility. Programs such as those of the Subsistence Homesteads Division of the Department of the Interior; its successor, the Resettlement Administration, whose express purpose was to help the poor in rural areas; and its replacement, the Farm Security Administration which aimed to break the cycle of tenant farming and sharecropping and help poor whites and blacks to own their own farms, and to initiate the creation of the communities necessary to support those farms. The agencies also provided services for migrant workers, such as the Arkies and Okies, who had been devastated by the Dust Bowl and forced to head west toward California, bringing all their belongings by car.

Important in the devising and running of these programs were politicians and bureaucrats such as Henry Wallace, the Secretary of Agriculture; Milburn Lincoln Wilson, the first head of the Subsistence Homesteads Division, who was a social scientist and an agricultural expert; and Rexford G. Tugwell, a Columbia University economics professor appointed as the first head of the Resettlement Agency. Tugwell understood that the status of tenant farmers would not change if they could not vote, so he campaigned against poll tax, which prevented them voting, since they could not afford to pay it. His agency's goals were the four "R's": "retirement of bad land, relocation of rural poor, resettlement of the unemployed in suburban communities, and rehabilitation of farm families".

Arthur Raper, an expert on tenancy farming, published his study Preface to Peasantry (1936), in which he explained why the south's system held back the region's poor and caused them to migrate. Howard Odum, a University of North Carolina sociologist and psychologist, wrote the 600-page Southern Regions of the United States, which became a guidebook for the New Deal. Journalist Gerald W. Johnson translated Odum's ideas in the book into a popular volume, The Wasted Land. In 1938, Odum mailed questionnaires to academics to determine their views on what "poor white" meant to them. The results were similar to the popular views of "white trash" that had been held for many decades, indicating perceived character flaws in poor whites: "purposeless, hand to mouth, lazy, unambitious, no account, no desire to improve themselves, inertia", but, most often, "shiftless".

=== "Trailer trash" ===
Trailers got their start in the 1930s, and their use proliferated during the housing shortage of World War II, when the Federal government used 30,000 of them to house defense workers, soldiers and sailors, especially around areas with a large military or defense presence such as Mobile, Alabama and Pascagoula, Mississippi. Reporter Agnes E. Meyer of The Washington Post travelled throughout the country, reporting on the condition of the "neglected rural areas", and described the people who lived in the trailers, tents, and shacks there as malnourished, illiterate, and ragged. The shipyard workers who came to Mobile and Pascagoula were "subnormal swamp and mountain folk" whom the locals described as "vermin"; elsewhere, they were called "squatters". They were accused of having loose morals, high illegitimacy rates, and of allowing prostitution to thrive in their "Hillbilly Havens". The trailers themselves – sometimes purchased second- or third-hand – were often unsightly, unsanitary, and dilapidated, causing communities to zone them away from more desirable areas which had schools, stores, and other necessary facilities.

In the mid-20th century, poor whites who could not afford suburban-style tract housing began to purchase mobile homes, which were not only cheaper, but which could be easily relocated if work in one location ran out. Through a combination of choice and local zoning laws, these people gathered in trailer camps, and the people who lived in them became known as "trailer trash". Despite many of them having jobs, albeit sometimes itinerant ones, the character flaws perceived in poor white trash were also applied to so-called "trailer trash", and trailer camps or parks were seen as being inhabited by retired persons, migrant workers, and the poor. By 1968, a survey found that only 13% of those who owned and lived in mobile homes had white collar jobs.

== Analysis ==
Sociologist Allyson Drinkard writes in The Social History of the American Family that to be considered "white trash" in modern American society is different from simply being poor and white, because of the images it conjures. Drinkard writes that those called white trash are caught in the paradox of belonging to a supposedly privileged group without being able to benefit from that privilege. Like other oppressed minorities, poor whites are born trapped in poverty, and are blamed for not being able to "raise themselves" out of their predicament, while upper- and middle-class whites solidify their feeling of superiority by making sure that "white trash" people are seen as outsiders.

English professor Nell Sullivan argues that the term "white trash" erases the humanity of poor whites, through the "invisibility that the middle and upper classes demand of the lower economic classes". Isenberg says: "The very existence of such people – both in their visibility and invisibilty – is proof that American society obsesses over the mutable labels we give to the neighbors we wish not to notice."

== In popular culture ==
=== White popular culture ===
- In 1900, Evelyn Greenleaf Sutherland's play Po' White Trash, explored the complicated cultural tensions and social and racial status of poor whites in the post-Reconstruction South.
- In O Henry's short story "Shoes" (c.1907), the Alabamian protagonist, John De Graffenreid Atwood refers to a former adversary, Pink Dawson, as "poor white trash". * George Bernard Shaw uses the term in his 1909 play The Shewing-Up of Blanco Posnet, set in the wild American west. The prostitute Feemy calls Blanco "white trash."
- Ernest Matthew Mickler's White Trash Cooking (1986), based on the cooking of rural white Southerners, enjoyed an unanticipated rise to popularity. Sherrie A. Inness writes that authors such as Mickler use humor to convey the experience of living on the margins of white society, and to expand the definition of American culinary history beyond upper-class traditions based on European cooking.
- By the 1980s, fiction was being published by Southern authors who identified as having redneck or white trash origins, such as Harry Crews, Dorothy Allison, Larry Brown, and Tim McLaurin.
- Autobiographies sometimes mention white trash origins. Gay rights activist Amber L. Hollibaugh wrote: "I grew up a mixed-race, white-trash girl in a country that considered me dangerous, corrupt, fascinating, exotic. I responded to the challenge by becoming that alarming, hazardous, sexually disruptive woman."
- Dolly Parton regularly referred to herself as white trash telling Southern Living

White trash! I am. People always say, 'Aren't you insulted when people call you white trash?' I say, 'Well it depends on who's calling me white trash and how they mean it.' But we really were, to some degree. Because when you're that poor and you're not educated, you fall in those categories.

Talking about her fame, Parton said "There’s nothing like white trash at the White House!" She cheerfully told Rolling Stone she will always remain "a white-trash person".

- President Jimmy Carter quoted a supporter who called him "white trash made good". In his 2001 biography An Hour Before Daylight: Memories of a Rural Boyhood, Carter wrote about poor white people in the 1920s and 1930s rural Georgia "For those who were lazy or dishonest, or had repulsive personal habits, 'white trash' was a greater insult than any epithet based on race." People magazine lampooned a book on Carter as a "Southern white trash novel".
- In 2006, country music star Toby Keith released an album called White Trash with Money, which reached platinum sales levels.
- An, earlier example of self-identification is the 1969 song "Fancy" which was written and recorded by singer Bobbie Gentry. In the song, which was in part inspired by Gentry's own life, Gentry describes the narrator's impoverished childhood as having been "born just plain white trash", a beginning which leads her into prostitution to escape from the cycle of poverty.
- American pop culture connects being rural "white trash" man to drinking and violence.

=== Black popular culture ===
- Use of "white trash" epithets has been extensively reported in African-American culture and folklore. As an example, enslaved blacks would, when out of earshot, refer to harsh slave owners as "lower than poor white trash". Some black authors have noted that blacks, when taunted by whites as "niggers", taunted back, calling them "white trash".
- Zora Neale Hurston's Seraph on the Suwanee (1948) explored images of "white trash" women. In 2000, Chuck Jackson argued in the African American Review that Hurston critiques the eugenics discourses of the 1920s.

== See also ==
- List of ethnic slurs
- Chav
- Classism
- Clay eater
- Cracker
  - Florida cracker
  - Georgia cracker

- Eurotrash (term)
- Hillbilly
- Lace curtain and shanty Irish
- Okie
- Peckerwood
- Poor White
- Redneck

- Scalawag
- Stereotypes of white people in the United States
- Trailer trash
- Underclass
- Whiteness studies
- Yokel
