= Stuff White People Like =

Satirical Blog

Christian Lander
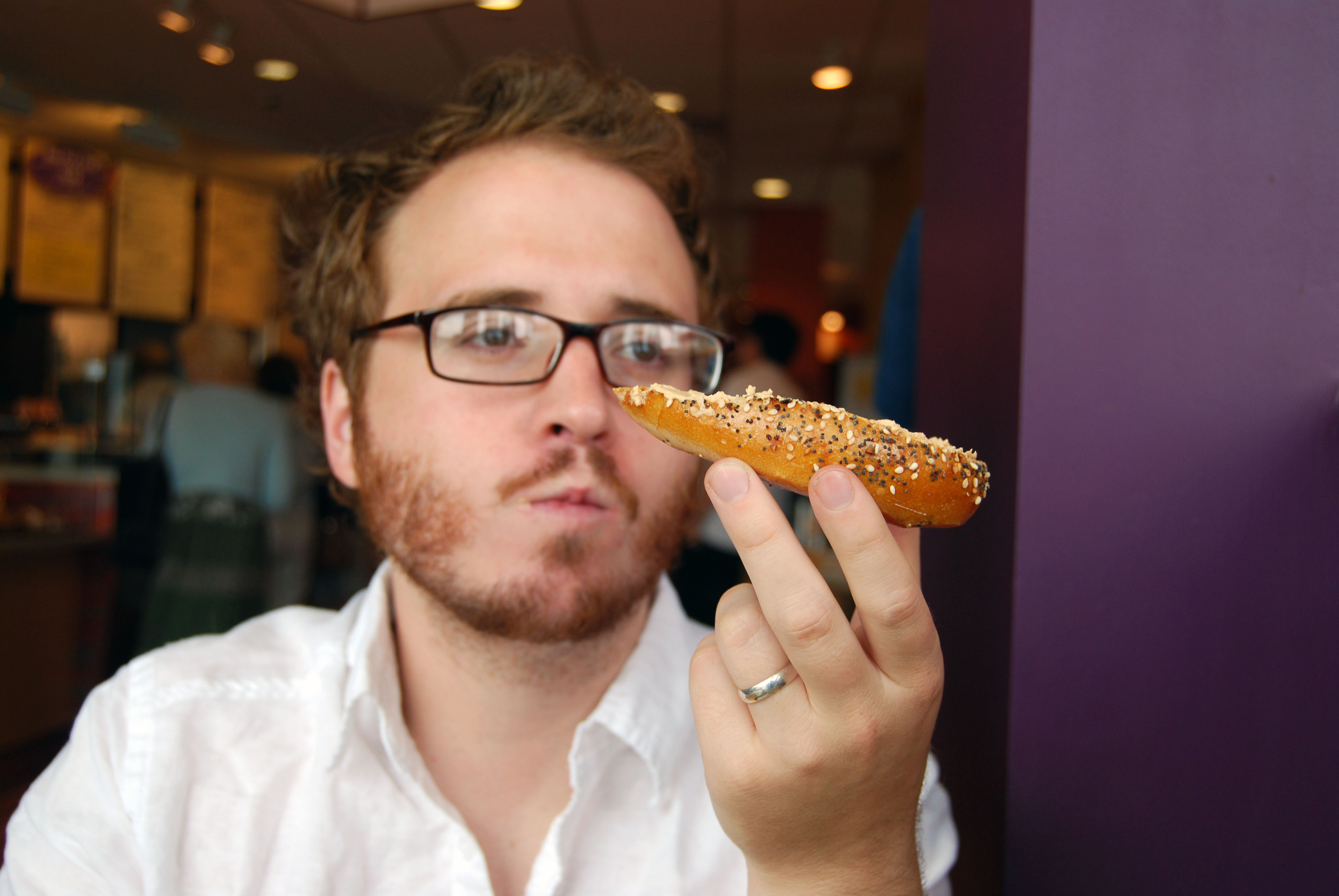
- Author Christian Lander eating an everything bagel in Mar Vista, Los Angeles, California in 2008
- Born: September 12, 1978 (age 47); Toronto, Ontario, Canada
- Spouse: Jess Lander

Stuff White People Like (sometimes known by the initialism SWPL) was a blog that took a satirical aim at the interests of North American "left-leaning, city-dwelling, white people". The blog was created in January 2008 by a white Canadian, Christian Lander, a Los Angeles copywriter who grew up in Toronto and graduated from McGill University in Montreal. Lander co-authored the site with his Filipino Canadian friend Myles Valentin, after Valentin teased Lander for watching the HBO television series The Wire. Lander's blog became popular very quickly, registering over 300,000 daily hits and over 40 million total hits by the end of September 2008. It has not been updated since 2010.

== Summary ==
Although the blog "spurred an outpouring from those who view it as offensive and racist", it was not about the interests of all white people, but rather a stereotype of affluent, environmentally and socially conscious, anti-corporate white North Americans, who typically hold a degree in the liberal arts. Lander claimed to be lampooning contemporary versions of bohemian/hipster culture, and jokingly referred to other classes and subcultures of white people as "the wrong kind of white people". Despite the site's satirical edge, Lander regarded the people he described with affection and numbered himself among them, describing himself as "a self-aware, left-wing person who's not afraid to recognize the selfishness and contradictions that come on the left". The initialism "SWPL" has been adopted in some circles as a (usually pejorative) shorthand term for the type of people depicted on the blog.

== Publication ==
A book (Stuff White People Like: A Definitive Guide to the Unique Taste of Millions) was released on July 1, 2008. Lander is listed as the sole author of the book, although some of its content comes from the blog posts written by Valentin. The book remained on The New York Times bestseller list for months. Lander was reportedly given a $300,000 advance by Random House, the book's publisher. He released a sequel (Whiter Shades of Pale: The Stuff White People Like, Coast to Coast from Seattle's Sweaters to Maine's Microbrews) on November 23, 2010.

== See also ==
- Stereotypes of white Americans
- White Fragility
