= Tiger Stadium (Detroit) =

American multi-use stadium (1912–2009)

- "The Corner"
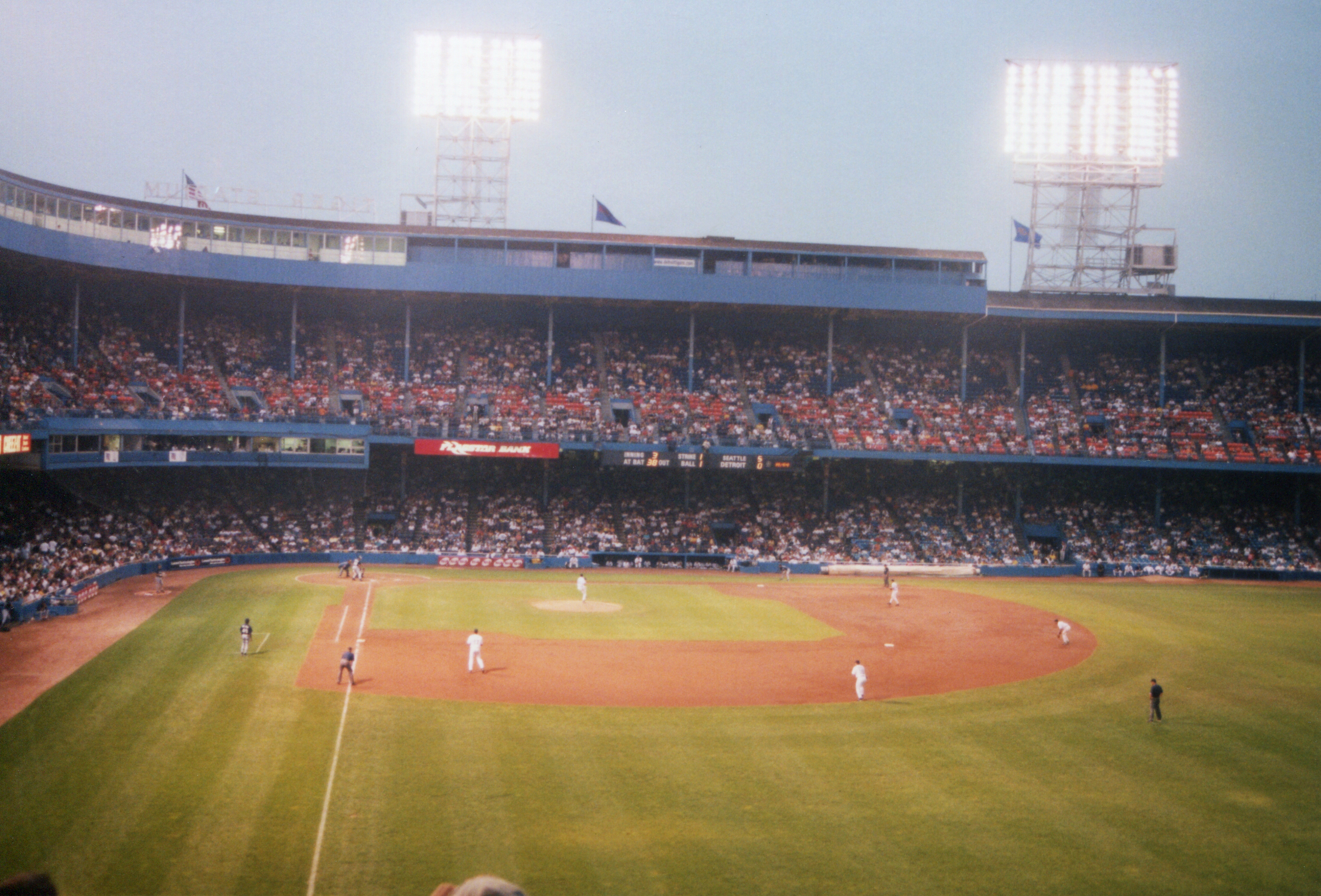
- Tiger Stadium in 1998
- Interactive map of Tiger Stadium
- Former names: Navin Field (1912–1937); Briggs Stadium (1938–1960)
- Address: 2121 Trumbull Avenue; Detroit, Michigan, U.S.
- Coordinates: 42°19′55″N 83°4′8″W
- Owner: Detroit Tigers (1912–1977); City of Detroit (1977–2009)
- Operator: Detroit Tigers
- Capacity: 23,000 (1912); 30,000 (1923); 52,416 (1937)
- Surface: Bluegrass
- Field size: Left field – 340 ft (104 m); Left-center field – 365 ft (111 m); Center field – 440 ft (134 m); Right-center field – 370 ft (113 m); Right field – 325 ft (99 m); Backstop – 66 ft (20 m)

Construction
- Groundbreaking: October 1911
- Opened: April 20, 1912
- Closed: July 24, 2001
- Demolished: June 30, 2008 (began); September 21, 2009 (completed)
- Cost: US$300,000 ($10 million in 2025 dollars)
- Architect: Osborn Engineering Company
- General contractors: Hunkin & Conkey

Tenants
- Detroit Tigers (MLB) 1912–1999; Detroit Heralds (OL) 1912–1919 Detroit Heralds/Tigers (APFA) 1920–1921; Detroit Panthers (NFL) 1925–1926; Detroit Lions (NFL) 1938–1939, 1941–1974; Detroit Cougars (NPSL / NASL) 1967–1968
- Tiger Stadium
- Formerly listed on the U.S. National Register of Historic Places
- Michigan State Historic Site
- NRHP reference No.: 88003236

Significant dates
- Added to NRHP: February 6, 1989
- Removed from NRHP: September 1, 2022

Tiger Stadium, previously known as Navin Field and Briggs Stadium, was a multi-use stadium located in the Corktown neighborhood of Detroit, Michigan, United States. The stadium was nicknamed "The Corner" for its location at the intersection of Michigan and Trumbull Avenues. It hosted the Detroit Tigers of Major League Baseball (MLB) from 1912 to 1999, as well as the Detroit Lions of the National Football League (NFL) from 1938 to 1939, 1941 to 1974. Tiger Stadium was declared a State of Michigan Historic Site in 1975 and was listed on the National Register of Historic Places in 1989.

The last Tigers game at the stadium was held in September 1999. In the decade after the Tigers vacated the stadium, several rejected redevelopment and preservation efforts finally gave way to the stadium's demolition, which was completed in September 2009. The former playing field remained until 2018, when the site was redeveloped for youth sports as the Corner Ballpark.

== History ==
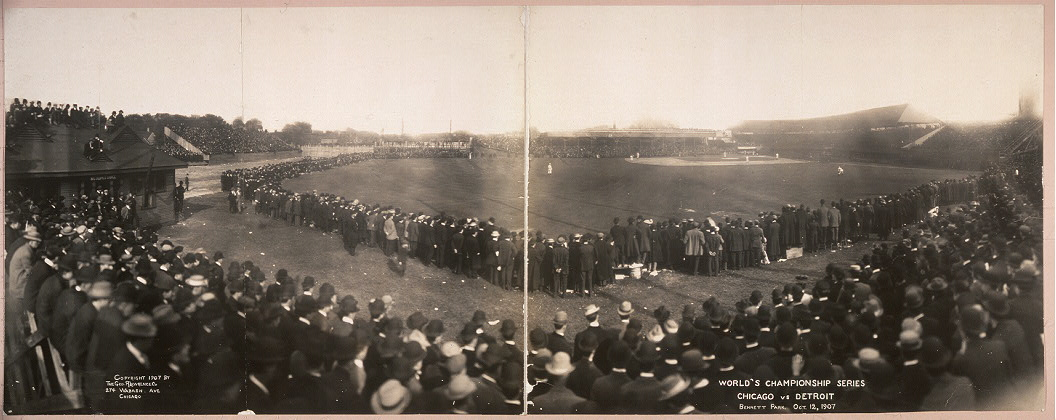
Bennett Park on October 12, 1907, during a World Series game between the Detroit Tigers and Chicago Cubs

=== Origins ===
In 1895, Detroit Tigers owner George Vanderbeck had a new stadium built at the corner of Michigan and Trumbull avenues. That stadium was called Bennett Park and featured a wooden grandstand with a wooden peaked roof in the outfield. At the time, some places in the outfield were only marked off with rope.

In 1911, new Tigers owner Frank Navin ordered a new steel-and-concrete baseball park to be built on the same site that would seat 23,000 to accommodate the growing numbers of fans. Navin Field opened on April 20, 1912, the same day as Fenway Park in Boston. While constructed on the same site as Bennett Park, the diamond at Navin Field was rotated 90°, with home plate located in what had been left field at Bennett Park. Cleveland Naps player "Shoeless" Joe Jackson scored the first run at Navin Field.

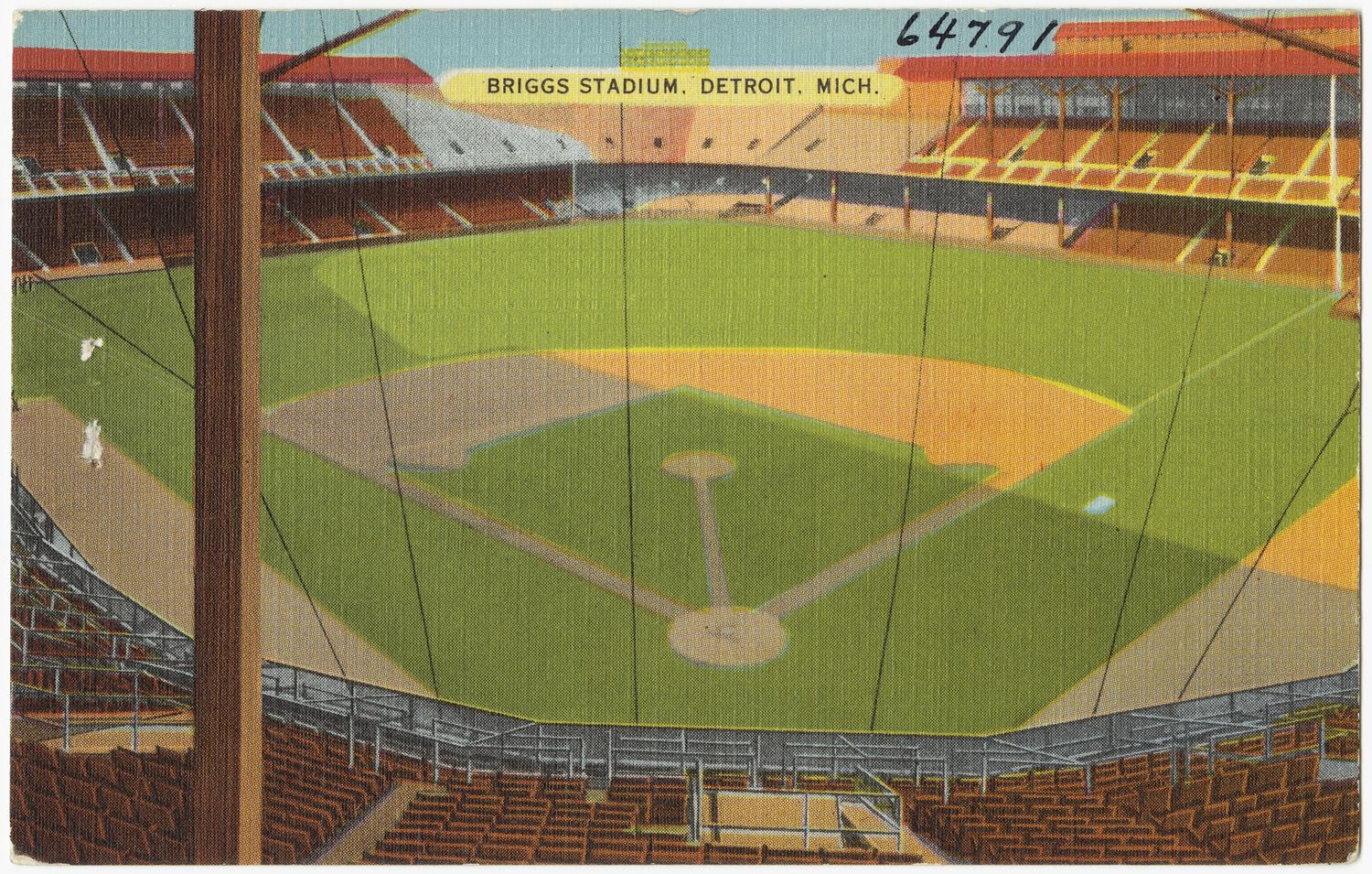
Postcard showing Briggs Stadium, circa 1938–1945

Over the years, expansion continued to accommodate more spectators. In 1935, following Navin's death, new owner Walter Briggs Sr. oversaw the expansion of Navin Field to a capacity of 36,000 by extending the upper deck to the foul poles and across right field. By 1938, the city had agreed to move Cherry Street, allowing the left-field seats to be double-decked, and the now-renamed Briggs Stadium had a capacity of 53,000.

In 1961, new owner John Fetzer took control of the stadium and gave it its final and longest-lasting name: Tiger Stadium. By the early 1970s, city officials began pursuing plans to replace the stadium. In January 1972, the Tigers announced their intention to play at a proposed multi-purpose domed stadium on the riverfront. However, Wayne County officials objected over the financial plan, which led to the matter going all the way to the Michigan Supreme Court, who ruled that it was unconstitutional in June of the same year.

A fire gutted the press box on the evening of February 1, 1977. In the same year, the Tigers sold the stadium to the city of Detroit, which then leased it back to the Tigers. As part of this transfer, the green wooden seats were replaced with blue and orange plastic ones, and the stadium's interior, which was green, was painted blue to match.

By the early 1990s, it was clear that Tiger Stadium was at the end of its useful life. Both the city and Tigers ownership wanted a new park, but many campaigned to save the old stadium. While a plan to modify and maintain Tiger Stadium as the home of the Tigers, known as the Cochrane Plan, was supported by many in the community, it was never seriously considered by the city or the Tigers. Ground was broken for the new Comerica Park on October 29, 1997.

=== Features ===
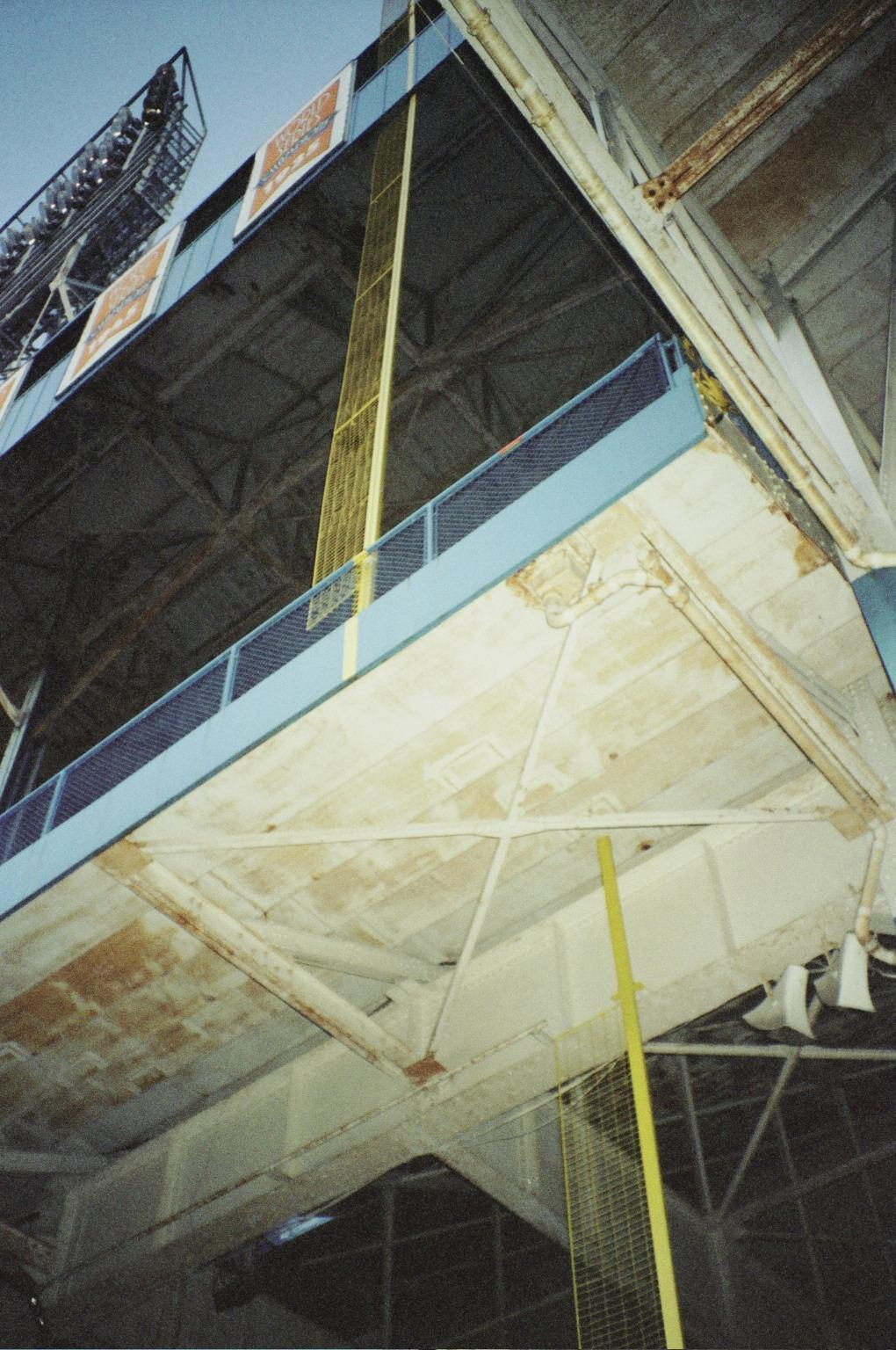
A look under the right field overhang

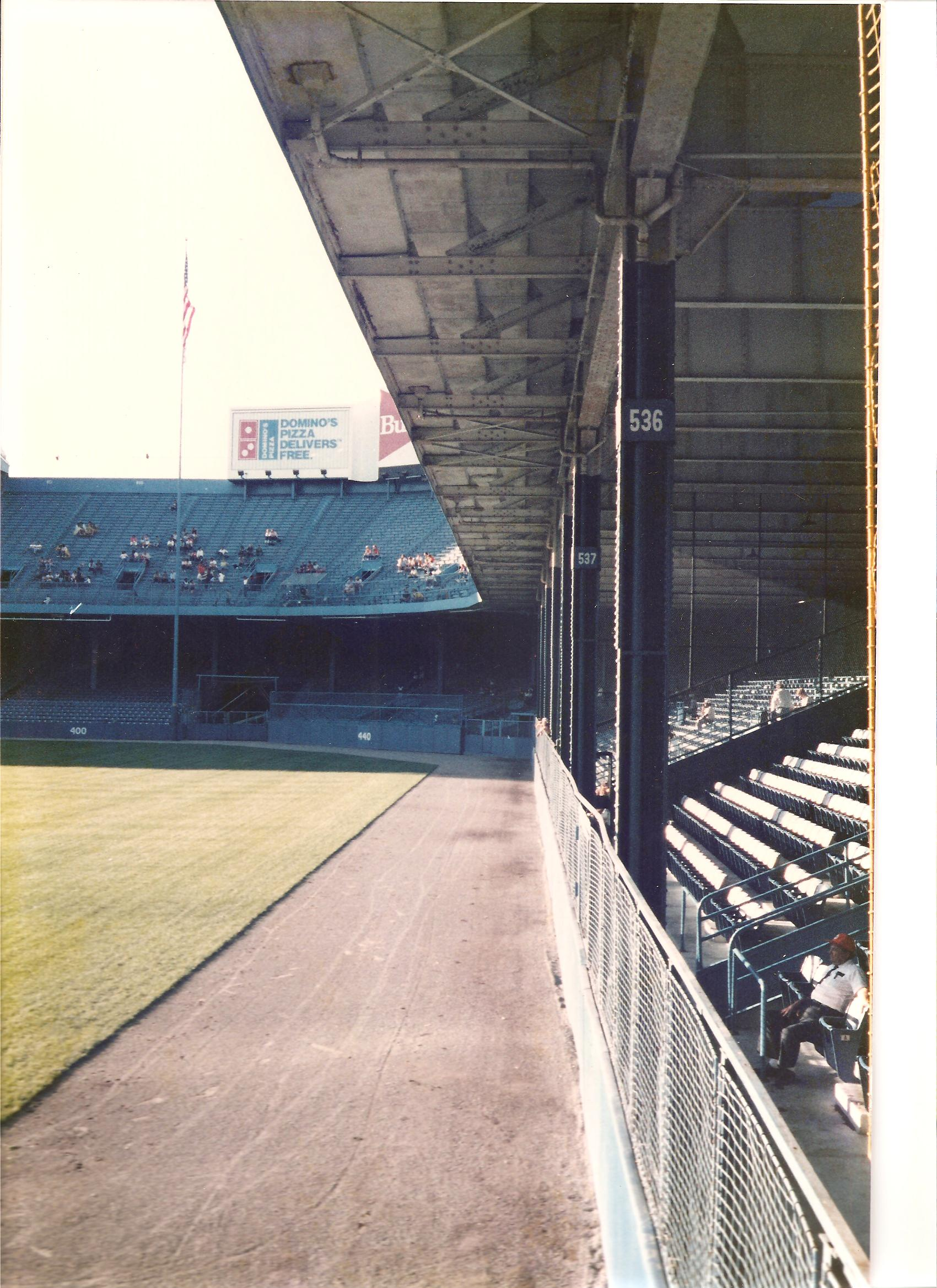
Tiger Stadium right field overhang, looking toward center field

Tiger Stadium had a 125-foot (38 m) tall flagpole in fair play, to the left of dead center field near the 440-foot (134 m) mark. The same flag pole was to be brought to Comerica Park, but this never happened. A new flagpole in the spirit of Tiger Stadium's pole was positioned in fair play at Comerica Park until the left field fence was moved in closer prior to the 2003 season.

When it closed, Tiger Stadium was tied with Fenway Park as the oldest stadium in MLB; the two parks opened on the same date in 1912. Taking predecessor Bennett Park into account, Tiger Stadium was the oldest MLB site in use in 1999.

When the park was expanded in 1936, a second deck was added over the right field pavilion and bleachers. To fit as many seats as possible in the expansion, the second deck was extended over the fence by 10 feet (3 m). The overhang would occasionally turn some extremely high arced fly balls into home runs. Spotlights were added above the warning track to illuminate the area beneath the overhang.

Like other older baseball stadiums such as Fenway Park and Chicago's Wrigley Field, Tiger Stadium offered "obstructed view" seats, some of which were directly behind a steel support column; while others in the lower deck had sight lines obstructed by the low-hanging upper deck. By making it possible for the upper deck to stand directly above the lower deck, the support columns allowed the average fan to sit closer to the field than at any other ballpark.

For a time after it was constructed, the right field upper deck had a "315" marker at the foul pole (later painted over), with a "325" marker below it on the lower deck fence (which was retained). The Texas Rangers claimed that the design of the right field section was copied and used in the construction of what is now Choctaw Stadium, but in fact the upper deck did not actually extend over the right field fence, but was set back by several feet.

Due to then-owner Walter Briggs's dislike of night baseball, lights were not installed at the stadium until 1948. The first night game at the stadium was held on June 15, 1948. Among major league parks whose construction predated the advent of night games, only Wrigley Field went longer before installing lights (1988).

Tiger Stadium featured an upper and lower deck bleacher section that was separated from the rest of the stadium. Chain link and at one time, a barbed wire fence, separated the bleachers from the reserved sections and was the only section of seating not covered by at least part of the roof. The bleachers had their own entrance, concession stands and restrooms.

In 1999, its final season, only this ballpark and Bank One Ballpark had a dirt path that ran from the pitcher's mound to home plate. It originally had one before it was removed.

=== Professional football ===
Tiger Stadium was home of the Detroit Lions from 1938 to 1939, 1941 to 1974. The stadium hosted two NFL Championship Games in 1953 and 1957. The football field ran mostly in the outfield from the right field line to left center field parallel with the third base line. The benches for both the Lions and their opponents were on the outfield side of the field.

In the early 1970s, the city of Pontiac and its community leaders made a presentation to the Metropolitan Stadium Committee of a 155-acre (0.63 km^{2}) site on the city's eastern boundary, north of M-59 and near the intersection with Interstate 75 (I-75). Initially, a dual stadium complex was planned that included a moving roof that was later scrapped due to high costs and the lack of a commitment from the Tigers. The Metropolitan Stadium Committee voted unanimously for the Pontiac site. In 1973, ground was broken for a stadium to exclusively house the Lions.

The Lions played their final game at Tiger Stadium on Thanksgiving Day, November 28, 1974, against the Denver Broncos.

=== Other events ===
In 1939, boxer Joe Louis defended his world heavyweight title with an eleventh-round knockout of Bob Pastor at the stadium.

On October 5, 1951, the University of Notre Dame played the University of Detroit at Briggs Stadium before a capacity crowd of 52,000. It was the first Notre Dame football game to be played at night. The Fighting Irish won, 40–6.

Northern Irish professional soccer club Glentoran F.C. called the stadium home in the late 1960s. The team played as the Detroit Cougars in the United Soccer Association.

Kiss played their first date of the Alive/Worldwide Tour on June 28, 1996. It was the first concert with the original lineup since 1979.

== Notable moments and facts ==
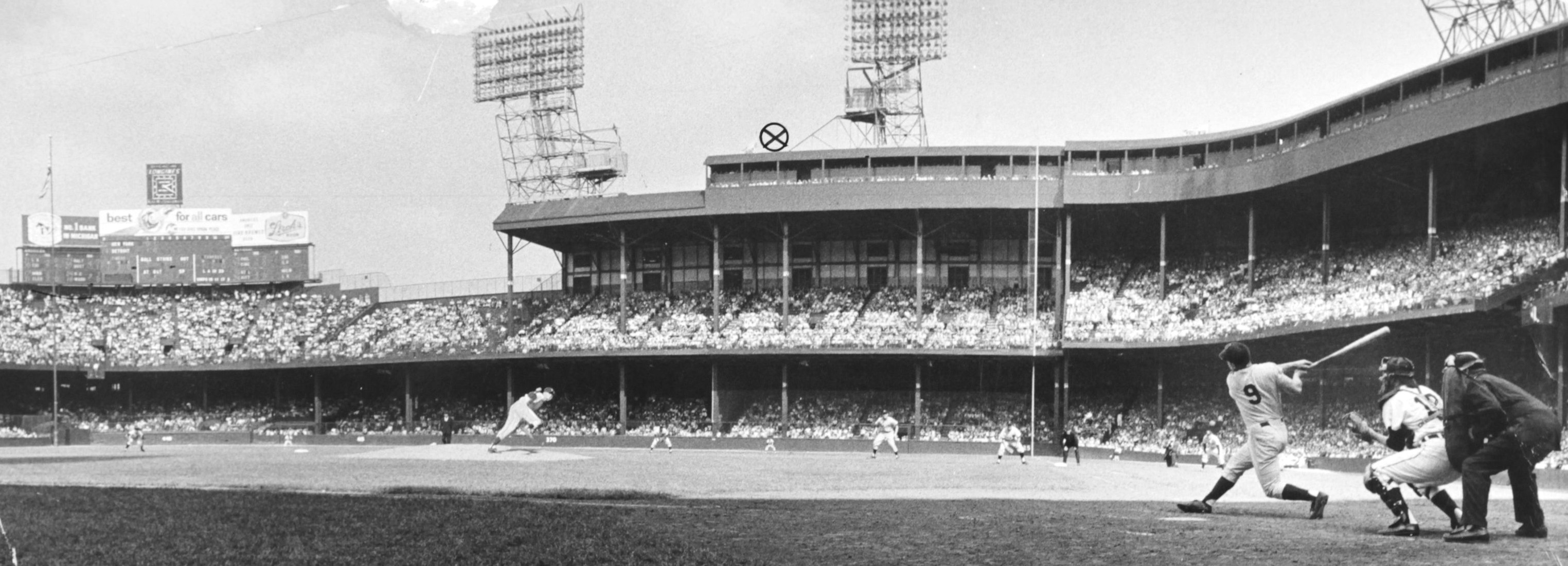
Roger Maris of the New York Yankees strikes out against Detroit Tigers pitcher Jim Bunning in the top of the 3^{rd} inning of a game on September 17, 1961, at Tiger Stadium.

When Ty Cobb played at Navin Field, the area of dirt in front of home plate was kept wet by the groundstaff to slow down Cobb's bunts and cause opposing infielders to slip as they fielded them. The area was nicknamed "Cobb's Lake".

After the sinking of the RMS Titanic, 9-year-old survivor Frank Goldsmith and his mother moved into a house near Navin Field. Every time the crowd cheered, the sound reminded him of the screams of the dying passengers and crew in the water just after the ship sank; as a result, he never took his children to baseball games.

On July 18, 1921, Babe Ruth hit what is believed to be the longest verified home run in Major League Baseball history. The home run went to straightaway center field, clearing the stadium and landing into the street. The distance of the home run has been estimated at up to 575 feet (175 m). On July 13, 1934, at the stadium, Ruth hit his 700th career home run off Tigers' pitcher Tommy Bridges.

On May 2, 1939, ailing New York Yankees first baseman Lou Gehrig voluntarily benched himself at Briggs Stadium, ending his streak of consecutive games at 2,130. Due to the progression of the disease named after him, it was the final game of his career.

The last scoreless tie in the NFL was played at Tiger Stadium between the Detroit Lions and New York Giants on November 7, 1943.

The stadium hosted the 1941, 1951 and 1971 MLB All-Star Games. All three games featured home runs. Ted Williams won the 1941 game with a walk-off three-run home run. The ball was also carrying well in the 1951 and 1971 games. Of the many home runs in those games, the most often replayed is Reggie Jackson's drive to right field that hit so high up in the light tower that the TV camera lost sight of it, until it dropped to the field below. Jackson dropped his bat and watched it sail, seemingly astonished at his own power.

Toward the end of the Lions' game against the Chicago Bears at the stadium on October 24, 1971, Lions wide receiver Chuck Hughes collapsed and later died of a heart attack, making Hughes the only NFL player to date who died during a game.

On April 7, 1986, Dwight Evans hit a home run on the first pitch of Opening Day. This was also the first game on MLB's schedule that season, giving Evans the record for the earliest home run to start a season in terms of at bats.

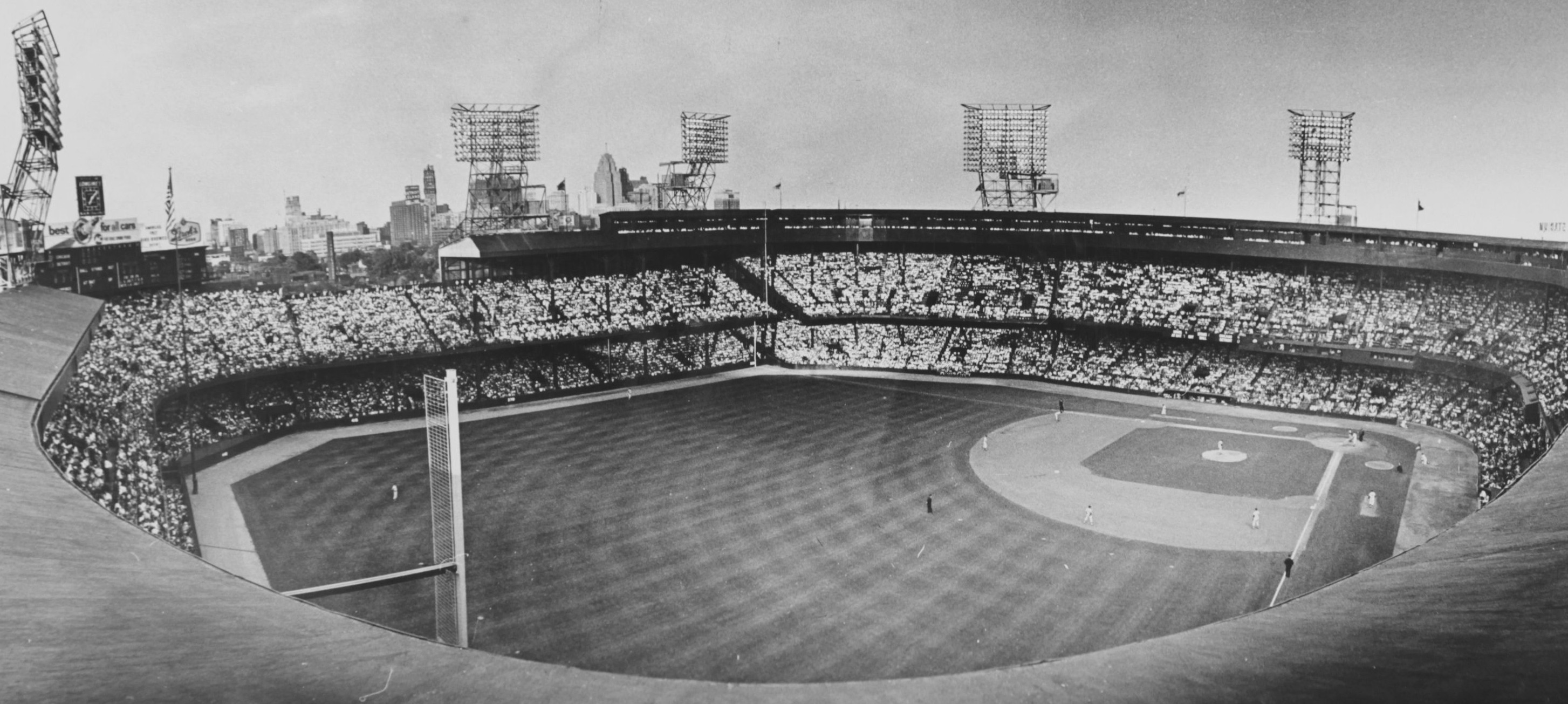
Tiger Stadium in 1961

There were over 30 home runs hit onto the right field roof over the years. It was a relatively soft touch compared to left field, with a 325-foot (99 m) foul line and with a roof that was in line with the front of the lower deck. In left field, it was 15 feet (4.6 m) farther down the line, and the roof was set back some distance. Only four of the game's most powerful right-handed sluggers (Harmon Killebrew, Frank Howard, Cecil Fielder and Mark McGwire) reached the left field rooftop. In his career, Norm Cash hit four home runs over the Tiger Stadium roof in right field and is the all-time leader.

Tiger Stadium saw exactly 11,111 MLB home runs.

=== The final game ===
On September 27, 1999, the final Tigers game was held at Tiger Stadium; an 8–2 victory over the Kansas City Royals, capped by a late grand slam by Robert Fick, which hit the right field roof. It was the final MLB hit, home run, and RBI in Tiger Stadium's history. Following the game, an emotional ceremony with past and present Tigers greats was held to mark the occasion. The Tigers moved to the newly constructed Comerica Park for their 2000 season, leaving Tiger Stadium unused.

== Final years ==
On July 24, 2001, the day Detroit celebrated its 300th birthday, a Great Lakes Summer Collegiate League game between the Motor City Marauders and the Lake Erie Monarchs was played at Tiger Stadium. It was an effort by a local sports management company to bring a Frontier League franchise to Detroit.

In February 2006, a tent on Tiger Stadium's field played host to Anheuser-Busch's Bud Bowl 2006. Among performers at the nightclub-style event was Snoop Dogg. Anheuser-Busch promoted the event as Tiger Stadium's Last Call.

In 2006, the feature-length documentary Stranded at the Corner: The Battle to Save Historic Tiger Stadium was released. Funded by local businessman and ardent stadium supporter Peter Comstock Riley, and directed by Gary Glaser, it earned solid reviews and won three Telly awards and two Emmy awards for the film's writer and co-producer, Richard Bak, a local journalist and the author of two books about the stadium. It was also shown at the inaugural National Baseball Hall of Fame Film Festival in November 2006.

=== Demolition ===
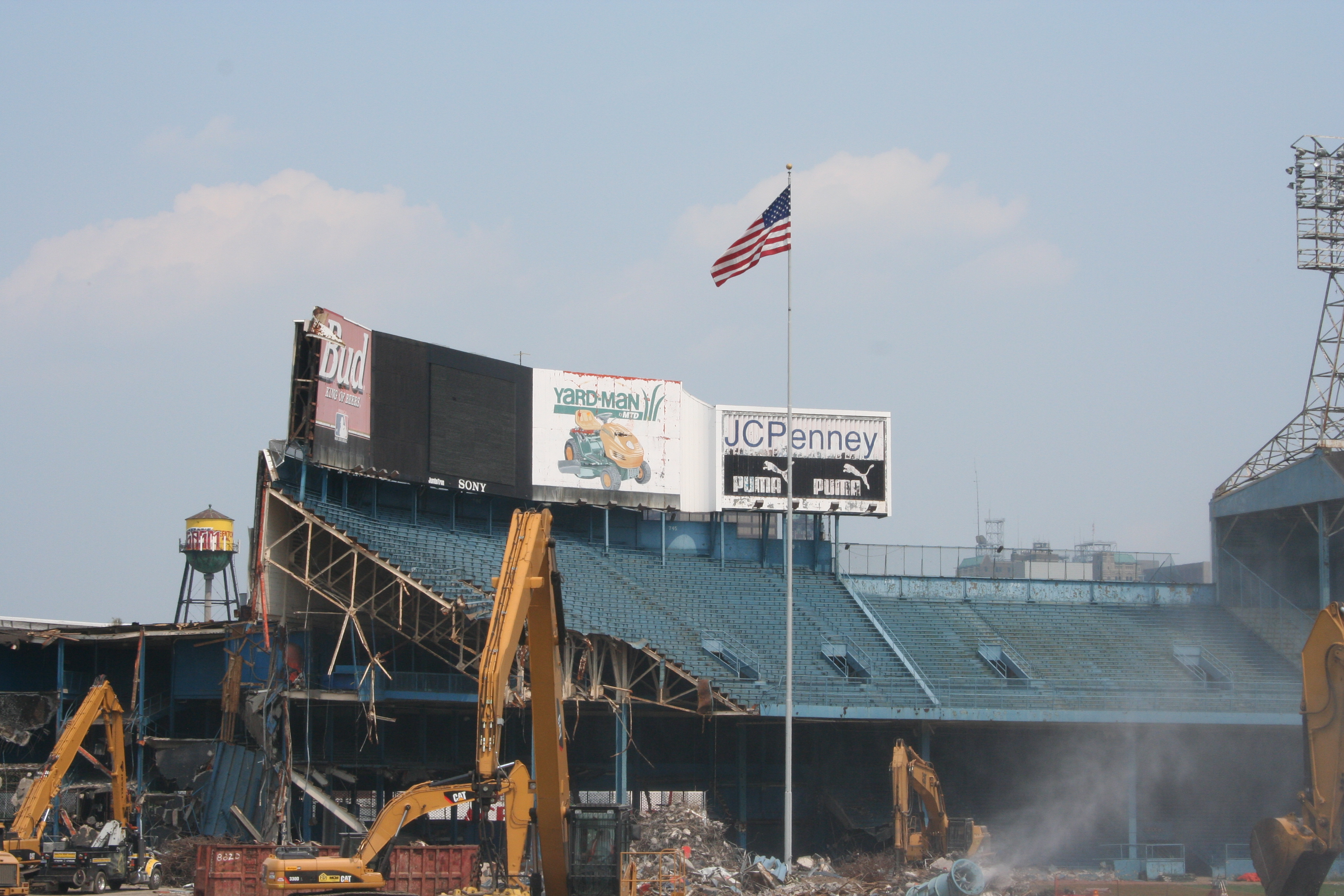
Center field bleachers of Tiger Stadium during partial demolition

There were many proposals to redevelop the site. By 2006, however, demolition appeared inevitable when then-Detroit Mayor Kwame Kilpatrick announced the stadium would be razed. In June 2007, the Detroit Economic Growth Corporation approved a plan to demolish the stadium, which needed approval from Detroit City Council. In July 2007, Detroit City Council voted 5–4 in approval of the demolition.

In October 2007, an online auction of the stadium's memorabilia was held by Schneider Industries, which drew $192,729. The city used the proceeds to defray the demolition costs.

The Detroit Economic Growth Corporation awarded the demolition contract on April 22, 2008, with the speculation that demolition revenue would come from the sale of scrap metal. Demolition began on June 30, 2008. A week into demolition, it was announced that the field, foul poles, and flagpole would be preserved.

After a hiatus wherein various plans to preserve portions of the stadium were considered, demolition was completed on September 21, 2009.

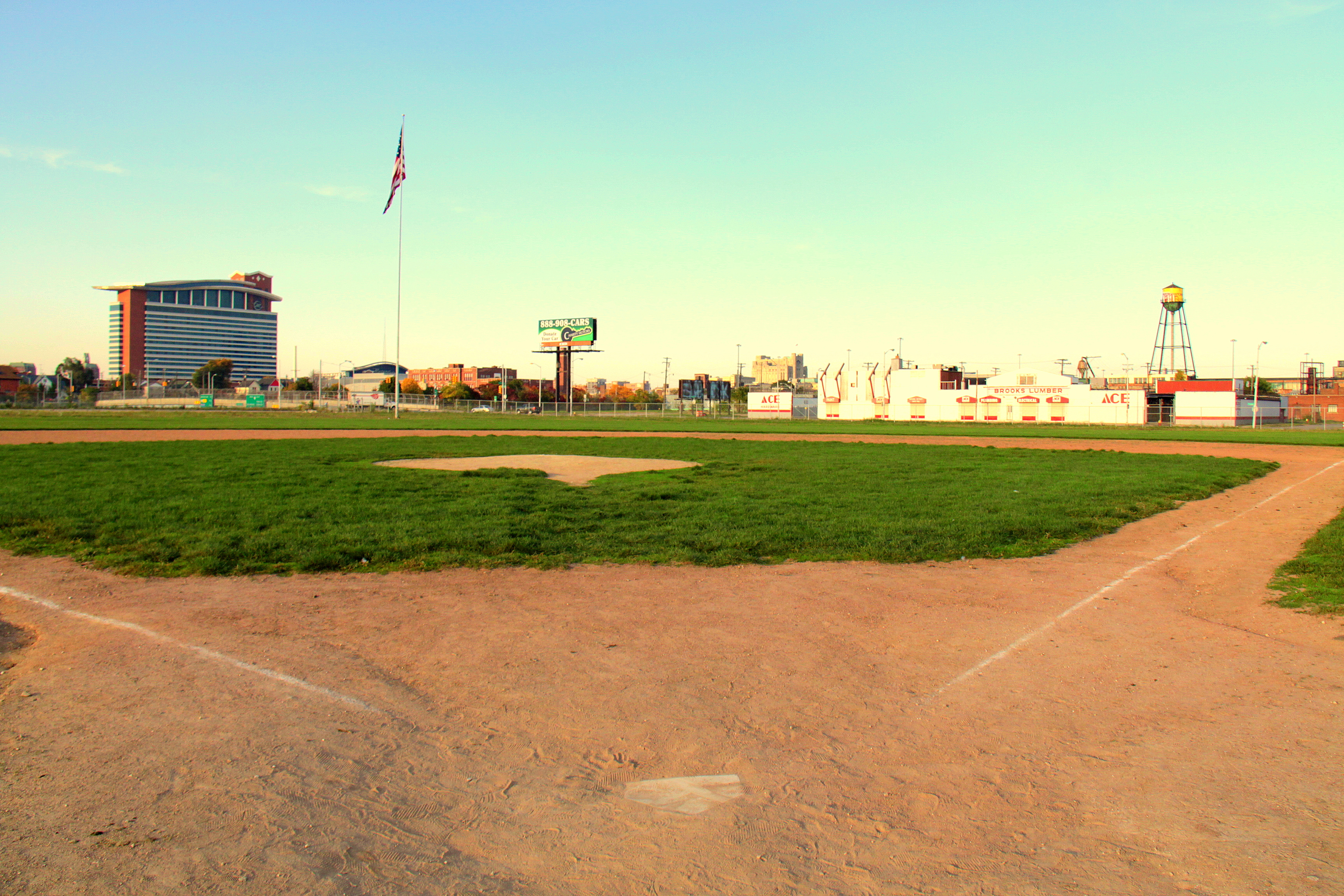
The site in October 2011

=== Redevelopment ===
During the summer of 2010, a group calling itself "The Navin Field Grounds Crew" began maintaining the playing field and hosting vintage baseball, youth baseball, and softball games at the site.

On December 16, 2014, a $33 million project by Larson Realty Group to redevelop the old Tiger Stadium site was approved by Detroit's Economic Development Corporation. Development plans included a four-story building along Michigan Avenue with about 30,000 square feet (2,800 m^{2}) of retail space and 102 residential property rental units, each averaging 800 square feet (74 m^{2}). Along Trumbull Avenue, 24 town homes were planned for sale. Detroit's Police Athletic League (PAL) headquarters would relocate to the site and maintain the field. PAL would build its new headquarters and related facilities on the western and northern edges of the site while preserving the historic playing field for youth sports, including high school and college baseball. Construction of the project began in June 2016.

In 2018, the Corner Ballpark opened at the site.

== Films and television ==
The stadium was seen in the 1980 feature film Raging Bull where it was the site of two of Jake LaMotta's championship boxing matches.

It was depicted in Disney's award-winning Tiger Town, a 1983 made-for-television baseball film written and directed by Detroit native Alan Shapiro, starring Roy Scheider, Sparky Anderson, Ernie Harwell and Mary Wilson. It was also seen in Renaissance Man and Hardball.

In the summer of 2000, the HBO movie 61* was filmed at Tiger Stadium. The film dramatized the efforts of New York Yankees teammates Mickey Mantle and Roger Maris during the 1961 season to break fellow Yankee Babe Ruth's single-season home run record of 60. For the film, computer-generated visual effects were used to make Tiger Stadium resemble Yankee Stadium in 1961. Yankee Stadium is listed in the credits at the end of the film as being played by Tiger Stadium.

During the last days in which part of Tiger Stadium was still standing, scenes for the film Kill the Irishman, which were used to depict Cleveland Stadium, were shot at the stadium.

The pilot of the HBO series Hung featured the stadium's demolition in its opening scene.

== In popular culture ==
- Artist Gene Mack, who drew a series of pictures of several figures and ballparks, mentioned a bone that Ty Cobb used to "bone" his bats as part of his care for them. The bone stayed in the clubhouse after he left the Tigers in 1926 and, indeed, after he retired in 1928.
- In the music video for rapper Eminem's song "Beautiful", Eminem can be seen walking through the stadium, showing the destruction of the stadium.
- The site was filmed for the Hung episode "Fat Off My Love or I'm the Allergen".

== Seating capacity ==
Baseball
Years	Capacity
1912–1922	23,000
1923–1936	30,000
1937	36,000
1938–1960	58,000
1961	52,904
1962	52,850
1963–1968	53,089
1969–1977	54,226
1978–1979	53,676
1980	52,067
1981	52,687
1982–1988	52,806
1989–1996	52,416
1997–1999	46,945

Football
Years	Capacity
1938–1967	52,555
1968–1970	54,082
1971–1974	54,418

== Gallery ==
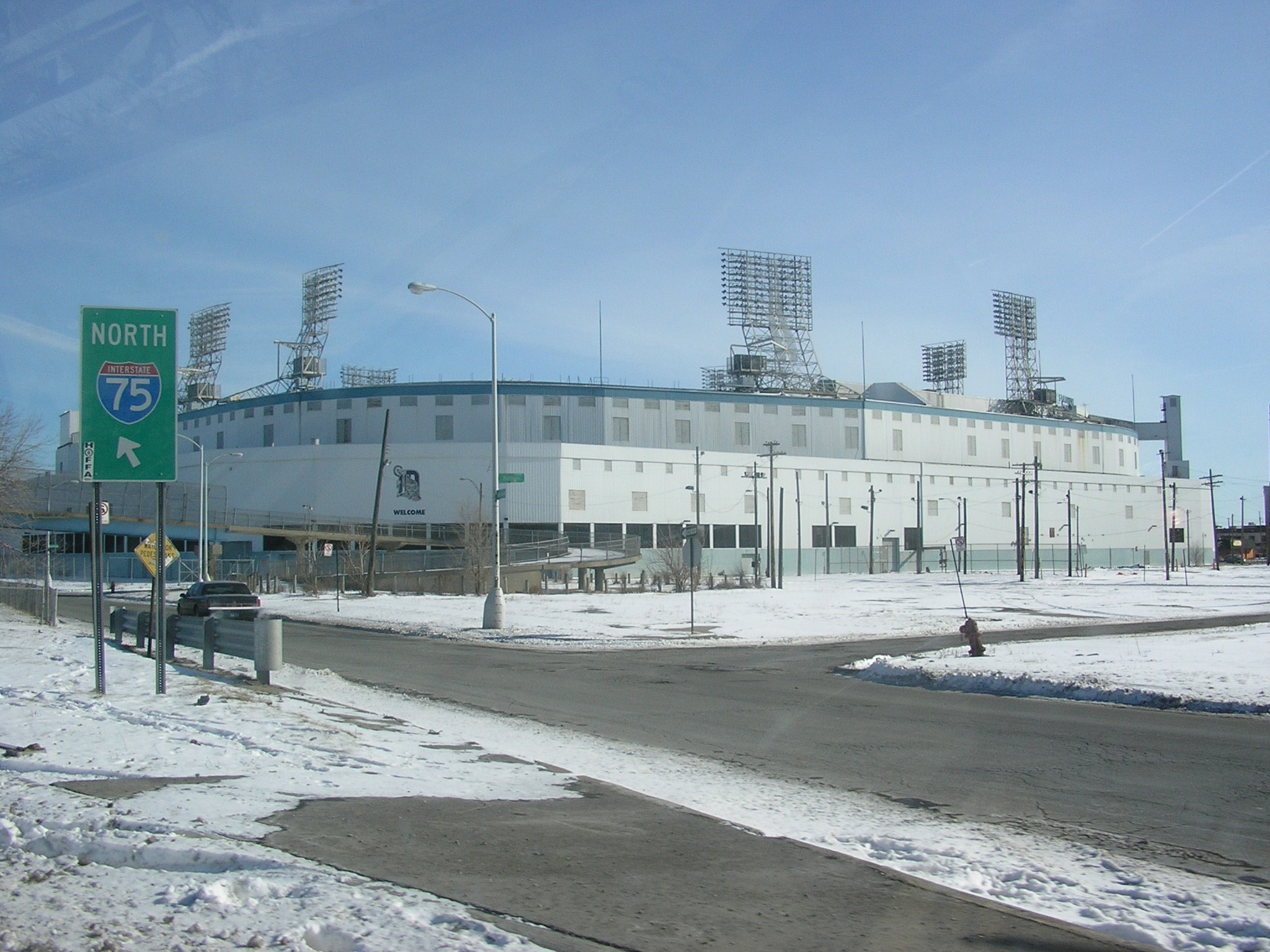
An empty Tiger Stadium in January 2005

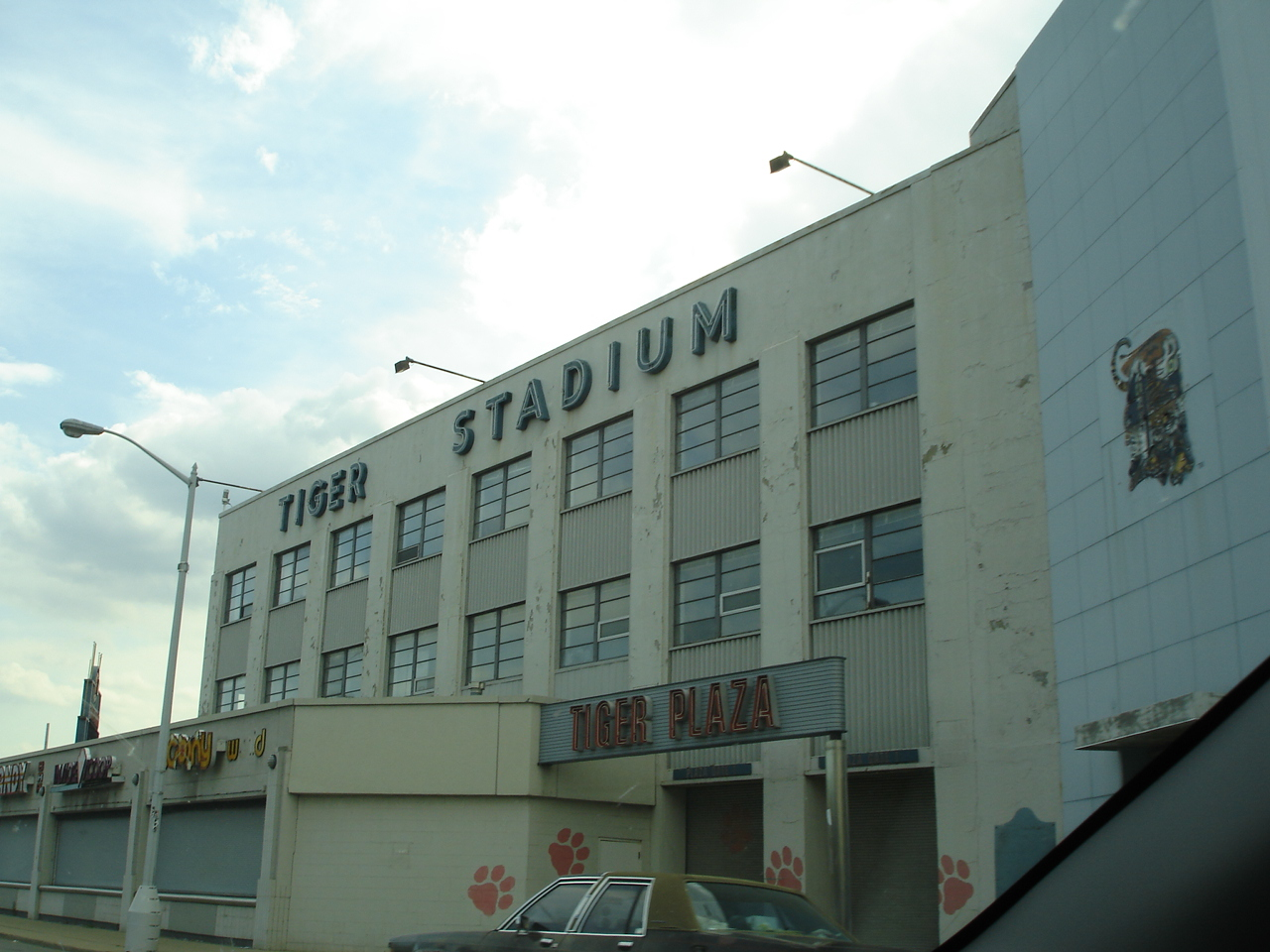
Tiger Stadium showing signs of neglect in 2006

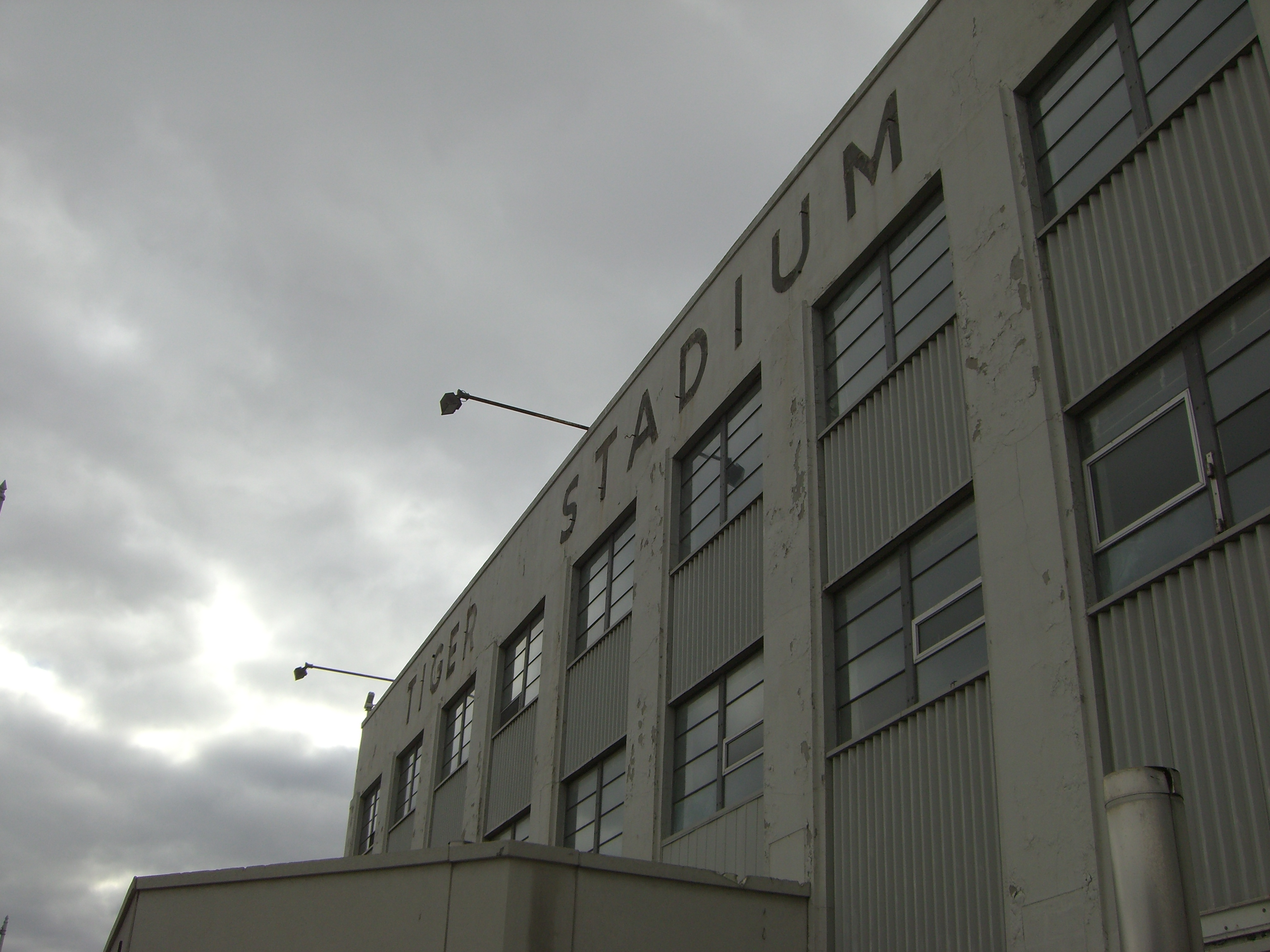
Tiger Stadium with facade lettering removed in November 2007

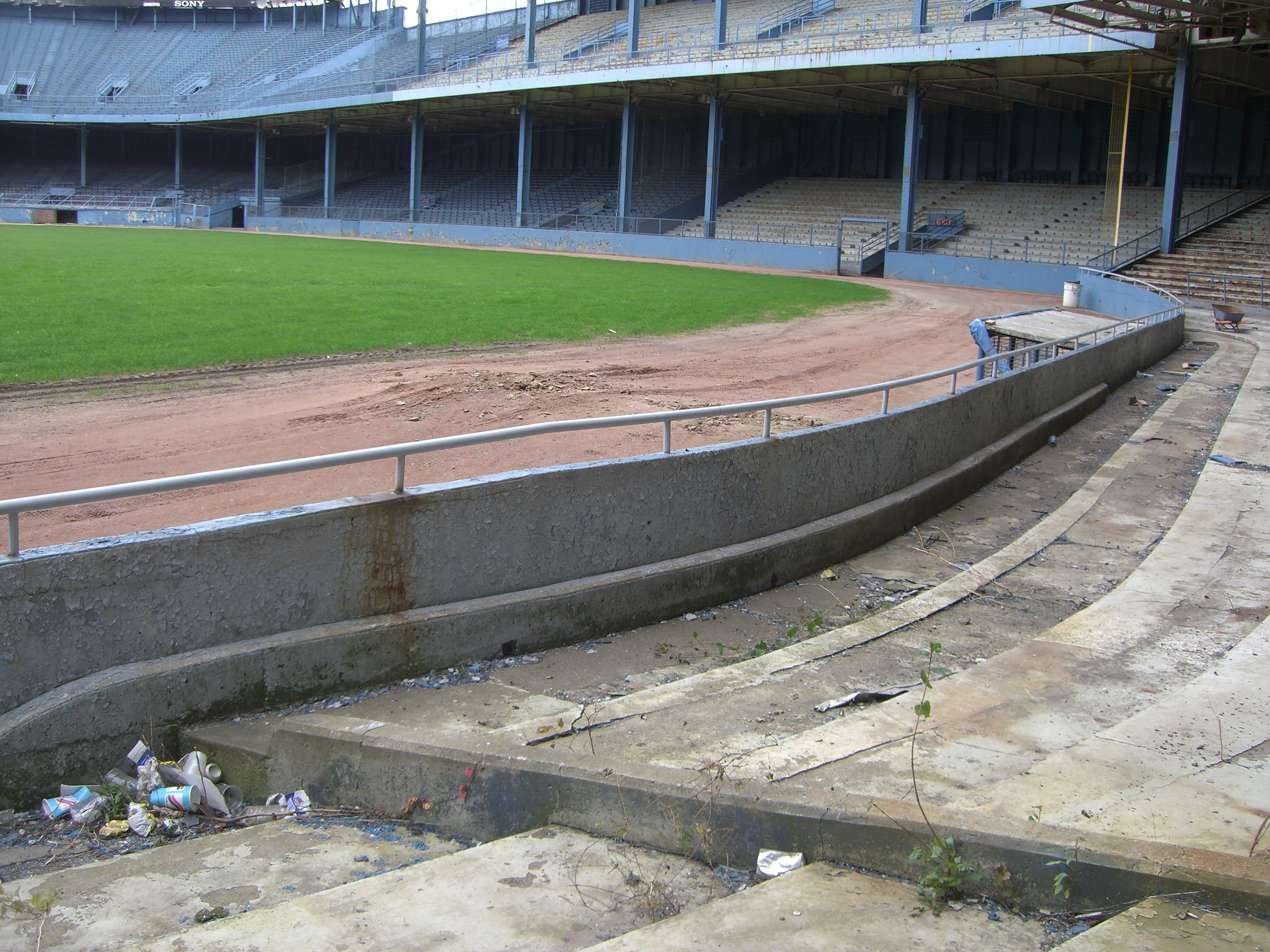
The visitors' bullpen and right field from lower deck in November 2007

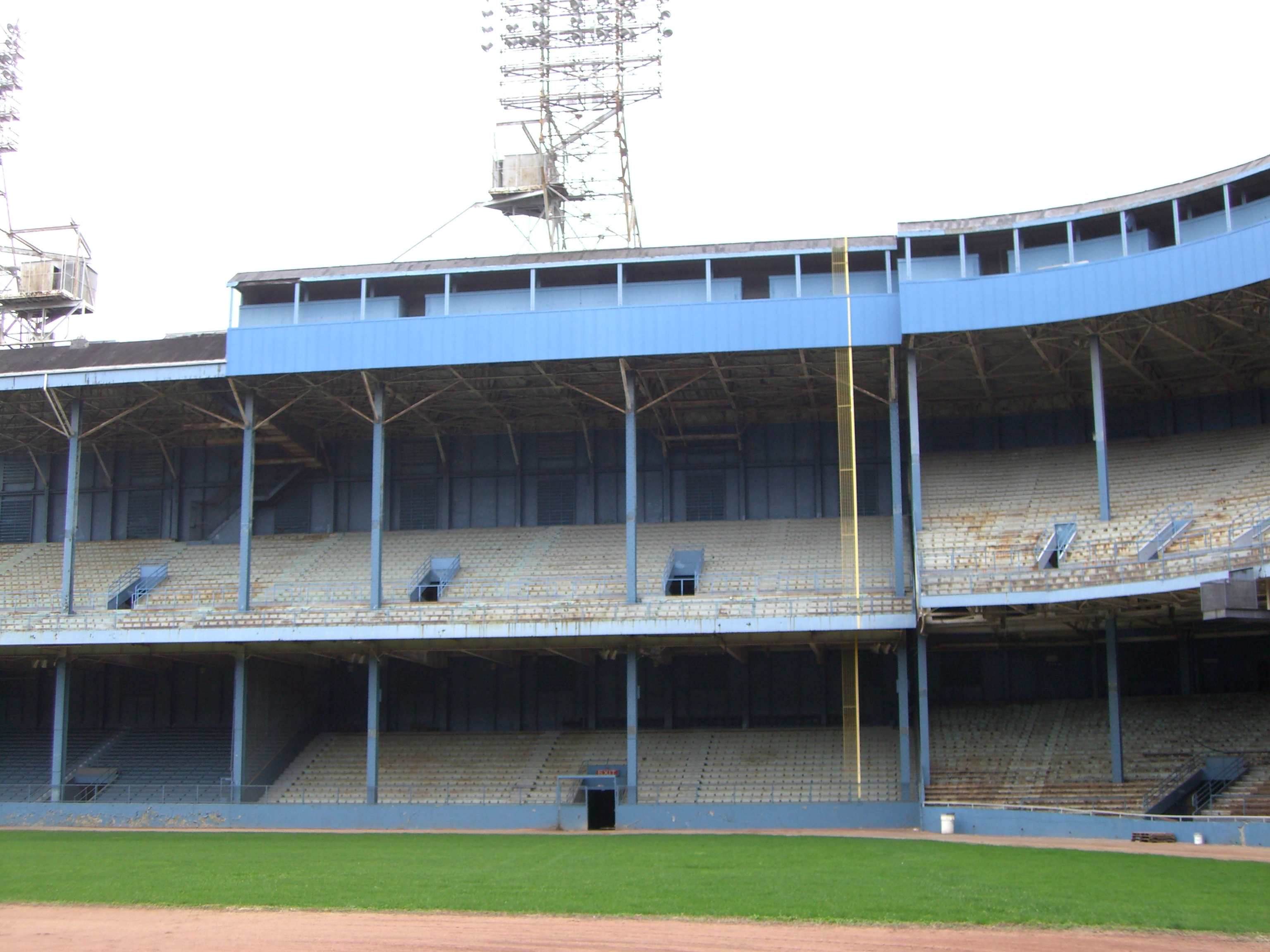
Tiger Stadium with seats removed in November 2007

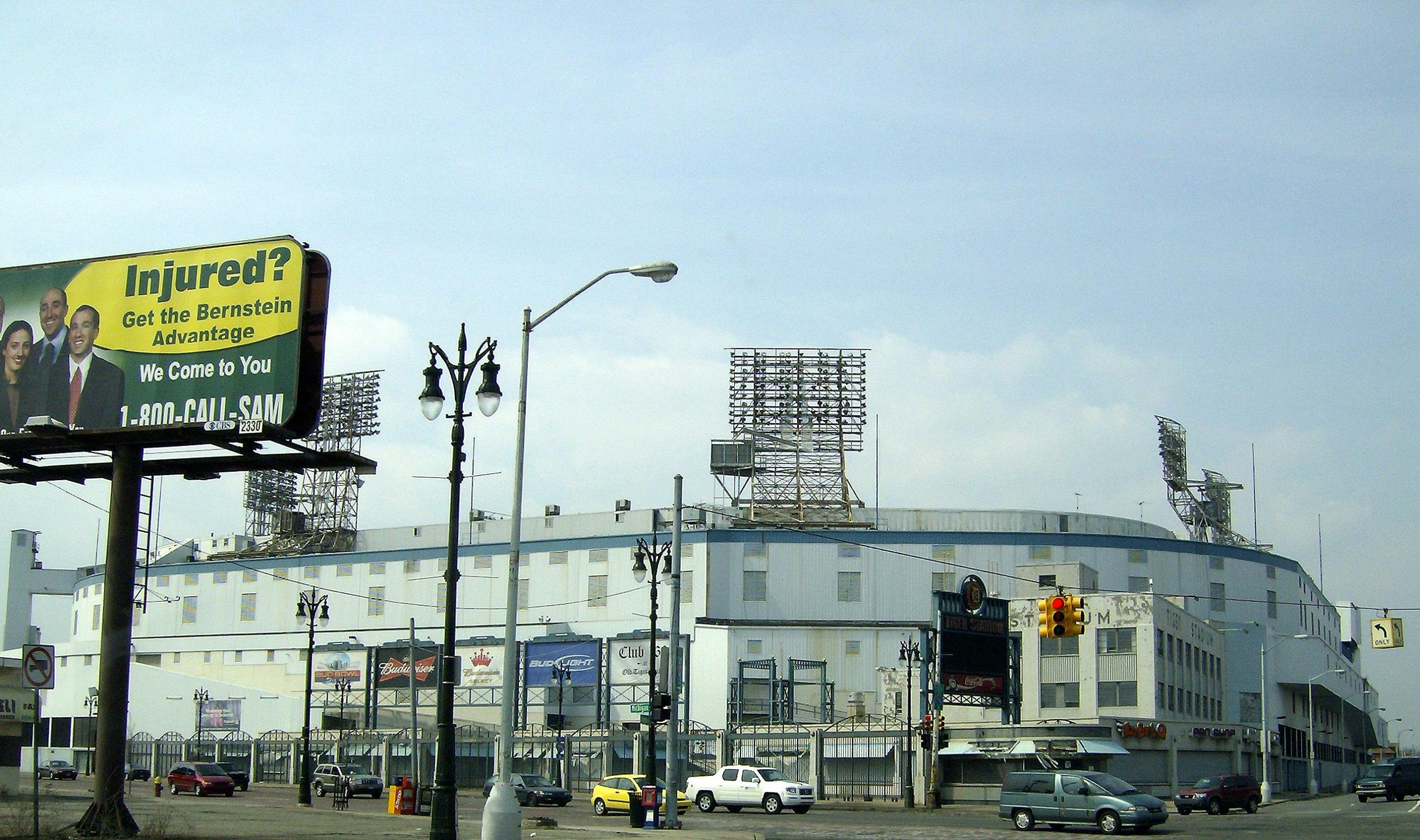
Abandoned in April 2008; Tigers now play in Comerica Park

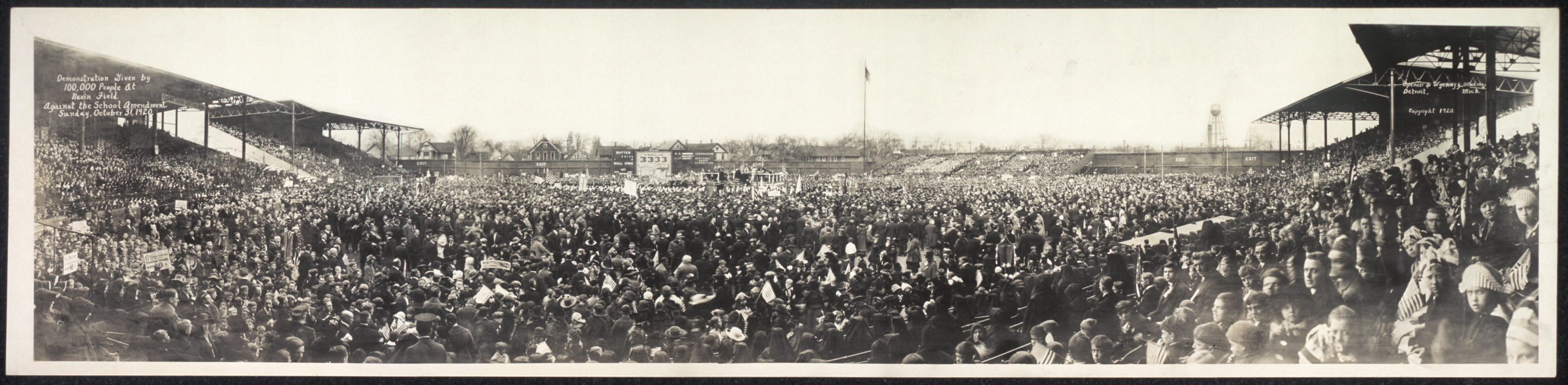
Demonstration against a School Amendment at Navin Field in 1920

Events and tenants
Preceded by Bennett Park	Home of the Detroit Tigers; 1912–1999	Succeeded by Comerica Park
Preceded by University of Detroit Stadium	Home of the Detroit Lions; 1938–1974	Succeeded by Pontiac Silverdome
Preceded by Sportsman's Park; Comiskey Park; Riverfront Stadium	Host of the All-Star Game; 1941; 1951; 1971	Succeeded by Polo Grounds; Shibe Park; Atlanta Stadium
