= Corner Ballpark =

Multipurpose sports stadium in Detroit

- The Corner
- Interactive map of Corner Ballpark
- Address: 1680 Michigan Ave; Detroit, Michigan
- Coordinates: 42°19′55″N 83°4′8″W
- Owner: Detroit Police Athletic League (2018-present)
- Operator: Detroit Police Athletic League
- Capacity: 2,500
- Surface: artificial turf
- Field size: Left field – 340 ft (104 m); Left-center field – 365 ft (111 m); Center field – 440 ft (134 m); Right-center field – 370 ft (113 m); Right field – 325 ft (99 m); Backstop – 66 ft (20 m)
- Public transit: DDOT 1, 2, 29; SMART FAST Michigan 261

Construction
- Groundbreaking: April 13th, 2016
- Opened: March 24th, 2018
- Cost: US$31,000
- Architect: Pendulum

Tenants
- Detroit Police Athletic League (2018-present); Schoolcraft College (MCCAA) (2020-present); Corktown AFC (UWS) (2020-present); Alianza FC (UPSL) (2022-present)

The Corner Ballpark (also known as the Willie Horton Field of Dreams at The Corner Ballpark) is a multi-purpose sports stadium located in the Corktown neighborhood of Detroit. Built on the former site of Tiger Stadium, the stadium opened in 2018 and is the home of the Detroit Police Athletic League. It is also home to numerous youth, college, amateur, and semi-professional sports teams and has also hosted several concerts during the spring and summer.

== History ==
=== Pre-demolition proposals ===
After the closure of Tiger Stadium in 1999, proposals for redevelopment of the stadium were submitted to the city of Detroit. The first one was submitted by the St. Louis-based real estate development McCormack Baron but they were disenchanted with Detroit's problems. The proposal was called off shortly after being submitted. Rumors also circulated of a proposal to redevelop the site into a new arena for the Detroit Red Wings. In 2002, suburban Detroit real estate developer David Sinacola submitted a proposal, similar to what the Corner Ballpark would become, that suggested that the stadium could be converted into a complex of residential lofts, retail stores, restaurants, offices and an athletic club that would overlook the stadium's lush green playing field. The field, developers say, could be used for minor league baseball, high school tournaments, soccer games and concerts.

=== Demolition of Tiger Stadium ===
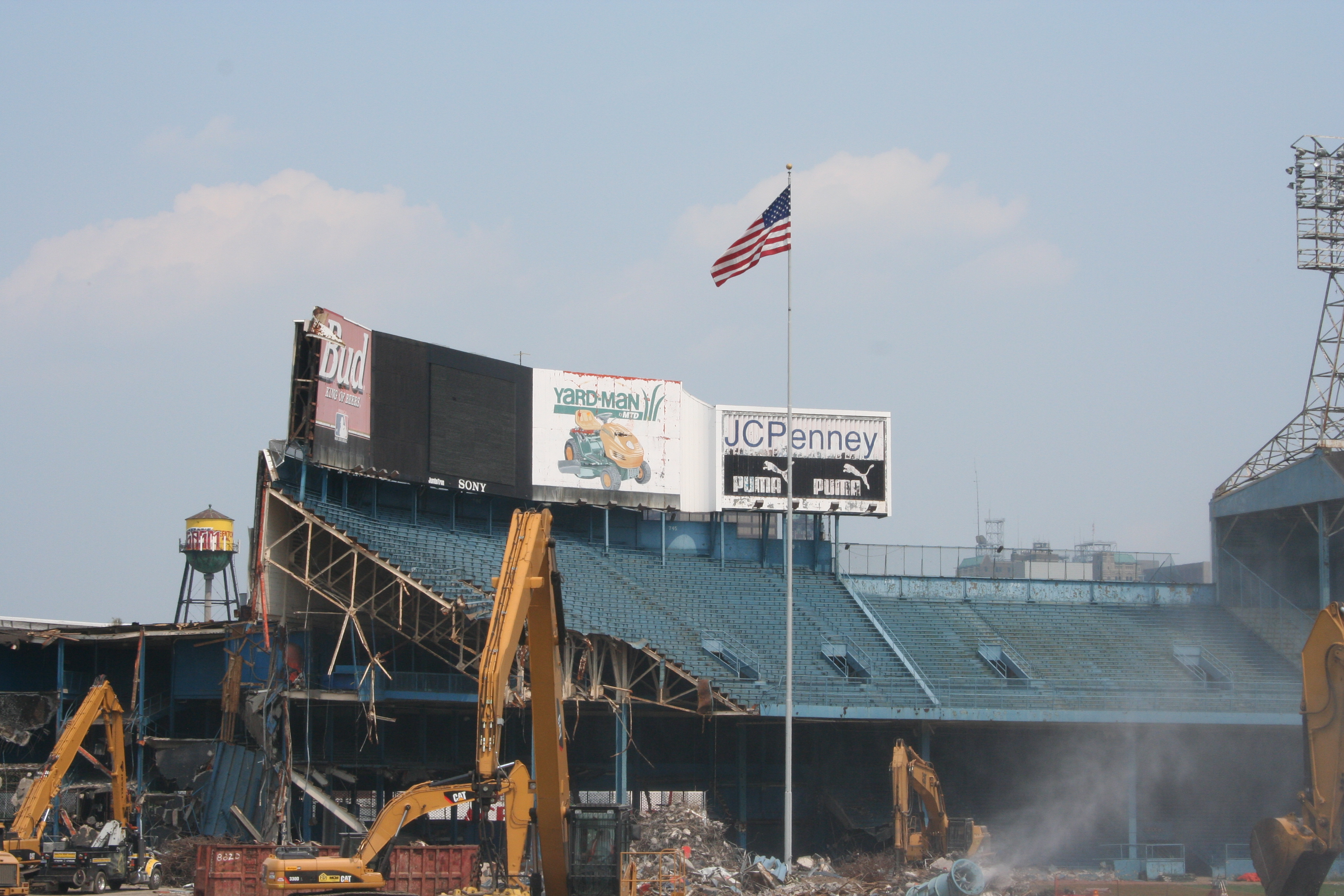
Center field bleachers of Tiger Stadium during partial demolition.

By 2006, however, demolition was inevitable when former Detroit mayor Kwame Kilpatrick announced the stadium would be demolished. In June 2007, the Detroit Economic Growth Corporation approved a plan to demolish the stadium, which needed approval from the Detroit City Council. In July 2007, Detroit City Council voted 5–4 in approval of the demolition. In October 2007, an online auction of the stadium's memorabilia was held by Schneider Industries, a St. Louis based liquidator, which drew $192,729 with the most expensive piece of memorabilia, a piece of the fence around a light tower hit by Reggie Jackson's home run in the 1971 All-Star game. being sold for $4,025.

=== Navin Field Grounds Crew ===
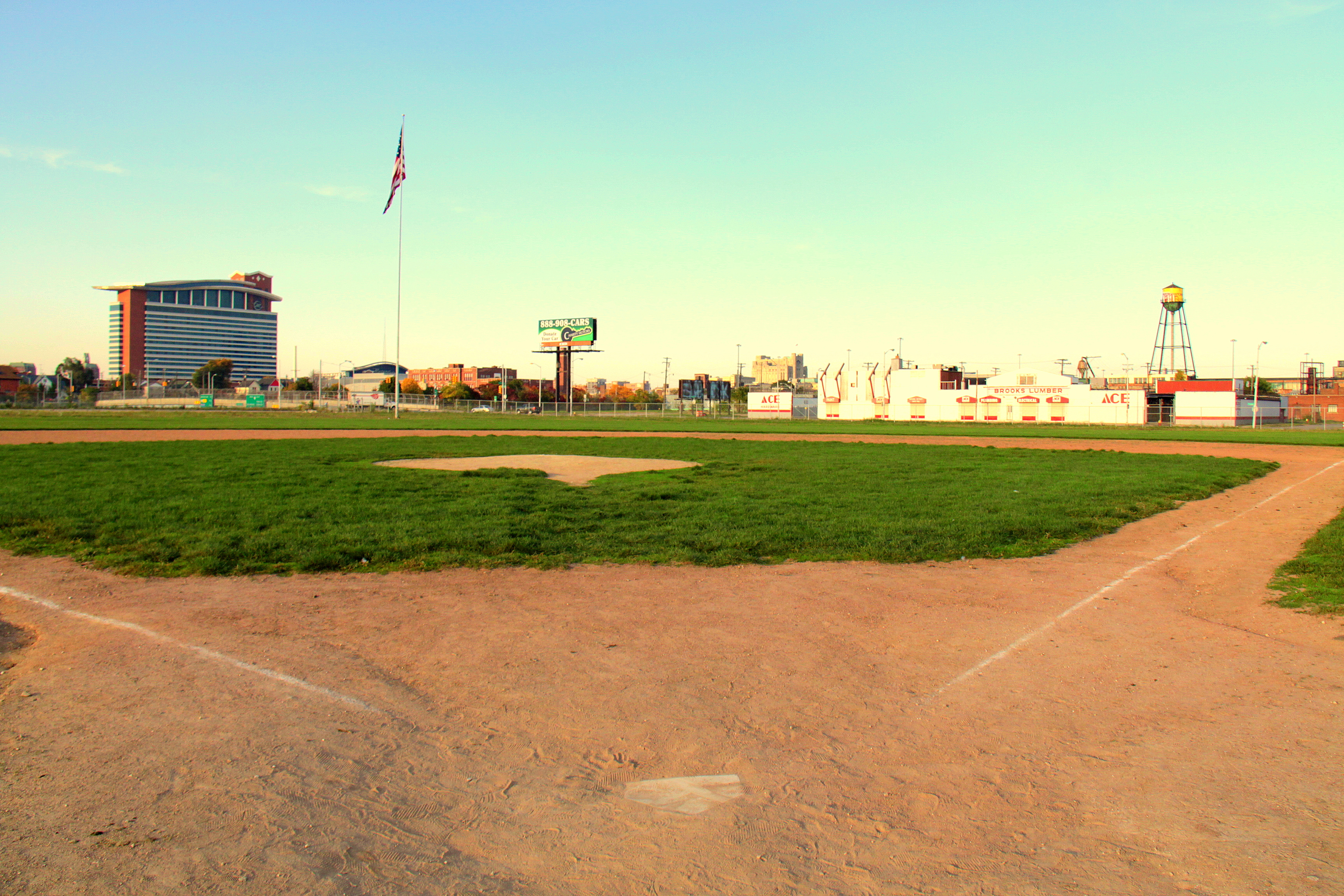
Tiger Stadium (Corner Ballpark) in 2011

In 2009, after Tiger Stadium was demolished, the field sat abandoned and nature began to take over. One year later, a group of citizens led by local Detroit resident Tom Derry, calling themselves the "Navin Field Grounds Crew", named after the old name of the Tiger Stadium, began to work on the field without approval from the city of Detroit. At first, they were chased off the property for trespassing and were threatened with arrest. But they still came back and later began organizing vintage baseball games.

There was at one time also a sign on the enclosing fence dubbing the site "Ernie Harwell Park", named after the late Detroit Tigers sportscaster, Ernie Harwell.

=== Corner Ballpark proposal ===
On December 16, 2014, Larson Realty Group to redevelop the old Tiger Stadium site was approved by Detroit's Economic Development Corporation. Development plans included a 4-story building along Michigan Avenue with about 30,000 square feet (2,800 m^{2}) of retail space and 102 apartment rental units, each averaging around 800 square feet (74 m^{2}). Along Trumbull Avenue, 24 condos were planned for sale. Detroit's Police Athletic League (PAL) headquarters would also relocate to the site and maintain the field. The Detroit Police Athletic League would build its new headquarters and related facilities on the western and northern edges of the site while preserving the historic playing field for youth, college, and semi-professional sports, including high school and college baseball. Construction of the project began in June 2016 with phase 1 of the ballpark completed and opened on March 24, 2018, and the mixed-use development buildings opening in the spring of 2019.

== Features ==
The Corner Ballpark has a 125-foot (38 m) tall flagpole in fair play, to the left of dead center field near the 440-foot (134 m) mark. The flagpole is also the original flagpole that was used at Tiger Stadium. The flagpole was supposed to be brought to Comerica Park, but this never happened.

Along left field sits the headquarters of the Detroit Police Athletic League as well as a "walk of heroes" and a banquet hall underneath the grandstands with a 48-unit affordable housing complex coming in 2023. Along the right field is retail space as well as apartments above the retail spaces. Along center field off of Trumbull sits a condo complex.

== Events ==
On April 20, 2019, Detroit City FC and the Michigan State Spartans played an exhibition soccer game at the Corner Ballpark with Michigan State getting the victory 2–1.

For the 2024 NFL draft, Corner Ballpark was scheduled to host Play Football Field, consisting of American football clinics for youth, family-friendly activities, and a big-screen presentation of much of the draft.

== See also ==
- Baltimore Memorial Stadium and League Park, two other demolished MLB/NFL venues that have active playing facilities on their former sites.
