= Rammstein discography =

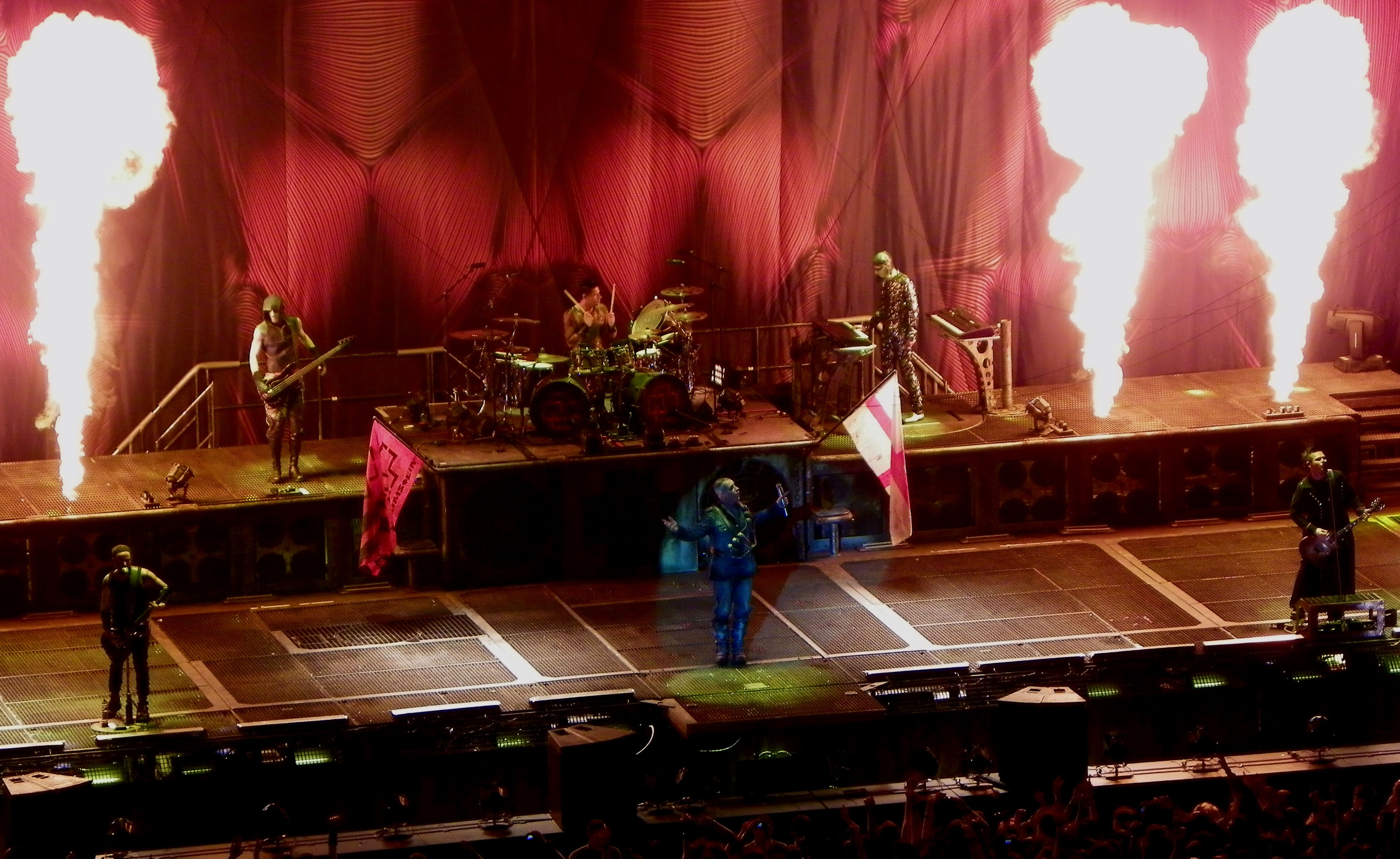
- Rammstein performing at The O2 Arena in London in 2012
- Studio albums: 8
- Live albums: 3
- Compilation albums: 3
- Singles: 34
- Video albums: 6
- Music videos: 34

The discography of Rammstein, a German heavy metal band, consists of eight studio albums, three live albums, and six video albums. Rammstein has also released 33 singles, 30 of which are accompanied by music videos. The band was formed in the mid-1990s by six musicians from East Berlin and Schwerin: singer Till Lindemann, guitarists Richard Kruspe and Paul Landers, keyboardist Flake Lorenz, bassist Oliver Riedel, and drummer Christoph Schneider.

Rammstein debuted with the single "Du riechst so gut", released on 24 August 1995 in a scented digipack format. A month later, the band issued their first studio album, Herzeleid, which peaked at number six on the German Media Control Charts and remained there for 102 weeks. Before the release of their second studio album, Rammstein issued the single "Engel"; the track was featured in the closing credits of the 1997 film Mortal Kombat Annihilation, while the song's music video itself was a tribute to the movie From Dusk till Dawn, released on 1 April 1997. "Engel" reached the top three on the German singles chart and was certified gold by the Bundesverband Musikindustrie (BVMI) for the sale of more than 250,000 copies.

Rammstein's second album, Sehnsucht, was released in August 1997; it topped both German and Austrian charts, and eventually was certified platinum in the respective record industry associations of IFPI. On 31 August 1999, the band released their first live album, Live aus Berlin. It was recorded over two nights at the Wuhlheide Venue, and issued on both CD and DVD formats. Released in April 2001, Mutter is Rammstein's third studio album; it topped the German and Swiss charts and was certified double platinum in both countries. Five tracks were released from the album as singles: "Sonne", "Links 2 3 4", "Ich will", "Mutter" and "Feuer frei!"; the latter was also used in the opening scenes of the Rob Cohen film xXx. In 2003, the group released the DVD Lichtspielhaus, containing live performances, music videos, and interviews.

On 26 July 2004, Rammstein released the single "Mein Teil", a song inspired by a German cannibal, Armin Meiwes, which peaked at number two on both German and Finnish charts. Later that year, the band released their fourth studio album, Reise, Reise; it topped the Austrian, Finnish, German and Swiss charts, and was certified platinum in the last two countries. Other singles from this album include "Amerika", "Ohne dich" and "Keine Lust". Released worldwide on 28 October 2005, Rosenrot peaked at number one in Germany, Austria, and Finland, and was certified gold in Austria and Finland and platinum in Germany. The album spawned the singles "Rosenrot", the homosexuality-themed "Mann gegen Mann" and "Benzin". "Benzin" reached the top of the Danish Tracklisten. In November 2006, the band issued the Völkerball CD and DVD set, featuring live footage filmed in the United Kingdom, France, Japan and Russia, plus a documentary. It peaked at number one in the German and Finnish charts, and was certificated double platinum by BVMI. They have since released three more studio albums, one compilation album, and one live album: Liebe ist für alle da in 2009, Made in Germany (1995-2011) in 2011, Rammstein: Paris in 2017, Untitled in 2019, and Zeit in 2022.

== Albums ==
=== Studio albums ===
List of studio albums, with selected chart positions, sales figures and certifications
Title	Album details	Peak chart positions										Sales	Certifications
Title	Album details	GER	AUS	AUT	FIN	FRA	NLD	SWE	SWI	UK	US	Sales	Certifications
Herzeleid	Released: 25 September 1995; Label: Motor; Format: CD, CS, LP, DL	2	—	11	26	85	77	52	4	—	—		BVMI: 2× Platinum; BPI: Silver
Sehnsucht	Released: 22 August 1997; Label: Motor; Format: CD, CS, LP, DL	1	25	1	13	76	28	15	3	—	45	US: 1,200,000; WW: 3,200,000	BVMI: 5× Gold; BPI: Gold; IFPI AUT: Platinum; IFPI SWI: 2× Platinum; MC: Platinum; NVPI: Gold; RIAA: Platinum
Mutter	Released: 2 April 2001; Label: Motor, Universal; Format: CD, CS, LP, DL	1	10	1	7	23	4	2	1	86	77	FIN: 15,193	BVMI: 7× Gold; BPI: Gold; IFPI AUT: Gold; IFPI FIN: Gold; IFPI SWI: Platinum; NVPI: Gold
Reise, Reise	Released: 27 September 2004; Label: Universal; Format: CD, CS, LP, DL	1	19	1	1	3	2	2	1	37	61	FIN: 26,501; US: 26,716	BVMI: 7× Gold; BPI: Gold; IFPI AUT: Platinum; IFPI FIN: Gold; IFPI SWI: Platinum
Rosenrot	Released: 28 October 2005; Label: Universal; Format: CD, LP, DL	1	44	1	1	5	4	2	2	29	47	FIN: 20,892	BVMI: 3× Platinum; BPI: Silver; IFPI FIN: Gold; IFPI SWI: Platinum
Liebe ist für alle da	Released: 16 October 2009; Label: Universal; Format: CD, LP, DL	1	9	1	1	2	1	3	1	16	13	FIN: 24,843; FRA: 50,000; US: 93,000	BVMI: 7× Gold; BPI: Silver; IFPI AUT: Platinum; IFPI FIN: Platinum; IFPI SWI: Platinum; SNEP: Gold
Untitled	Released: 17 May 2019; Label: Universal; Format: CD, LP, DL	1	5	1	1	1	1	2	1	3	9	FRA: 50,000; GER: 260,000; US: 25,000; WW: 900,000	BVMI: Diamond; BPI: Silver; IFPI AUT: 2× Platinum; IFPI SWI: Platinum; SNEP: Platinum
Zeit	Released: 29 April 2022; Label: Universal; Format: CD, CS, LP, DL	1	3	1	1	1	1	1	1	3	15	GER: 160,000	BVMI: 2× Platinum; IFPI AUT: Platinum; IFPI SWI: Platinum; SNEP: Gold

=== Live albums ===
List of live albums, with selected chart positions, sales figures and certifications
Title	Album details	Peak chart positions										Certifications
Title	Album details	GER	AUT	BEL	FIN	FRA	NLD	NOR	SWE	SWI	US	Certifications
Live aus Berlin	Released: 31 August 1999; Label: Motor; Format: CD, CS, DL	1	2	93	35	97	43	29	42	8	179	BVMI: Platinum; IFPI SWI: Gold
Völkerball	Released: 17 November 2006; Label: Universal; Format: CD	1	3	48	1	54	7	24	11	7	147	BVMI: 2× Platinum; IFPI SWI: Gold
Rammstein: Paris	Released: 19 May 2017; Label: Universal; Format: CD, LP, DL	1	3	2	8	13	10	15	11	3	—	BVMI: Platinum
Live in Mexico City	Released: 20 November 2026; Label: Universal; Format: TBA	To be released										
"—" denotes releases that did not chart or were not released in that country.

=== Compilation albums ===
List of compilation albums, with selected chart positions, sales figures and certifications
Title	Album details	Peak chart positions										Certifications
Title	Album details	GER	AUT	BEL	DEN	FIN	FRA	NLD	NOR	SWE	SWI	Certifications
Made in Germany 1995–2011	Released: 2 December 2011; Label: Universal; Format: CD, DL	1	2	6	6	12	42	18	4	1	5	BVMI: 5× Gold; BEA: Gold; BPI: Silver; IFPI AUT: Gold; IFPI DEN: Gold
Raritäten (1994–2012)	Released: 23 April 2015; Label: Vertigo/Capitol; Format: DL	—	—	—	—	—	—	—	—	—	—	
Remixes	Released: 27 March 2020; Label: Universal; Format: DL	—	—	—	—	—	—	—	—	—	—	
"—" denotes releases that did not chart or were not released in that country.

=== Box sets ===
Title	Album details	Notes
Original Single Kollektion	Released: 19 June 1998; Label: Motor; Format: CD	The set comes in a keepsake box including a poster.
XXI	Released: 4 December 2015; Label: Mercury; Format: LP	This catalogue-spanning anniversary box-set not only features all six studio albums as double LPs, remastered onto 180g heavyweight vinyl, but also comes complete with a separate rarities double LP, "Raritäten", including non-album tracks and a previously unreleased version of the song "Los".

== Singles ==
List of singles, with selected chart positions and certifications, showing year released and album name
Title	Year	Peak chart positions										Certifications	Album
Title	Year	GER	AUT	BEL	DEN	FIN	FRA	NLD	SWE	SWI	UK	Certifications	Album
"Du riechst so gut"	1995	—	—	—	—	—	—	—	—	—	—		Herzeleid
"Seemann"	1996	—	—	—	—	—	—	—	—	—	—		Herzeleid
"Engel"	1997	3	4	—	—	—	—	—	48	17	—	BVMI: Platinum	Sehnsucht
"Du hast"	1997	5	10	—	—	47	—	—	52	33	186	BVMI: Platinum; BPI: Gold; IFPI DEN: Gold	Sehnsucht
"Das Modell"	1997	5	18	—	—	—	—	—	41	—	—		—N/a
"Du riechst so gut '98"	1998	16	—	—	—	—	—	—	—	—	—		Sehnsucht
"Stripped"	1998	14	27	—	—	—	—	—	—	42	—		For the Masses
"Asche zu Asche"	2001	—	—	—	—	—	—	—	—	—	—		Herzeleid
"Sonne"	2001	2	5	44	—	9	—	24	42	18	—	BVMI: 3× Gold; BPI: Gold; IFPI DEN: Platinum	Mutter
"Links 2 3 4"	2001	26	33	—	—	15	—	60	—	65	—		Mutter
"Ich will"	2001	29	59	—	—	19	—	52	—	—	30	BVMI: Gold	Mutter
"Mutter"	2002	47	—	65	—	7	—	69	—	—	—		Mutter
"Feuer frei!"	2002	33	28	—	—	—	—	70	—	—	35	BVMI: Gold; BPI: Silver	Mutter
"Mein Teil"	2004	2	6	40	6	2	60	15	8	11	61		Reise, Reise
"Amerika"	2004	2	3	36	2	10	89	16	21	5	38	BVMI: Gold	Reise, Reise
"Ohne dich"	2004	12	38	—	17	13	—	30	—	42	—	BVMI: Gold	Reise, Reise
"Keine Lust"	2005	16	25	57	4	14	—	19	57	30	35		Reise, Reise
"Benzin"	2005	6	11	33	3	1	81	25	16	15	58		Rosenrot
"Rosenrot"	2005	28	46	62	8	—	—	43	53	59	—		Rosenrot
"Mann gegen Mann"	2006	20	42	60	5	18	—	35	45	66	59		Rosenrot
"Pussy"	2009	1	4	34	37	1	13	43	22	12	95		Liebe ist für alle da
"Ich tu dir weh"	2010	—	74	—	—	—	41	—	—	—	— (Note: "Ich tu dir weh" did not enter the UK Singles Chart, but peaked at number 24 on the UK Rock & Metal Singles Chart.)		Liebe ist für alle da
"Haifisch"	2010	33	—	—	—	—	50	—	—	—	— (Note: "Haifisch" did not enter the UK Singles Chart, but peaked at number 34 on the UK Rock & Metal Singles Chart.)		Liebe ist für alle da
"Mein Land"	2011	5	9	78	—	14	—	88	—	21	— (Note: "Mein Land" did not enter the UK Singles Chart, but peaked at number 10 on the UK Rock & Metal Singles Chart.)		Made in Germany 1995–2011
"Mein Herz brennt"	2012	7	31	127	—	—	109	—	—	33	— (Note: "Mein Herz brennt" did not enter the UK Singles Chart, but peaked at number 8 on the UK Rock & Metal Singles Chart.)	BVMI: Gold	Mutter / Made in Germany 1995–2011
"Deutschland"	2019	1	4	23	—	4	100	74	44	1	98	BVMI: 3× Gold; BPI: Silver; IFPI AUT: Platinum; IFPI DEN: Gold; SNEP: Platinum	Untitled
"Radio"	2019	4	13	67	—	—	—	—	100	17	— (Note: "Radio" did not enter the UK Singles Chart, but peaked at number 9 on the UK Rock & Metal Singles Chart and number 54 on the UK Singles Sales Chart.)	BVMI: Gold; IFPI AUT: Gold	Untitled
"Ausländer"	2019	2	29	52	—	—	—	—	— (Note: "Ausländer" did not enter the Swedish Singellista Chart, but peaked at number three on the Swedish Heatseeker Chart.)	38	— (Note: "Ausländer" did not enter the UK Singles Chart, but peaked at number 29 on the UK Rock & Metal Singles Chart.)	BVMI: Gold; IFPI AUT: Gold; SNEP: Gold	Untitled
"Zeit"	2022	1	6	—	—	17	—	96	72	2	— (Note: "Zeit" did not enter the UK Singles Chart, but peaked at number 29 on the UK Rock & Metal Singles Chart.)	BVMI: Gold	Zeit
"Zick Zack"	2022	1	8	—	—	20	—	—	62	11	— (Note: "Zick Zack" did not enter the UK Singles Chart, but peaked at number 27 on the UK Rock & Metal Singles Chart.)	IFPI AUT: Gold	Zeit
"Dicke Titten"	2022	12	9	—	—	—	—	— (Note: "Dicke Titten" did not enter the Dutch Single Top 100, but peaked at number 11 on the Single Tip chart.)	65	27	—	IFPI AUT: Gold	Zeit
"Angst"	2022	5	21	—	—	—	—	—	71	19	—		Zeit
"Adieu"	2022	13	48	—	—	—	—	—	—	56	—		Zeit
"Du hast / Spiel mit mir (2023 Mix)"	2023	—	—	—	—	—	—	—	—	—	—		Sehnsucht (Anniversary Edition)
"—" denotes releases that did not chart or were not released in that country.

== Promotional only singles ==
- "Sehnsucht" (1997) *1999: US Active Rock #39
- "Te quiero puta!" (2005)

== Other charted songs ==
List of other charted songs, with selected chart positions, showing year released and album name
Title	Year	Peak chart positions					Album
Title	Year	GER	AUT	SWE	SWI	UK	Album
"Rammlied"	2009	—	—	57	28	—	Liebe ist für alle da
"Zeig dich"	2019	13	20	99	30	— (Note: "Zeig Dich" did not enter the UK Singles Chart, but peaked at number 27 on the UK Rock & Metal Singles Chart.)	Untitled
"Puppe"	2019	22	—	—	—	— (Note: "Puppe" did not enter the UK Singles Chart, but peaked at number 37 on the UK Rock & Metal Singles Chart.)	Untitled
"Sex"	2019	27	—	—	—	— (Note: "Sex" did not enter the UK Singles Chart, but peaked at number 38 on the UK Rock & Metal Singles Chart.)	Untitled
"Was ich liebe"	2019	33	—	—	—	—	Untitled
"Diamant"	2019	36	—	—	—	—	Untitled
"Weit weg"	2019	37	—	—	—	—	Untitled
"Tattoo"	2019	39	—	—	—	—	Untitled
"Hallomann"	2019	58	—	—	—	—	Untitled
"Armee der Tristen"	2022	—	—	80	69	—	Zeit
"Schwarz"	2022	—	—	— (Note: "Schwarz" did not enter the Swedish Singellista Chart, but peaked at number 12 on the Swedish Heatseeker Chart.)	—	—	Zeit
"Giftig"	2022	—	—	— (Note: "Giftig" did not enter the Swedish Singellista Chart, but peaked at number five on the Swedish Heatseeker Chart.)	—	—	Zeit
"OK"	2022	—	—	— (Note: "OK" did not enter the Swedish Singellista Chart, but peaked at number 14 on the Swedish Heatseeker Chart.)	—	—	Zeit
"Meine Tränen"	2022	—	—	— (Note: "Meine Tränen" did not enter the Swedish Singellista Chart, but peaked at number 19 on the Swedish Heatseeker Chart.)	—	—	Zeit
"—" denotes releases that did not chart or were not released in that country.

== Videography ==
=== Video albums ===
List of video albums, with selected chart positions, sales figures and certifications
Title	Video details	Peak chart positions							Certifications
Title	Video details	GER	AUT	BEL	FIN	NOR	SWE	SWI	Certifications
Live aus Berlin	Released: 31 August 1999; Label: Motor; Format: DVD, VHS	—	10	7	2	10	—	—	ARIA: Gold; BVMI: 2× Platinum; IFPI SWI: Gold; RIAA: Gold
Lichtspielhaus	Released: 1 December 2003; Label: Motor; Format: DVD	25	5	4	2	4	5	—	AMPROFON: Gold; BPI: Gold; BVMI: Platinum; IFPI SWI: Platinum; SNEP: Gold
Völkerball	Released: 17 November 2006; Label: Universal; Format: CD & DVD	—	—	1	1	—	—	—	BVMI: 2× Platinum; BPI: Gold
Videos 1995 - 2012	Released: 14 December 2012; Label: Universal; Format: DVD, BD	5	3	3	1	—	—	2	BVMI: Gold
Rammstein in Amerika	Released: 25 September 2015; Label: Universal; Format: DVD, BD	1	1	1	1	1	1	1	BVMI: 2× Platinum
Rammstein: Paris	Released: 19 May 2017; Label: Universal; Format: DVD, BD	1	3	2	8	15	11	3	BVMI: Gold; SNEP: Gold
"—" denotes releases that did not chart or were not released in that country.

=== Music videos ===
Year	Song	Director
1995	"Du riechst so gut"	Emanuel Fialik
1996	"Seemann"	László Kádár, Jesse Benson
1997	"Rammstein"	Emanuel Fialik
1997	"Engel"	Hannes Rossacher, Norbert Heitker, Philipp Stölzl
1997	"Du hast"	Philipp Stölzl
1998	"Du riechst so gut '98"	Philipp Stölzl, Carsten Gutschmidt
1998	"Stripped"	Philipp Stölzl, Sven Budelmann
2001	"Sonne"	Jörn Heitmann
2001	"Links 2 3 4"	Jürgen Haas, Zoran Bihać
2001	"Ich will"	Jörn Heitmann
2002	"Mutter"	Jörn Heitmann
2002	"Feuer frei!"	Rob Cohen
2004	"Mein Teil"	Zoran Bihać
2004	"Amerika"	Jörn Heitmann
2004	"Ohne dich"	Jörn Heitmann
2005	"Keine Lust"	Jörn Heitmann
2005	"Benzin"	Uwe Flade
2005	"Rosenrot"	Zoran Bihać
2006	"Mann gegen Mann"	Jonas Åkerlund
2009	"Pussy"	Jonas Åkerlund
2009	"Ich tu dir weh"	Jonas Åkerlund
2010	"Haifisch"	Jörn Heitmann
2011	"Mein Land"	Jonas Åkerlund
2012	"Mein Herz brennt (Piano Version)"	Zoran Bihać
2012	"Mein Herz brennt (Explicit Version)"	Zoran Bihać, Eugenio Recuenco (uncredited)
2013	"Mein Herz brennt (Original Version)"	Eugenio Recuenco
2019	"Deutschland"	Specter Berlin
2019	"Radio"	Jörn Heitmann
2019	"Ausländer"	Jörn Heitmann
2022	"Zeit"	Robert Gwisdek
2022	"Zick Zack"	Jörn Heitmann
2022	"Angst"	Robert Gwisdek
2022	"Dicke Titten"	Jörn Heitmann
2022	"Adieu"	Specter Berlin

== Other works ==
- Trial by Fire (2000): promotional-only compilation album. It was released on 24 December 2000 as a Christmas gift for official fanclub members but was also sent out to journalists in the UK to promote the band.
- "Waidmanns Heil" (2011): single released on 16 April 2011 only in the UK by Rammstein's label Spinefarm Records for "Record Store Day 2011". It was available for just one day. Five test pressings of this vinyl exist.
- "Pussy / Mein Teil" (2014): third single from the compilation album Made in Germany. It was released on 19 April 2014, only in the UK. The single is part of "Record Store Day 2014".
- XXI Notenbuch Klavier (2015/2016): book that includes select songs with piano notes and a bonus CD.
