= Lichtspielhaus =

Video by Rammstein
- Released: 1 December 2003
- Genre: Neue Deutsche Härte
- Length: 210:00
- Label: Motor, Universal
- Producer: Jacob Hellner, Rammstein
- Compiler: Emanuel Fialik, Arne Weingart

Rammstein chronology
Live aus Berlin (1999)	Lichtspielhaus (2003)	Völkerball (2006)

Lichtspielhaus (obsolete German for "cinema"; literally "light-play house") is the second DVD by German Neue Deutsche Härte band Rammstein, released on 1 December 2003. It is a compilation of all their videos until then, and some live performances, commercial advertisements, trailers and makings-of features.

== Track listing ==
=== Videos ===
1. "Du riechst so gut"
2. "Seemann"
3. "Rammstein"
4. "Engel"
5. "Du hast"
6. "Du riechst so gut 98"
7. "Stripped"
8. "Sonne"
9. "Links 2-3-4"
10. "Ich will"
11. "Mutter"
12. "Feuer frei!"

=== Concert highlights ===
- 100 Jahre Rammstein Arena Berlin 1996
  - Herzeleid
  - Seemann
- Philipshalle Düsseldorf 1997
  - Spiel mit mir
- Rock am Ring Festival 1998
  - Heirate mich
  - Du hast
- Live aus Berlin Wuhlheide 1998
  - Sehnsucht (Edited studio recording over live performance)
- Big Day Out Festival Sydney 2001
  - Weißes Fleisch
  - Asche zu Asche
- Velodrom Berlin 2001
  - Ich will
  - Links 2 3 4

=== Making of ===
1. Du hast
2. Du riechst so gut 98
3. Sonne
4. Links 2-3-4
5. Ich will

=== TV trailers ===
1. Achtung Blitzkrieg!
2. Du hast
3. Links 2-3-4
4. Mutter

== Certifications ==
Certifications and sales for Lichtspielhaus
Region	Certification	Certified units/sales
Argentina (CAPIF)	Platinum	8,000^{^}
France (SNEP)	Gold	10,000^{*}
Germany (BVMI)	Platinum	50,000^{^}
Mexico (AMPROFON)	Gold	10,000^{^}
New Zealand (RMNZ)	Platinum	5,000^{^}
Switzerland (IFPI Switzerland)	Gold	3,000^{^}
United Kingdom (BPI)	Gold	25,000^{*}
^{*} Sales figures based on certification alone.^{^} Shipments figures based on certification alone.
