= Rammstein: Paris =

Paris

Live album by Rammstein
- Released: 19 May 2017
- Recorded: 2012
- Venue: Bercy Arena (Paris)
- Genres: Neue Deutsche Härte; industrial metal
- Length: 117:17 (CD); 124:00 (LP); 142:35 (DVD/BD incl. making of)
- Languages: German; English and French in parts
- Labels: Universal; Spinefarm
- Producers: Stefan Glaumann; Jacob Hellner; The Three Musketeers; Tom van Heesch

Rammstein chronology
Rammstein in Amerika (2015)	Paris (2017)	Untitled (2019)

Rammstein: Paris is the fourth concert film and third live album by German Neue Deutsche Härte band Rammstein. It was released on 19 May 2017. For the film, the concerts on 6 and 7 March 2012 were filmed entirely. The scenes were cut with scenes recorded during rehearsals for the tour. Every show was filmed with 30 cameras in front of 17,000 people each night in Paris.

Before its theatrical release the film was shown three times: at the Cannes Film Festival (11 May 2016), CinemaxX cinema Cologne (11 August 2016) and at the Avant Première Film Festival Berlin (14 February 2017). The movie had its official world premiere on 16 March 2017 at the Volksbühne in Berlin. All members of the band were present, as well as director Jonas Åkerlund.

== Reception ==
Rammstein: Paris was nominated at the UK Music Video Awards 2017, where it won in the Best Live Concert category. The audio is mixed in Dolby Atmos, with an additional soundtrack being LPCM stereo (48 kHz/24-bit).

== Track listing ==
All tracks are written by Rammstein (Richard Kruspe, Paul Landers, Till Lindemann, Christian Lorenz, Oliver Riedel, Christoph Schneider).

DVD/Blu-ray: Live concert (Bercy Arena, Paris, 6 and 7 March 2012)
No.	Title	Length
1.	"Intro"	5:45
2.	"Sonne" ("Sun")	5:01
3.	"Wollt Ihr das Bett in Flammen Sehen??" ("Do you want to see the bed in flames?")	5:01
4.	"Keine Lust" ("No desire")	4:10
5.	"Sehnsucht" ("Longing")	4:25
6.	"Asche zu Asche" ("Ashes to ashes")	4:07
7.	"Feuer frei!" ("Open fire!")	3:33
8.	"Mutter" ("Mother")	5:24
9.	"Mein Teil" ("My part")	7:44
10.	"Du riechst so gut" ("You smell so good")	5:28
11.	"Links 2-3-4" ("Left 2-3-4")	5:03
12.	"Du hast" ("You have")	4:19
13.	"Haifisch" ("Shark")	6:57
14.	"Bück dich" ("Bend over")	7:55
15.	"Mann gegen Mann" ("Man against man")	4:15
16.	"Ohne dich" ("Without you" including curtsy)	8:14
17.	"Mein Herz brennt" ("My heart burns")	5:06
18.	"Amerika" ("America")	4:55
19.	"Ich will" ("I want")	4:04
20.	"Engel" ("Angel")	5:16
21.	"Pussy" (including curtsy and titles)	15:05
22.	"Frühling in Paris" ("Spring in Paris")	6:22
Total length:		128:09

DVD/Blu-ray: Documentary
No.	Title	Length
1.	"Making of "Paris""	13:29

Live CD: Disc one (Bercy Arena, Paris, 6 and 7 March 2012)
No.	Title	Length
1.	"Intro"	4:13
2.	"Sonne" ("Sun")	4:44
3.	"Wollt ihr das Bett in Flammen sehen?" ("Do you want to see the bed in flames?")	5:06
4.	"Keine Lust" ("No desire")	4:07
5.	"Sehnsucht" ("Longing")	4:26
6.	"Asche zu Asche" ("Ashes to ashes")	4:05
7.	"Feuer frei!" ("Fire free!")	3:34
8.	"Mutter" ("Mother")	5:20
9.	"Mein Teil" ("My part")	7:46
10.	"Du riechst so gut" ("You smell so good")	5:27
11.	"Links 2-3-4" ("Left 2-3-4")	5:02
12.	"Du hast" ("You have")	4:17
13.	"Haifisch" ("Shark")	5:23
Total length:		63:30

CD: Disc two
No.	Title	Length
1.	"Bück dich" ("Bend over")	7:54
2.	"Mann gegen Mann" ("Man against man")	4:14
3.	"Ohne dich" ("Without you")	7:28
4.	"Mein Herz brennt" ("My heart burns")	5:08
5.	"Amerika" ("America")	4:51
6.	"Ich will" ("I want")	4:07
7.	"Engel" ("Angel")	5:12
8.	"Pussy"	8:20
9.	"Frühling in Paris" ("Spring in Paris")	6:16
Total length:		53:30

Vinyl: Disc one, side A
No.	Title	Length
1.	"Intro"	4:13
2.	"Sonne" ("Sun")	4:44
3.	"Wollt ihr das Bett in Flammen sehen?" ("Do you want to see the bed in flames?")	5:06
4.	"Keine Lust" ("No desire")	4:07

Disc one, side B
No.	Title	Length
1.	"Sehnsucht" ("Longing")	4:26
2.	"Asche zu Asche" ("Ashes to ashes")	4:05
3.	"Feuer frei!" ("Fire free!")	3:34
4.	"Mutter" ("Mother")	5:20

Disc two, side C
No.	Title	Length
1.	"Mein Teil" ("My part")	7:46
2.	"Du riechst so gut" ("You smell so good")	5:27
3.	"Links 2-3-4" ("Left 2-3-4")	5:02

Disc two, side D
No.	Title	Length
1.	"Du hast" ("You have")	4:17
2.	"Haifisch" ("Shark")	5:23

Disc three, side E
No.	Title	Length
1.	"Bück dich" ("Bend over")	7:54
2.	"Mann gegen Mann" ("Man against man")	4:14
3.	"Ohne dich" ("Without you")	7:28

Disc three, side F
No.	Title	Length
1.	"Mein Herz brennt" ("My heart burns")	5:08
2.	"Amerika" ("America")	4:51
3.	"Ich will" ("I want")	4:07

Disc four, side G
No.	Title	Length
1.	"Engel" ("Angel")	5:12
2.	"Pussy"	8:20
3.	"Frühling in Paris" ("Spring in Paris")	6:16

Disc four, side H
No.	Title	Length
1.	"Crowd Symphony"

Rammstein: Paris was released in the following formats:

- Digital: download and audio streaming
- Audio CD: 2 CDs
- Standard edition: 1 DVD or 1 Blu-ray (6 panel digipak)
- Special edition: 1 DVD or 1 Blu-ray, 2 CDs (8 panel digipak)
- Limited "metal" fan edition: 1 Blu-ray, 2 CDs (laser-cut metal plate cover artwork, 8 panel digipak)
- Deluxe box edition: 4 LPs (blue), 1 Blu-ray, 2 CDs (black cardboard box)

== Personnel ==
- Rammstein:
  - Till Lindemann – lead vocals
  - Richard Kruspe – lead guitar, backing vocals
  - Oliver Riedel – bass guitar
  - Paul Landers – rhythm guitar, backing vocals
  - Christian Lorenz – keyboards
  - Christoph Schneider – drums
- Jonas Åkerlund – director

== Charts ==
=== Weekly charts ===
Chart (2017)	Peak position
Austrian Albums (Ö3 Austria)	3
Belgian Albums (Ultratop Flanders)	2
Belgian Albums (Ultratop Wallonia)	4
Danish Albums (Hitlisten)	25
Dutch Albums (Album Top 100)	10
Finnish Albums (Suomen virallinen lista)	8
French Albums (SNEP)	13
German Albums (Offizielle Top 100)	1
Hungarian Albums (MAHASZ)	13
Norwegian Albums (VG-lista)	15
Portuguese Albums (AFP)	19
Scottish Albums (Official Charts)	12
Spanish Albums (Promusicae)	19
Swedish Albums (Sverigetopplistan)	11
Swiss Albums (Schweizer Hitparade)	3
UK Albums (Official Charts)	27

=== Year-end charts ===
Chart (2017)	Position
Austrian Albums (Ö3 Austria)	75
Belgian Albums (Ultratop Flanders)	68
Belgian Albums (Ultratop Wallonia)	111
German Albums (Offizielle Top 100)	9
Swiss Albums (Schweizer Hitparade)	97

Chart (2019)	Position
German Albums (Offizielle Top 100)	76

== Certifications ==
Region	Certification	Certified units/sales
France (SNEP) album	Gold	50,000^{‡}
France (SNEP) video	Gold	5,000^{*}
Germany (BVMI) album	Platinum	200,000^{‡}
^{*} Sales figures based on certification alone.^{‡} Sales+streaming figures based on certification alone.
