= Live aus Berlin =

Live album by Rammstein
- Released: 31 August 1999
- Recorded: 22 and 23 August 1998
- Venue: Parkbühne Wuhlheide (Berlin)
- Genres: Neue Deutsche Härte; industrial metal
- Length: 78:42 (regular edition CD); 111:17 (limited edition); 97:04 (uncensored video and DVD releases)
- Labels: Motor; Mercury; Island Def Jam
- Producers: Jacob Hellner; Rammstein

Rammstein chronology
Sehnsucht (1997)	Live aus Berlin (1999)	Mutter (2001)

Professional ratings
Review scores
Source	Rating
AllMusic	3/5 stars
Rolling Stone	3.5/5 stars

Live aus Berlin (pronounced [ˈlaɪf ʔaʊs bɛʁˈliːn], "Live from Berlin") is a recording of a concert by the German Neue Deutsche Härte band Rammstein, performed in 1998 and released a year later. The release contains live performances of nearly every song from the band's debut album, Herzeleid (9 out of 11 songs, omitting "Der Meister" and "Das Alte Leid"), and most of the songs from their second album, Sehnsucht (8 out of 11 songs, omitting "Alter Mann", "Eifersucht", and "Küss Mich (Fellfrosch)"). It also includes a full-band rendition of the Sehnsucht b-side "Wilder Wein".

The album has been released in several formats:

- CD (15 tracks)
- 2 CD Limited Edition (18 tracks + multimedia content)
- Censored VHS/DVD (without Bück dich)
- Uncensored VHS (with Bück dich)
- Uncensored DVD (released in 2020)

The performance of "Bück dich" ("Bend down", "Bend over") is controversial. The mimed portrayal of anal sex using a water-squirting dildo led to the video being given an 18 certificate in Europe. The first DVD release of the concert does not include the performance, although it is included on the uncensored version of the VHS and CD releases and the 2020 reissue of the DVD.

== Track listing ==
Regular edition CD
No.	Title	Length
1.	"Spiel mit mir ("Play with Me")"	5:22
2.	"Bestrafe mich ("Punish Me")"	3:49
3.	"Weißes Fleisch ("White Flesh")"	4:35
4.	"Sehnsucht ("Longing")"	4:25
5.	"Asche zu Asche ("Ashes to Ashes")"	3:24
6.	"Wilder Wein ("Wild Wine")"	5:17
7.	"Heirate mich ("Marry Me")"	6:16
8.	"Du riechst so gut ("You Smell So Good")"	5:24
9.	"Du hast ("You Have")"	4:27
10.	"Bück dich (Note: Spelled 'Bueck Dich' on CD jewelcase) ("Bend Over")"	5:57
11.	"Engel ("Angel")"	5:57
12.	"Rammstein"	5:29
13.	"Laichzeit ("Breeding Season")"	5:14
14.	"Wollt Ihr das Bett in Flammen Sehen? ("Do You Want to See the Bed in Flames?")"	5:52
15.	"Seemann ("Seaman")"	6:54
Total length:		78:42

- Audio cassette version is available (Side A = 1-8; B = 9-15)
- Some editions contains a hidden track in the pregap, rewind about 58 seconds before track 1.

=== Limited edition ===
Limited edition - CD 1
No.	Title	Length
1.	"Spiel mit mir ("Play with Me")"	6:09
2.	"Herzeleid ("Heartache")"	3:57
3.	"Bestrafe mich ("Punish Me")"	3:48
4.	"Weißes Fleisch ("White Flesh")"	4:36
5.	"Sehnsucht ("Longing")"	4:25
6.	"Asche zu Asche ("Ashes to Ashes")"	3:24
7.	"Wilder Wein ("Wild Wine")"	5:57
8.	"Klavier ("Piano")"	4:50
9.	"Heirate mich ("Marry Me")"	7:47
10.	"Du riechst so gut ("You Smell So Good")"	5:25
11.	"Du hast ("You Have") (Note: listed as 4:36)"	4:27
12.	"Bück dich ("Bend Over")"	6:00
Total length:		60:45

Limited edition - CD 2
No.	Title	Length
1.	"Engel ("Angel") (Note: listed as 6:31)"	6:43
2.	"Rammstein"	5:42
3.	"Tier ("Animal")"	3:42
4.	"Laichzeit ("Spawning Time")"	5:13
5.	"Wollt Ihr das Bett in Flammen Sehen? ("Do You Want to See the Bed in Flames?")"	6:15
6.	"Seemann ("Seaman") (including "Was hast du mit meinem Herz getan?" ("What have you done with my heart?") by Nicholas Lens)"	9:56
Total length:		37:31

CD-ROM tracks
No.	Title	Length
7.	"Tier"	3:52
8.	"Asche zu Asche"	3:42
9.	"Wilder Wein"	5:27
Total length:		13:01

=== Video ===
Video track list
No.	Title	Length
1.	"Spiel mit mir ("Play with Me")"	6:20
2.	"Herzeleid ("Heartache")"	3:58
3.	"Bestrafe mich ("Punish Me")"	3:51
4.	"Weißes Fleisch ("White Flesh")"	4:34
5.	"Sehnsucht ("Longing")"	4:25
6.	"Asche zu Asche ("Ashes to Ashes")"	3:26
7.	"Wilder Wein ("Wild Wine")"	5:58
8.	"Klavier ("Piano")"	4:49
9.	"Heirate mich ("Marry Me")"	7:48
10.	"Du riechst so gut ("You Smell So Good")"	5:24
11.	"Du hast ("You Hate")"	4:34
12.	"Bück dich ("Bend Over") (Note: omitted in censored version)"	5:48
13.	"Engel ("Angel")"	6:33
14.	"Rammstein"	5:43
15.	"Tier ("Animal")"	3:42
16.	"Laichzeit ("Spawning Time")"	5:15
17.	"Wollt Ihr das Bett in Flammen Sehen? ("Do You Want to See the Bed in Flames?")"	6:23
18.	"Seemann ("Seaman")"	8:26
Total length:		97:04

- The DVD version also contains a subtitled 1997 interview, with the band's members, discussing Rammstein in general, and a multi-angle area featuring Tier, Du hast, and Rammstein. There is also a 2-stage quiz accessible through PCs.

=== Easter eggs ===
- When accessing the number pad feature at the menu of the original DVD and entering '23' anywhere in the main menu, the music video Stripped will play. The song is a cover of the Depeche Mode song and is also featured as a bonus track on Rammstein's second album Sehnsucht.
- After winning the second part of the quiz, a weblink and secret password is given in order to download a Rammstein screensaver. The webpage is no longer available.

== Charts ==
=== Weekly charts ===
Chart (1999–2020)	Peak position
Australian Albums (ARIA)	76
Austrian Albums (Ö3 Austria)	2
Austrian Music DVD (Ö3 Austria)	3
Belgian Albums (Ultratop Flanders)	93
Danish Music DVD (Hitlisten)	10
Dutch Albums (Album Top 100)	43
Finnish Albums (Suomen virallinen lista)	35
Finnish Music DVD (Suomen virallinen lista)	1
French Albums (SNEP)	97
German Albums (Offizielle Top 100)	1
New Zealand Albums (RMNZ)	46
Norwegian Albums (VG-lista)	29
Swedish Albums (Sverigetopplistan)	42
Swiss Albums (Schweizer Hitparade)	8
US Billboard 200	179

=== Year-end charts ===
Chart (1999)	Position
German Albums Chart	60

== Certifications ==
Certifications for "Live aus Berlin" (album)
Region	Certification	Certified units/sales
Denmark (IFPI Danmark)	Gold	20,000^{^}
Germany (BVMI)	Platinum	500,000^{‡}
Switzerland (IFPI Switzerland)	Gold	25,000^{^}
^{^} Shipments figures based on certification alone.^{‡} Sales+streaming figures based on certification alone.

Certifications for "Live aus Berlin" (video album)
Region	Certification	Certified units/sales
Australia (ARIA)	Gold	7,500^{^}
Denmark (IFPI Danmark)	Gold	20,000^{^}
Germany (BVMI)	2× Platinum	100,000^{^}
Switzerland (IFPI Switzerland)	Platinum	6,000^{^}
United States (RIAA)	Gold	50,000^{^}
^{^} Shipments figures based on certification alone.

== Personnel ==
- Till Lindemann – vocals
- Richard Kruspe – electric guitars, acoustic guitar on "Wilder Wein", backing vocals, additional keyboards on "Bück dich"
- Paul Landers – electric guitars, acoustic guitar on "Wilder Wein", backing vocals
- Oliver Riedel – bass guitar, acoustic guitar on "Wilder Wein", backing vocals on "Sehnsucht" and "Bück dich"
- Christoph Schneider – drums, additional keyboards on "Wilder Wein"
- Christian Lorenz – keyboards
