= Bobo (singer) =

German singer

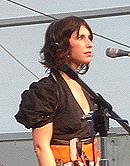
- Bobo 2006 at the TFF Rudolstadt

Background information
- Also known as: Bobo(lina)
- Born: Christiane Hebold; 11 May 1966 (age 60); Hohenthurm, Saalekreis, German Democratic Republic
- Genres: Rock, pop, folk
- Instruments: Vocals, guitar
- Years active: 1980s - present
- Labels: Motor Music; Polydor; Traumton Records
- Website: www.bobo-in-white-wooden-houses.de

Christiane "Bobo(lina)" Hebold (born 11 May 1966) is a German singer who co-founded the band Bobo in White Wooden Houses. She also contributed backing vocals to selected Rammstein songs.

== Bobo in White Wooden Houses ==
In 1990, Bobo formed the band Bobo in White Wooden Houses with Frank Heise, who became the band's guitarist. The band's original line-up included Axel "Lexa" Schäfer on bass (until 1995 and again since 2007) and Ulli Lange on drums (until 1992). In 1995, Heise's suicide caused the band to call a hiatus, which lasted until 2004.

== Work with Rammstein ==
Bobo provides backing vocals for several Rammstein songs. Her contributions started with Sehnsucht's "Engel", which she has also performed with the band live, as can be seen in Live aus Berlin. She can also be heard on the alternative mix from "Alter Mann" which appeared on the single for "Das Modell" and in the song "Nebel", from 2001 album Mutter. In 2005's, Rosenrot she sang on "Stirb nicht vor mir" in the German version of the song, which did not make the final cut, but she can be heard in the backing vocals of the English version, where the female lead was provided by Sharleen Spiteri. However, Rammstein keyboardist Flake Lorenz has claimed he preferred the German version with Bobo's vocals.

== Discography ==
Bobo in White Wooden Houses

- Bobo in White Wooden Houses (1992)
- Passing Stranger (1993)
- Cosmic Ceiling (1995)
- Mental Radio (2007)
- Transparent (2010)

Other projects

- Glow (1996), as Bobo & The London Session Orchestra (arranged and conducted by Wil Malone)
- Alaska (1998), as Bobo, unreleased
- Licht (2001), Saal Drei featuring Bobo
- Volkslieder (2004), as Bobo, re-released as Lieder von Liebe und Tod (2007)
- Liederseelen (2013), as Bobo & Herzfeld
