= Wesely =

Wesely is a surname. Notable people with the surname include:

- David Wesely (born 1945), American wargamer, board game designer, and video game developer
- Don Wesely (1954–2025), American politician from Nebraska
- Ferdinand Wesely (1897–1949), Austrian footballer and coach
- Inka Wesely (born 1991), German football player
- Michael Wesely (born 1963), German art photographer
