= Herzeleid =

Studio album by Rammstein
- Released: 25 September 1995
- Recorded: 1995
- Studios: Polar Studios, BomKrash (Stockholm)
- Genres: Neue Deutsche Härte; industrial metal
- Length: 49:22
- Label: Motor
- Producers: Jacob Hellner; Carl-Michael Herlöfsson

Rammstein chronology
Herzeleid (1995)	Sehnsucht (1997)

Singles from Herzeleid
- 1. "Du riechst so gut" Released: 28 August 1995; 2. "Seemann" Released: 8 January 1996; 3. "Asche zu Asche" Released: 15 January 2001

US version cover

Herzeleid (German pronunciation: [ˈhɛʁtsəˌlaɪt]; "Heartache") is the debut studio album by German Neue Deutsche Härte band Rammstein, first released on 25 September 1995 via Motor Music.

== Production and writing ==
After signing up with Motor Music, the band was instructed to search for a producer, a position they didn't even know about since it wasn't usual in East Germany. They first suggested Bob Rock and Rick Rubin, but the label asked them to be less ambitious. The role was ultimately assigned to Jacob Hellner, known for his work with Clawfinger.

Guitarist Richard Kruspe recalls the band's struggle during their time in Stockholm, Sweden, where the album was recorded at Polar Studios and Hellner's own studio, BomKrash. Because there wasn't a language that both members and producer could speak, the band couldn't properly express their disapproval of the way Hellner was making them sound. This was solved with the help of Dutch engineer Ronald Prent, who served as a middleman between Rammstein and Hellner.

It took them seven days to finish the first song, due to the band's constant disapproval of Hellner's and Prent's inputs. In a 2019 interview to Metal Hammer Prent said every time there was a decision to be made, the members would host what he called a "German Conference" - outdoor meetings that could last from ten minutes to two hours until all six members reached an agreement. Despite the minor setback, Hellner continued to work with Rammstein for 14 years, producing five more albums until 2009's Liebe ist für alle da.

The first song written for this album was "Rammstein", which was also the first song ever written by the band. The last song to be written was most likely "Asche zu Asche" since it was not played at their concerts in 1994, unlike all the other songs. A few songs were written in English before they were translated into German. There are also songs from that era that did not make it onto the album, including:

1. "Jeder lacht" (the lyrics of the first verse were later re-used for the chorus of "Adios" from Mutter)
2. "Schwarzes Glas"
3. "Wilder Wein" (later released as a demo version on Engel: Fan-Edition, a finished live version appeared on Live aus Berlin)
4. "Alter Mann" (later released on Sehnsucht with new music and slightly different lyrics)
5. "Feuerräder" (later released on Engel: Fan-Edition, still in demo phase)
6. "Tier" (1994) (also referred to as "Biest", a fanmade title. Not to be confused with the later released "Tier" from Sehnsucht. Was also used under the name of "Sadist", both on a 1995 tape that used programmed drums, and at a show on 11 October 1996, in Magdeburg, Germany.)
7. "Tiefer Gelegt", or "Tiefer" (working name for "Jeder Lacht", another track that was cut from the album.)

== Title and packaging ==
The album's title translates as "heartbreak", and it reflects personal problems that every band member was going through around the time of the album's preparation, particularly Kruspe and vocalist Till Lindemann, who were breaking up with their respective girlfriends.

The original cover caused controversy when it was originally revealed. It shows the band topless and sweaty. The press said Rammstein depicted themselves in this image as "Herrenmenschen". Guitarist Kruspe said the controversy was "totally stupid", and that "it's just a photo". He did however express his embarrassment in 2016 saying that the band looked "gay...like an ad for a gay porno-film". Lindemann added, that it was a quick shot on a parking lot somewhere in Berlin. North-American versions had a different cover, consisting of the band members' faces from the inside of the original booklet, placed side by side.

Rammstein's first commercial logo was made for Herzeleid by Dirk Rudolph. This variation uses a thinner "T" character than what is used in later logos.

== Release ==
- Herzeleid was released on CD in many countries; the US and Canadian versions had alternative front covers, and were released by Slash Records, but still retained the same songs as on the German version. XIII Bis Records in France released Herzeleid on CD, as well as most of Rammstein's releases before 1999.
- Some editions of the Herzeleid CD were censored. Some copies had the words "Schulhof" (school yard) and "töten" (kill) beeped out during "Weisses Fleisch", and other versions had these words removed from the CD's lyric booklet, but not from the song itself.
- South Korean CDs excluded the song "Das alte Leid" from the tracklist and booklet, although the track is still on the CD.
- Countries such as South Korea, Poland, Germany and the US (among others) produced commercial cassettes for the album. European countries received cassettes featuring the original cover, but US cassettes featured the different cover that they also used on CDs.
- A very scarce number of German CDs were released with stickers to promote Rammstein's concert on 27 September 1996 slotted in the back of the case, in front of the insert artwork.
- A Motor Music pre-release cassette of the album was issued; there are two different variations of this tape, but the only difference is the appearance of the eszett (ß) character used in the title of "Weisses Fleisch".
- The first time Herzeleid has ever been released on vinyl was on the XXI boxset, and the subsequently released individual LPs from said boxset.
- A remastered version of the album was released on 4 December 2020.
- Sales of the next album Sehnsucht helped lift figures for Herzeleid, according to keyboardist Christian Lorenz. The band's debut album went gold five years after their second did.

== Reception and legacy ==
Professional ratings
Review scores
Source	Rating
AllMusic	3/5 stars
Rock Hard	8.5/10
Sputnikmusic	4/5 stars

In 2005, Herzeleid was ranked number 303 in Rock Hard magazine's book of The 500 Greatest Rock & Metal Albums of All Time.

Kruspe reflected in 2016 saying it was not among his favorite albums:

I don't listen back to the record now at all. No. And I don't think it's one of our best albums – not even close. It was a very painful time for all of us. Imagine going through all the personal shit we'd had, and then having a hard time getting the music out. They do say what doesn't kill you makes you stronger, and in a way I am glad to have gone through so much. When you face up to the sort of crises that I was having in my personal life – which led to me starting Rammstein in the first place – then you learn lessons from these, you admit where you've gone wrong, and you try to put things right. So, I have to say there were some good reasons to be grateful to Herzeleid.

== Track listing ==
All tracks are written by Rammstein.

No.	Title	Length
1.	"Wollt Ihr das Bett in Flammen Sehen?" ("Do You Want to See the Bed in Flames?")	5:17
2.	"Der Meister" ("The Master")	4:08
3.	"Weißes Fleisch" ("White Flesh")	3:35
4.	"Asche zu Asche" ("Ashes to Ashes")	3:51
5.	"Seemann" ("Sailor")	4:48
6.	"Du riechst so gut" ("You Smell So Good")	4:49
7.	"Das alte Leid" ("The Old Sorrow")	5:44
8.	"Heirate mich" ("Marry Me")	4:44
9.	"Herzeleid" ("Heartache")	3:41
10.	"Laichzeit" ("Spawning Time")	4:20
11.	"Rammstein"	4:25
Total length:		49:22

== Personnel ==
Writing, performance and production credits are adapted from the album liner notes.

Rammstein*

- Till Lindemann
- Richard Kruspe
- Paul Landers
- Christian Lorenz
- Oliver Riedel
- Christoph Schneider

* Members are not mentioned, just the band's name instead.

Production

- Jacob Hellner, Carl-Michael Herlöffson - production
- Ronald Prent - mixing at Chateau du Pape
- Emanuel Fialik, Olav Bruhn - additional production on "Seemann"

Visual art

- Jan "Praler" Hoffmann (credited as Praler) - photography, cover idea
- Dirk Rudolph - sleeve design

== Charts ==
=== Weekly charts ===
Weekly chart performance for Herzeleid
Chart (1995–2023)	Peak position
Austrian Albums (Ö3 Austria)	11
Belgian Albums (Ultratop Flanders)	30
Belgian Albums (Ultratop Wallonia)	161
Dutch Albums (Album Top 100)	77
French Albums (SNEP)	85
German Albums (Offizielle Top 100)	2
Hungarian Albums (MAHASZ)	38
Lithuanian Albums (AGATA)	30
Swedish Albums (Sverigetopplistan)	52
Swiss Albums (Schweizer Hitparade)	4

Chart (2025)	Peak position
Greek Albums (IFPI)	36

=== Year-end charts ===
Chart (1996)	Peak position
German Albums Chart	84
Chart (1997)	Peak position
German Albums Chart	22
Chart (1998)	Peak position
German Albums Chart	100

== Certifications ==
Region	Certification	Certified units/sales
Denmark (IFPI Danmark)	Platinum	20,000^{‡}
Germany (BVMI)	2× Platinum	1,000,000^{‡}
United Kingdom (BPI) 2020 Remastered version	Silver	60,000^{‡}
Summaries
Europe (IFPI)	Platinum	1,000,000^{*}
^{*} Sales figures based on certification alone.^{‡} Sales+streaming figures based on certification alone.
