= Asche zu Asche =

2001 song by Rammstein

Single by Rammstein

from the album Herzeleid
- Released: 15 January 2001
- Recorded: 1995
- Studio: Polar Studios, Stockholm
- Genre: Neue Deutsche Härte; industrial metal
- Length: 3:51
- Label: Motor
- Songwriters: Richard Kruspe; Paul Landers; Till Lindemann; Christian Lorenz; Oliver Riedel; Christoph Schneider
- Producers: Jacob Hellner; Carl-Michael Herlöffson

Rammstein singles chronology
"Stripped" (1998)	"Asche zu Asche" (2001)	"Sonne" (2001)

"Asche zu Asche" (German: [ˈaʃə tsuː ˈʔaʃə]; "Ashes to Ashes") is a song by German metal band Rammstein. It was released in January 2001, as the fourth single from their album Herzeleid. The single is also included as a bonus disc in the re-released "Australian Tour Edition" of Sehnsucht. This release contains the 1995 album version of the song, as well as five live tracks taken from Live aus Berlin. It was released exclusively in Australia, as a promotion for the Big Day Out festival (2001), for which Rammstein were a headlining act.

== Live performances ==
Since its release, "Asche zu Asche" has been a staple in Rammstein's live shows. It was the only Rammstein song to have been played in every one of the band's tours until 2013. During performances, the microphone stands would be set on fire near the end of the song and clouds of smoke would cover the stage. The song was played at almost every concert from 1995 to 2002. Initially it was not played during the Reise, Reise tour, but was included again by the end of February 2005, ultimately replacing the song "Rein raus" in the setlists. More recently, "Asche zu Asche" has been absent during most of Rammstein's Liebe ist für alle da tour, but has made some rare appearances in Germany and Denmark, replacing the song "Ich tu dir weh", which was "indexed" (banned) by the German Bundesprüfstelle für jugendgefährdende Medien. During these performances, the effects for "Ich tu dir weh" were used instead of the flaming stand. In the Made in Germany 1995–2011 tour, the song was again on the setlist. On the 2024 leg of Rammstein's Stadium Tour, the song was returned to the setlist with only smoke effects and no burning microphone stands.

== Track listing ==
1. "Asche zu Asche" (album version)
2. "Spiel mit mir" (live version)
3. "Laichzeit" (live Version)
4. "Wollt ihr das Bett in Flammen sehen?" (live version)
5. "Engel" (live version)
6. "Asche zu Asche" (live version)
7. Website extras, included as enhanced CD content

== Charts ==
Chart performance for "Asche zu Asche"
Chart (2001)	Peak position
Australia (ARIA)	94
