= Daniel and Geo Fuchs =

German artist couple

Daniel Fuchs (born 1966 in Alzenau) and Geo Fuchs (born 1969 in Frankfurt am Main) are an artist couple who are known for their conceptual photography series in numerous international exhibitions. They began their common photographic work in 1992, producing several large projects including Conserving, Famous Eyes, STASI – Secret Rooms, and Toy Giants.

== Artistic biography ==
In 1992, Daniel and Geo Fuchs started their common photographic work. From the beginning, they focused on producing series of photographs with a conceptual approach.

The prerequisite for their work is an intense analysis of their chosen subject; the production of a series usually takes several months or even years of research, collecting of material, image selection, and test runs.

From an historical art perspective, their oeuvre belongs to concept art; objectivity, staging, and a wealth of detail.

In the beginning, until about 1996, the artist duo's interest was concentrated on topics like ‘Homelessness’, ’Trans-Sexuality’ and ‘Mental Illness’.

Until the year 2008, Daniel and Geo Fuchs mainly worked with large format camera and tripod, a relatively slow, time-consuming process.

In 2009, with the entry of new media, the artist duo began to experiment with digital techniques.

== Work series ==
From the beginning of their international career until now, Daniel & Geo Fuchs’ œuvre can be ordered into seven large projects: Conserving (1998), Famous Eyes (2000), STASI – Secret Rooms (2006), Toy Giants (2006), Forces (2010), Nature and Destruction and – the latest project – The Halva Project (since 2014).

The dead bodies, photographed for the ‘Conserving’ series, have in common that all of them were inserted in formalin to achieve the best possible and durable conservation. Some of them have already existed for several hundred years. In a time when photography did not exist, as a medium ‘to freeze/keep the moment” and provide a visual memory, this process was the alternative and in a certain sense an own form/variety of sculpture became established, which Daniel and Geo Fuchs have emulated for their project. The themes of life, death, aesthetics and uneasiness touch each other in a similar way to the series Conserving, which is organized in three topics – fish, animals, humans.

The fascination, created by the photographs of these preserved creatures, inspired the Berlin band Rammstein to cooperate with Daniel and Geo Fuchs. The artist duo developed the main art concept for the band's third album, Mutter (Mother), 2001, which included the general aesthetic appeal of all singles released and the cover of the ‘Mutter’ Album, which stirred up a controversial discussion in public media. The cover shows a baby that died at birth almost 200 years ago. The baby is conserved in alcohol and was photographed by Daniel Fuchs and Geo Fuchs for their book "Conserving". The promotional photos were also shot by Daniel and Geo Fuchs. All pictures are inspired by original photos in their book "Conserving".

Daniel & Geo Fuchs work series Famous Eyes, focuses exclusively on the human eye. Many artists, architects and curators, including Louise Bourgeois, Sophie Calle, Sir Norman Foster, Andreas Gursky, Jürgen Klauke, David LaChapelle, Sarah Lucas, Paul McCarthy, Jonathan Meese, Shirin Neshat, Dennis Oppenheim, Katharina Sieverding, Harald Szeemann and Sam Taylor-Wood, were photographed for this series. Although the focus of this series is on a single sensory organ, the artwork executed in the form of a collage (collage style) allows a deep insight into the private personality of the photographed person.

The photography series ‘Toy Giants established Daniel and Geo Fuchs popularity on a broader level within the international audience/public. The initial spark was their connection with the collector Selim Varol, who owns one of the largest toy and street art collections in the world. For ‘Toy Giants’ the artist duo established relations between toy figures of all genres like, Batman, Superman, Godzilla, Kill Bill and many others and created with the images a new narrative of their stories.

The miniature sized, protagonists of ‘Toy Giants’, were photographed with a large format camera, and presented in exhibitions in the scale of real existing people, which invites the viewer to participate in an interaction of staging and reality.

‘STASI – Secret Rooms’ demanded a lot of time for research and stressful, extensive paperwork, to gain access to buildings and archives, which were generally closed to the public.

For this project, Daniel and Geo Fuchs photographed rooms representing the former power/ authority of the East Germany government: wiretapped rooms, locations of physical violence, torture, and psycho-terror – and yet it is not a documentary in the classical sense. The photographed view of a not completely closed door, raddled office furniture or a crooked hung portrait of Erich Honecker on the wall, is an artistic visualization of the evidence that the regime was an ailing system long before the fall of the Wall. The images were taken 15 years after the fall of the wall, in rooms, which Daniel and Geo Fuchs still found in their initial condition. In compliance with the status-quo, the artists photographed solely during daylight. The only style element for each picture is the same calculated central point, which seems to drag the viewer into the room.

‘Forces’ is a project, which concentrates on military and warfare. For this series, Daniel and Geo Fuchs used their sober and distant point of view to put single objects like jets, weapons, grenades, and projectiles in the center of their attention – in front of their camera. In the artistic interpretation of Daniel and Geo Fuchs a hand grenade evolves, separated from its original destructive purpose, into an object of extraordinary fascination and aesthetics, a T-mine turns into a stylish beauty.

Aesthetics and destruction are also the subject in the work series ‘Nature and Destruction’.

Nature as Daniel and Geo Fuchs see it, is beauty, offering resources and energy – and at the same time confrontation with the destruction of nature caused by the impact of humankind. In the series “Explosions’ as part of “Nature and Destruction’, this contradiction finds its culmination. The fascination about the breathtaking force of a blasting power, which might be the Big Bang, where all life originates from, blends with the uneasiness about the destruction, which an explosion causes that is triggered by man. Questions about parallels in contemporary, political events are subliminally posed.

The latest project of Daniel and Geo Fuchs – labeled by the artists as a "matter of the heart/labor of love" – is the "Halva Art Project". Halva is the name of a female Russian toy terrier, that has lived since October 2014 with the pair.

The project started with an oil portrait, which the painter Gertrud Fuchs, Daniels mother, painted based on a photo of Halva. Unaware of what it could turn into, the artist couple published a photo of the oil portrait on the social media platform ‘Facebook’. In response, several artist friends created their own portraits of Halva. This led Daniel and Geo Fuchs to the idea that artists of any genre create an artistic interpretation of little Halva. To realize the project the duo started, in 2015, traveling to shootings with Halva, often in their motor home.

During their, to date, unfinished journey, Halva already has been photographed by Anton Corbijn, Michael Wesely, Alfred Steffen and Olaf Heine.

In the development of this project are parallels to the journeys of Bernd and Hilla Becher in their VW bus, as well as to the travel diary of John Steinbeck "The Journey with Charley: In search of America's", who in 1960 undertook a three months journey through the USA with his 10 year old French poodle Charley in a specially designed pickup camper, to revisit and rediscover the country he had been raised in and described in his novels.

In Daniel and Geo Fuchs's project, the dog is not just company, but the purpose for the journey. The goal is to travel to various locations to meet with well-known artists who create a piece of art that shows Russian toy terrier Halva. The couple claim this project is unique in the art world in as far as Halva will be the first dog to have been photographed, painted, and drawn by a large number of artists.

== Exhibition conditions ==
During the production process of their photography series, Daniel and Geo Fuchs consider the respective form of the presentation in the exhibition room. A recurring feature is the large size/format. The large size offers the viewer the chance to pay attention to the detail of each single work. The toys in ‘Toy Giants’, fascinate because the enlarged focus is on components which are often neglected or even ignored. Signs of use like scratches or inaccurate painting during production, reveal the individual story, which each serially manufactured product might offer.

In reference to the style of a preserved body, usually kept in a glass container, the photographs of the ‘Conserving’ series are contained as Cibachrome prints behind 3/5’’ inch thick acrylic glass with polished edges, which creates a visual effect reminiscent of a medical preserved specimen floating in liquid.

== Exhibitions ==
=== Selected solo exhibitions ===
2017

- Haugar Art Museum, Tonsberg, Norwegen – "Reality Check"

2015

- Pori Art Museum Finland, Toy Giants, Forces & Explosion
- Pori Art Museum Finland, STASI – Secret Rooms

2014

- Nikolaj Kunsthal, Copenhagen, – secret rooms
- Stiftung/ Foundation Starke Foundation Starke, Löwenpalais Grunewald Berlin, STASI – secret rooms
- Schacher – Raum für Kunst Stuttgart (Space for Art, Stuttgart), STASI – secret rooms
- Gallery Molliné Stuttgart, Toy Giants
- Gallery Clairefontaine Luxemburg, FORCES

2013

- Fotografins Hus – Stockholm, STASI – secret rooms

2011

- Kunsthalle Wien, TOY GIANTS – Outer Space – within the scope of the exhibition

2010

- ARTITLED! Contemporary Art, Herpen, The Netherlands, Forest
- Galerie Magda Danysz, Paris, France, Daniel & Geo Fuchs
- ADN Galeria Barcelona, Spain, FORCES
- Young Gallery Knokke, Belgium, new works

2009

- Museo Santander, STASI – secret rooms
- Young Gallery, Brussels, Toy Giants

2008

- FOAM Fotografiemuseum (Photography Museum) Amsterdam, STASI – secret rooms
- Foundation Starke, Löwenpalais Grunewald Berlin, in liquid
- Gallery Clairefontaine Luxemburg, Toy Giants and STASI – secret rooms
- Art House Centre PasquArt / Photoforum Biel, STASI – secret rooms
- City Gallery Wolfsburg, Toy Giants

2007

- ADN Galeria Barcelona, works of a decade
- Gallery Le Lieu, Lorient, STASI – secret rooms
- Gallery dix9, Paris, STASI – secret rooms
- Gedenkstätte Deutsche Teilung (Memorial of German Division) Marienborn,
- STASI – secret rooms
- Artempus, Düsseldorf, Toy Giants
- Palau de la Virreina, Barcelona, STASI – secret rooms

2006

- Museum Villa Stuck, München, Toys
- Museum Villa Stuck, München, STASI – secret rooms
- Chronicle Forum, Leipzig, STASI – secret rooms
- City Gallery, Neunkirchen, STASI – secret rooms

2005

- Photo forum West, Innsbruck, Famous Eyes

2004

- Forum de l'Image, Toulouse, Conserving
- Kunstverein Lippe, Detmold, Famous Eyes
- Stiftung Starke, Berlin, Famous Eyes
- Photoforum PasquArt, Biel/Bienne, Conserving

2003

- Flatland Gallery, Utrecht, Famous Eyes – Conserving
- Gallery Clairefontaine, Luxembourg, Luxembourg Portraits

2002

- Art House / Barlach Halle K, Hamburg, Famous Eyes
- Photology, Milano, For your eyes only
- Gallery Clairefontaine, Luxembourg, Famous Eyes
- Camera Work, Berlin, book presentation Famous Eyes

2001

- Congress Center Saar, Saarbrücken, Conserving
- Medical-History Museum, Zürich, Conserving
- Camera Work / Berliner Medizinhistorisches Museum, Berlin, Conserving
- State Bank Berlin, slide-projection: Conserving – Rammstein

2000

- Gallery Le Réverbère, Lyon, Conserving
- Stephen Bulger Gallery, Toronto, Conserving
- Rencontres internationales de la photographie, Arles, Conserving
- Natural-History Museum, Basel, Conserving
- Photography Forum International, Frankfurt am Main, Conserving
- Galerie Nei Liicht, Dudelange, Conserving Fish
- Barlach Halle K, Hamburg, Conserving

1999

- Art House / Barlach Halle K, Hamburg, Espada

1998

- Barlach Halle K, Hamburg, Conserving Fish
- Gallery Nei Liicht, Dudelange, Espada
- gallery & edition m, Leipzig, Im falschen Körper (In the wrong body)

1997

- Schirn Kunsthalle, Frankfurt am Main, Espada
- Neue Gesellschaft für bildende Kunst (New society of fine arts), Berlin,
- Im falschen Körper (In the wrong body)
- Grundbuchhalle, Hamburg, Menschen in der Psychiatrie (Humans in Psychiatrie)

1996

- Halle K3 Kampnagel, Hamburg, Im falschen Körper (In the wrong body)

1995

- Gasteig, Munich, Im falschen Körper (In the wrong body)
- Römer, Frankfort am Main, Im falschen Körper (In the wrong body)
- Schauspiel, Frankfurt am Main, Die Unbehausten (The Homeless)

=== Selected group exhibitions and art fairs ===
Source 2015

- Brandts Museum Odense, Selfie – from self-portrait to staging the self
- Villa Merkel, Gallery of City Esslingen, Hunters & Collectors in Contemporary Art
- KunstRAI Amsterdam, Artitled Contemporary, Herten
- AAF Maastricht, Artitled Contemporary, Herten
- SAP international education center Walldorf, Thinking, Acting, Reflecting

2014

- Museum Morsbroich Leverkusen, Hunters & Collectors in Contemporary Art
- KunstRAI Amsterdam, Artitled Contemporary Herten
- Alfred-Ehrhardt-Stiftung Berlin, Wild
- LWL Industry Museum Lage, Underworlds – A Different Perspective of Things
- Riga Corner House, Riga 2014 European Capital of Culture, The (re)construction of
- friendship
- Fotografiska art fair Stockholm, Young Gallery Brussels
- Gallery Clairefontaine, Dali und artists of Gallery Clairefontaine
- Kunstrai Amsterdam, ARTITLED! Contemporary Art Herpen
- Art Karlsruhe, Gallery Clairefontaine, Luxembourg
- AAF Maastricht, ARTITLED! Contemporary Art Herpen
- Wittenstein Innovation Plant Igersheim-Harthausen, Entrepreneur 4.0

2013

- CAC Centro de Arte Contemporaneo Malaga, Art & Toys – Collection Selim Varol
- Gallery Clairefontaine, Luxembourg, looking to learn – learning to look
- Museu de Cadaques, Spain, Olor de Cadaques
- AAF Hamburg, ARTITLED! Contemporary Art, Herpen
- ADN Galeria Barcelona, 10 is more than a number
- AAF Amsterdam, ARTITLED! Contemporary Art, Herpen
- Open Art Fair Utrecht, ARTITLED! Contemporary Art, Herpen
- Art Center Maison Particulière Brussels, Sexe, Argent et Pouvoir
- AAF Brussels, ARTITLED! Contemporary Art, Herpen

2012

- Artist House k/haus Wien, Megacool 4.0
- me collectors room Berlin, Art & Toys – Collection Selim Varol
- Zona Maco Mexico, Mario Mauroner Contemporary Art Vienna
- Arco Madrid, ADN Gallery Barcelona,
- AAF Hamburg, ARTITLED! Contemporary Art, Herpen
- AAF Amsterdam, ARTITLED! Contemporary Art, Herpen
- Artfair Cologne, Toykio gallery, Düsseldorf
- Salone degli incanti ex pescheria Trieste, The Flash of Nature
- Fotofever Brussels, ARTITLED! Contemporary Art, Herpen
- Kunstrai Amsterdam, ARTITLED! Contemporary Art, Herpen
- AAF Brussels, ARTITLED! Contemporary Art, Herpen
- Toykio, Düsseldorf, permanent presentation of “Toy Giants"

2011

- ArtBo Bogota, ADN Galeria Barcelona
- FotoFever Paris, ARTITLED! Contemporary Art Herpen
- Magda Danysz Galerie, Paris, Paris Forever
- Toykio, Düsseldorf, opening exhibition
- Gallery Caprice Horn Berlin, Group Exhibition
- Arts Santa Monica Barcelona, Olor Color
- ARTI 11 Den Haag, ARTITLED! Contemporary Art Herpen
- Viennafair, Vienna, Mario Mauroner Gallery, Vienna
- TRAFFIC Dubai, THE STATE – works from the Farook Collection
- Artefiera Bologna, ADN Galeria Barcelona
- Realisme 11 Amsterdam, ARTITLED! Contemporary Art Herpen

2010

- Ludwig Forum For International Art, Aachen, Eros & Stasi
- Hardware media art club Dortmund, inter-cool 3.0
- Open Art Fair Utrecht, ARTITLED! Contemporary Art, Herpen
- ARTITLED! Contemporary Art, Herpen, Introducing! – 2009–2010
- Swiss Art Institution, Karlsruhe, Artist Duos – Artist Friends
- swab Barcelona, ADN Gallery, Barcelona
- Arco Madrid, Gallery Caprice Horn, Berlin
- The OMC Gallery for Contemporary Art, Huntington Beach, From Wall To Wall
- Art Brussels, ADN Gallery, Barcelona
- Art Hong Kong, Galerie Caprice Horn, Berlin
- Art Amsterdam, ARTITLED! Contemporary Art, Herpen

2009

- Norton Museum of Art, Palm Beach, Recent Additions to the Norton's Photography Collection
- Open Art Fair, Utrecht, ARTITLED! Contemporary Art, Berghem
- The Andy Warhol Museum Pittsburgh, The End. Analyzing Art in troubled times
- House of Cultures of the World, Berlin, Pictopia
- Affordable Art Fair, Paris, ARTITLED! Contemporary Art
- Art Amsterdam, ARTITLED! Contemporary Art, Berghem
- Fundacion Vallpalou, Lleida, Spain, "Impacte"
- Art Hong Kong, Gallery Caprice Horn, Berlin
- Art Karlsruhe, ARTITLED! Contemporary Art, Berghem
- Art Dubai, Gallery Caprice Horn, Berlin
- Affordable Art Fair, Brussels, ARTITLED! Contemporary Art, Berghem
- Art Fair Eindhoven, ARTITLED! Contemporary Art, Berghem
- Palm Beach 3 – Gallery Caprice Horn, Berlin

2008

- Photo Miami, ADN Gallery Barcelona
- Lineart Gent, ARTITLED! Contemporary Art, Berghem
- Art Paris Abu Dhabi, Gallery Caprice Horn, Berlin
- Affordable Art Fair Amsterdam, ARTITLED! Contemporary Art, Berghem
- Kiaf Korea, Gallery Caprice Horn, Berlin
- Slick Art Fair Paris, ADN Gallery Barcelona
- Slick Art Fair Paris, Gallery dix9 Paris, France
- Open Art Fair, Utrecht, ARTITLED! Contemporary Art, Berghem
- Beyond the Boundaries Gallery Caprice Horn, Berlin
- Portraits – Self-portraits, Gallery Clairefontaine, Luxembourg
- Arte Santander, ADN Gallery, Barcelona
- 5 is just a number, ADN Gallery, Barcelona
- Scope, Basel, Gallery Caprice Horn, Berlin
- Art Cologne, Gallery Clairefontaine, Luxembourg
- Art Hong Kong, Gallery Caprice Horn, Berlin
- swab Barcelona, ADN Gallery, Barcelona
- Art Brussels, ADN Gallery, Barcelona
- Art Chicago, Gallery Caprice Horn, Berlin
- Circa Puerto Rico, Gallery Caprice Horn, Berlin
- Maco Mexico, Gallery Caprice Horn, Berlin
- Arco Madrid, ADN Gallery, Barcelona
- Palm Beach art fair, GalleryCaprice Horn, Berlin

2007

- Biennale of Contemporary Art, Thessaloniki
- Ursula-Blickle-Stiftung, Kraichtal, small is beautiful
- Photo Miami, Gallery Caprice Horn, Berlin
- Photo Miami, ADN Gallery, Barcelona
- ACAF New York, Gallery Caprice Horn, Berlin
- Artempus con-temporary gallery, Reflect
- Photo Gallery Vienna, Orte mit Geschichte (Locations with History)
- Gallery Caprice Horn, Berlin – Like there is no tomorrow
- Year_07 Art Projects London, Gallery Caprice Horn, Berlin
- slick contemporary art fair Paris, ADN Gallery, Barcelona
- Modern07 Munich, Gallery Caprice Horn, Berlin
- Preview Berlin, ADN Gallery, Barcelona
- Arte Santander, ADN Gallery, Barcelona
- Gallery Caprice Horn, Berlin, Optical Titillation
- Cornice art fair, Venezia, Gallery Caprice Horn, Berlin
- swab Barcelona, ADN Galeria Barcelona
- dphoto, San Sebastian, Flatland gallery Utrecht
- Kiaf Korea, Caprice Horn Gallery, Berlin
- photo London, Gallery Caprice Horn, Berlin
- Gallery Caprice Horn, Berlin, Reality bites
- Art Brussels, ADN Gallery, Barcelona
- Art Cologne, Caprice Horn Gallery, Berlin
- Art L.A., Caprice Horn Gallery, Berlin
- The OMC Gallery, Huntington Beach, Art – Made in Germany

2006

- Palazzo Cavour, Turin, Other Families
- Vienna Biennale, Vienna
- Potsdam Museum, Auslöser Potsdam (Trigger Potsdam)
- Locarno Film Festival, Movements, Play Forward section
- Caprice Horn Gallery, Berlin, Month of Photography, Refraction
- Photo meeting Luxembourg, Gallery Clairefontaine
- Photo Miami, Caprice Horn Gallery, Berlin
- The OMC Gallery, Huntington Beach, Inauguration
- Photo New York, Caprice Horn Gallery, Berlin
- Paris Photo, Gallery Clairefontaine, Luxembourg
- Art L.A., The OMC Gallery, Huntington Beach

2005

- Museum of Photography, Braunschweig, Polaroid as Gesture
- Photo L.A., The OMC Gallery, Huntington Beach

2004

- art.fair Cologne, The OMC Gallery for Contemporary Art, Düsseldorf & Huntington Beach
- Photo L.A., Gallery Clairefontaine, Luxembourg

2003

- Kunsthal Rotterdam, Four centuries of smoking in art
- International Biennial of photography, Turin
- Photo Museum Den Haag, Mortalis
- Minerva Academy, Groningen, De Voorproef
- Stephen Bulger gallery, Toronto, Suture
- Photology, Milano, Occhio per occhio
- Gallery Clairefontaine, Luxembourg autoportrait+nus
- Paris Photo, Flatland Gallery, Utrecht
- Kunst Rai Amsterdam, Flatland Gallery, Utrecht
- Art Brussels, Gallery Clairefontaine, Luxembourg
- Art Rotterdam, Flatland Gallery, Utrecht
- Artefiera Bologna, Photology Milano

2002

- Muséum national d'histoire naturelle, Paris, Histoire naturelle
- Art Cologne, Gallery Clairefontaine, Luxembourg
- Paris Photo, Gallery Clairefontaine, Luxembourg

2001

- Aipad New York, Stephen Bulger Gallery Toronto
- Muséum d'histoire naturelle, Lyon, Carte blanche
- Fiac Paris, Gallery Le Réverbère, Lyon
- Photo Los Angeles, Stephen Bulger Gallery, Toronto

2000

- Göteborg Museum of Art, New Natural History
- Franckesche Foundation, Halle/Saale, Kinder haben Rechte (Kids have Rights)
- Electricity Plant, Tel Aviv, Prometheus
- Paris Photo, Gallery Le Révèrbere, Lyon
- Art Cologne, Lipanjepuntin Artecontemporanea, Trieste
- Art Brussels, Lipanjepuntin Artecontemporanea, Trieste
- Arco Madrid, Lipanjepuntin Artecontemporanea, Trieste
- Arte Fiera Bologna, Lipanjepuntin Artecontemporanea, Trieste

1999

- National Museum of Photography, Bradford, New Natural History
- Lipanjepuntin Artecontemporanea, Trieste, Still in motion
- Art Cologne, Lipanjepuntin Artecontemporanea, Trieste

1998

- International Photo Scene, Cologne, Espada
- Alte Völklinger Hütte, Völklingen, Prometheus
- Airport Gallery, Frankfort, Die Farbe Grün (The Color Green)
- Art Frankfort, Gallery & edition m Leipzig

== Monographs, publications, and catalogs ==
- Toy Giants, 2008
- Toy Giants, Verlag fuer Moderne Kunst Nuernberg, 2007, Nuremberg
- Luxembourg Portraits, Edition Gallery Clairefontaine, 2003
- Famous Eyes, München, 2002
- Conserving, München, 2000
- Im falschen Körper – In the wrong Body, Publisher Martina Rueger, Wiesbaden, 1995
- Stasi – secret rooms, Museum of Fine Arts Santander, 2008
- Stasi – secret rooms, City Gallery Neunkirchen, 2006

== Group exhibition catalogs ==
- 10 Years Art Station, Central Station Wolfsburg, City Gallery Wolfsburg and German Rail AG 2015
- Portraying Visions Entrepreneur 4.0 Award 2014, Publisher seltmann+sons.
- Under-Worlds – The different perspective of Things, Klartext Publishing, Essen 2014
- Gallery Clairefontaine, Looking to learn / Learning to Look, 2013
- Megacool 4.0, Art House k/haus Vienna, / <Kehrer_Verlag|Kehrer Verlag>, Kehrer Publishing 2012
- Art & Toys – Collection Selim Varol, 2012
- Eros and Stasi, Ludwig Forum for International Art, Aachen / <Kehrer_Verlag|Kehrer Verlag>, / Kehrer Publishing, 2011
- Odor Color / Smell Color, Arts Santa Monica / Catalunya, Spain /
- Universe. The Art and a dream. Kunsthalle Vienna, Verlag fuer Moderne Kunst, Publisher of Modern Art, Nuremberg 2011
- inter-cool 3.0 – Youth Visual Media, Verlag, Wilhelm Fink Publishing, 2010
- Artist Duos – Kuenstlerpaare, Swiss Art Institution, Karlsruhe, 2011.
- Humans. Locations. Times. – Photographs at the Deutsche Historische Museum, 2009
- Impacte, Coleccio Olor Visual, Fundacio Vallpalou, Lleida, Spain, 2009
- Pictoplasma / Prepare For Pictopia]a, Pictoplasma / Haus der Kulturen der Welt / House of Cultures of the World, 2009
- C – Glass Hero, Ivory Press London, 2008
- Foam Album 08, Museum for Photography, Amsterdam, 2009
- Month of Photography, Berlin, 2008
- Thessaloniki Biennale, 2007
- small is beautiful, Ursula Blickle Foundation, 2007
- Other Families, Palazzo Cavour Turin, 2006
- Trigger/ Ausloeser Potsdam, Museum Potsdam, 2006
- Photomeetings Luxembourg, Gallery Clairefontaine, Luxembourg, 2006
- Polaroid als Geste / Polaroid as Gesture, Verlag Hatje Cantz, 2005
- Rookgordijnen – Roken in de kunsten, Kunsthal Rotterdam, 2003
- In Natura, Biennale Internazionale di Fotografia, Torino, 2003
- Reality-Check, 2. Triennial of Photography, Hamburg, 2002.
- La photographie traversée, Rencontres internationales Arles, 2000
- Histoires Naturelle, Muséum National d’histoire naturelle Paris, 2002
- Carte Blanche, Muséum d’histoire naturelle Lyon, 2001
- Rammstein, Gert Hof, 2001

== Slide-projections ==
- Looking at another world/ pictures of the projects of Daniel & Geo Fuchs from 1992–2002 /
- CNA – Centre national de l'audiovisuel Luxembourg
- Conserving – Rammstein slide-projection for the first listening session of the Rammstein album Mutter (Mother)

== Documentary film ==
- Eye-Catcher – A portrait about Daniel & Geo Fuchs, New Best Friend Film Production, Frankfurt/M. 2001, 45min.

== Grants for guest artists ==
- Foundation Starke / Löwenpalais Grunewald, Berlin 2004/2005
