= Links 2 3 4 =

2001 single by Rammstein

Single by Rammstein

from the album Mutter
- B-side: "Halleluja"
- Released: 14 May 2001
- Studio: Miraval (Correns, France)
- Length: 3:36
- Label: Motor Music; Universal
- Songwriters: Richard Kruspe; Paul Landers; Till Lindemann; Christian Lorenz; Oliver Riedel; Christoph Schneider
- Producers: Jacob Hellner; Rammstein

Rammstein singles chronology
| "Sonne" (2001) | "Links 2 3 4" (2001) | "Ich will" (2001) |

Music video
- "Links 2 3 4" on YouTube

"Links 2 3 4" (also spelled "Links 2-3-4"; English: "Left 2 3 4") is a song by German Neue Deutsche Härte band Rammstein. It was released as the second single from their third studio album, Mutter, on 14 May 2001. It is a politically charged song, taking aim at early allegations of Nazism against the band by revealing that they are politically left-wing. The song was a top 40 hit in Germany, Austria, and Finland.

== Composition ==
Links, zwo, drei, vier (“Left, two, three, four”) is the usual cadence that German-speaking drill instructors use to keep a marching formation in step, “left” referring to the left foot touching the ground. The form zwo for “two” (instead of normal zwei) is an old variant that is now used in military and telephone contexts in order to avoid confusion with drei (“three”).

The title accordingly represents a militaristic theme. Moreover it is an allusion to the revolutionary song Einheitsfrontlied, written by Bertolt Brecht for the Communist Party of Germany in the 1930s and re-popularized by Hannes Wader in the German Democratic Republic.

The lyrics were written in response to allegations of fascism/Nazism directed at the band. The chorus states “they want my heart on the right, but when I look down, it beats on the left”, implying they are on the left of the political spectrum.

== Music video ==
The music video for the song uses CGI to depict an ant-colony, representing leftists, attacking beetles, representing Nazis. The ants in the video are shown doing human-like tasks such as playing football, watching television, and dancing. The band can be seen playing on a movie theater screen, a modified version of their logo with two crossed hammers is shown. During the movie theater scene the beetles attack, killing members of the ant colony. One ant is seen watching what the monstrous beetles are doing. The same ant then goes underground to rally the other ants and kill the beetles which symbolizes how the left may crush the right if they work together.

== Live story ==
The song debuted live in April 2000 on a concert just for members of the fan club. Then it was called simply "Links" and had some minor differences compared to the final version released in Mutter. It was also played during some concerts of Big Day Out 2001. When played live, it usually extends to almost five minutes because of added instrumentals. Since its debut, it has been played in virtually every Rammstein concert, exceptions being most of the shows in Big Day Out 2001 and three consecutive concerts exclusively for members of the Fan Area in October 2004.

== Track listings ==
The single has a B-side titled "Halleluja", a track frequently performed live by the band during the Mutter Tour. An early version of it is also available on the Limited Edition release of Mutter as well as the Japanese edition and Resident Evil soundtrack.

A DVD version of "Links 2 3 4" contains the audio tracks as well as a video portion with the official music video, its making-of documentary, and a photo gallery. Both videos were subsequently re-released on the Lichtspielhaus DVD.

Maxi-CD

1. "Links 2 3 4" – 3:43
2. "Halleluja" – 3:46
3. "Links 2 3 4 (Clawfinger Geradeaus Remix)" – 4:28
4. "Links 2 3 4 (Westbam Technolectro Mix)" – 5:58
5. "Links 2 3 4 (Westbam Hard Rock Cafe Bonus Mix)" – 3:43
- The 2-track CD features "Links 2 3 4" and "Halleluja"

DVD single

1. "Links 2 3 4" (audio) – 3:43
2. "Halleluja" (audio) – 3:46
3. "Links 2 3 4" (Clawfinger Geradeaus remix audio) – 4:28
4. "Links 2 3 4" (Westbam Technolectro mix audio) – 5:58
5. "Links 2 3 4" (Westbam Hard Rock Cafe Bonus mix audio) – 3:43
6. "Links 2 3 4" (video) – 3:37
7. "Links 2 3 4" (making of video) – 10:11
8. Photo gallery

== Charts ==
| Chart (2001) | Peak position |
|---|---|
| Austria (Ö3 Austria Top 40) | 33 |
| Finland (Suomen virallinen lista) | 15 |
| Germany (GfK) | 26 |
| Netherlands (Single Top 100) | 60 |
| Switzerland (Schweizer Hitparade) | 65 |

== Release history ==
| Region | Date | Format(s) | Label(s) | Ref. |
|---|---|---|---|---|
| Germany | 14 May 2001 | CD | Motor Music; Universal | |
| United States | 6 March 2001 | Mainstream rock; active rock radio | Republic; Universal | |
