= Du riechst so gut =

1995 song by Rammstein

Single by Rammstein

from the album Herzeleid
- B-side: "Wollt ihr das Bett in Flammen sehen?"; Project Pitchfork remix
- Released: 24 August 1995
- Recorded: 1994–1995
- Studio: Polar (Stockholm)
- Length: 4:50
- Label: Motor
- Songwriters: Richard Kruspe; Paul Landers; Till Lindemann; Christian Lorenz; Oliver Riedel; Christoph Schneider
- Producers: Jacob Hellner; Carl-Michael Herlöfsson

Rammstein singles chronology
"Du riechst so gut" (1995)	"Seemann" (1996)

Music video
- "Du riechst so gut" ('95) on YouTube

"Du riechst so gut" (German: [duː ˈʁiːçst zoː ˈɡuːt], "you smell so good") is a song by German Neue Deutsche Härte band Rammstein. It was released as the band's first single on 24 August 1995, also acting as the lead single from their debut studio album, Herzeleid (1995). The song describes the inner thoughts of a predator hunting his prey. The title is said to be inspired by Patrick Süskind's Perfume, a favourite novel of Till Lindemann, the band's lead singer. The single was re-released in 1998 under the name "Du riechst so gut '98", featuring a different edit of the song and a new music video.

== Music video ==
A music video was released for the song, depicting the band members shirtless in an all-white environment. The video opens with a Doberman Pinscher walking across the screen, with repeated cuts throughout of the dog looking curiously at the camera along with flowers shown in the Herzeleid album cover and this single. Till Lindemann is portrayed in simple close-up shots, sternly singing the lyrics and at one point sporting a menacing pair of goggles. The goggles known as "Schlitzbrille" were shown again in the music video for "Ohne dich".

== Live performances ==
The song was first performed during the very first Rammstein show, on 14 April 1994 in Leipzig, Germany. A fan favorite, it was used as the last song of the show during many of the Herzeleid tour concerts. During live concerts in the Sehnsucht tour, Till usually simulated firing rockets over the audience with a bow (actually propelled sitting on a string) and then the bow started to propel sparks in all directions as Till rotated it. During some concerts, he used it during different songs, like Laichzeit at the Bizarre Festival in 1997, or Du hast, during the Family Values tour in 1998. Guitarists Paul and Richard would conduct the audience during the extended solo.

The song wasn't played at all during the 2001-2002 Mutter tour, but it returned to the setlists on their Reise, Reise tour. This time, Richard and Paul wore jackets that shot flames/sparks from one of their sleeves, running from the shoulder down to their forearms; one would stand facing away from the audience, the other would stand facing the audience, and then the pyrotechnics would be activated simultaneously while the two performed the tapping hammer on solo. After being dropped for the Liebe Ist Für Alle Da tour in 2009, the song returned to the setlist on the 2010 part of the tour, and the song was occasionally performed with the pyrotechnic jackets, however this time it was done with both guitarists facing the audience.

== Track listing ==
1. Du riechst so gut (Single Version) - 4:50
2. Wollt ihr das Bett in Flammen sehen? (Album Version) - 5:19
3. Du riechst so gut (Scal Remix) by Project Pitchfork - 4:45
- The Limited Edition features a scented digipak

== Du riechst so gut '98 ==
"Du riechst so gut '98"

Single by Rammstein

from the album Sehnsucht
- B-side: Remixes
- Released: 17 April 1998
- Recorded: 1994–1995
- Studio: Polar (Stockholm)
- Length: 4:24
- Label: Motor
- Songwriters: Richard Kruspe; Paul Landers; Till Lindemann; Christian Lorenz; Oliver Riedel; Christoph Schneider
- Producers: Jacob Hellner; Rammstein

Rammstein singles chronology
"Das Modell" (1997)	"Du riechst so gut '98" (1998)	"Stripped" (1998)

On 17 April 1998, "Du riechst so gut" was re-released as a single under the title, "Du riechst so gut '98". The song retains its original arrangement, except the start is shorter.

=== Music video ===
A new music video was filmed as well. It depicts the band members as vampire creatures, who follow a young woman to a castle where a masquerade ball is taking place. They track the woman's scent, infiltrating the ball until they find her. They seduce her into being their meal, then transform into a pack of wolves, escaping as the castle's attendants pursue them. By the end of the video, it is shown that the young woman has become a vampire herself as the vampires turned her. The video first premiered on 25 May 1998. The videoclip was shot between 20 and 25 April 1998, at castle Babelsberg in Potsdam/Berlin, Jagdschloß in Berlin district Pankow and was directed by Philipp Stölzl. The video was inspired by the 1984 film The Company of Wolves.

=== Track listing ===
1. Du riechst so gut '98 - 4:24
2. Du riechst so gut (RMX By Faith No More) - 1:58
3. Du riechst so gut (RMX By Günter Schulz-KMFDM & Hiwatt Marshall) - 4:07
4. Du riechst so gut (RMX By Sascha Konietzko-KMFDM) - 4:47
5. Du riechst so gut (RMX By Olav Bruhn-Bobo in White Wooden Houses) - 4:45
6. Du riechst so gut (RMX By Sascha Moser-Bobo in White Wooden Houses) - 3:53
7. Du riechst so gut (RMX By Jacob Hellner/Marc Stagg) - 4:34
8. Du riechst so gut ("Migräne"-RMX) by Günter Schulz (KMFDM) - 5:18
9. Du riechst so gut '95 (music video)

==== Charts ====
Chart (1998)	Peak position
Germany (GfK)	16
