= Seemann (Rammstein song) =

1996 song by Rammstein

Single by Rammstein

from the album Herzeleid
- B-side: "Der Meister"; "Rammstein in the House (Timewriter-RMX)"
- Released: 8 January 1996
- Recorded: 1995
- Studio: Polar (Stockholm, Sweden)
- Length: 4:48
- Label: Motor
- Songwriters: Richard Kruspe; Paul Landers; Till Lindemann; Christian Lorenz; Oliver Riedel; Christoph Schneider
- Producers: Jacob Hellner; Carl-Michael Herlöffson

Rammstein singles chronology
"Du riechst so gut" (1995)	"Seemann" (1996)	"Engel" (1997)

"Seemann" (German pronunciation: [ˈzeːˌman]; "Seaman"/"Sailor") is a song by German band Rammstein, released as the second single from their album Herzeleid. It was composed by bass player Oliver Riedel, with lyrics by Till Lindemann.

The video shows Christoph Schneider, Oliver Riedel, Paul Landers and Richard Kruspe pulling a boat through the sand, with Till Lindemann and Flake, who's wearing a plague doctor mask, inside. Later, they decide to keelhaul Lindemann, still singing. The boat winds up in flames. The video is intertwined with shots of a woman, alternately dressed in a white robe and black clothing.

== Track listing ==
1. "Seemann" – 4:48
2. "Der Meister" – 4:10
3. "Rammstein in the House (Timewriter-RMX)" – 6:26

== Live performances ==
The first known performance of the song is from the New Year's Eve 1994–1995 concert in Saalfeld, Germany. In the Sehnsucht tour, during this song, Flake usually sat in a small inflatable boat and sailed over the crowd who waves and bring the boat back to the stage after a short tour. This stunt is now performed in "Ausländer" instead of Seemann.

Never played in the Mutter or Reise, Reise tours, "Seemann" was probably last played on 23 June 1999 in Los Angeles, California. Ten years later the song returned only on a few concerts during the Liebe ist für alle da Tour. Seemann returned as a constant song for the Festival Tour of 2016 and 2017.

== Cover versions ==
"Seemann" was covered by Finnish cello metal band Apocalyptica and featured Nina Hagen on the band's album, Reflections. It was released as a single on 6 October 2003. It was mixed and recorded by Mikko Raita. The song was also covered by Rummelsnuff along with a music clip.
