= Mutter (song) =

2002 single by Rammstein

Single by Rammstein

from the album Mutter
- B-side: "5/4"; Remixes
- Released: 25 March 2002
- Studio: Miraval (Correns, France)
- Length: 4:28
- Label: Motor • Universal
- Songwriters: Richard Kruspe; Paul Landers; Till Lindemann; Christian Lorenz; Oliver Riedel; Christoph Schneider
- Producers: Jacob Hellner; Rammstein

Rammstein singles chronology
| "Ich will" (2001) | "Mutter" (2002) | "Feuer frei!" (2002) |

Music video
- "Mutter" on YouTube

"Mutter" (German for "mother") is a song by the German band Rammstein, released as the fourth single from the album Mutter. It charted highly in Finland and Belgium.

The single release includes "5/4", an instrumental that includes a toy Speak & Spell dialogue sample.

== Overview ==
"Mutter" tells the story of a child not born from a womb but in an experiment, thus having no true father or mother. The lyrics describe his plan to kill both the mother "who never gave birth to him" and then himself. However, he fails to kill himself, instead ending up mutilated and no better off than before. The child begs and prays for strength, but his dead mother does not answer.

== Music video ==
The video for Mutter follows the story of the song, in which Lindemann portrays a monstrous character who kills his mother and then dumps her body in a river before ending up locked in an underground cage. Lindemann has a bald head and is clad in rags for this role, but also portrays a well-dressed character with long hair who is seen rowing a boat in a swamp.

== Track listing ==
1. Mutter (Radio Edit) - 3:40
2. Mutter (Vocoder Mix) - 4:32
3. 5/4 - 5:30
4. Mutter (Sono's Inkubator Mix) - 7:22
- The 2-track (card sleeve) edition included "Mutter (Radio Edit)" and "5/4".

== Charts ==
Weekly chart performance for "Mutter"
| Chart (2002) | Peak position |
|---|---|
| Belgium (Ultratop 50 Flanders) | 15 |
| Finland (Suomen virallinen lista) | 7 |
| Germany (GfK) | 47 |
| Netherlands (Single Top 100) | 69 |
