= Sehnsucht (Rammstein album) =

- One of six different cover arts for the album, with this one featuring Till Lindemann

Studio album by Rammstein
- Released: 22 August 1997
- Recorded: November 1996 – July 1997
- Studio: Temple (St. Paul's Bay)
- Genres: Neue Deutsche Härte; industrial metal
- Length: 43:51
- Label: Motor
- Producers: Jacob Hellner; Rammstein

Rammstein chronology
Herzeleid (1995)	Sehnsucht (1997)	Live aus Berlin (1999)

Singles from Sehnsucht
- 1. "Engel" Released: 1 April 1997; 2. "Du hast" Released: 19 July 1997; 3. "Sehnsucht" Released: 25 August 1997; 4. "Du riechst so gut '98" Released: 17 April 1998

Professional ratings
Review scores
Source	Rating
AllMusic	4/5 stars
Christgau's Consumer Guide	(neither)
Pitchfork	2.9/10
Q	3/5 stars
Rolling Stone	4/5 stars
Rock Hard	9.0/10
Spin	5/10
Sputnikmusic	4.5/5

Sehnsucht (German pronunciation: [ˈzeːnˌzʊxt]; "Desire" or "Longing") is the second studio album by German Neue Deutsche Härte band Rammstein. It was released on 22 August 1997, through Motor Music in Europe and Slash Records in the United States. It is the only album entirely in German to be certified platinum by the RIAA in the US. The album peaked at No. 1 on the Austrian and German charts.

In 2020, Metal Hammer included it in their list of Top 10 1997 Albums.

The songs on Sehnsucht are dark, and often about sexuality. For example, Küss mich is about oral sex, Spiel mit mir about incest, and Bück dich and Bestrafe mich are about sadomasochism.

The album also explores other dark themes, such as obsessive jealousy (Eifersucht) and painful longing (Sehnsucht).

The sound of Sehnsucht is strongly influenced by industrial music, with heavy guitar riffs and cold, raw, mechanical synthesizer sounds. The album also features many of the elements that became characteristic of Rammstein's musical style.

== Cover art ==
The album booklet folds out to reveal six different covers, one for each band member (each photo depicting the member with vintage medical / surgical instruments). The cover most commonly seen shows Christoph Schneider with a barbed-wire-laced worn as an oral gag and his eyes rolled back into his head. The cover art was created by Austrian artist Gottfried Helnwein, who also created the cover for the Scorpions' Blackout album, which the Sehnsucht cover resembles.

== Track listing ==
All tracks are written by Rammstein.

No.	Title	Length
1.	"Sehnsucht" ("Desire"/"Longing")	4:04
2.	"Engel" ("Angel"; featuring Bobo)	4:24
3.	"Tier" ("Animal")	3:47
4.	"Bestrafe mich" ("Punish Me")	3:38
5.	"Du hast" ("You Have" (Note: The spoken form of the title is a play on homophones (in German) that mean "you have" ("du hast", the translation of the written form) and "you hate" ("du hasst"); the English version uses "you hate" in the lyrics.))	3:55
6.	"Bück dich" ("Bend Over")	3:22
7.	"Spiel mit mir" ("Play with Me")	4:46
8.	"Klavier" ("Piano")	4:24
9.	"Alter Mann" ("Old Man")	4:24
10.	"Eifersucht" ("Jealousy")	3:37
11.	"Küss mich (Fellfrosch)" ("Kiss Me (Fur Frog)")	3:30
Total length:		43:51

=== Special editions ===
Multiple special editions of Sehnsucht were released, offering different bonus tracks:

- The following songs as tracks 12 and 13 for the North American and Japanese releases:
  - "Engel (English Version)"
  - "Du hast (English Version)"
  - These songs are also included on micro-cassettes, and may be hidden tracks on certain editions.
- "Du riechst so gut '98" as track 12. A version also includes the video for "Du riechst so gut '98".
- Polish cassettes included a short Polish introduction to the album, spoken by Till.
- A limited edition release in Europe features 14 tracks:
  - "Rammstein (Eskimos & Egypt Radio Edit)"
  - "Du riechst so gut '98"
  - "Du hast (Remix by Clawfinger)"
- "Stripped" as a twelfth track, which may be included on the micro-cassette version and/or be included as a hidden track.
- "Stripped" as a twelfth track and the "Asche zu Asche" single as a second CD. The "Asche zu Asche" single may be included on the first CD to make a total of 18 tracks.
- A 2001 Australian Tour Edition, which had "Stripped" as a twelfth track, and a second CD with the "Asche zu Asche" single as the first track, followed by five live songs.

=== Anniversary Edition ===
On 15 April 2023, Rammstein released a short teaser to their social media channels, showing the album's various front covers along to the intro of Bück dich. A day later, another teaser was posted, with footage of the band rehearsing Engel on 18 April 1997. The caption of that video announced the "Sehnsucht Anniversary Edition". On 17 April 2023, a third teaser followed, including footage from Live aus Berlin and the announcement, that the pre-order of the anniversary edition would start the next day, 19 April.

The Anniversary Edition was scheduled for release on 9 June 2023.

Besides being remastered, the album features an exclusive new mix of Spiel mit mir, titled "2023 Mix", and a 40 page booklet with previously unreleased photos of Gottfried Helnwein.

== Personnel ==
Personnel taken from Sehnsucht CD booklet.

- Rammstein – production, programming
  - Till Lindemann
  - Richard Kruspe
  - Paul Landers
  - Oliver Riedel
  - Christian "Flake" Lorenz
  - Christoph Schneider
- Jacob Hellner – production
- Ronald Prent – mixing
- Bobo – vocals on "Engel"
- Mark Stagg – additional programming
- Björn Engelmann – mastering
- Gottfried Helnwein – photography, portrait photography
- Dirk Rudolph – cover design, sleeve design

== Charts ==
=== Weekly charts ===
Weekly chart performance for Sehnsucht
Chart (1997–2023)	Peak position
Australian Albums (ARIA)	25
Austrian Albums (Ö3 Austria)	1
Belgian Albums (Ultratop Flanders)	36
Canada Top Albums/CDs (RPM)	25
Dutch Albums (Album Top 100)	28
Europe (European Top 100 Albums)	7
Finnish Albums (Suomen virallinen lista)	13
French Albums (SNEP)	76
German Albums (Offizielle Top 100)	1
Hungarian Albums (MAHASZ)	28
Lithuanian Albums (AGATA)	7
New Zealand Albums (RMNZ)	23
Norwegian Albums (VG-lista)	23
Swedish Albums (Sverigetopplistan)	17
Swiss Albums (Schweizer Hitparade)	3
US Billboard 200	45

=== Year-end charts ===
Year-end chart performance for Sehnsucht
Chart (1997)	Position
Austrian Albums (Ö3 Austria)	16
Europe (European Top 100 Albums)	53
German Albums (Offizielle Top 100)	6
Swiss Albums (Schweizer Hitparade)	40
Chart (1998)	Position
German Albums (Offizielle Top 100)	40
US Billboard 200	161

== Certifications ==
Certifications for Sehnsucht
Region	Certification	Certified units/sales
Austria (IFPI Austria)	Platinum	50,000^{*}
Canada (Music Canada)	Platinum	100,000^{^}
Germany (BVMI)	5× Gold	1,250,000^{‡}
Netherlands (NVPI)	Gold	50,000^{^}
New Zealand (RMNZ)	Gold	7,500^{‡}
Poland (ZPAV)	Gold	50,000^{*}
Switzerland (IFPI Switzerland)	2× Platinum	100,000^{^}
United Kingdom (BPI)	Gold	100,000^{‡}
United States (RIAA)	Platinum	1,000,000^{^}
Summaries
Europe (IFPI)	Platinum	1,000,000^{*}
^{*} Sales figures based on certification alone.^{^} Shipments figures based on certification alone.^{‡} Sales+streaming figures based on certification alone.
