= Ich will =

2001 single by Rammstein

Single by Rammstein

from the album Mutter
- B-side: "Pet Sematary" (Live); "Halleluja"; Remixes
- Released: 10 September 2001
- Recorded: 2001
- Studio: Miraval (Correns, France)
- Length: 3:37
- Label: Motor • Universal
- Songwriters: Richard Kruspe; Paul Landers; Till Lindemann; Christian Lorenz; Oliver Riedel; Christoph Schneider
- Producers: Jacob Hellner; Rammstein

Rammstein singles chronology
| "Links 2 3 4" (2001) | "Ich will" (2001) | "Mutter" (2002) |

Music video
- "Ich will" on YouTube

"Ich will" (German pronunciation: [ɪç ˈvɪl], "I Want") is a song by German Neue Deutsche Härte band Rammstein from their third studio album Mutter. It was originally released in Germany in 2001. The German single contains a live cover of the Ramones song "Pet Sematary" sung by Rammstein keyboardist Christian "Flake" Lorenz. It is the walk-on song for Martin Schindler for the European Tour.

== Music video ==
The music video of "Ich will" features the band members staging a bank robbery, making it seem as realistic as possible. The video shows both the robbery and its aftermath, and moves between these two scenes.

During the robbery scenes, the band is shown entering a bank wearing stockings over their heads, except for Flake, who has a very large and elaborate bomb strapped to his chest. They quickly remove their masks and head for the front desk. A bank employee reaches for the panic button, but she is seen by Richard, who presses her hand against the button, intentionally triggering the alarm.

The woman faints, and Richard dances with her unconscious body until Ollie confirms that the police and media have arrived. The group continues to terrorize the hostages and vandalize the bank, while also fantasizing about the media storm when they exit. In another room, Till is giving a live interview to the press, who appear to be slain in the next scene, though the broadcast continues.

As the band, excluding Flake, exit the bank unarmed, they are swarmed by members of the Spezialeinsatzkommando instead of the media as anticipated. Despite this, the band seems to revel in the attention they are getting, and shortly after the timer on Flake's bomb reaches zero. The video quickly flicks through a series of short clips from some of Rammstein's other music videos, then comes to an end.

During the aftermath scenes, the band, Flake excluded, emerges from a police bus wearing shackles and prison attire. They are escorted by guards down a red carpet surrounded by a large cheering crowd and many cameras, toward a podium where they receive a Goldene Kamera (Golden Camera) award, a German version of the Emmy award. Behind the podium is the main entrance of the bank they destroyed earlier, with a large sepia picture of Flake over the door. Most of the "aftermath" is shown at the beginning of the clip, although it is revisited later.

In an interview, Rammstein described the music video of "Ich will" as being a demonstration of the media's obsession with a good story, as well as an illustration of the immortality that can be achieved by those who commit wrongs. The video was filmed in Berlin in the former State Council of the German Democratic Republic building (Staatsratsgebäude) which now houses the European School of Management and Technology.

== Live story ==
Along with "Nebel", "Ich will" was the only song from Mutter that was not played live in its demo form in the concert for members of the Fan Area in April 2000. Instead, it debuted on 1 May 2001, in another concert for members of the Fan Area. When played live, explosions are part of the performance, and it usually closes the show during festivals. It has been played paired with "Sonne" during the encores in every Rammstein concert up until Made in Germany 1995–2011 (tour), where "Sonne" opened the show while "Ich will" maintained its position in the encore.

== Track listing ==
Maxi-single

1. Ich will (Album Version) – 3:37
2. Ich will (Live Preussag Arena, Hannover, Germany on 1 June 2001) – 4:17
3. Ich will (Westbam Mix) – 6:19
4. Ich will (Paul van Dyk Mix) – 6:13
5. Pet Sematary (Performed live with Clawfinger) – 6:31
6. Ich will (Live CD-R Track) – 4:05
- Comes as a 2-track CD with Ich will (Album Version) and Ich will (Live).

UK CD Part 1 (Red Cover)

1. Ich will (Radio Edit)
2. Links 2 3 4 (Clawfinger Geradeaus Remix) – 4:28
3. Du hast (Remix By Jacob Hellner) – 6:44
4. Ich will (Video) – 4:05

UK CD Part 2 (Green Cover)

1. Ich will (Radio Edit)
2. Halleluja – 3:45
3. Stripped (Heavy Mental Mix By Charlie Clouser) – 5:18

UK DVD Part 3 (Orange Cover)

- Ich will (Live Video Version)
- 4 x 30 Seconds Video Clips
  - Bück dich
  - Rammstein
  - Wollt ihr das Bett in Flammen sehen?
  - Asche zu Asche
- Photo Gallery (10 Shots)
- 2 x Audio Tracks
  - Feuerräder (Live Demo Version 1994)
  - Rammstein (Live)

== Charts ==
2001–2002 chart performance for "Ich will"
| Chart (2001–2002) | Peak position |
|---|---|
| Austria (Ö3 Austria Top 40) | 59 |
| Finland (Suomen virallinen lista) | 19 |
| Germany (GfK) | 29 |
| Netherlands (Single Top 100) | 52 |
| Scotland Singles (Official Charts) | 22 |
| Spain (Promusicae) | 19 |
| UK Singles (Official Charts) | 30 |
| UK Rock & Metal (Official Charts) | 2 |

2022 chart performance for "Ich will"
| Chart (2022) | Peak position |
|---|---|
| Hungary (Single Top 40) | 38 |

2023 chart performance for "Ich will"
| Chart (2023) | Peak position |
|---|---|
| Lithuania (AGATA) | 93 |

== Certifications ==
Certifications for "Ich will"
| Region | Certification | Certified units/sales |
|---|---|---|
| Denmark (IFPI Danmark) | Gold | 45,000^{‡} |
| Germany (BVMI) | Gold | 250,000^{‡} |
^{‡} Sales+streaming figures based on certification alone.
