= Michael Wesely =

German art photographer (born 1963)

- Born: 1963 (age 62–63); Munich, Germany
- Occupation: Art photographer
- Known for: Special ultra-long exposure technique

Michael Wesely (born 1963 in Munich) is a German art photographer who is best known for his photos of cities, buildings, landscapes, and still lives of flowers taken with a special ultra-long exposure technique. Michael Wesely lives and works in Berlin.

== Life ==
From 1986 to 1988, Michael Wesely attended the Bayerische Staatslehranstalt für Photographie at Munich, before taking up studies at the Munich Academy of Fine Arts with Heribert Sturm and James Reineking.

== Works ==
Wesely employed a self-made special pinhole camera for photographing scenes of profound and quick development such as the reconstruction of Berlin Potsdamer Platz in the years after the fall of the Berlin Wall in the late 1990s. In contrast, he later made pictures of still East German and American landscapes showing wide fields and the sky above. During the reconstruction of New York Museum of Modern Art (MoMA), Wesely took photos recording the change in architecture. This was called the Open Shutter project, shown at the MoMA in 2004. Together with Lina Kim, he later photographed the Brazilian capital Brasília.

== Reception ==
Wesely's works deal with the subject of time and the change that takes place over time. Due to the extremely long exposure and the special bulb he uses, those elements that move the least dominate his images, while those moving will later be seen as transparent figures or the outlines of newly erect buildings overlapping. The pictures "reveal the passage of time by showing the changing skyline, the skeletons of cranes. the rise of new buildings, and the disappearance of others. Beams of sunlight, the residue of the ever-changing positions (tithe earth and sun, are also evident, like a palimpsest of seasons". Everything that ever happened on the scene during exposure (during weeks, months, or even up to two or three years) will be seen in one single picture. Wesely's photographs have been described as a metaphor on the change of Berlin after 1989 because "at once strikingly energetic and ghostly and uninhabited. This formal paradox aptly describes Berlin, which had only been unified for ten years at the time the images were taken. In that way, the photographs offer a larger commentary on time's passage."

== Scholarships ==
- 1995: Scholarship by the German Academic Exchange Service DAAD for the Netherlands
- 1996: Work scholarship of the Stiftung Kunstfonds at Bonn
- 1999: Scholarship for United States by the Free State of Bavaria

== Selected publications ==
- Vereinte Versicherung AG (ed.): Michael Wesely, American landscape. Storms. Munich. 2000. ISBN 3-927533-26-2
- Galerie Fahnemann. Autor Philippe van Cauteren (eds.): Ostdeutschland = East Germany. König. Köln. 2004. ISBN 3-88375-849-3
- Time works. Schirmer Mosel. Munich. 2010. ISBN 978-3-8296-0513-7
- Hubertus von Amelunxen, Ludwig Seyfarth, Dorothee von Windheim: Michael Wesely Portraits 1988–2013. Distanz. Berlin. 2013. ISBN 978-3-95476-043-5
