= Engel (song) =

1997 song by Rammstein

Single by Rammstein

from the album Sehnsucht
- B-side: "Sehnsucht"; "Rammstein"; "Feuerräder"; "Wilder Wein"
- Released: 1 April 1997
- Recorded: 1996–1997
- Studio: Temple (Mistra, Malta)
- Genre: Neue Deutsche Härte; industrial metal
- Length: 4:24
- Label: Motor
- Songwriters: Richard Kruspe; Paul Landers; Till Lindemann; Christian Lorenz; Oliver Riedel; Christoph Schneider
- Producers: Jacob Hellner; Rammstein

Rammstein singles chronology
"Seemann" (1996)	"Engel" (1997)	"Du hast" (1997)

Music video
- "Engel" on YouTube

"Engel" (German pronunciation: [ˈɛŋl̩]; "Angel" or "Angels") is a song by German Neue Deutsche Härte band Rammstein. It was released in April 1997 as the first single from their second album, Sehnsucht. The female part of song's chorus is sung by Christiane "Bobo" Hebold of the German pop band Bobo in White Wooden Houses. An English version of "Engel" can be found on US special editions of Sehnsucht. According to an interview, keyboardist Christian Lorenz came up with the main riff for this song on a synthesizer along with a whistle melody.

== Music video ==
While Lindemann, Schneider and Flake are in the audience, Paul Landers can be seen taking Schneider's place by playing the drums and Kruspe and Riedel are seen singing. The video references the 1996 film, From Dusk till Dawn.

== Live performances ==
A regular during the Sehnsucht tour, it was used as the last song of the main set in non-festival concerts. In the first months of the Mutter (2001) tour, "Engel" appeared in the setlists sporadically, but became a regular again in November, and continued as the last song of the main set until the end of the tour.

When performed on stage, flames were shot into the air, and Schneider's drumsticks would shoot sparks. In the "Live aus Berlin" shows, Bobo joined Rammstein to sing her parts from inside a flaming cage, instead of the usual pre-recorded chorus used in most of the shows. Having been excluded in the entire Reise, Reise tour, "Engel" returned to the setlists as the closing song of the Liebe ist für alle da tour, taking place during 2009 and 2011. This time around, vocalist Till Lindemann sang the chorus instead of Bobo's pre-recorded lines. For the pyrotechnics, Lindemann wears a set of angel wings that shoot flames from the tips and have sparks go off along them. "Engel" was the penultimate song on the setlist during the Made in Germany 1995-2011 tour, and the tour in 2016.

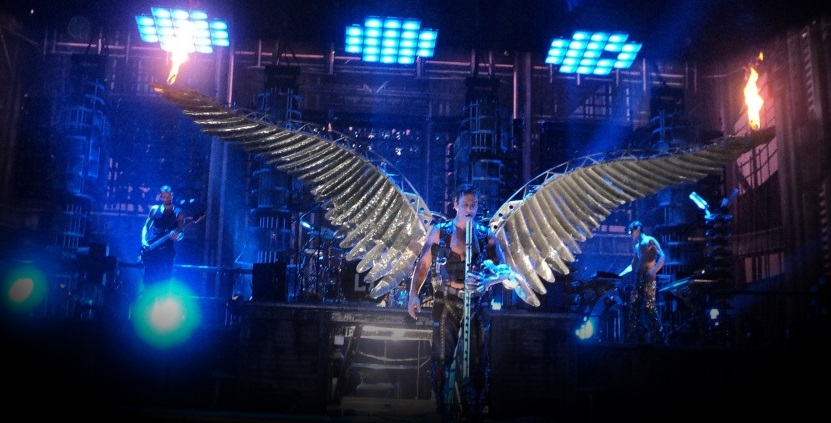
Engel in the LIFAD Tour

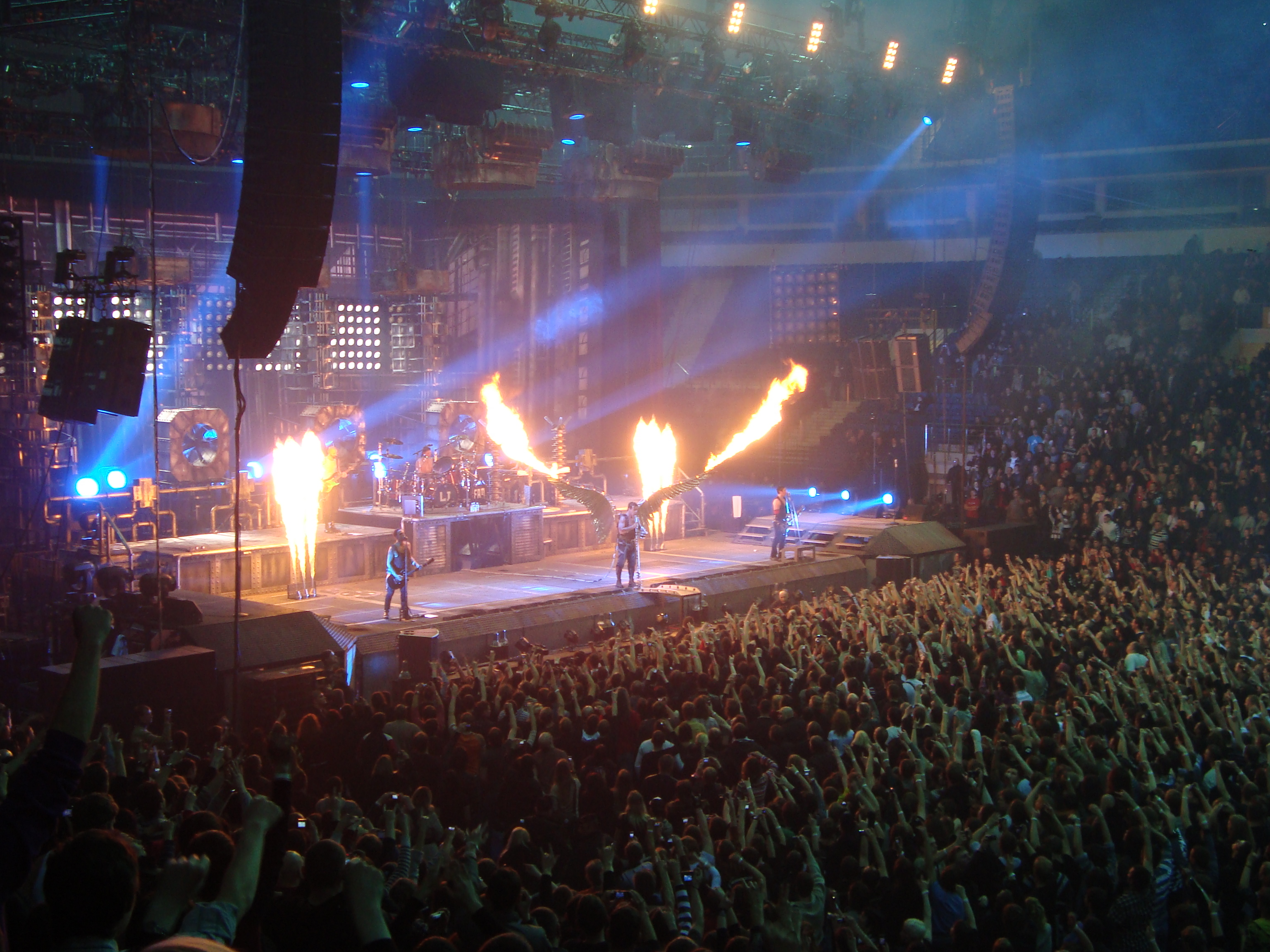
Rammstein playing "Engel" in Minsk, Belarus

== In other media ==
The song was used during the end credits of the 1997 film, Mortal Kombat Annihilation, and also appears on its soundtrack.

== Track listings ==
=== Single ===
All lyrics by Till Lindemann.

1. Engel - 4:23 (music: Christian Lorenz)
2. Sehnsucht - 4:02 (music: Richard Kruspe, Christian Lorenz)
3. Rammstein (Eskimos & Egypt Radio Edit) - 3:40 (music: Richard Kruspe)
4. Rammstein (Eskimos & Egypt Instrumental Edit) - 3:32
5. Rammstein - 4:25

=== Fan-Edition ===
A second single called Engel (Fan-Edition) was released on 23 May 1997. It includes different track listing from the original and a different artwork, showing singer Till Lindemann.

1. Engel (Extended Version) - 4:34
2. Feuerräder (Live Demo Version 1994) - 4:47
3. Wilder Wein (Demo Version 1994) - 5:41
4. Rammstein (Eskimos & Egypt Instrumental) - 3:27

== Charts ==
=== Weekly charts ===
Weekly chart performance for "Engel"
Chart (1997)	Peak position
Austria (Ö3 Austria Top 40)	4
Europe (Eurochart Hot 100)	12
Germany (GfK)	3
Sweden (Sverigetopplistan)	48
Switzerland (Schweizer Hitparade)	17

2023 weekly chart performance for "Engel"
Chart (2023)	Peak position
Lithuania (AGATA)	48

=== Year-end charts ===
Year-end chart performance for "Engel"
Chart (1997)	Position
Austria (Ö3 Austria Top 40)	23
Europe (Eurochart Hot 100)	78
Germany (Media Control)	11

== Certifications ==
Region	Certification	Certified units/sales
Germany (BVMI)	Platinum	600,000^{‡}
^{‡} Sales+streaming figures based on certification alone.
