= Mutter (album) =

Studio album by Rammstein
- Released: 2 April 2001
- Recorded: May–June 2000
- Studio: Miraval (Correns)
- Genres: Neue Deutsche Härte; industrial metal
- Length: 45:02
- Labels: Motor; Universal
- Producers: Jacob Hellner; Rammstein

Rammstein chronology
Live aus Berlin (1999)	Mutter (2001)	Reise, Reise (2004)

Singles from Mutter
- 1. "Sonne" Released: 12 February 2001; 2. "Links 2 3 4" Released: 14 May 2001; 3. "Ich will" Released: 10 September 2001; 4. "Mutter" Released: 25 March 2002; 5. "Feuer frei!" Released: 14 October 2002; 6. "Mein Herz brennt" Released: 7 December 2012

Mutter (German pronunciation: [ˈmʊtɐ]; English: "Mother") is the third studio album by German Neue Deutsche Härte band Rammstein. It was released on 2 April 2001 through Motor and Universal Music. The album's cover image is a photograph of a dead fetus, which was taken by Daniel & Geo Fuchs. The album has yielded six singles which, to date, are the most released from any Rammstein album.

== Writing and recording ==
From September to December 1999, the band rented the house Weimar in Heiligendamm on the Baltic Sea for pre-production. The sound recordings took place in May and June 2000 at Studio Miraval in southern France. In advance of the album's release, Rammstein released the song "Links 2 3 4" on their website for download in December 2000. The single "Sonne" was released in January 2001.

== Versions ==
"Mutter" was released in various versions, initially as a normal CD and, in Germany, also as a vinyl LP. A digipack was also released, which was exported to other countries. Another double CD edition with the video of ‘Sonne’ and the track Halleluja was released in the USA. The Japanese version contains Halleluja two minutes later—as a so-called ‘hidden track’—after the end of the regular CD. The album was later released as a limited tour edition, which contains four live tracks on a second CD. The cover remained unchanged, except for the colour, which became red.
A vinyl pressing of the Japanese version has existed since 2013, but it is merely a bootleg, or more precisely, a counterfeit. It also contains the song Halleluja, but in two different versions: Once as Halleluja (with choirs at the beginning) and once as ‘Halleluja’ (without choirs at the beginning).

== Critical reception and legacy ==
Professional ratings
Review scores
Source	Rating
AllMusic	4.5/5 stars
Alternative Press	4/5 stars
The Austin Chronicle	3.5/5 stars
Blender	3/5 stars
Drowned in Sound	8/10
Entertainment Weekly	B+
NME	5/10
Rolling Stone	3.5/5 stars
Spin	6/10
Sputnikmusic	5/5

In 2005, Mutter was ranked number 324 in Rock Hard magazine's book The 500 Greatest Rock & Metal Albums of All Time.

In the interview with Noizr Zine, the well-known Swedish producer and musician Peter Tägtgren advised "Mutter" as a reference work for beginner producers:

"I think, if you are not into death metal or something like that, but if you are into metal, I would say maybe Rammstein’s "Mutter" is very good, because it has a lot of different elements, it has orchestra parts, heavy guitars, good drum sound — that could be a good reference."

== Track listing ==
All tracks are written by Rammstein.

No.	Title	Length
1.	"Mein Herz brennt" ("My Heart Burns")	4:39
2.	"Links 2 3 4" ("Left 2 3 4")	3:36
3.	"Sonne" ("Sun")	4:32
4.	"Ich will" ("I Want")	3:37
5.	"Feuer frei!" ("Open Fire!")	3:11
6.	"Mutter" ("Mother")	4:32
7.	"Spieluhr" ("Music Box")	4:46
8.	"Zwitter" ("Hermaphrodite")	4:17
9.	"Rein raus" ("In Out")	3:09
10.	"Adiós" ("Goodbye")	3:49
11.	"Nebel" ("Fog")	4:54
Total length:		45:02

There are various editions of Mutter, each with different features:

- The Limited Tour Edition had the same cover, but red with the Rammstein logo embossed on the front. It also had a second CD with the following live tracks:
1. "Ich will" – 3:57
2. "Links 2 3 4" – 4:54
3. "Sonne" – 4:42
4. "Spieluhr" – 5:27
- The Japanese edition had "Halleluja" as a hidden track, found after "Nebel" (there is a two-minute intermission of silence). The track was later included in the Resident Evil soundtrack, but does not appear in the film.
- The limited edition had a second CD with just one track, "Halleluja", and a CD-ROM area featuring the "Sonne" video. There is a spelling error on the back album track listing: it is listed as "Hallelujah" but the bonus CD itself has the song listed as "Halleluja", which is the correct spelling.
- A 12" vinyl version and a MC version were released, with the same track list (Side A = 1–6; B = 7–11)
- The Limited Tour Edition was also released as a double cassette set, with the second cassette containing the live tracks (Side A = 1–2; B = 3–4).
- The Turkish cassette release of the album fades all songs out at 3:44.

Note: Some copies that have "Halleluja" as a hidden track can not be played for unknown reasons. On 3 April 2010 Rammstein posted a video with an official translation of "Halleluja" on their Facebook page, "in light of recent events".

== Personnel ==
=== Rammstein ===
- Till Lindemann – vocals
- Richard Kruspe – lead guitar
- Paul Landers – rhythm guitar
- Christian Lorenz – keyboards
- Oliver Riedel – bass
- Christoph Schneider – drums

=== Guest musicians ===
- Bobo – background vocals on "Nebel"
- Khira Li Lindemann – additional vocals on "Spielhur"
- Olsen Involtini – string arrangements on "Mein Herz brennt", "Mutter" and "Nebel"
- Orchestra parts by the Deutsches Filmorchester Babelsberg, conducted by Gunter Joseck
- Samples on "Sonne" courtesy of Spectrasonic's "Symphony of Voices"

=== Production ===
- Jacob Hellner – production
- Rammstein – production
- Ulf Kruckenberg – engineer
- Dirk Rudolph – sleeve design
- Daniel & Geo Fuchs – photography

== Charts ==
=== Weekly charts ===
Weekly chart performance for Mutter
Chart (2001)	Peak position
Australian Albums (ARIA)	10
Austrian Albums (Ö3 Austria)	1
Belgian Albums (Ultratop Flanders)	7
Belgian Albums (Ultratop Wallonia)	45
Canadian Albums (Billboard)	14
Danish Albums (Hitlisten)	22
Dutch Albums (Album Top 100)	4
Europe (European Top 100 Albums)	2
Finnish Albums (Suomen virallinen lista)	7
French Albums (SNEP)	23
German Albums (Offizielle Top 100)	1
Hungarian Albums (MAHASZ)	33
New Zealand Albums (RMNZ)	12
Norwegian Albums (VG-lista)	12
Polish Albums (ZPAV)	4
Scottish Albums (Official Charts)	52
Spanish Albums (AFYVE)	9
Swedish Albums (Sverigetopplistan)	2
Swiss Albums (Schweizer Hitparade)	1
UK Albums (Official Charts)	86
UK Rock & Metal Albums (Official Charts)	86
US Billboard 200	77

2023 weekly chart performance for Mutter
Chart (2023)	Peak position
Hungarian Albums (MAHASZ)	22
Lithuanian Albums (AGATA)	3

2025 weekly chart performance for Mutter
Chart (2025)	Peak position
US World Albums (Billboard)	21

2026 weekly chart performance for Mutter
Chart (2026)	Peak position
Portuguese Streaming Albums (AFP)	197

=== Year-end charts ===
Chart (2001)	Position
Austrian Albums (Ö3 Austria)	13
Belgian Albums (Ultratop Flanders)	21
Dutch Albums (Album Top 100)	54
Europe (European Top 100 Albums)	38
German Albums (Offizielle Top 100)	3
Swiss Albums (Schweizer Hitparade)	37

Chart (2002)	Position
Dutch Albums (Album Top 100)	57

Chart (2019)	Position
Belgian Albums (Ultratop Flanders)	124

Chart (2021)	Position
Belgian Albums (Ultratop Flanders)	193

Chart (2022)	Position
Austrian Albums (Ö3 Austria)	73
Belgian Albums (Ultratop Flanders)	106
German Albums (Offizielle Top 100)	83

Chart (2023)	Position
Austrian Albums (Ö3 Austria)	73
Belgian Albums (Ultratop Flanders)	117
German Albums (Offizielle Top 100)	82

Chart (2024)	Position
Belgian Albums (Ultratop Flanders)	105
German Albums (Offizielle Top 100)	87

Chart (2025)	Position
Belgian Albums (Ultratop Flanders)	168

== Certifications ==
Certifications and sales for Mutter
Region	Certification	Certified units/sales
Austria (IFPI Austria)	Gold	20,000^{*}
Belgium (BRMA)	Gold	25,000^{*}
Denmark (IFPI Danmark)	2× Platinum	40,000^{‡}
Finland (Musiikkituottajat)	Gold	15,193
Germany (BVMI)	7× Gold	1,050,000^{‡}
Iceland	—	8,960
Italy (FIMI)	Gold	25,000^{‡}
Mexico (AMPROFON)	Gold	75,000^{^}
Netherlands (NVPI)	Gold	40,000^{^}
Norway (IFPI Norway)	Gold	25,000^{*}
Poland (ZPAV)	Platinum	40,000^{*}
Spain (Promusicae)	3× Platinum	300,000^{^}
Sweden (GLF)	Gold	40,000^{^}
Switzerland (IFPI Switzerland)	Platinum	40,000^{^}
United Kingdom (BPI)	Gold	100,000^{^}
^{*} Sales figures based on certification alone.^{^} Shipments figures based on certification alone.^{‡} Sales+streaming figures based on certification alone.
