= Jacob Hellner =

Swedish music producer (born 1961)

- Born: March 19, 1961 (age 64)
- Origin: Sweden
- Genres: Metal; hard rock; pop; hip hop; electronic
- Occupations: Record producer; engineer; record mixer; composer
- Instruments: Guitar; drums; keyboards
- Years active: 1986–present
- Member of: Bright & Black
- Formerly of: BomKrash

Jacob Hellner (born 19 March 1961) is a Swedish record producer, songwriter and composer. As a producer, he has worked with acts in the metal, rock, pop, hip hop and electronic genres. Hellner is best known for his extensive collaboration with German metal band Rammstein, which saw him produce every album released by the band from Herzeleid (1995) to Paris (2017), and assisting in the production of albums from Rammstein members' side projects Emigrate and Lindemann. He is currently a member of the project Bright & Black and was previously part of the Swedish production duo BomKrash together with Carl-Michael Herlöfsson.

== Career ==
Hellner began his musical career in 1986 and first worked at a San Francisco-based studio in the United States. Prior to entering the music business, he worked as a teacher in computer technology and programs. Hellner returned to Sweden in the late 1980s and started producing Swedish pop and hip hop acts. His international breakthrough came with the release of rap metal band Clawfinger's debut album, Deaf Dumb Blind, in 1993. The album's recognition led to an offer from the German label Motor Music to produce one of their bands, Rammstein. Hellner was not immediately convinced to accept the offer after hearing the band's first demo, but changed his mind after seeing them perform live in Hamburg. Upon meeting each other, Hellner and the band members learned that they were inspired by many of the same artists, including Pantera, Metallica, The Prodigy, Ministry and Depeche Mode.

Rammstein's debut album, Herzeleid, was recorded in Stockholm at Polar Studios and Hellner's own studio BomKrash in the spring of 1995. The studio sessions proved to be a struggle due to the cultural differences and language barriers, but Dutch engineer Ronald Prent was brought in by Hellner to serve as a middleman between the band and the producer. Herzeleid faced a slow reception, but received a major popularity boost internationally in 1997 when two songs from the album were picked by director David Lynch for the soundtrack to his movie Lost Highway. Despite the tensions during the making of their debut album, Rammstein asked Hellner to produce their second album and the following studio sessions in Malta proved to be a more relaxing process than their first collaboration. Sehnsucht was released in 1997 and became a major international success, spearheaded by the singles "Engel" and "Du Hast", the latter being nominated for the Grammy Award for Best Metal Performance in 1999.

During the making of Rammstein's third album, Mutter, conflicts within the band were at an all-time high and Hellner later stated that listening to the mastered album was one of the most satisfying moments of his career. In 2006, Rammstein were nominated for a second Grammy Award for their single "Mein Teil" off their 2004 album Reise, Reise. During Rammstein's hiatus in 2006, Hellner co-produced the band's lead guitarist Richard Z. Kruspe's side project Emigrate and their debut album. In 2007, Hellner produced the Finnish symphonic metal band Apocalyptica's album Worlds Collide, a collaboration he later called one of the highlights of his career. Hellner was an executive producer on Dead by April's album Incomparable in 2011. He contributed post-production on Till Lindemann's side-project Lindemann's debut album in 2015 and produced the Entombed-spinoff band Entombed A.D. the following year.

In 2017, Hellner and Rammstein parted ways after the release of the live album Paris, which had been in production for five years, and ended a partnership that had spanned a twenty three-year period and included six studio albums, three live albums and one greatest hits album. Hellner stated that the split was amicable and later attended the release party for the band's seventh studio album. Mixing engineer Ronald Prent, who worked on Rammstein's first three albums, later praised Hellner's role as a producer and his contribution to the band: "The band has great ideas, great riffs, and Till writes amazing lyrics and controls the German language like no other… but Jacob was the common denominator that brought it together into a song". In 2018, Hellner composed the soundtrack for the Swedish television series Moscow Noir. During that same year, he formed the metal and classical project Bright & Black, featuring conductor Kristjan Järvi, the Baltic Sea Philharmonic and Eicca Toppinen of Apocalyptica. In a 2020 interview with Loudwire, Hellner stated that he had moved away from producing records due to dissatisfaction with the state of the music business and instead pursued other avenues of creativity. In 2024, Bright & Black released their debut album, featuring contributions from Tomas Haake and Dick Lövgren of Meshugga, Opeth guitarist Fredrik Åkesson, Watain frontman Erik Danielsson and ex-Entombed member Nico Elgstrand.

== Discography ==
=== Production and writing credits ===
Year	Artist	Album	Song(s)	Notes
1987	Surf MC's	Surf Or Die		Mixer
1987	The Cat Heads	Hubba		Producer, engineer
1987	Meghan	Meghan		Engineer
1989	Toms Tivoli	Fina Maskiner	"Fina Maskiner"	Mixer
1990	Svullo	Ride On...		Producer, recording engineer, mixer
1991	Just D	Svenska Ord		Producer, mixer
1991	Stonecake	Under The Biketree		Producer
1991	Hans Edström	Laddad		Producer, arrangements
1992	Stonecake	ABBA - The Tribute	"SOS"	Producer
1992	Just D	Rock N Roll		Producer
1993	Clawfinger	Deaf Dumb Blind		Producer
1993	Papa Dee	One Step Ahead		Writer, producer, mixer
1993	Fleshquartet	Flow		Producer
1993	Stonecake	Acoustic Toilets		Producer, recording engineer
1993	Just D	Tre Amigos		Mixer
1994	Peace, Love & Pitbulls	Red Sonic Underwear		Engineer
1994	Papa Dee	Original Master		Writer, producer
1995	Rammstein	Herzeleid		Producer
1995	Fistfunk	Totalmassconfusion		Producer, mixer
1995	Clawfinger	Use Your Brain		Producer, engineer
1995	Fistfunk	Bob Your Head		Producer
1996	Fleshquartet	Fire Fire		Producer, mixer
1996	Fleshquartet	Fire Fire	"Too Young To Die"	Composer, arrangements
1996	Papa Dee	The Journey	"Papa Do It Sweet"	Producer, mixer
1997	Rammstein	Sehnsucht		Producer
1997	Rammstein	–	"Das Modell"	Producer
1997	Monster	Rockers Delight		Producer, mixer
1998	Rammstein	For The Masses	"Stripped"	Producer
1999	Rammstein	Live aus Berlin		Producer
2000	Superia	–	"Permission"	Producer, mixer
2001	Rammstein	Mutter		Producer
2001	Clawfinger	A Whole Lot of Nothing		Producer
2002	Covenant	Northern Light		Producer
2003	Clawfinger	Zeros & Heroes	"Four Letter Word", "Money Power Glory", "Blame"	Producer
2003	Mustasch	Ratsafari		Producer, engineer
2004	Rammstein	Reise, Reise		Producer
2005	Rammstein	Rosenrot		Producer
2006	Enter The Hunt	Become The Prey EP		Producer
2006	Enter The Hunt	For Life. 'Til Death. To Hell. With Love.		Producer
2006	Rammstein	Völkerball		Producer
2007	Covenant	In Transit		Producer
2007	Emigrate	Emigrate		Co-producer
2007	Apocalyptica	Worlds Collide		Producer
2008	Backyard Babies	Backyard Babies		Producer
2009	Takida	The Darker Instinct		Producer
2009	Rammstein	Liebe ist für alle da		Producer
2010	Nicke Borg Homeland	Chapter 1		Recording engineer, mixer
2011	Nicke Borg Homeland	Chapter 2	"Leaving Home"	Producer
2011	Rammstein	Made in Germany 1995–2011	"Mein Land"	Producer
2011	Dead by April	Incomparable		Executive producer
2012	Delain	We Are the Others		Composer, producer, mixer
2013	Viktor & The Blood	Viktor & The Blood		Producer
2015	Lindemann	Skills in Pills		Producer (Post-production)
2015	Backyard Babies	Four by Four		Producer
2016	Entombed A.D.	Dead Dawn	"Down To Mars To Ride", "As The World Fell", "The Winner Has Lost"	Producer
2017	Rammstein	Paris		Producer, mixer
2019	Grand Magus	Wolf God		Mixer
2019	Jacob Hellner	Dirigenten / Moscow Noir (Original Television Soundtrack)		Composer, producer
2019	Entombed A.D.	Bowels of Earth		Producer
2024	Bright & Black	The Album		Composer, producer

=== Instrumental contributions ===
Year	Artist	Album	Song(s)	Instrument
1989	Toms Tivoli	Fina Maskiner	"Fina Maskiner"	Piano
1991	Hans Edström	Laddad		Guitar
1992	Just D	Rock N Roll		Performer
1995	Amen	Silver	"Electric", "Good Friends"	Drum programming
1998	Amen	Sunglow	"Good Friends"	Drum programming

== Awards and nominations ==
Echo Awards

Year	Category	Result
1999	Producer of the Year	Nominated

Grammis Awards

Year	Category	Result
1993	Producer of the Year	Nominated
1994	Producer of the Year	Won
