= Motor Music =

- Parent company: Universal Music Group (before 2005)
- Founded: 1994, 2005
- Founder: Tim Renner
- Genre: Rock
- Official website: motormusic.de

Motor Music is an independent record label based in Berlin, Germany providing a wide range of music services including music publication, artists management, producing music for films and business and music advertising. Motor Music was founded in 1994 by Tim Renner as a subsidiary of the music group PolyGram (later Universal Music). Within that period, Motor Music has discovered well-known European pioneering artists for instance Tocotronic, Rammstein, Sportfreunde Stiller, Farmer Boys, Element of Crime and Absolute Beginner.

== History ==
=== Refoundation ===
In 2005, 10 years after Motor Music was founded in 1994, the founder Tim Renner and Motor Music left Universal Music Group and re-founded Motor Entertainment. The Motor Music within the Motor Entertainment again operates as an independent label. After leaving Universal Music, Motor Entertainment continues in discovering new artists. The company also started to add other businesses into the music label including publication (e.g. Alice Phoebe Lou, L'aupaire, Sophia, Super700, PeterLicht), artists management (e.g. Max Raabe, Christoph Israel, Malakoff Kowalski, Fargo), and film and advertisement selection (e.g. 102 Boyz, BHZ, Jan Blomqvist, Teenage Mutants, Moonlight Breakfast).

=== Motor FM ===
In February 2005, after leaving Universal Music, Motor Music founded the radio station Motor FM, which began regular broadcasting. The radio emphasized advertising and news-free program mainly regarding German-language music. Besides the broadcast, the radio can also be heard live via the Internet. The radio station is regarded as the new forms of music marketing. In September 2006, Motor TV started to broadcast, a television program was available on IPTV and DVB-T which also focused on German-language music . In 2011, Motor FM changed its name to Flux FM transmitter and currently, both Motor FM and Motor TV have now stopped the business.

== Artists and recordings ==
Publication
Artist	Format	Title	Release date
Rammstein	Albums	Herzeleid	25 September 1995
		Sehnsucht	22 August 1997
		Live aus Berlin	31 August 1999
		Mutter	2 April 2001
		Lichtspielhaus	1 December 2003
	Singles	Du riechst so gut	24 August 1995
		Seemann	8 January 1996
		Engel	1 April 1997
		Engel (Fan-Edition)	23 May 1997
		Du hast	19 July 1997
		Das Modell	1997
		Stripped	28 July 1998
		Asche zu Asche	1995
		Sonne	12 February 2001
		Links 2–3–4	14 May 2001
		Ich will	10 September 2001
		Mutter	2 April 2001
		Feuer frei!	14 October 2002
Feeling B	Albums	Grün & Blau	9 November 2007
Emigrate	Albums	Emigrate	August 31, 2007

=== Artist management ===
- Max Raabe
- Christoph Israel
- Malakoff Kowalski
- Fargo

=== Film and advertisement music selection ===
- 102 Boyz
- BHZ
- Jan Blomqvist
- Teenage Mutants
- Moonlight Breakfast
- Lex Lugner
- Sparkling
- Pauls Jets
- Tara Nome Doyle

== Sub labels ==
The sub labels of Motor Music includes Motor, Motor Music Promo, Motor Publishing.

May also appear as Motor Song on some internet music platforms.

== Rammstein ==
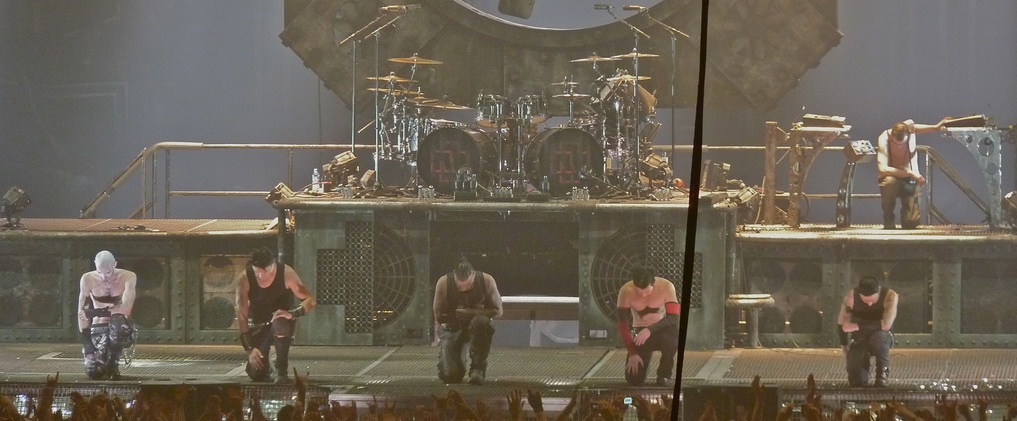
Rammstein concert at O2, London

In early 1994, Rammstein began working with manager Emanuel Fialik who later introduced the band to Motor Music recording company in the same year. Motor Music signed the band on January 4, 1995, and it becomes the first label of Rammstein.

Motor Music was responsible for the release of Rammstein's first three albums: Herzeleid, Sehnsucht and Mutter.

== Other artists recorded or published ==
=== Rock music ===
Artist	Title (format)	Year
Marilyn Manson	Holywood (CD, Album, Promo)	2000
	Disposable Teens (CD, Maxi, Promo)	2000
Farmer Boys	The World Is Ours (CD, Album, Promo)	2000
Thee Ultra Bimboos	No Return (CD, Single, Promo)	2003
Various	Motor Info CD 5/1-95 Popkomm Extra (CD, Comp, Promo)	1995
Element Of Crime	Die Schönen Rosen (CD, Album)	Unknown
	An Einem Sonntag Im April (Album)	1994
Faith No More	Album Of The Year (CD, Album)	1997
Various	18 Top Hits Aus Den Charts 2/97 (CD, Comp)	1997
	Giga Hits 95 (CD, Enh + CD + Comp)	1995
	Superploužáky 5 (CD, Comp)	1997
	#09 SPEX-CD (CD, Comp, Enh)	2001
A	Number One (CD, Single, Enh, CD2)	1998
Phillip Boa & The Voodooclub	Boa-85-01 (Singles Collection 1985 - 2001) (DVD-V, PAL)	2002
Muse	Hullabaloo Soundtrack Part I (Cass, Album, Promo)	2003
	Hullabaloo Soundtrack Part II (Cass, Album, Promo)	2003
Sparta	Wiretap Scars (LP, Album)	2002
	Austere (12", EP)	2002
Counting Crows	This Desert Life (CD, Album, Promo, Sho)	1999
Voodoocult	Jesus Killing Machine (CD, Album)	1994
	Voodoocult (CD, Album)	1995
Phillip Boa And The Voodooclub*	Boaphenia (CD, Album, RE)	1994
The Jeremy Days	Punk By Numbers (CD, Album)	1995
M. Walking On The Water	Pluto (CD, Album)	1995
Paisley	Paisley (LP + CD + Album)	2017
Die Versenker	Trebüt (CD-ROM, Album)	2017
William's Orbit	Once (LP, Album)	2016
Sophia	California (CDr, Single, Promo)	2016
William's Orbit	Once (CD, Album)	2016
Selig	Die Besten (1994–2014) (2xCD, Comp, Ltd + Box, Boo)	2014
Smile And Burn	Action Action (Album)	2014
The Secluded	The Secluded (CD, Album)	2013
Sun Of Moon	Sun Of Moon (2xCD, Album)	2013
Herrenmagazin	1000 Städte (CD, Single, Promo)	2008
Krieger	Heimat (Cass)	2007
Schrottgrenze	Schrottism (CD, Mixed, Promo, Car)	2007
	Am Gleichen Meer (CD, Single, Promo, Car)	2006

=== Electronic ===
Artist	Title (format)	Year
Pitchtuner	And No One Saw This Coming (File, MP3, Single)	2015
	Anniversary Song (File, AIFF, Single)	2014
	Ready To Go (CD, Album)	2014
Parasite Single	The Hunt (Remixed) (2xFile, AAC, 256)	2014
The Bianca Story	Dancing People Are Never Wrong (Jan Blomqvist Remix) (File, AAC, 256)	2012
PeterLicht	Neue Idee (CD, Single, Promo)	2011
Herrenmagazin	vs. Audiolith (4xFile, EP)	2010
Nana	Nana (CD, Album, RE)	2004
Armand Van Helden Featuring Duane Harden	You Don't Know Me (CD, Single)	1999
Lucid	Crazy (CD, Single, CD1)	1999
Incognito	Nights Over Egypt (CD, Maxi)	1999
Various	The Matrix - Music From And Inspired By The Motion Picture (Comp)	1999
Armand Van Helden	2Future4U (Album)	1999
	Flowerz (Single)	1999
Salt N Pepa	Push It [Again] (CD, Maxi)	1999
The All Seeing I Featuring Tony Christie	Walk Like A Panther (CD, Single, Ltd)	1999
Robert Miles	Dreamland (CD, Album)	1996

=== Hip Pop ===
Artist	Title (format)	Year
The Brand New Heavies	Sometimes (CD, Single, Ltd)	1997
Goldie Feat. KRS One	Digital (12", Single)	1997
Jeru The Damaja	Me Or The Papes (12")	1997
Salt 'n Pepa	R U Ready (CD, Single)	1997
	Brand New (CD, Album)	1997
	R U Ready (CD, Single)	1997
Various	Lords Of The Boards (2xCD, Comp)	1997
	We Love The Bee Gees (CD, Comp)	1997
All Saints	All Saints (Album)	1997
The Brand New Heavies	Shelter (CD, Album)	1997
Armand Van Helden	Sampleslaya - Enter The Meatmarket (CD, Album)	1997
R'n'G	Rhythm Of My Heart (Tik Tak) (Maxi)	1997
	Here Comes The Sun (CD, Maxi)	1997
Nana	Lonely (Maxi, Single)	1997
	He's Comin' (CD, Single)	1997
	Let It Rain (Maxi)	1997
Spax	Bianca Loves Cars & Spax (Fellatio Ist Mundpropaganda) (12", EP, Promo)	1996
Leila K.	Rude Boy (CD, Maxi)	1996
Antman	Spark It Up (CD, Maxi)	1996

=== Jazz ===
Artist	Title (format)	Year
Feline & Strange	Lies (CD, Album)	2015
Bugge Wesseltoft / Vinicius Cantuária	Verve Now (CD, Promo, Car)	1999
Volker Kriegel	Zoom (2xCD, Comp, RM)	1999
Clare Fischer	Latin Patterns (CD, Comp)	1999
Ernest Ranglin	Now Is The Time (CD, Comp)	1999
Till Brönner	Love (CD, Album, RP)	1999
Dieter Reith	Reith On! (CD, Comp)	1999
Various	Mojo Club Presents Dancefloor Jazz Volume Four (Light My Fire) (LP, Comp)	1995
Howard Johnson's Nubia	Arrival - A Pharoah Sanders Tribute (CD, Album)	1995
The Free Spirits (4) Featuring John McLaughlin	Tokyo Live (Cass, S/Sided, Promo, Smplr)	1994
Monty Alexander	Three Originals Love And Sunshine Estade Cobilimbo (2xCD, Comp)	1994
Oscar Peterson	Tracks (CD, Album, RE)	1994
Various	Barjazz (CD, Comp)	1994
United Future Organization	No Sound Is Too Taboo (2xLP, Album)	1994
The Kenny Clarke Francy Boland Big Band	Two Originals: All Blues/Sax No End (CD, Comp)	1994
George Shearing	Three Originals (2xCD, Comp + Box)	1994
The Singers Unlimited	Masterpieces (CD, Comp)	1994
The Hi-Lo's	Two Originals: Back Again. The Hi-Lo's Now (CD, Comp, RM)	1994
Oscar Peterson	Tracks (CD, Album, RE, RM)	1994

== See also ==
- List of record labels
