= List of awards and nominations received by Rammstein =

Rammstein (German pronunciation: [ˈʁamʃtaɪn]) is a German Neue Deutsche Härte band formed in Berlin in 1994. The band's lineup—consisting of lead vocalist Till Lindemann, lead guitarist Richard Kruspe, rhythm guitarist Paul Landers, bassist Oliver Riedel, drummer Christoph Schneider, and keyboardist Christian "Flake" Lorenz—has remained unchanged throughout their history. They were one of the first bands to emerge within the Neue Deutsche Härte genre, with their debut album leading the music press to coin the term, and their style of music has generally had a positive reception from music critics. Commercially, the band have been very successful, earning many No. 1 albums as well as gold and platinum certifications in countries around the world. Their grand live performances, which often feature pyrotechnics, have played a part in their popularity growth. Despite success, the band have been subject to some controversies, with their overall image and certain songs in specific having been subject to criticism. Rammstein have won several awards and honors and been nominated for two Grammy Awards.

== Grammy Awards ==
| Year | Nominee / work | Award | Result |
|---|---|---|---|
| 1999 | "Du hast" | Best Metal Performance | Nominated |
| 2006 | "Mein Teil" | Best Metal Performance | Nominated |

== Berlin Music Video Awards ==
| Year | Nominee / work | Award | Result |
|---|---|---|---|
| 2022 | Zeit | Best Concept | Nominated |

== Echo Awards ==
| Year | Nominee / work | Award | Result | Ref. |
|---|---|---|---|---|
| 1997 | Rammstein | Best National Newcomer | Nominated | |
| 1998 | Rammstein | Best National Group | Nominated | |
| 1998 | Motor Music | Best National Marketing | Won | |
| 1998 | "Engel" | National Song of the Year | Nominated | |
| 1998 | "Engel" | National Music Video | Won | |
| 1999 | Rammstein | Best National Act Abroad | Won | |
| 2002 | Rammstein | Best National Alternative | Won | |
| 2002 | "Sonne" | National Song of the Year | Nominated | |
| 2005 | Rammstein | Best National Alternative | Won | |
| 2005 | Rammstein | Best National Live Act | Won | |
| 2005 | "Ohne dich" | National Music Video | Nominated | |
| 2006 | Rammstein | Best National Alternative | Won | |
| 2006 | Rammstein | Best National Live Act | Nominated | |
| 2007 | Völkerball | Music DVD of the Year | Nominated | |
| 2010 | Rammstein | Best National Alternative | Won | |
| 2010 | Liebe ist für alle da | Album of the Year | Nominated | |
| 2011 | "Ich tu dir weh" | Best National Music Video | Won | |
| 2012 | "Mein Land" | Best National Music Video | Nominated | |
| 2012 | Rammstein | Best National Alternative | Won | |
| 2012 | Rammstein | Best National Act Abroad | Won | |
| 2013 | Videos 1995–2012 | Music DVD of the Year | Nominated | |
| 2016 | Rammstein in Amerika | Music DVD of the Year | Nominated | |

== European Festival Awards ==
| Year | Nominee / work | Award | Result | Ref. |
|---|---|---|---|---|
| 2011 | Rammstein | Best Headliner | Nominated | |

== Hungarian Music Awards ==
| Year | Nominee / work | Award | Result | Ref. |
|---|---|---|---|---|
| 2005 | Reise, Reise | Foreign Modern Rock Album | Nominated | |
| 2006 | Rosenrot | Foreign Rock Album | Nominated | |
| 2010 | Liebe ist für alle da | Foreign Hard Rock/Metal Album | Won | |
| 2020 | Rammstein | Foreign Hard Rock/Metal Album | Nominated | |
| 2023 | Zeit | Foreign Hard Rock/Metal Album | Nominated | |

== Kerrang! Awards ==
- Best live artist in 2002.
- Best inspiration in 2010.

== World Music Awards ==
- Best-selling German artist in the world in 2005.
- Best-selling German artist in the world in 2010.

== MTV Europe Music Awards ==
| Year | Nominee / work | Award | Result | Ref. |
|---|---|---|---|---|
| 1998 | Rammstein | Best Rock | Nominated | |
| 2001 | Rammstein | Best German Act | Nominated | |
| 2004 | Rammstein | Best German Act | Nominated | |

- Best German Artist in 2005.

== International Music Awards ==
- Best live band in 2019.

== Metal Hammer Awards ==
- Best album for "Liebe ist für alle da" in 2010.
- Best German group in 2012.
- God Of Riff for Richard Zven Kruspe in 2014.

== UK Music Video Awards ==
- Best live concert for "Rammstein: Paris" in 2017.

== Heavy Music Awards ==
- Best live band in 2020.

== PRG Live Entertainment Awards ==
- Best artist management in 2006.

== Emma Gaala Awards ==
- Best international artist in 2006.

== Edison Awards ==
- Best alternative artist in 2006.

== Swiss Music Awards ==
- Best international group in 2020.

== Champion DVD ==
- Best musical DVD for "Völkerball" in 2007.

== AntyRadio Rock Awards ==
- Best international rock album for "Rammstein" in 2020.
- Best rock hit for single "Ausländer" in 2020.
- Best rock group in 2020.

== Berlin Music Video Awards ==
- Best Concept for "Zeit" in 2022 (pending)

== Bravo Otto Awards ==
- Silver award for best rock group in 1997.
- Bronze award for best rock group in 2006.

== Viva Comet Awards ==
- Best live group in 1997.
- Best progressive artist in 1998.
- Best german video for "Keine Lust" in 2005.

== Metal Hammer Golden Gods Awards ==
- Best live group in 2012.

== Bandit Rock Awards ==
- Best artist in 2012.
- Best international live artist in 2014.
- Best international live group in 2020.
- Best international album for the album "Rammstein" in 2020.
- Best international song for single "Deutschland" in 2020.

== Hard Rock Awards ==
- Best rock group in 2001.

== 1Live Krone Awards ==
- Best live band/artist in 2005.

== Agendainfo Awards ==
- Best concert in the Netherlands in 2010.
- Best live show in 2010.

== Revolver Golden Gods Awards ==
- Best live artist in 2011.

== Loudwire Music Awards ==
- Best video for "Mein Land" music video in 2011.

== Prize Popculture ==
- Most impressive live show in 2017.
- Most impressive live show in 2022.

== German Music Authors' Prize ==
- Prize for the best Rock / Metal composition in 2018.

== Iberian Festival Awards ==
- Best international live performance in 2018.

== ZD Awards ==
- Best tour of the year for "Stadium Tour" in 2019.

== Berlin Monument Prize ==
- Ferdinand Von Quast medal in 2018.

== Moscow Ticketing Awards ==
- Best seller for the Luzhniki Stadium concert sold out the first week of sales for the Stadium Tour in 2019.

== Starcount Social Star Awards ==
- German musician award in 2013.

== Metal Storm Awards ==
- Best industrial metal/cyber/electronic album for "Rammstein" in 2020.
- Best Video for "Deutschland" in 2020.

== UK Festival Awards ==
| Year | Nominee / work | Award | Result | Ref. |
|---|---|---|---|---|
| 2010 | Sonisphere Festival | Best Headline Performance | Nominated | |

== Žebřík Music Awards ==
| Year | Nominee / work | Award | Result | Ref. |
|---|---|---|---|---|
| 1999 | Themselves | Best International Surprise | Nominated | |
| 2001 | Themselves | Best International Surprise | Nominated | |
| 2001 | Themselves | Best International Group | Nominated | |
| 2001 | Till Lindemann | Best International Male | Nominated | |
| 2001 | Mutter | Best International Album | Nominated | |
| 2001 | "Ich will" | Best International Song | Nominated | |
| 2001 | "Ich will" | Best International Video | Nominated | |
| 2001 | "Sonne" | Best International Song | Nominated | |
| 2001 | "Sonne" | Best International Video | Nominated | |
| 2001 | "Mutter" | Best International Song | Nominated | |
| 2002 | "Feuer frei!" | Best International Video | Nominated | |
| 2002 | Themselves | Best International Group | Nominated | |
| 2004 | Themselves | Best International Group | Nominated | |
| 2004 | Till Lindemann | Best International Male | Nominated | |
| 2004 | Reise, Reise | Best International Album | Won | |
| 2004 | "Amerika" | Best International Song | Won | |
| 2004 | "Amerika" | Best International Video | Won | |
| 2004 | "Mein Teil" | Best International Video | Nominated | |
| 2005 | Themselves | Best International Group | Nominated | |
| 2005 | Themselves | Best International Surprise | Nominated | |
| 2005 | Themselves | Best International Průser | Nominated | |
| 2005 | Till Lindemann | Best International Male | Nominated | |
| 2005 | Till Lindemann | Best International Personality | Nominated | |
| 2005 | Rosenrot | Best International Album | Nominated | |
| 2005 | "Benzin" | Best International Song | Nominated | |
| 2005 | "Benzin" | Best International Video | Won | |
| 2005 | "Keine Lust" | Best International Video | Nominated | |
| 2006 | Themselves | Best International Group | Nominated | |
| 2006 | Völkerball | Best International Music DVD | Nominated | |
| 2009 | Themselves | Best International Group | Nominated | |
| 2009 | Liebe ist für alle da | Best International Album | Nominated | |
| 2009 | "Pussy" | Best International Video | Nominated | |
| 2009 | "Roter Sand" | Best International Song | Nominated | |
| 2016 | Themselves | Best International Group | Nominated | |
