= Völkerball =

Live album by Rammstein
- Released: 17 November 2006
- Recorded: 28 November 2004 – 23 July 2005
- Venue: Sport Complex Olympiski (Moscow, Russia); Brixton Academy (London, England); Club Citta (Tokyo, Japan); Les Arènes de Nîmes (France)
- Genre: Neue Deutsche Härte, industrial metal
- Length: 104:59
- Label: Universal
- Producer: Jacob Hellner

Rammstein chronology
Rosenrot (2005)	Völkerball (2006)	Liebe ist für alle da (2009)

Professional ratings
Review scores
Source	Rating
AbsolutePunk.net	(72%)
AllMusic	3.5/5 stars

Völkerball (German pronunciation: [ˈfœlkɐˌbal]; German for "Dodgeball"; lit. "Peoples' ball") is the second live album and DVD by German rock band Rammstein. It was released on 17 November 2006 in Europe, 19 December 2006 in Canada and on 18 September 2007 in the US. The album was advertised within media by the "Ich will" live video featured on the DVD and "Mann gegen Mann" single.

The standard edition-packaging comes in both CD-sized and DVD-sized formats. The special edition features two DVDs and one CD. The extra DVD comes with the documentary Anakonda im Netz and the Making of Reise, Reise. The limited edition has two DVDs, two CDs and a photobook. The logo is derived from that of the 1980 Summer Olympics in Moscow.

== Versions ==
=== Standard edition: two-disc set ===
- DVD, 140-minute concert footage filmed in: Nîmes, Tokyo, London, and Moscow
- Audio CD, 75-minute live audio recorded in Nîmes
- Released in both CD-sized packaging and DVD-sized Packaging

=== Special edition: three-disc set ===
- DVD, 140-minute concert footage filmed in: Nîmes, Tokyo, London, and Moscow
- Audio CD, 75-minute live audio recorded in Nîmes
- DVD, 90-minute documentary: Anakonda im Netz and Making of Reise, Reise
- Released in both CD-sized packaging and DVD-sized Packaging

=== Limited 'tourbook' edition: four-disc set ===
- DVD, 140-minute concert footage filmed in: Nîmes, Tokyo, London, and Moscow
- Two Audio CDs, the entire live-audio-recording of the concert in Nîmes (105 minutes, dead airs were edited)
- DVD, 90-minute documentary: Anakonda im Netz and Making of Reise, Reise
- 190-page special edition, numbered tour 27 by 31 centimetres (11 in × 12 in) photobook
- Only 40,000 copies were produced, each one marked with a unique serial number.

== Track listing ==
Standard edition	Special edition	Limited edition
Live DVD
Les Arènes de Nîmes, France, 23 July 2005: 1. Reise, Reise; 2. Links 2-3-4; 3. Keine Lust; 4. Feuer frei!; 5. Asche zu Asche; 6. Morgenstern; 7. Mein Teil; 8. Stein um Stein; 9. Los; 10. Du riechst so gut 11. Benzin; 12. Du hast 13. Sehnsucht; 14. Amerika; 15. Rammstein; 16. Sonne; 17. Ich will 18. Ohne dich 19. Stripped; Brixton Academy, London, England, 2–4 February 2005: 1. Sonne; 2. Rein raus 3. Ohne dich 4. Feuer frei!; Club Citta, Tokyo, Japan, 3 June 2005: 1. Mein Teil; 2. Du hast 3. Los – Trailer; Sport Complex Olympiski, Moscow, Russia, 28 November 2004: 1. Moskau (Special)
Live in Nîmes		Entire Nîmes concert
1. Intro; 2. Reise, Reise; 3. Links 2-3-4; 4. Keine Lust; 5. Feuer frei!; 6. Asche zu Asche; 7. Morgenstern; 8. Mein Teil; 9. Los; 10. Du riechst so gut 11. Benzin; 12. Du hast 13. Sehnsucht; 14. Amerika; 15. Sonne; 16. Ich will		Disc one: 1. Intro; 2. Reise, Reise; 3. Links 2-3-4; 4. Keine Lust; 5. Feuer frei!; 6. Asche zu Asche; 7. Morgenstern; 8. Mein Teil; 9. Stein um Stein; 10. Los; Disc two: 1. Du riechst so gut 2. Benzin; 3. Du hast 4. Sehnsucht; 5. Amerika; 6. Rammstein; 7. Sonne; 8. Ich will 9. Ohne dich 10. Stripped; 11. Outro
Bonus DVD – documentaries & interviews
Not present	Anakonda im Netz: 60 min; Making of Reise, Reise: 25 min	

== Release history ==
Country	Date
Europe	17 November 2006
Canada	19 December 2006
United States	18 September 2007

== Charts ==
Chart (2006)	Peak position
German Albums Chart	1
Finnish Albums Chart	1
Mexican Albums Chart	1
Russian Albums Chart	1
Austrian Albums Chart	3
Hungarian Albums Chart	5
Dutch Albums Chart	7
Swiss Albums Chart	7
Japanese Albums Chart	11
Swedish Albums Chart	11
Danish Albums Chart	18
Czech Albums Chart	19
Norwegian Albums Chart	24
Polish Albums Chart	36
Belgium Albums Chart	48
Australian Albums Chart	49
French Albums Chart	54
Portuguese Albums Chart	58
Italian Albums Chart	61
Spanish Albums Chart	65
NZ Albums Chart	82
UK Albums Chart	99
Canadian Albums Chart	108
US Billboard 200	147
Irish Albums Chart	167

=== Year-end ===
End of year chart (2007)	Position
German Albums Chart	30

== Certifications ==
Certifications for "Völkerball" (album)
Region	Certification	Certified units/sales
Denmark (IFPI Danmark)	Gold	20,000^{^}
Germany (BVMI)	2× Platinum	400,000^{‡}
Poland (ZPAV)	Gold	10,000^{*}
Russia (NFPF)	Platinum	20,000^{*}
Switzerland (IFPI Switzerland)	Gold	15,000^{^}
^{*} Sales figures based on certification alone.^{^} Shipments figures based on certification alone.^{‡} Sales+streaming figures based on certification alone.

Certifications for "Völkerball" (video album)
Region	Certification	Certified units/sales
Germany (BVMI)	2× Platinum	100,000^{^}
United Kingdom (BPI)	Gold	25,000^{^}
^{^} Shipments figures based on certification alone.

== Reception ==
Völkerball was nominated for Echo Awards 2007 in the Best DVD category, which was won by Pink Floyd's Pulse.

== Personnel ==
- Till Lindemann – lead vocals, harmonica on "Los"
- Richard Kruspe – lead guitar, backing vocals, acoustic guitar on "Los"
- Paul Landers – rhythm guitar, backing vocals, acoustic guitar on "Los"
- Oliver Riedel – bass, backing vocals on "Stein um Stein" and "Sehnsucht"
- Christoph Schneider – drums
- Christian Lorenz – keyboards
