= Made in Germany 1995–2011 (tour) =

2011–13 concert tour by Rammstein

- Tour by Rammstein
- Location: Europe; North America
- Associated album: Made in Germany 1995–2011
- Start date: November 6, 2011
- End date: August 1, 2013
- Legs: 4
- No. of shows: 78 in Europe; 21 in North America; 99 in total

Rammstein concert chronology
- Liebe ist für alle da Tour (2009–2011); Made in Germany 1995–2011 (2011–2013); Rammstein Tour (2016)

Made in Germany 1995–2011 was a concert tour by German band Rammstein in support of the compilation album of the same name. The tour consisted of two European legs in late 2011 and early 2012, one North American leg in mid-2012, and a final European leg in mid-2013 which mostly consisted of festivals and other open air shows. This tour marked the first time the band played in Ireland, as well as the last time they performed in arenas, since all their further tours took place in stadiums.

== Set lists ==
2011 Rehearsal set list
- "Sonne"
- "Amerika"
- "Keine Lust"
- "Sehnsucht"
- "Asche zu Asche"
- "Feuer frei!"
- "Mutter"
- "Mein Teil"
- "Du riechst so gut"
- "Links 2-3-4"
- "Du hast"
- "Haifisch"
  B Stage
- "Bück dich"
- "Mann gegen Mann"
- "Pussy"
  Encore 1
- "Mein Herz brennt"
- "Wollt ihr das Bett in Flammen sehen?"
- "Ohne dich"
  Encore 2
- "Engel"
- "Ich will"
2011–2012 Europe and North America set list
- "Sonne"
- "Wollt ihr das Bett in Flammen sehen?"
- "Keine Lust"
- "Sehnsucht"
- "Asche zu Asche"
- "Feuer frei!"
- "Mutter"
- "Mein Teil"
- "Du riechst so gut"
- "Links 2-3-4"
- "Du hast"
- "Haifisch"
  B Stage
- "Bück dich"
- "Mann gegen Mann"
- "Ohne dich"
  Encore 1
- "Mein Herz brennt"
- "Amerika"
- "Ich will"
  Encore 2
- "Engel"
- "Pussy"
2013 Rehearsal set list
- "Ich tu dir weh"
- "Wollt ihr das Bett in Flammen sehen?"
- "Keine Lust"
- "Sehnsucht"
- "Asche zu Asche"
- "Feuer frei!"
- "Wiener Blut"
- "Mein Teil"
- "Mein Herz brennt (Piano Version)"
- "Benzin"
- "Du riechst so gut"
- "Links 2-3-4"
- "Du hast"
- "Rammstein (Intro)"
- "Bück dich"
- "Ohne dich"
  Encore
- "Sonne"
- "Ich will"
- "Pussy"
2013 Europe set list
- "Ich tu dir weh"
- "Wollt ihr das Bett in Flammen sehen?"
- "Keine Lust"
- "Sehnsucht"
- "Asche zu Asche"
- "Feuer frei!"
- "Mein Teil"
- "Ohne dich"
- "Wiener Blut"
- "Du riechst so gut"
- "Benzin"
- "Links 2-3-4"
- "Du hast"
- "Rammstein (Intro)"
- "Bück dich"
- "Ich will"
  Encore
- "Mein Herz brennt Piano Version"
- "Sonne"
- "Pussy"

Notes

- "Sehnsucht" was not performed in Zagreb, on November 8, 2011.
- For the first three shows of the tour in Bratislava, Zagreb, and Budapest, "Pussy" was played after "Mann gegen Mann". "Wollt ihr das Bett in Flammen sehen?" and "Amerika" were switched around. "Engel" was played right before "Ich will" which ended the show. "Ohne dich" was played right before "Engel".
- For the shows in Prague, and Gdańsk, "Engel" was played after "Pussy" which ended the show. "Wollt ihr das Bett in Flammen sehen?" and "Amerika" were switched around.
- In Munich they played "Bayern, des samma mia" after "Pussy".
- For the shows in Moscow, "Moskau" was played after "Pussy" which ended the show.
- In Helsinki, "Mein Herz brennt" featured Apocalyptica.
- The supporting band for the first and second leg of Europe was the band Deathstars.
- For the shows in Paris on March 6 and 7, "Frühling in Paris" was played after "Pussy" which ended the show. These shows were recorded for the film Rammstein: Paris.
- For the North American tour, Montreal, Quebec and Vancouver were the only dates that played "Bück dich" in its traditional way. Because of sensitivity reasons in the United States, an alternate performance was done where Christian Lorenz would break a fake light over Till Lindemann's back and then Till shoots water from his mask.
- The supporting act for the band during the North America leg of the tour was Joe Letz of Combichrist with a DJ set and large screen video.
- For the show at Denver, "Children Medieval Band" opened the show with "Ich will" and "Sonne".
- During the first few shows of the 2013 leg of the tour, the band played the rehearsal setlist in place of the regular one.
- This tour denotes the first time Rammstein played in Ireland.

== Tour dates ==
List of 2011 concerts
Date	City	Country	Venue
November 6, 2011	Bratislava	Slovakia	Zimný štadión Ondreja Nepelu
November 8, 2011	Zagreb	Croatia	Arena Zagreb
November 10, 2011	Budapest	Hungary	Papp László Sportaréna
November 12, 2011	Prague	Czech Republic	O_{2} Arena
November 14, 2011	Gdańsk	Poland	Ergo Arena
November 15, 2011	Gdańsk	Poland	Ergo Arena
November 17, 2011	Leipzig	Germany	Arena Leipzig
November 18, 2011	Leipzig	Germany	Arena Leipzig
November 21, 2011	Friedrichshafen	Germany	Rothaus Hall
November 22, 2011	Munich	Germany	Olympiahalle
November 23, 2011	Vienna	Austria	Wiener Stadthalle
November 25, 2011	Berlin	Germany	O_{2} World
November 26, 2011	Berlin	Germany	O_{2} World
November 28, 2011	Hamburg	Germany	O_{2} World
November 29, 2011	Bremen	Germany	Bremen-Arena
December 1, 2011	Strasbourg	France	Le Zénith
December 2, 2011	Esch-sur-Alzette	Luxembourg	Rockhal
December 4, 2011	Düsseldorf	Germany	ISS Dome
December 5, 2011	Düsseldorf	Germany	ISS Dome
December 6, 2011	Düsseldorf	Germany	ISS Dome
December 8, 2011	Frankfurt	Germany	Festhalle
December 9, 2011	Frankfurt	Germany	Festhalle
December 10, 2011	Stuttgart	Germany	Hanns-Martin-Schleyer-Halle
December 12, 2011	Zürich	Switzerland	Hallenstadion
December 14, 2011	Berlin	Germany	O_{2} World
December 15, 2011	Berlin	Germany	O_{2} World

List of 2012 concerts
Date	City	Country	Venue
February 3, 2012	Hanover	Germany	TUI Arena
February 6, 2012	Kaunas	Lithuania	Žalgirio Arena
February 7, 2012	Riga	Latvia	Arēna Rīga
February 10, 2012	Moscow	Russia	Olimpiyskiy
February 11, 2012	Moscow	Russia	Olimpiyskiy
February 13, 2012	Saint Petersburg	Russia	CKK Arena
February 15, 2012	Helsinki	Finland	Hartwall Areena
February 17, 2012	Stockholm	Sweden	Ericsson Globe
February 19, 2012	Oslo	Norway	Vallhall Arena
February 21, 2012	Copenhagen	Denmark	Forum
February 22, 2012	Herning	Denmark	Jyske Bank Boxen
February 24, 2012	London	England	The O_{2} Arena
February 25, 2012	Birmingham	England	LG Arena
February 27, 2012	Dublin	Ireland	The O_{2}
February 29, 2012	Newcastle	England	Metro Radio Arena
March 1, 2012	Manchester	England	Manchester Arena
March 2, 2012	Nottingham	England	Capital FM Arena
March 4, 2012	Rotterdam	Netherlands	Ahoy
March 6, 2012	Paris	France	Palais Omnisports Bercy
March 7, 2012	Paris	France	Palais Omnisports Bercy
March 8, 2012	Antwerp	Belgium	Sportpaleis
April 20, 2012	Sunrise	United States	BankAtlantic Center
April 21, 2012	Tampa	United States	Tampa Bay Times Forum
April 23, 2012	Atlanta	United States	Philips Arena
April 25, 2012	Baltimore	United States	1st Mariner Arena
April 26, 2012	Philadelphia	United States	Wells Fargo Center
April 28, 2012	Uniondale	United States	Nassau Coliseum
April 29, 2012	Worcester	United States	DCU Center
May 1, 2012	Montreal	Canada	Bell Centre
May 3, 2012	Cleveland	United States	Quicken Loans Arena
May 4, 2012	Rosemont	United States	Allstate Arena
May 6, 2012	Auburn Hills	United States	The Palace of Auburn Hills
May 8, 2012	Minneapolis	United States	Target Center
May 10, 2012	Winnipeg	Canada	MTS Centre
May 13, 2012	Vancouver	Canada	Rogers Arena
May 14, 2012	Tacoma	United States	Tacoma Dome
May 17, 2012	Anaheim	United States	Honda Center
May 18, 2012	Glendale	United States	Jobing.com Arena
May 20, 2012	Denver	United States	Denver Coliseum
May 22, 2012	Dallas	United States	American Airlines Center
May 24, 2012	San Antonio	United States	AT&T Center
May 25, 2012	Houston	United States	Toyota Center

List of 2013 concerts
Date	City	Country	Venue
April 14, 2013	Barcelona	Spain	Palau Sant Jordi
April 16, 2013	Lisbon	Portugal	Pavilhão Atlântico
April 19, 2013	Bilbao	Spain	Bizkaia Arena
April 21, 2013	Madrid	Spain	Palacio Deportes
April 23, 2013	Montpellier	France	Park&Suites Arena
April 24, 2013	Lyon	France	Halle Tony Garnier
April 26, 2013	Bologna	Italy	Unipol Arena
April 28, 2013	Belgrade	Serbia	Kombank Arena
April 30, 2013	Ljubljana	Slovenia	Arena Stožice
May 4, 2013	Wolfsburg	Germany	Kraftwerk (Movimentos-Festival)
May 5, 2013	Wolfsburg	Germany	Kraftwerk (Movimentos-Festival)
May 24, 2013	Berlin	Germany	Wuhlheide
May 25, 2013	Berlin	Germany	Wuhlheide
June 1, 2013	Nijmegen	Netherlands	FortaRock Festival
June 4, 2013	Warsaw	Poland	Impact Festival
June 8, 2013	Samara	Russia	Rock on Volga
June 13, 2013	Interlaken	Switzerland	Greenfield Festival
June 14, 2013	Nickelsdorf	Austria	Nova Rock Festival
June 16, 2013	Donington	England	Download Festival
June 21, 2013	Scheeßel	Germany	Hurricane Festival
June 23, 2013	Neuhausen ob Eck	Germany	Southside Festival
June 27, 2013	Norrköping	Sweden	Bråvalla Festival
June 29, 2013	Helsinki	Finland	Rock The Beach
July 6, 2013	Werchter	Belgium	Rock Werchter
July 7, 2013	Nancy	France	Zénith de Nancy
July 9, 2013	Rome	Italy	Rock in Rome Arena
July 11, 2013	Udine	Italy	Villa Manin
July 18, 2013	Carhaix-Plouguer	France	Festival des Vieilles Charrues
July 26, 2013	Sofia	Bulgaria	Sofia Rocks – Vasil Levski Stadium
July 28, 2013	Bucharest	Romania	Rock over Bucharest – Romexpo
August 1, 2013	Wacken	Germany	Wacken Open Air
