= Liebe ist für alle da Tour =

2009–11 concert tour by Rammstein

- Tour by Rammstein
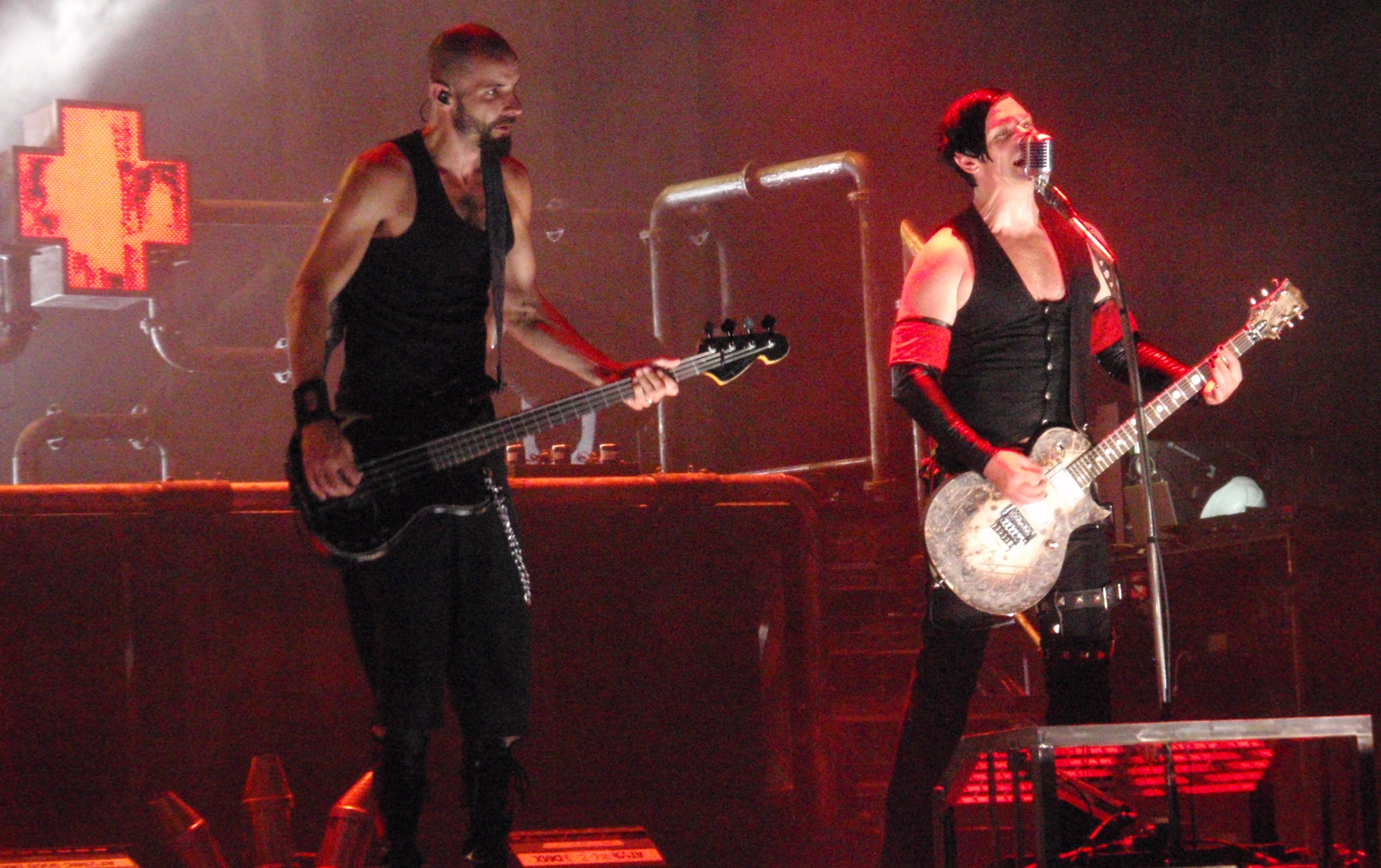
- Rammstein performing at BBK Live 2010 in Bilbao, Spain
- Associated album: Liebe ist für alle da
- Start date: November 8, 2009
- End date: May 31, 2011
- Legs: 10
- No. of shows: 79 in Europe; 18 in North America; 7 in Australasia; 5 in South America; 2 in Africa; 111 in total

Rammstein concert chronology
- Ahoi Tour (2004–2005); Liebe ist für alle da Tour (2009–2011); Made in Germany 1995–2011 (2011–2013)

The Liebe ist für alle da Tour was a concert tour by German band Rammstein that took place from 2009 through 2011, in support of their sixth studio album, Liebe ist für alle da. The tour consisted of six legs and took place in Europe, North America, South America, New Zealand, Australia and South Africa. During the tour, Rammstein would perform in the countries of Turkey and South Africa. The band would perform in the United States and Canada for the first time since their 2001 Mutter tour.

Rammstein headlined every performance throughout the tour, sometimes sharing headlining status at festival appearances. Their main support act was Combichrist, but also included Lacuna Coil, Skunk Anansie, Brand New Blood, and Kanatran. The tour consisted of six legs and 111 shows, beginning on November 8, 2009 and finishing on May 31, 2011.

== Set lists ==
2009 Rehearsal set list
- "Rammlied"
- "B*******"
- "Waidmanns Heil"
- "Keine Lust"
- "Feuer frei!"
- "Weisses Fleisch"
- "Wiener Blut"
- "Frühling in Paris"
- "Ich tu dir weh"
- "Liebe ist für alle da"
- "Links 2-3-4"
- "Haifisch"
- "Du hast"
- "Pussy"
- "Benzin"
- "Sonne"
- "Ich will"
  Encore
- "Seemann"
- "Rosenrot"
- "Engel"
Note: "Rosenrot" was played on the first rehearsal show out of the three and was after "Seemann".
2009 - 2011 Europe/North America set list
- "Rammlied"
- "B*******"
- "Waidmanns Heil"
- "Keine Lust"
- "Weisses Fleisch"
- "Feuer frei!"
- "Wiener Blut"
- "Frühling in Paris"
- "Ich tu dir weh" / "Asche zu Asche" / "Rein raus"
- "Liebe ist für alle da" / "Du riechst so gut"
- "Benzin"
- "Links 2-3-4"
- "Du hast"
- "Pussy"
  Encore 1
- "Sonne"
- "Haifisch"
- "Ich will"
  Encore 2
- "Engel"
- "Amerika" / "Te quiero puta!"

Notes

- "Du riechst so gut" replaced "Liebe ist für alle da" from the 2010-03-05 show in Vilnius, Lithuania onwards. "Pussy" was played with an extended outro since 2009-11-29 Cologne, Germany and "Engel" since 2010-02-06 Dortmund, Germany.
- "Te quiero puta!" was played after Engel for the last three shows of the tour in Mexico.
- "Asche zu Asche" and "Rein raus" were played instead of "Ich tu dir weh" during a few performances, due to the song being on the index of Federal Department for Media Harmful to Young Persons German federal agency.
- "Amerika" was also played once in 2009, in a performance in Switzerland, closing the show.
Summer 2010 festival set list
- "Rammlied"
- "B*******"
- "Waidmanns Heil"
- "Keine Lust"
- "Feuer frei!"
- "Wiener Blut"
- "Frühling in Paris"
- "Ich tu dir weh"
- "Du riechst so gut"
- "Benzin"
- "Links 2-3-4"
- "Du hast"
- "Pussy"
  Encore
- "Sonne"
- "Haifisch"
- "Ich will"
Note: "Ich will" was played with an extended outro during the Summer Festival leg of the tour.
Late 2010 South America / Early 2011 Africa set list
- "Rammlied"
- "B*******"
- "Waidmanns Heil"
- "Keine Lust"
- "Weisses Fleisch"
- "Feuer frei!"
- "Wiener Blut"
- "Frühling in Paris"
- "Mein Teil"
- "Du riechst so gut"
- "Benzin"
- "Links 2-3-4"
- "Du hast"
- "Pussy"
  Encore 1
- "Sonne"
- "Haifisch"
- "Ich will"
  Encore 2
- "Ich tu dir weh"
- "Te quiero puta!"

Notes

- "Ich tu dir weh" Was only played in its entirety on the 2010-11-25 Santiago, Chile show. Only the intro and pre-verse were played at later South America shows. That show also featured additional pyrotechnic effects on "Pussy" and members of the audience being chosen to join the stage for "Te quiero puta!".
- "Ich will" was played with an extended outro on the 2010-11-25 Santiago, Chile and 2010-11-27 Buenos Aires, Argentina shows.
2011 Oceania Big Day Out set list
- "Rammlied"
- "Waidmanns Heil"
- "Keine Lust"
- "Feuer frei!"
- "Wiener Blut"
- "Ich tu dir weh / Mein Teil"
- "Du riechst so gut"
- "Benzin"
- "Links 2-3-4"
- "Du hast"
- "Sonne"
- "Ich will"
- "Pussy"
Jimmy Kimmel Live! set list
- "Du hast"
- "Feuer frei!"
- "Sonne"
- "Keine Lust"
- "Ich will"

== Tour dates ==
List of 2009 concerts
Date	City	Country	Venue
November 8, 2009	Lisbon	Portugal	Pavilhão Atlântico
November 10, 2009	Madrid	Spain	Palacio de Deportes de la Comunidad de Madrid
November 12, 2009	Barcelona	Spain	Palau Municipal d'Esports de Badalona
November 14, 2009	Bilbao	Spain	Bizkaia Arena
November 16, 2009	Nantes	France	Le Zénith
November 18, 2009	Basel	Switzerland	St. Jakobshalle
November 19, 2009	Geneva	Switzerland	SEG Geneva Arena
November 21, 2009	Vienna	Austria	Wiener Stadthalle
November 23, 2009	Munich	Germany	Olympiahalle
November 24, 2009	Leipzig	Germany	Arena Leipzig
November 25, 2009	Prague	Czech Republic	O_{2} Arena
November 27, 2009	Katowice	Poland	Spodek
November 29, 2009	Cologne	Germany	Lanxess Arena
December 2, 2009	Lyon	France	Halle Tony Garnier
December 3, 2009	Strasbourg	France	Zénith de Strasbourg
December 6, 2009	Arnhem	Netherlands	GelreDome
December 8, 2009	Paris	France	Palais Omnisports de Paris-Bercy
December 10, 2009	Antwerp	Belgium	Sportpaleis
December 11, 2009	Frankfurt	Germany	Festhalle Frankfurt
December 12, 2009	Stuttgart	Germany	Hanns-Martin-Schleyer-Halle
December 14, 2009	Hamburg	Germany	Color Line Arena
December 15, 2009	Copenhagen	Denmark	Forum Copenhagen
December 17, 2009	Rostock	Germany	HanseMesse
December 18, 2009	Berlin	Germany	Velodrom
December 19, 2009	Berlin	Germany	Velodrom
December 20, 2009	Berlin	Germany	Velodrom
December 21, 2009	Berlin	Germany	Velodrom

List of 2010 concerts
Date	City	Country	Venue
February 2, 2010	Manchester	England	Manchester Evening News Arena
February 3, 2010	Birmingham	England	LG Arena
February 4, 2010	London	England	Wembley Arena
February 6, 2010	Dortmund	Germany	Westfalenhallen
February 7, 2010	Dortmund	Germany	Westfalenhallen
February 8, 2010	Mannheim	Germany	Maimarkthalle
February 10, 2010	Chemnitz	Germany	Chemnitz Arena
February 11, 2010	Dresden	Germany	Messehalle Dresden
February 12, 2010	Dresden	Germany	Messehalle Dresden
February 14, 2010	Erfurt	Germany	Messe Erfurt
February 15, 2010	Kiel	Germany	Sparkassen-Arena
February 16, 2010	Malmö	Sweden	Malmö Arena
February 18, 2010	Oslo	Norway	Vallhall Arena
February 20, 2010	Stockholm	Sweden	Ericsson Globe
February 22, 2010	Helsinki	Finland	Hartwall Areena
February 24, 2010	Tallinn	Estonia	Saku Suurhall Arena
February 26, 2010	Saint Petersburg	Russia	Petersburg Sports and Concert Complex
February 28, 2010	Moscow	Russia	Olympic Stadium
March 1, 2010	Moscow	Russia	Olympic Stadium
March 4, 2010	Riga	Latvia	Arena Riga
March 5, 2010	Vilnius	Lithuania	Siemens Arena
March 7, 2010	Minsk	Belarus	Minsk-Arena
March 9, 2010	Kyiv	Ukraine	International Exhibition Centre
March 12, 2010	Łódź	Poland	Arena Łódź
March 13, 2010	Ostrava	Czech Republic	ČEZ Aréna
March 16, 2010	Budapest	Hungary	Budapest Sports Arena
March 18, 2010	Zagreb	Croatia	Arena Zagreb
March 20, 2010	Belgrade	Serbia	Belgrade Arena
May 21, 2010	Berlin	Germany	Kindl-Bühne Wuhlheide
May 22, 2010	Berlin	Germany	Kindl-Bühne Wuhlheide
May 24, 2010	Berlin	Germany	Kindl-Bühne Wuhlheide
May 28, 2010	Landgraaf	Netherlands	Pinkpop Festival
May 30, 2010	Lisbon	Portugal	Rock in Rio
June 2, 2010	Copenhagen	Denmark	Copenhagen Live!Festival
June 3, 2010	Skive	Denmark	Skive Festival
June 4–6, 2010	Nürburg	Germany	Rock am Ring
June 4–6, 2010	Nuremberg	Germany	Rock im Park
June 11–13, 2010	Nickelsdorf	Austria	Nova Rock Festival
June 11–13, 2010	Interlaken	Switzerland	Greenfield Festival
June 15, 2010	Bergen	Norway	Koengen
June 18, 2010	Gothenburg	Sweden	Metaltown Festival
June 20, 2010	Seinäjoki	Finland	Provinssirock
June 23, 2010	Sofia	Bulgaria	Sonisphere Festival
June 25, 2010	Istanbul	Turkey	Sonisphere Festival
June 27, 2010	Bucharest	Romania	Sonisphere Festival
June 28, 2010	Athens	Greece	Terra Vibe Park
July 1, 2010	Verona	Italy	Castello di Villafranca
July 4, 2010	Arras	France	Main Square Festival
July 8, 2010	Bilbao	Spain	Kobeta Sonic Festival
July 10, 2010	Madrid	Spain	Sonisphere Festival
July 18, 2010	Quebec City	Canada	Quebec City Summer Festival
July 31, 2010	Knebworth	England	Sonisphere Festival
November 25, 2010	La Florida	Chile	Estadio Bicentenario
November 27, 2010	Avellaneda	Argentina	Estadio Presidente Perón
November 30, 2010	São Paulo	Brazil	Via Funchal
December 1, 2010	São Paulo	Brazil	Via Funchal
December 3, 2010	Sopó	Colombia	C.E.C.
December 6, 2010	Mexico City	Mexico	Palacio de los Deportes
December 7, 2010	Mexico City	Mexico	Palacio de los Deportes
December 9, 2010	Montreal	Canada	Centre Bell
December 11, 2010	New York City	United States	Madison Square Garden

List of 2011 concerts
Date	City	Country	Venue
January 21, 2011	Auckland	New Zealand	Big Day Out
January 23, 2011	Gold Coast	Australia	Big Day Out
January 26, 2011	Sydney	Australia	Big Day Out
January 27, 2011	Sydney	Australia	Big Day Out
January 30, 2011	Melbourne	Australia	Big Day Out
February 4, 2011	Adelaide	Australia	Big Day Out
February 6, 2011	Perth	Australia	Big Day Out
February 9, 2011	Cape Town	South Africa	Grand West Casino
February 11, 2011	Johannesburg	South Africa	Coca-Cola Dome
May 5, 2011	East Rutherford	United States	Izod Center
May 7, 2011	Montreal	Canada	Bell Centre
May 8, 2011	Toronto	Canada	Air Canada Centre
May 10, 2011	Rosemont	United States	Allstate Arena
May 13, 2011	Edmonton	Canada	Rexall Place
May 15, 2011	Tacoma	United States	Tacoma Dome
May 18, 2011	Oakland	United States	Oracle Arena
May 20, 2011	Inglewood	United States	The Forum
May 21, 2011	Paradise	United States	Thomas & Mack Center
May 26, 2011	Mexico City	Mexico	Palacio de los Deportes
May 27, 2011	Mexico City	Mexico	Palacio de los Deportes
May 29, 2011	Guadalajara	Mexico	Arena VFG
May 31, 2011	Monterrey	Mexico	Auditorio Banamex

Cancelled dates

December 4, 2009	Esch-sur-Alzette, Luxembourg	Rockhal	postponed to January 31, 2010.

== Additional notes ==
- Early in the tour the band played "Seemann" in between "Ich will" and "Engel" but dropped it shortly after the tour began.
- Due to the song "Ich tu dir weh" being banned by the Federal Government of Germany, the band played "Asche zu Asche" or "Rein raus" in its place at their German concerts until the ban was lifted. They also played a censored version of the song originally.
- They played the song "Amerika" once during this tour in Basel, Switzerland in November 2009.
- "Rosenrot" was performed in the first private rehearsal show for the Rammstein fan club in Berlin in October 2009, but it didn't make it to the tour set list.
- In Argentina the song "Waidmanns Heil" was interrupted and started again about 10 minutes later for security reasons.
- On the December 2009 dates in Hamburg, Copenhagen and Rostock, Alf Ator from the band Knorkator replaced Christian Lorenz on keyboards, because of illness.
