= Keine Lust =

Single by Rammstein

from the album Reise, Reise
- B-side: "Du hast" (Live); "Mein Teil"; remixes
- Released: 28 February 2005
- Recorded: 2003
- Studio: El Cortijo (Málaga, Spain)
- Genre: Neue Deutsche Härte; industrial metal; glam rock
- Length: 3:42
- Label: Universal
- Songwriters: Richard Kruspe; Paul Landers; Till Lindemann; Christian Lorenz; Oliver Riedel; Christoph Schneider
- Producers: Jacob Hellner; Rammstein

Rammstein singles chronology
"Ohne dich" (2004)	"Keine Lust" (2005)	"Benzin" (2005)

Music video
- "Keine Lust" on YouTube

"Keine Lust" (German for "no desire") is a song by German Neue Deutsche Härte band Rammstein. It was released as the fourth and final single from their fourth studio album, Reise, Reise (2004), on 28 February 2005 in Germany, Austria, and Switzerland as a maxi-single, a limited edition digipak single, a 7" vinyl single, a 12" vinyl single, and as a two-track.

== Music video ==
The "Keine Lust" music video was filmed in January 2005 and premiered a month later. It depicts a reunion between Rammstein, whose members are visibly aged and morbidly obese, and their instruments are old and dusty. They arrive at an underground parking garage in luxurious white cars (a 1970 Rolls-Royce Silver Shadow, 1970 Cadillac Calais, 1968 Mercedes-Benz 600, 1997 Mercedes-Benz S-Class limo and a 1957 Bentley S1) driven by beautiful women in white clothes, who help them set up the instruments, and the band's clothes and instruments are also white. Only keyboardist Flake appears not to have gained any weight. He arrives in a motorized wheelchair, just in time to play the keyboard part of the song. At the end of the video, the rest of the band leaves, abandoning Flake who has managed to stand during the song and now cannot sit back down (or walk).

Drummer Christoph Schneider came up with the idea for the video and originally wanted the song to be released as the lead single from Reise, Reise; he enjoyed the idea of Rammstein coming back from a long break in between albums with a morbidly obese appearance. Though the band did use his idea for the video, the song was released as the fourth and final single from the album instead. Despite the music playing over the band's performance in the video, some guitar feedback that was picked up from the microphones was included in the final cut of the video, something that director Jörn Heitmann wanted to include. In the video The Making of Keine Lust, guitarist Richard Kruspe discussed the meaning of the song and music video:

"You know, after all of these years we're full-up! Fame, success, money. We don't want to do anything anymore! Nothing! That's the idea in the song. We've returned to the starting point again. We just want to make music again. We don't want all the circus that goes with it anymore. So, we meet up again, one more time, for one more performance – just to make music together. The fact that we are fat is just symbolic for excess. It's really just about returning to the beginning."

The video was nominated for Best Video at the MTV Europe Music Awards in November 2005. The second version of the music video pays tribute to the music videos by featuring women shooting flames from masks ("Feuer frei!") and flamethrowers and one woman flaming jackets ("Rammstein").

== Live story ==
It was first played in three consecutive concerts for members of the fan club, in October 2004. In the formal tour, it was played in every concert. Large columns of CO_{2} were part of the stage show. The band played the song in the Echo Awards 2005, dressed in the costumes used in the video. They even arrived on stage in the cars seen in the video. At first, "Keine Lust" was the only song from Reise, Reise in the Liebe Ist Für Alle Da tour setlist, except for "Amerika" which was played at one show, and "Mein Teil", which was reintroduced into the setlist later in the tour.

== Track listing ==
German CD maxi single

No.	Title	Remixed by	Length
1.	"Keine Lust"		3:44
2.	"Keine Lust (Remix No. 1)"	Clawfinger	4:37
3.	"Keine Lust (The Psychosonic Remix)"	DJ Drug	5:02
4.	"Keine Lust (Bozz Remix)"	Azad	3:52
5.	"Keine Lust (Jazz Remix)"	Clawfinger	4:11
6.	"Keine Lust (Black Strobe Remix)"	Black Strobe	7:08
7.	"Keine Lust (Curve Remix)"	Front 242	3:40
8.	"Keine Lust (Ich zähl die Fliegen Remix)"	Krieger	3:30

Also released as a 2-track CD and Mini CD featuring "Keine Lust" and "Keine Lust (Remix No. 1)"

UK CD single

No.	Title	Remixed by	Length
1.	"Keine Lust"		3:44
2.	"Ohne dich (Mina Harker's Version)"	Laibach	4:09
3.	"Mutter (Orchestra Version)"

UK 7" vinyl single

No.	Title	Length
1.	"Keine Lust"	3:44
2.	"Du hast (Live)" (Live audio from Parkbühne Wuhlheide, Berlin, August 1998)	4:27

12" vinyl single

No.	Title	Length
1.	"Keine Lust (Black Strobe Remix)"
2.	"Keine Lust (Black Strobe Remix Instrumental)"
3.	"Keine Lust (Curve Remix)"
4.	"Keine Lust (Curve Remix Instrumental)"

UK DVD single

No.	Title	Length
1.	"Keine Lust" (audio)	3:44
2.	"Mein Teil (Single Version)" (audio)	4:26
3.	"Mein Teil (Full Version)" (video)	4:25
4.	"The Making of Mein Teil" (video)	11:38

== Charts ==
Chart (2005)	Peak position
Austria (Ö3 Austria Top 40)	25
Belgium (Ultratip Bubbling Under Flanders)	7
Belgium (Ultratip Bubbling Under Wallonia)	13
Denmark (Tracklisten)	4
Finland (Suomen virallinen lista)	14
Germany (GfK)	16
Netherlands (Single Top 100)	19
Scottish Singles Sales (Official Charts)	36
Spain (Promusicae)	5
Sweden (Sverigetopplistan)	57
Switzerland (Schweizer Hitparade)	30
UK Singles (Official Charts)	35
UK Rock & Metal (Official Charts)	1
