= Bück dich =

Controversial Rammstein song

Song by Rammstein

from the album Sehnsucht
- Released: 19 July 1997
- Recorded: 1997
- Studio: Temple, Malta
- Genre: Neue Deutsche Härte; industrial metal
- Length: 3:22
- Label: Motor; Slash
- Songwriter(s): Richard Kruspe; Paul Landers; Till Lindemann; Christian Lorenz; Oliver Riedel; Christoph Schneider
- Producer(s): Jacob Hellner; Rammstein

"Bück dich" (German: [ˈbʏk ˌdɪç], lit. 'Bend Down' or 'Bend Over') is a song by the Neue Deutsche Härte band Rammstein that first appeared on their second studio album, Sehnsucht, and as one of the B-sides to the CD version of "Du hast".

== Live performance and controversy ==
When performing it live, vocalist Till Lindemann has simulated anal sex with keyboardist Christian Lorenz using a water-squirting dildo.

Due to the controversial nature of the act, Lindemann and Lorenz were both arrested after a concert held on June 5, 1999 in Worcester, Massachusetts. They were each fined $200 and spent the night in jail. Consequently, three versions of Rammstein's Live aus Berlin were released - one VHS including "Bück dich", another VHS and DVD without it and the uncensored DVD including the song.

== Comeback ==
The song made a comeback in the Made in Germany 1995–2011 tour. It was also performed in Worcester again, without any incidents. Footage of the original concert was also rereleased in the 2024 edition of concert DVD Live aus Berlin after previously being censored.
