= Velodrom (Berlin) =

Sports arena and velodrome in Berlin, Germany

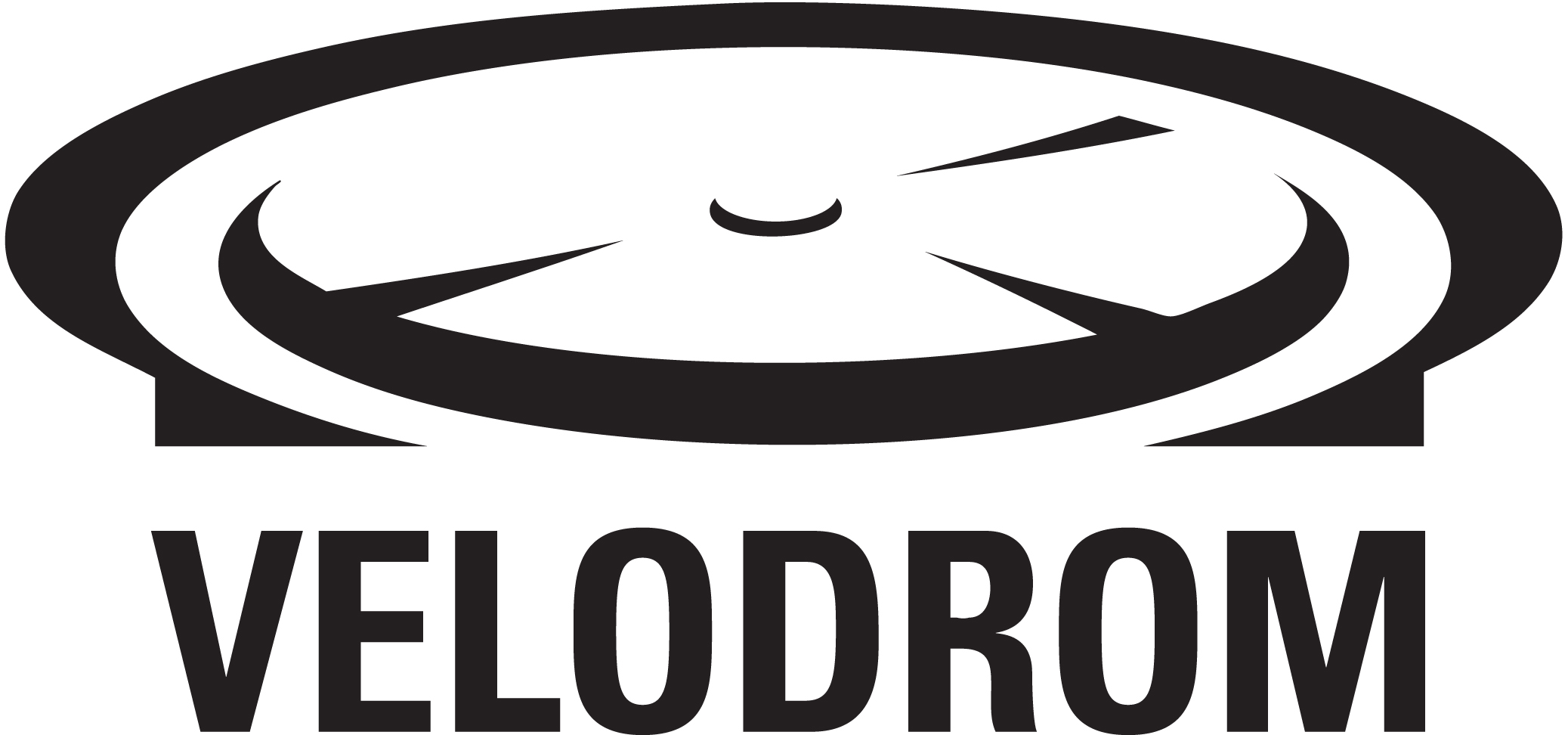

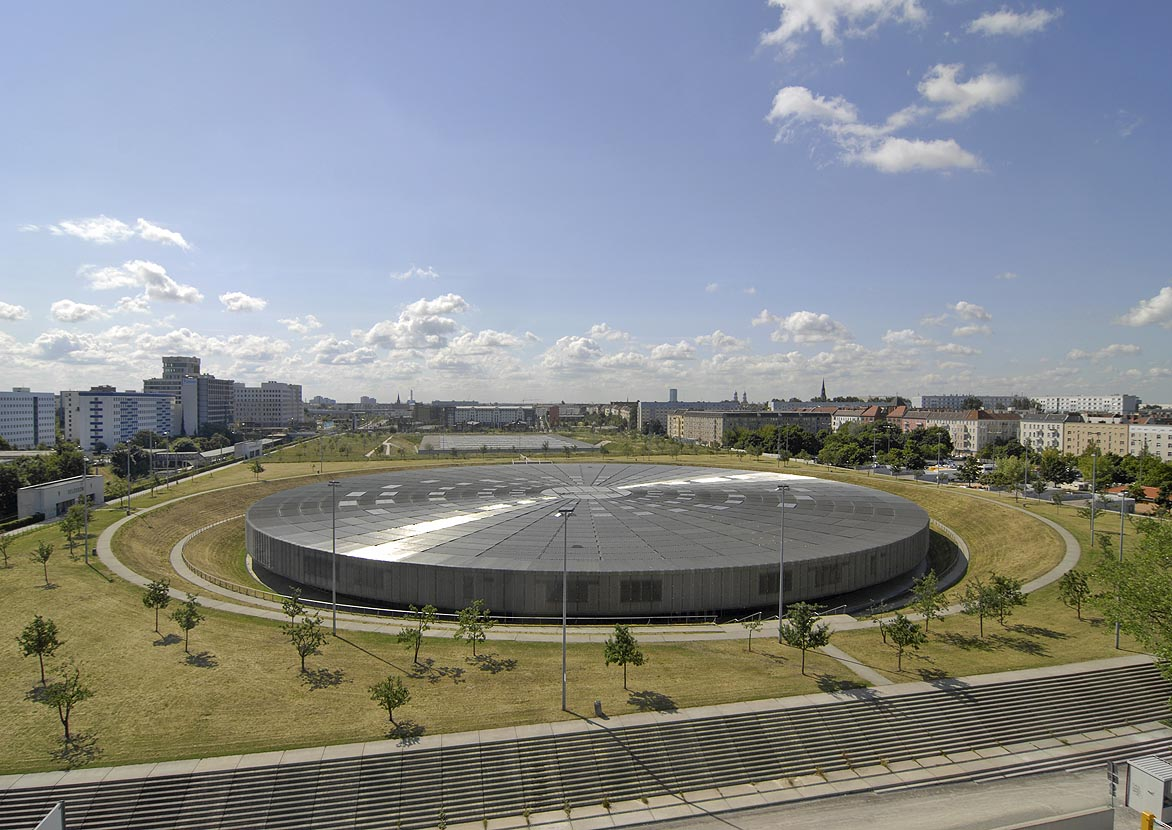
- Interactive map of Velodrom
- Location: Berlin, Germany
- Coordinates: 52°31′51″N 13°27′03″E
- Owner: Unternehmensgruppe Gegenbauer
- Operator: Velomax
- Capacity: 12,000 (concerts); 6,887 (tennis); 4,911 (press conference)

Construction
- Built: 1992–1997
- Opened: 1997
- Cost: €138 million
- Architect: Dominique Perrault
- Structural engineer: Ove Arup & Partners

Tenants
- Six Days of Berlin (1999-present); UCI Track Cycling World Championships (1999, 2020); 2017 UEC European Track Championships; 2014 European Aquatics Championships

The Velodrom (velodrome) is an indoor track cycling arena, in the Prenzlauer Berg locality of Berlin, Germany. Holding up to 12,000 people, it was also Berlin's largest concert venue, until the opening of Uber Arena in 2008.

It is part of a larger complex, which includes a swimming pool as well, built in the course of the unsuccessful Berlin application for the 2000 Summer Olympics. This project is related to the German reunification and the wish of a city, Berlin, about to become the capital, to be nominated for the Olympic Games.

It replaced the former Werner-Seelenbinder-Halle, which was demolished in 1993. It mainly hosts indoor sporting events, trade shows and concerts.

== Architecture ==
The building was designed by French architect Dominique Perrault who won an international design competition in 1992 and was awarded the German Award of Architecture, second prize for the velodrome and the Olympic swimming pool. The site chosen is at the intersection of urban elements and of different networks. In order to resolve the conjunction of these two systems, the buildings which house the velodrome and the Olympic swimming pool vanish from sight. The idea was to create an orchard of apple trees with two buildings set into the ground, one round and the other rectangular, covered with a wire gauze, which shimmer in the sunlight and appear to be stretches of water more than buildings.

The project includes

- A multi-use velodrome: cycling, athletics, tennis, equestrianism, sports education, and concerts;
- A swimming pool: two Olympic pools, Olympic diving platform, pools for diving training, handicapped, children;
- A multi-sport hall.

The arena is famous for its steel roof construction – with a diameter of 142 meters, it has Europe's largest steel roof.

== Notable events ==
In 1998, Janet Jackson performed there during her The Velvet Rope Tour.

In 1999 and 2020, it hosted the UCI Track Cycling World Championships and has been the site of the annual Six Days of Berlin since then.

In 2001, 2004 and 2009, Rammstein performed a total of nine shows part of their Mutter Tour, Reise, Reise Tour and the Liebe ist für alle da Tour

In 2002, Destiny's Child performed for the first time in Berlin at this venue as part of their Destiny's Child World Tour.

In 2002 and 2008, Kylie Minogue performed her Fever Tour and KylieX2008 tours.

In 2004, Britney Spears performed a sold-out show of The Onyx Hotel Tour.

In 2007, Daft Punk performed Alive 2006/2007.

In 2014, the Velodrom has been the site of 32nd European Aquatics Championships.

In 2017, cycling European Track Championship took place.

On June 12, 2022, My Chemical Romance performed at the arena as part of their Reunion Tour.

On December 4, 2022, Rosalía performed a show from her Motomami World Tour.

ESL hosted the Berlin Major for DOTA 2 here on May 5-7, 2023.

On September 25, 2024, Aurora performed a sold-out show from her What Happened to the Earth? tour.

== See also ==
- List of cycling tracks and velodromes
- Max-Schmeling-Halle

Preceded by Vélodrome de Bordeaux; Bordeaux	UCI Track Cycling World Championships; Venue; 1999	Succeeded by Manchester Velodrome; Manchester
Preceded by BGŻ Arena; Pruszków	UCI Track Cycling World Championships; Venue; 2020	Succeeded by Ashgabat Velodrome; Ashgabat
