= Feuer frei! =

2002 single by Rammstein

Single by Rammstein

from the album Mutter
- B-side: "Mutter"; "Kokain"; remixes
- Released: 14 October 2002
- Recorded: May and June 2000
- Studio: Miraval (Correns, France)
- Genre: Neue Deutsche Härte; industrial metal
- Length: 3:08
- Label: Motor • Universal
- Songwriters: Richard Kruspe; Paul Landers; Till Lindemann; Christian Lorenz; Oliver Riedel; Christoph Schneider
- Producers: Jacob Hellner; Rammstein

Rammstein singles chronology
"Mutter" (2002)	"Feuer frei!" (2002)	"Mein Teil" (2004)

Music video
- "Feuer frei!" on YouTube

Audio sample
- file; help

"Feuer frei!" (German pronunciation: [ˈfɔʏɐ ˈfʁaɪ]) is a song by German industrial metal band Rammstein. The song was released as the fifth single from their third album Mutter. The title is from the command to start shooting in German military language (literally "fire freely!") and can be compared to "fire at will" or "open fire".

"Feuer frei!" is one of the band's most well known songs. Despite this, it does not feature on the band's greatest hits collection Made in Germany 1995–2011, for reasons that have not been explained. The song is featured in the film xXx and during the CSI: Crime Scene Investigation episode "Slaves of Las Vegas". The UK "Feuer frei!" single was released in three parts (2 CDs, 1 DVD), in three different colors (Yellow-Green-Orange), each with different track listings.

== Live performances ==
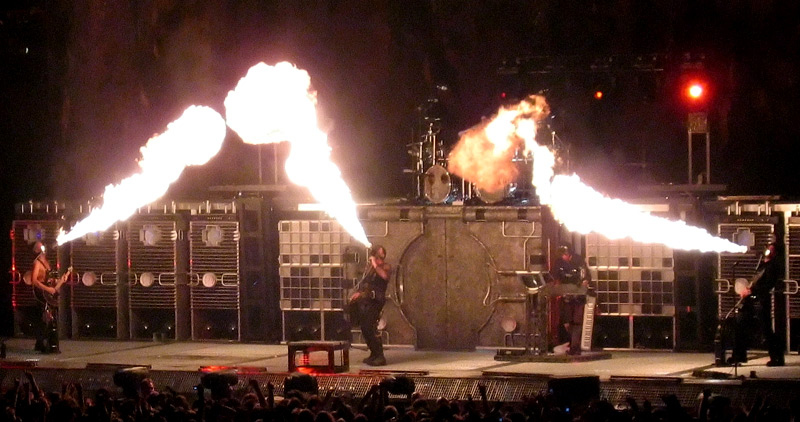
A live performance of "Feuer frei!"

"Feuer frei!" debuted live in a concert exclusively for members of the fan area in April 2000, when it was called "Punk". Its next performance was not until May 2001 (this being the album version), and it has been played in almost every Rammstein concert since then. During live performances of this song, Richard Kruspe, Paul Landers, Till Lindemann and sometimes Oliver Riedel will wear masks with flamethrowers attached that shoot flames several metres into the air.

== Music video ==
The video was directed by Rob Cohen who also directed the film xXx. The video for "Feuer frei!" was released in America on MTV, to promote the film. The music video consists of the band playing on a fiery stage, with several clips from the film. In addition, Rammstein is featured playing the song in a club in Prague in the film's opening.

== Track listing ==
German version

1. "Feuer frei!" – 3:13
2. "Feuer frei! (Rammstein vs. Junkie XL Remix)" – 4:10
3. "Feuer frei! (Rammstein Remix 130)" – 3:44
4. "Feuer frei! (Rammstein Remix 95)" – 3:34
5. "Du hast" ("A Tribute to Rammstein", cover version by Battery) – 4:42
6. "Bück dich" ("A Tribute to Rammstein", cover version by Battery) – 3:39

UK version, part 1 (yellow cover)

1. "Feuer frei!" – 3:11
2. "Mutter (Radio Edit)" – 3:40
3. "Kokain" – 3:08
4. "Feuer frei!" (video)
5. Interview ("On the Set of Sonne")

UK version, part 2 (green cover)

1. "Feuer frei! (Rammstein vs. Junkie XL Remix)" – 4:10
2. "Mutter" – 4:33
3. "Feuer frei! (Rammstein Remix 95)"
4. Interview ("On the Set of Ich will")
5. Photo gallery

UK CDS Part 3 (DVD) (orange cover)

1. "Feuer frei!" (video) – 3:11
2. Interview ("The Early Years Discussed")
3. "Du hast" ("A Tribute to Rammstein", cover version by Battery) – 4:42
4. "Bück dich" ("A Tribute to Rammstein", cover version by Battery) – 3:39
5. Photo gallery
- Although the liner notes list both cover versions as performed by Battery, this is an error. "Du hast" was performed by Josef Melen (keyboard, drum programming), Christian Meyer (vocals), Peter Durst (vocals) and Doj Moon (guitars), and the band Colp performed "Bück dich".

== Charts ==
Chart performance for "Feuer frei!"
Chart (2002)	Peak position
Austria (Ö3 Austria Top 40)	28
Germany (GfK)	33
Netherlands (Single Top 100)	70
Scottish Singles Sales (Official Charts)	25
UK Singles (Official Charts)	35
UK Rock & Metal (Official Charts)	2

== Certifications ==
Certifications for "Feuer frei!"
Region	Certification	Certified units/sales
Denmark (IFPI Danmark)	Gold	45,000^{‡}
Germany (BVMI)	Gold	300,000^{‡}
New Zealand (RMNZ)	Gold	15,000^{‡}
United Kingdom (BPI)	Silver	200,000^{‡}
^{‡} Sales+streaming figures based on certification alone.
