= Rosenrot =

Studio album by Rammstein
- Released: October 28, 2005
- Studios: Teldex Studio (Berlin); El Cortijo Studio (Málaga)
- Genres: Neue Deutsche Härte; industrial metal
- Length: 48:00
- Languages: German; English; Spanish
- Label: Universal
- Producers: Jacob Hellner; Rammstein

Rammstein chronology
Reise, Reise (2004)	Rosenrot (2005)	Völkerball (2006)

Singles from Rosenrot
- 1. "Benzin" Released: 7 October 2005; 2. "Rosenrot" Released: 16 December 2005; 3. "Mann gegen Mann" Released: 3 March 2006

Professional ratings
Review scores
Source	Rating
AllMusic	3/5 stars
Blabbermouth.net	8/10
Entertainment Weekly	C
IGN	5.2/10
Kerrang!	3/5 stars
Now	3/5 stars
PopMatters	8/10
Release Magazine	6/10
Sputnikmusic	4.5/5

Rosenrot (German pronunciation: [ˈʁoːzn̩ˌʁoːt], "Rose-Red") is the fifth studio album by German Neue Deutsche Härte band Rammstein, released in 2005. The album includes six songs written for but omitted from their previous album Reise, Reise. The album's first title was Reise, Reise Volume Two, but on 18 August 2005 the album was announced as Rosenrot. The image is a slightly altered photograph of the icebreaker USS Atka, taken on 13 March 1960 at McMurdo Station, Ross Ice Shelf, Antarctica.

While Rammstein did not actively promote the album, the band built anticipation through a variety of means. The first single from the album, "Benzin", premiered at the Berliner Wuhlheide and was subsequently released on disc. Rammstein's official website featured one-minute samples from six of the tracks, and had a prominent release-date countdown. A brief section of the chorus from "Rosenrot" plays in the background of an e-card containing photographs of the band and basic album information. As of February 2006, the album had shipped 1 million copies globally.

== Track listing ==
All tracks are written by Rammstein.

No.	Title	Length
1.	"Benzin" ("Gasoline")	3:46
2.	"Mann gegen Mann" ("Man Against Man")	3:50
3.	"Rosenrot" ("Rose-red")	3:54
4.	"Spring" ("Jump")	5:24
5.	"Wo bist du" ("Where Are You")	3:55
6.	"Stirb nicht vor mir (Don't Die Before I Do)" (featuring Sharleen Spiteri and Bobo)	4:05
7.	"Zerstören" ("Destroy")	5:28
8.	"Hilf mir" ("Help Me")	4:43
9.	"Te quiero puta!" (featuring Carmen Zapata; Sp.: "I love you, bitch!")	3:55
10.	"Feuer und Wasser" ("Fire and Water")	5:17
11.	"Ein Lied" ("A Song")	3:43
Total length:		48:00

- There is a compact cassette available (side A = 1–6; B = 7–11)
- The US version features a parental advisory label that is printed on the cover.

== Limited edition bonus DVD ==
The limited edition includes the normal CD plus a DVD with three live performances:

1. Reise, Reise (Arena of Nîmes, Nîmes / France July 2005)
2. Mein Teil (Club Citta, Kanagawa / Japan June 2005)
3. Sonne (Brixton Academy, London / UK February 2005)

All bonus performances were later featured on the DVD Völkerball.

- The Limited Edition featured slightly altered artwork, namely "Limited Edition" printed in white on the top left corner, and the band and album name is reflective.
- The US version is the Special Edition, with that printed on the top left corner and the parental advisory logo below, alongside the reflective band and album name.
- The Japanese version, released in 2009, has a SHMCD and the DVD.

== Personnel ==
Rammstein

- Till Lindemann – vocals
- Christoph Schneider – drums
- Christian Lorenz – keyboards
- Oliver Riedel – bass guitar
- Richard Kruspe – lead guitar, backing vocals
- Paul Landers – rhythm guitar, backing vocals

Additional musicians

- Sharleen Spiteri – vocals (track 6)
- Bobo – backing vocals (track 6)
- Christo Hermanndos – trumpet (track 9)
- Carmen Zapata – vocals (track 9)
- Olsen Involtini – string arrangement (track 8)
- Sven Helbig – trumpet arrangement (track 9)
- Matthias Wilke – choir conductor (tracks 1, 2 & 4)

Production

- Produced by Jacob Hellner

== Release history ==
Country	Date
Europe	28 October 2005
Canada	6 December 2005
United States	28 March 2006

== Charts ==
=== Weekly charts ===
Chart (2005–2006)	Peak position
Australian Albums (ARIA)	44
Austrian Albums (Ö3 Austria)	1
Belgian Albums (Ultratop Flanders)	3
Belgian Albums (Ultratop Wallonia)	8
Canadian Albums (Billboard)	49
Czech Albums (ČNS IFPI)	8
Danish Albums (Hitlisten)	2
Dutch Albums (Album Top 100)	4
Finnish Albums (Suomen virallinen lista)	1
French Albums (SNEP)	5
German Albums (Offizielle Top 100)	1
Hungarian Albums (MAHASZ)	18
Irish Albums (IRMA)	40
Italian Albums (FIMI)	20
New Zealand Albums (RMNZ)	38
Norwegian Albums (VG-lista)	4
Polish Albums (OLiS)	7
Portuguese Albums (AFP)	7
Scottish Albums (Official Charts)	26
Spanish Albums (Promusicae)	9
Swedish Albums (Sverigetopplistan)	2
Swiss Albums (Schweizer Hitparade)	2
UK Albums (Official Charts)	29
US Billboard 200	47
US Top Rock Albums (Billboard)	13

=== Year-end charts ===
Chart (2005)	Position
Austrian Albums (Ö3 Austria)	22
Belgian Albums (Ultratop Flanders)	33
Belgian Albums (Ultratop Wallonia)	84
Dutch Albums (Album Top 100)	61
Finnish Albums (Suomen virallinen lista)	12
French Albums (SNEP)	110
German Albums (Offizielle Top 100)	23
Swedish Albums (Sverigetopplistan)	55
Swiss Albums (Schweizer Hitparade)	26

Chart (2006)	Position
German Albums (Offizielle Top 100)	50
Swiss Albums (Schweizer Hitparade)	81

== Certifications and sales ==
Region	Certification	Certified units/sales
Denmark (IFPI Danmark)	Gold	20,000^{^}
Finland (Musiikkituottajat)	Gold	20,892
Germany (BVMI)	3× Platinum	600,000^{‡}
Poland (ZPAV)	Gold	19,000
Russia (NFPF)	2× Platinum	40,000^{*}
Switzerland (IFPI Switzerland)	Platinum	40,000^{^}
United Kingdom (BPI)	Silver	60,000^{^}
^{*} Sales figures based on certification alone.^{^} Shipments figures based on certification alone.^{‡} Sales+streaming figures based on certification alone.
