= Ohne dich =

2004 song by Rammstein

Single by Rammstein

from the album Reise, Reise
- B-side: "Remixes"
- Released: 22 November 2004
- Recorded: 2003
- Studio: El Cortijo (Málaga, Spain)
- Genre: Symphonic rock
- Length: 4:32
- Label: Universal
- Songwriters: Richard Kruspe; Paul Landers; Till Lindemann; Christian Lorenz; Oliver Riedel; Christoph Schneider
- Producers: Jacob Hellner, Rammstein

Rammstein singles chronology
"Amerika" (2004)	"Ohne dich" (2004)	"Keine Lust" (2005)

Music video
- "Ohne dich" on YouTube

"Ohne dich" (German pronunciation: [ˈoːnə ˌdɪç] "Without You") is a song by German Neue Deutsche Härte band Rammstein. It was released on 22 November 2004 as the third single from their fourth studio album, Reise, Reise (2004).

== Composition ==
"Ohne dich" can be seen as expressing mourning over the loss of a loved person. It follows a slow, even romantic ballad style. The central motif is "Without you, I cannot be..., With you, I am alone also...". This song also features how death is not just mourning but a bond between the people that are there at the funeral. It's not all about death, it's about the remembrance of this person and how they brought everyone closer.

The visuals play off what are called Heimatfilms and the reference to the birds no longer singing ("Und die Vögel singen nicht mehr") could refer also to the Wandervogel with a nostalgic feeling of loss of the freedom they embodied, which was manifested with ballads and nature wandering.

This song was parodied by the group Laibach and sang by Milan Fras and Mina Spiler. It also Inspired the song of Francky Vincent "Matthis mon Fils" (Very similar intro).

== Live performances ==
The song debuted live in its beta version in 2000, in a concert just for members of the fan club. After that, it was dropped during the 2001–02 Mutter tour. It returned to the setlists for the 2004–05 Reise, Reise tour, in which it was played in almost every concert, exceptions being festivals. Usually, sparks would rain over Till Lindemann during the final chorus. In those of the live shows that Apocalyptica was the support act, they played the cellos in the song. The song was not played in the Liebe ist für alle da tour, but reappeared for the Made in Germany 1995–2011 tour, Download Festival 2013 and the European Stadium Tour 2019.

== Video ==
The video was filmed in the Kaun Valley and on the Großglockner in Austria. It shows the band climbing in the mountains when lead vocalist Till Lindemann falls and gets badly hurt. In the night, while the band sits in the tent, Lindemann looks longingly out of the tent up to the mountain's peak as gangrene eats away at his injured leg. The band members eat and rest while bassist Oliver Riedel engraves their names on a pan's lid to leave as a testimony of their presence on the mountain, as others have done. The next day, the band starts to climb the mountain again, carrying Lindemann. In the end, they reach the mountain peak; Lindemann takes a look around and dies satisfied.

== Track listing ==
CD maxi-single

1. Ohne dich (Album Edit) – 4:31
2. Ohne dich (Mina Harker's Version) Remix by Laibach – 4:09
3. Ohne dich (Sacred Mix) Remix by Sven Helbig – 4:34
4. Ohne dich (Schiller Mix) – 5:22
5. Ohne dich (Under Byen Remix) – 5:48
6. Ohne dich (Beta Version) – 4:23

CD single

1. Ohne dich (Album Edit) – 4:31
2. Ohne dich (Mina Harker's Version) Remix by Laibach – 4:09

== Charts ==
Chart (2004)	Peak position
Austria (Ö3 Austria Top 40)	38
Denmark (Tracklisten)	17
Finland (Suomen virallinen lista)	13
Germany (GfK)	12
Hungary (Single Top 40)	7
Netherlands (Single Top 100)	30
Spain (Promusicae)	15
Switzerland (Schweizer Hitparade)	42

== Certifications ==
Region	Certification	Certified units/sales
Germany (BVMI)	Gold	300,000^{‡}
^{‡} Sales+streaming figures based on certification alone.
