= Sonne (Rammstein song) =

2001 song by Rammstein

Single by Rammstein

from the album Mutter
- B-side: "Adios"
- Released: 12 February 2001
- Studio: Miraval (Correns, France)
- Length: 4:32
- Label: Motor; Universal
- Songwriters: Richard Kruspe; Paul Landers; Till Lindemann; Christian Lorenz; Oliver Riedel; Christoph Schneider
- Producers: Jacob Hellner; Rammstein

Rammstein singles chronology
"Asche zu Asche" (2001)	"Sonne" (2001)	"Links 2 3 4" (2001)

Music video
- "Sonne" on YouTube

"Sonne" (German pronunciation: [ˈzɔnə]; English: "Sun") is a song by the German industrial metal band Rammstein. It served as the lead single from their third studio album, Mutter (2001). According to Till Lindemann, the song was originally written as an entrance song for the boxer Vitali Klitschko, whose surname was also the working title of the song. The female vocals come from Spectrasonics' "Symphony of Voices" sample library.

Released on 12 February 2001, "Sonne" peaked at number two on the German Singles Chart, giving Rammstein their fourth top-five hit as well as their highest-charting single (alongside 2004's "Mein Teil" and "Amerika") until "Pussy" reached number one in 2009. It additionally entered the top 10 in Austria, Finland and Spain. The music video for the band's 2019 single "Deutschland" features a piano-based version of "Sonne" in the ending credits.

== Music video ==
The video features the band as the Seven Dwarfs mining gold for Snow White. According to Paul Landers in the Making of Sonne, the idea came from a video made by Oliver Riedel, who mixed the song with parts of Snow White. The role of Snow White was played by Joulia Stepanova.

== Live performances ==
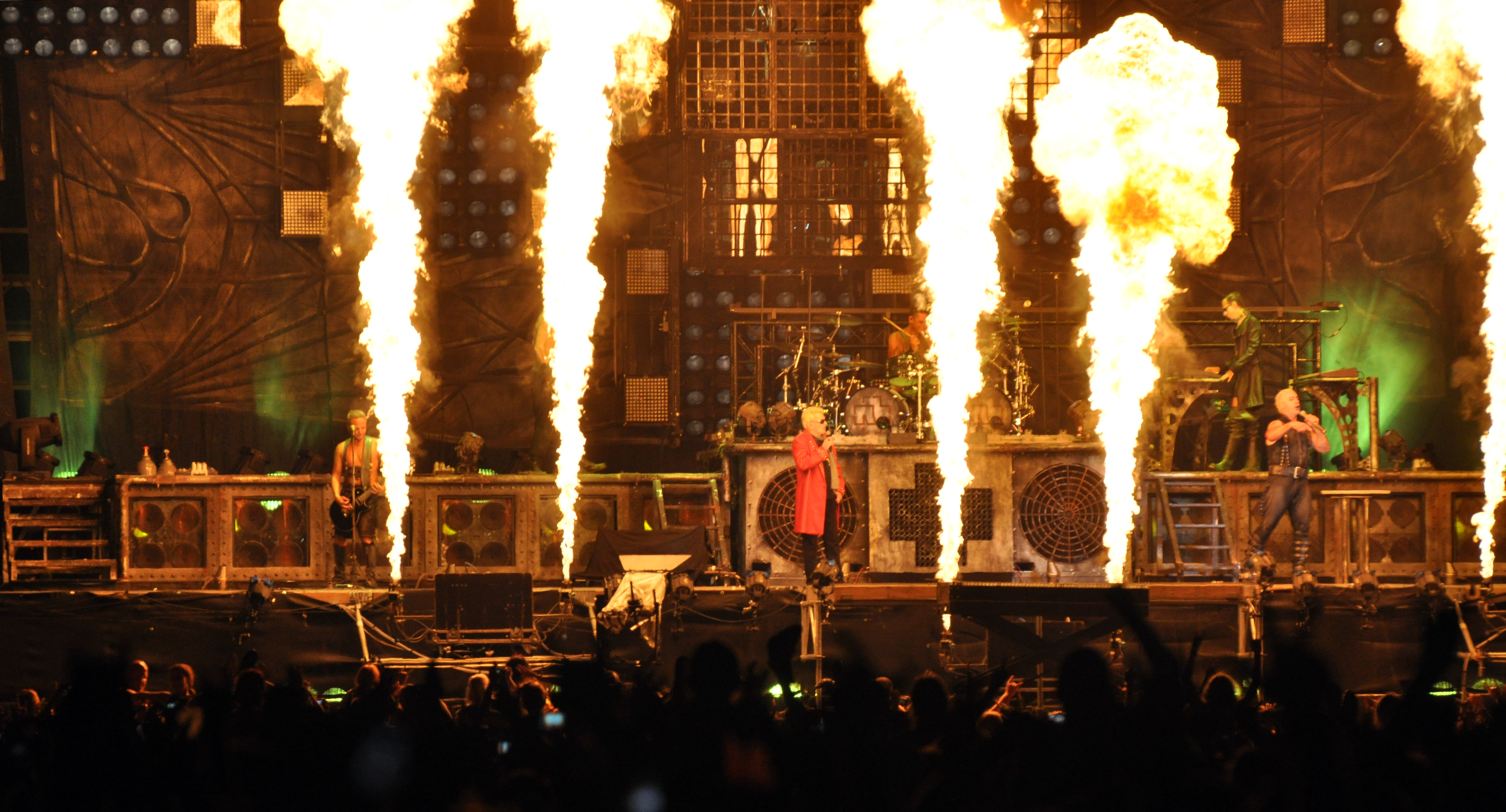
Heino and Rammstein performing Sonne at the Wacken Open Air 2013

The song debuted as "Klitschko" on 16 April 2000. It was very different from the final version released in Mutter. It was played in some concerts on the Japanese/Australia-New Zealand leg of the Sehnsucht tour, before Mutter was released and its tour started. These concerts were the only time the third verse of the song was played; when played live, the band usually omits the final stanza, and instead plays a slightly longer intro and outro.

== Track listing ==
No.	Title	Length
1.	"Sonne"	4:32
2.	"Adios"	3:48
3.	"Sonne" (Clawfinger K.O. remix)	4:11
4.	"Sonne" (Clawfinger T.K.O. remix)	5:52
5.	"Sonne" (instrumental)	4:31
Total length:		22:54

- The single is also available as a two-track CD, featuring "Sonne" and "Adios".

== Charts ==
=== Weekly charts ===
Weekly chart performance for "Sonne"
Chart (2001)	Peak position
Austria (Ö3 Austria Top 40)	5
Belgium (Ultratop 50 Flanders)	44
Canada (Nielsen SoundScan)	47
Europe (Eurochart Hot 100)	13
Finland (Suomen virallinen lista)	9
Germany (GfK)	2
Netherlands (Dutch Top 40)	30
Netherlands (Single Top 100)	24
Poland Airplay (Music & Media)	14
Spain (Promusicae)	6
Sweden (Sverigetopplistan)	42
Switzerland (Schweizer Hitparade)	18

2023 weekly chart performance for "Sonne"
Chart (2023)	Peak position
Lithuania (AGATA)	11

=== Year-end charts ===
Year-end chart performance for "Sonne"
Chart (2001)	Position
Austria (Ö3 Austria Top 40)	50
Canada (Nielsen SoundScan)	198
Germany (Media Control)	41

== Certifications ==
Certifications for "Sonne"
Region	Certification	Certified units/sales
Denmark (IFPI Danmark)	Platinum	90,000^{‡}
Germany (BVMI)	3× Gold	900,000^{‡}
New Zealand (RMNZ)	Platinum	30,000^{‡}
Spain (Promusicae)	Gold	30,000^{‡}
United Kingdom (BPI)	Gold	400,000^{‡}
Streaming
Greece (IFPI Greece)	Gold	1,000,000^{†}
^{‡} Sales+streaming figures based on certification alone.^{†} Streaming-only figures based on certification alone.

== Release history ==
Release dates and formats for "Sonne"
Region	Date	Format(s)	Label(s)	Ref.
Europe	12 February 2001	CD	Motor; Universal	
United States	10 July 2001	Mainstream rock; active rock; alternative radio	Republic; Universal	
