= Reise, Reise =

Studio album by Rammstein
- Released: 27 September 2004
- Recorded: November 2003 – May 2004
- Studio: El Cortijo (Málaga)
- Genres: Neue Deutsche Härte; industrial metal
- Length: 47:45
- Languages: German; English; Russian
- Labels: Universal; Republic
- Producers: Jacob Hellner; Rammstein

Rammstein chronology
Mutter (2001)	Reise, Reise (2004)	Rosenrot (2005)

Singles from Reise, Reise
- 1. "Mein Teil" Released: 26 July 2004; 2. "Amerika" Released: 6 September 2004; 3. "Ohne dich" Released: 22 November 2004; 4. "Keine Lust" Released: 28 February 2005

Alternative cover
- Japanese first edition cover

Reise, Reise (German pronunciation: [ˈʁaɪzə ˈʁaɪzə]; lit. 'Travel, travel') is the fourth studio album by Neue Deutsche Härte band Rammstein. It was released on 27 September 2004 through Universal Music in Germany and followed shortly by its release across Europe. It was later released in North America through Republic Records on 16 November 2004. Recorded at El Cortijo Studios in Málaga, Spain, the album was produced by the band along with Swedish record producer Jacob Hellner.

The album charted in the top ten in several European charts and was a number one hit in Germany, Austria, Switzerland, Iceland, Finland, Estonia and Mexico. As of February 2006, the album has shipped 1.5 million copies globally. Four singles were released from the album: "Mein Teil", "Amerika", "Ohne dich", and "Keine Lust". The follow-up album, Rosenrot, contains six outtakes from Reise, Reise and some new tracks. It was originally intended to be titled Reise, Reise, Vol. II and uses the Arctic-themed artwork from the Japanese release of Reise, Reise.

== Recording ==
Recording for the album began in November 2003 in the El Cortijo Studio in Spain, being produced by Jacob Hellner and Rammstein. The band recorded several songs during the sessions for the Reise, Reise album, which the band initially planned as a double album but later scrapped the idea. 7 songs were omitted from the album's final track listing and were later released on their follow-up album Rosenrot. A statement from the band's management regarding the upcoming collection reads as follows:

After the production period of the album, there were many songs which did not find a place on 'Reise, Reise' due to dramaturgical reason but are now completed. This is not unusual. As 'Ohne Dich' derived from the production of 'Mutter', many songs have been sitting to be completed for a year and shall now come to light. Which songs remains to be seen and is up to the band only.

The record company stated:

"When we were introduced to the tracks of "Reise, Reise", many fascinating songs were among them, which were suddenly missing on the album. Among others I remember one song, which we all believed to be the first single of the album. The song was "Rosenrot", and when we had to realize that the band changed their minds and it did not even make it on to the album, we were speechless. The album was perfect nevertheless, but their enormous self-confidence surprised us."

The mixing sessions for the album took place in April and May 2004 at Toytown Studio in Stockholm, Sweden. A look behind the scenes of the album's recording can be found on the 2006 live compilation Völkerball.

== Composition ==
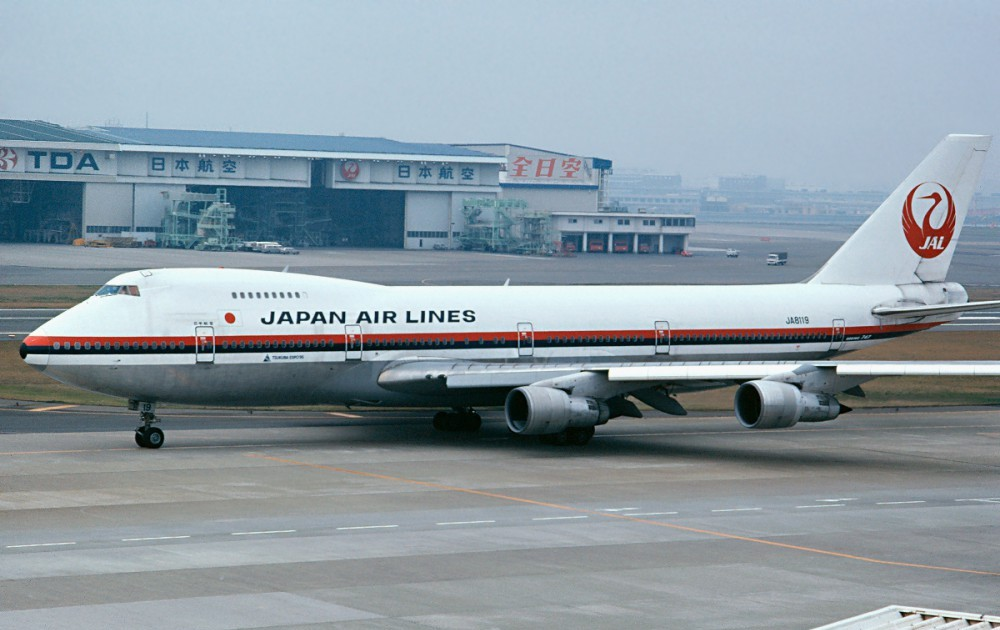
The crash of Japan Air Lines Flight 123 (involved aircraft pictured) served as an influence for the album's lyrics.

=== Themes ===
The album is based on the crash of Japan Air Lines Flight 123 on the evening of 12 August 1985. Twelve minutes into its flight, the Boeing 747 suffered an explosive decompression due to failure of its rear pressure bulkhead, caused by a faulty repair 7 years earlier. The explosion tore off most of the aircraft's vertical stabilizer and ruptured all four of the hydraulic systems, causing the loss of all flight control surfaces and rendering the aircraft uncontrollable. The pilots fought to keep the aircraft aloft for nearly 32 minutes, but eventually became trapped in the towering mountain ranges surrounding Mount Fuji and crashed, killing 520 out of the 524 passengers and crew on board. It remains the deadliest single-aircraft disaster in history. Some pressings of the album contain a recording of the last 30 seconds of the flight as an easter egg hidden in the pregap.

=== Songs and lyrics ===
"Amerika" is probably the group's most overt political statement to date, revolving around the recurring English-language chorus "We're all living in America, Amerika ist wunderbar, We're all living in America, America, America". It is perhaps not the most nuanced attack of American cultural hegemony and political imperialism, but it is spirited and catchy nonetheless, a fine addition to the group's tradition of crafting ineffably catchy anthemic sing-alongs.

— "Amerika" review by PopMatters

The album "revels in the type of paradoxical, multi-faceted existentialism which comes second nature to Germans but is persistently untranslatable to Americans" and it opens with the track "Reise, Reise" which means "journey, journey" or "rise, rise", and "we are immediately put on notice that this particular journey will be a grim and harrowing one, leavened by German existentialism in the grand tradition of Mann and Goethe." The song's lyrics deal with the life of sailors and was intended as a reference to Herman Melville's novel Moby-Dick. The references to Goethe come in "Dalai Lama", a modern version of Goethe's poem "Der Erlkönig", set in an aeroplane rather than on a horse; the title is claimed to be a reference to the 14th Dalai Lama's fear of flying, while a more sound point of view is a reference to the serfdom in Tibet.

The song "Amerika" deals with the worldwide political and cultural imperialism of the United States of America. The song's two verses are sung in German with a chorus in English: "We're all living in Amerika, Amerika ist wunderbar, We're all living in Amerika, Amerika, Amerika." The band views it as a satirical commentary on "Americanization", and it features mentions of Coca-Cola, Mickey Mouse, and Santa Claus.

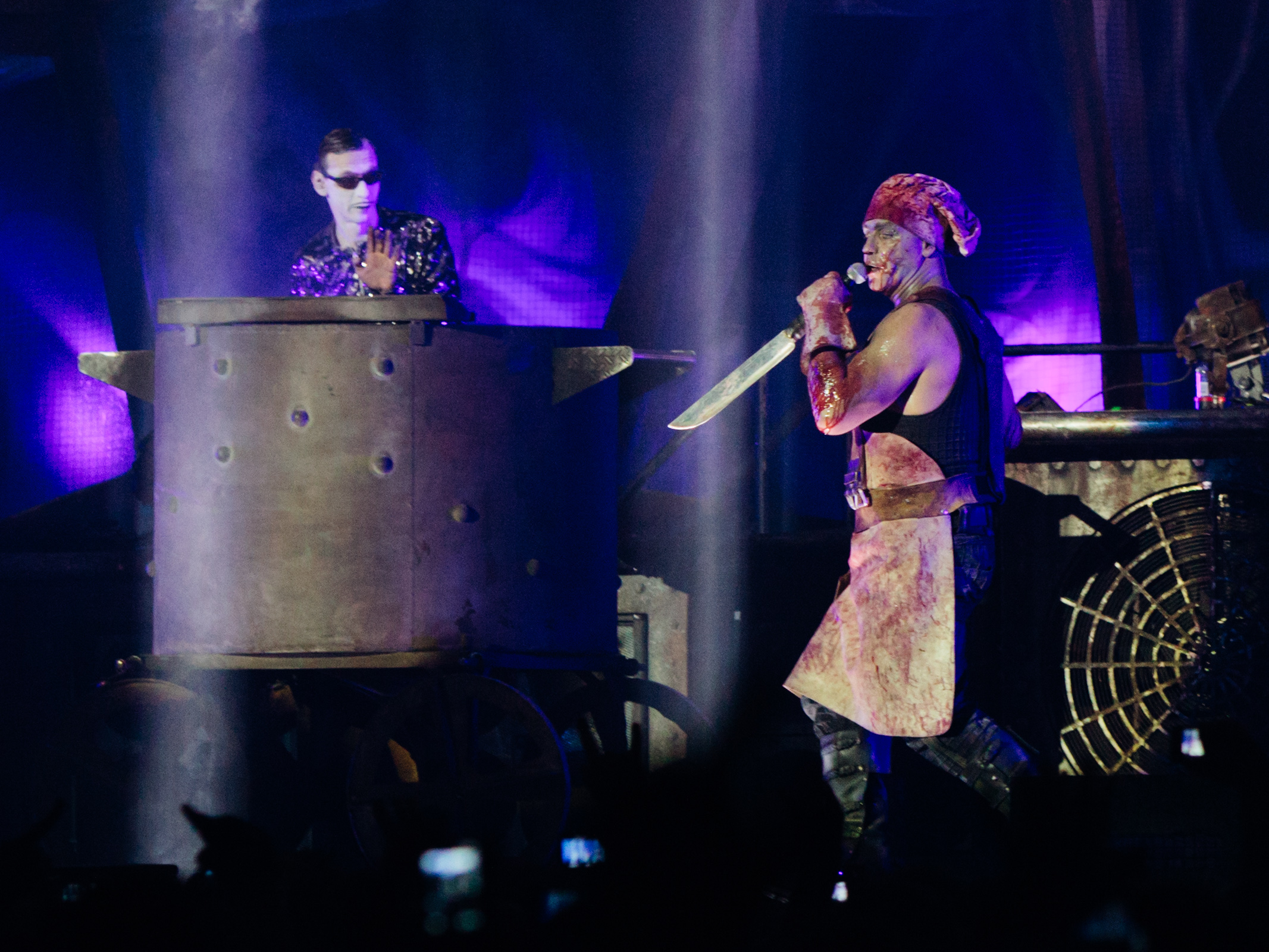
"Mein Teil" is based on the Armin Meiwes cannibalism case. As a result, live performances of the song feature Till Lindemann cooking Flake Lorenz in a large pot.

The song "Mein Teil" is about Armin Meiwes, a man who achieved international notoriety for killing and eating a voluntary victim whom he had found via the Internet. After Meiwes and the victim jointly attempted to eat the victim's severed penis, Meiwes killed his victim and proceeded to eat a large amount of his flesh. Because of his acts, Meiwes is also known as the Rotenburg Cannibal or Der Metzgermeister (The Master Butcher). According to Rammstein's bassist Oliver Riedel, the song came about after "one of our members brought a newspaper to rehearsal and it had a story about the cannibal guy in it. We were fascinated, shocked and amused at the same time." Vocalist Till Lindemann stated, "It's so sick that it becomes fascinating and there just has to be a song about it". "Mein Teil" attracted controversy in Germany; the media dubbed it the "Kannibalensong" (cannibal song), which helped to boost it to second place in the German music charts after its release in early August 2004. Remixes of the song were done by Arthur Baker and the Pet Shop Boys. At the beginning of the song in the video, the phrase "Suche gut gebauten Achtzehn- bis Dreißigjährigen zum Schlachten – Der Metzgermeister" ("Looking for a well built 18 to 30-year-old to be slaughtered – The Master Butcher") is spoken, voiced by Ollie, although the album version of the song does not have this beginning. The quote is taken from an online post by Armin Meiwes.

"Ohne dich" ("Without You") is a power ballad. It is seen as expressing mourning over the loss of a loved person. It follows a slow, even romantic ballad style. The central motif is "Without you, I cannot be..., With you, I am alone also..." The song was also remixed by Slovenian avant-garde band Laibach.

"Los" is a German suffix meaning "-less" (as in "meaningless"), but it is also an adjective meaning "off" or "loose", and when used as a command it means "go!". The track itself is reminiscent of Depeche Mode's early work, with repetitive acoustic guitar and a stripped-down, insistent beat. The album ends with the track "Amour", one of the most intimate love songs written by the band. In the context of a disc filled with the imagery of "great black gaps in the fabric of human rationality", Rammstein somehow manage to make "honest and sincere romance seem just slightly alien, and tinted with enough melancholy to satisfy the heartiest emo-kid." There's also a guitar solo towards the end, another uncharacteristic gesture in the album.

== Release and artwork ==
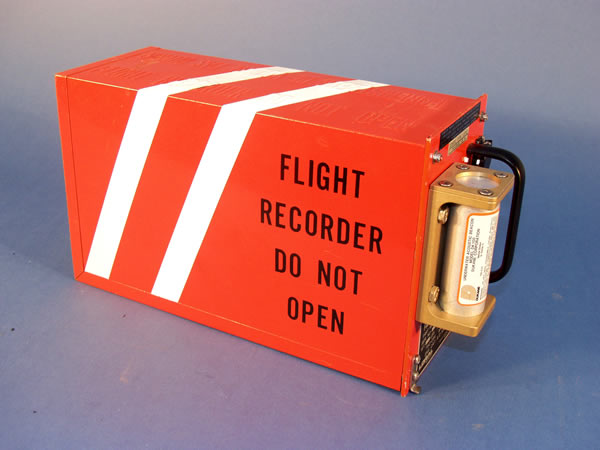
The packaging of Reise, Reise is meant to resemble a cockpit voice recorder.

On the U.S. release, the "easter egg" fragment is placed at the beginning of "Reise, Reise" in normal playback. The 2005 pressing does not contain the easter egg, but the original 2004 pressing does. On the European version the easter egg is in negative time, to access it, you must rewind the CD past the beginning of "Reise, Reise". The American iTunes version of "Reise, Reise" also contains the easter egg. On 21 April 2005, Rammstein released a special Japanese version of Reise, Reise, with different cover art, which was later used as the Rosenrot cover art, though the Rammstein logo on the ship was altered into the text "Rosenrot". The booklet also features the same art as Rosenrot, but with the songs from Reise, Reise. The easter egg is not present in negative time as it is on the European version. It features two bonus tracks: "Mein Teil (You Are What You Eat Edit)" and "Amerika (Digital Hardcore Mix)". The Japanese limited Edition has a bonus DVD featuring footage from Lichtspielhaus. The Japanese limited Edition was re-issued in 2009 as SHM-CD and DVD edition, featuring the original orange cover art.

The album artwork shows a damaged aeroplane cockpit voice recorder depicted on the front and back covers. Its caption ("Flugrekorder, nicht öffnen") means "Flight Recorder, Do Not Open". The inner part of the Digipak edition case shows a picture of the six members in suits wielding suitcases and weapons (like Michael Douglas in Falling Down) leaving from a crashed aeroplane. The cover art is an allusion to the song "Dalai Lama", which deals with an aeroplane accident. It is also suggestive of the overarching "travelling" theme of the album. While past albums have all featured the six band members in various photographic scenarios, "Reise Reise" features a minimal packaging, and there are no photographs featuring the band members.

== Reception ==
=== Critical ===
Professional ratings
Review scores
Source	Rating
AllMusic	4/5 stars
BBC	3/5 stars
Entertainment Weekly	C+
DIY	3.5/5 stars
Melodic	4.5/5 stars
PopMatters	8/10
Release Magazine	8/10
Rolling Stone	3/5 stars
Sputnikmusic	5/5

Upon its release, the album received generally positive reviews from critics. David Jeffries from AllMusic gave the album a rating of three out of five stars, and stated that the album's content "is more of the same: the same grit, the same growl, and the same dramatic, orchestra choruses" and that "the lead single, 'Mein Teil' is no 'Du Hast' but the damning 'Amerika' almost equals their breakthrough track." He also said that there was a bit more ingenuity in the production and a little more focus in the songs but it wasn't "enough for the nonfaithful to pick up on." Jeffries highlighted the track "Stein Um Stein" because it "creeps more than stomps in parts". He also mentioned that the track "Los" features a bluesy guitar that "adds some quirk to the band's stern Teutonic pallette." He finished his review saying "few bands can industrially grind as convincingly as Rammstein. Same as it ever was, "Reise, Reise" won't do much to increase the band's fan base, but being a tight, free-of-filler album, it'll satisfy the faithful." Vaz Malik from the BBC also gave the album a mixed review and said that the band could probably be "a lot bigger" in the United States if they opted to sing in English, but "German sounds a lot more threatening and it's done them no harm in their homeland." He stated that the songs "Morgenstern" and "Stein Um Stein" probably have weak translations but in German they sound mean. He said "that tracks like 'Amerika' make the admission price worth while. Rammstein say it's their most commercial song to date. Well more like this please because it's funny but rocks at the same time." Tim O'Neil from PopMatters gave the album a favorable review and said: "for those with the patience to look beyond the "Teutonic bluster" and punk insouciance, "Reise Reise" will be a uniquely rewarding experience."

=== Commercial ===
The album sold 26,716 copies in the United States in its first week of release in November 2004 to debut at position no. 61 on The Billboard 200 chart. It was in the top ten in several European charts and reached number one in Germany, Austria, Switzerland, Iceland, Finland, Estonia and Mexico. As of February 2006, the album has shipped 1.5 million copies globally.

== Track listing ==
All tracks are written by Rammstein (Richard Kruspe, Paul Landers, Till Lindemann, Christian Lorenz, Oliver Riedel, Christoph Schneider).

No.	Title	Length
1.	"Reise, Reise" ("Arise, Arise")	4:11
2.	"Mein Teil" ("My Part")	4:32
3.	"Dalai Lama"	5:38
4.	"Keine Lust" ("No Desire")	3:43
5.	"Los" ("Go")	4:24
6.	"Amerika" ("America")	3:47
7.	"Moskau" ("Moscow" feat. Viktoria Fersh)	4:16
8.	"Morgenstern" ("Morning Star")	4:00
9.	"Stein um Stein" ("Stone by Stone")	3:52
10.	"Ohne dich" ("Without You")	4:31
11.	"Amour" ("Love")	4:51
Total length:		47:45

Japanese Special Edition bonus tracks
No.	Title	Music	Length
12.	"Mein Teil" (You Are What You Eat Edit)	Pet Shop Boys	4:07
13.	"Amerika" (Digital Hardcore Mix)	Alec Empire	3:52
Total length:			55:44

- Japanese Special Edition also have a bonus DVD with 20 minute exclusive footage of Lichtspielhaus.

Notes

- 2004 CD pressings of the album contain the hidden pregap track "Flugzeuglärm" ("Airplane Noise"), containing the last seconds of cockpit voice recorder audio from Japan Air Lines Flight 123. The track runs for 0:36, making the album runtime 48:21. Later pressings did not include this track.

== Personnel ==
Rammstein

- Till Lindemann – lead vocals
- Richard Kruspe – lead guitar, backing vocals
- Paul Landers – rhythm guitar, backing vocals
- Oliver Riedel – bass guitar
- Christoph Schneider – drums
- Christian Lorenz – keyboards

Additional musicians

- Viktoria Fersh – vocals (track 7)
- Bärbel Bühler – oboe (track 10)
- Michael Kaden – accordion (tracks 1, 7)
- Olsen Involtini – string arrangements (tracks 9, 10)
- Sven Helbig – string arrangements (tracks 1, 9), choir arrangements (tracks 2, 6, 8)
- Kinderchor Canzonetta – choir (track 6)
- Dresdner Kammerchor – choir (tracks 2, 6, 8), conducted by Andreas Pabst
- Deutsches Filmorchester Babelsberg – Orchestra parts, conducted by Wolf Kerschek, coordination by Nucleus, Jens Kuphal
- Köpenicker Zupforchester – Mandolin (track 10)

== Charts ==
=== Weekly charts ===
Weekly chart performance for Reise, Reise
Chart (2004–2005)	Peak position
Australian Albums (ARIA)	19
Austrian Albums (Ö3 Austria)	1
Belgian Albums (Ultratop Flanders)	5
Belgian Albums (Ultratop Wallonia)	4
Canadian Albums (Billboard)	18
Czech Albums (ČNS IFPI)	3
Danish Albums (Hitlisten)	3
Dutch Albums (Album Top 100)	2
Finnish Albums (Suomen virallinen lista)	1
French Albums (SNEP)	3
German Albums (Offizielle Top 100)	1
Hungarian Albums (MAHASZ)	21
Irish Albums (IRMA)	54
New Zealand Albums (RMNZ)	17
Norwegian Albums (VG-lista)	4
Polish Albums (ZPAV)	4
Portuguese Albums (AFP)	6
Scottish Albums (Official Charts)	31
Spanish Albums (PROMUSICAE)	7
Swedish Albums (Sverigetopplistan)	2
Swiss Albums (Schweizer Hitparade)	1
UK Albums (Official Charts)	37
UK Rock & Metal Albums (Official Charts)	3
US Billboard 200	61

2023 weekly chart performance for Reise, Reise
Chart (2023)	Peak position
Lithuanian Albums (AGATA)	20

=== Year-end charts ===
2004 year-end chart performance for Reise, Reise
Chart (2004)	Position
Austrian Albums (Ö3 Austria)	17
Belgian Albums (Ultratop Flanders)	25
Belgian Albums (Ultratop Wallonia)	74
Dutch Albums (Album Top 100)	36
French Albums (SNEP)	164
German Albums (Offizielle Top 100)	18
Swedish Albums (Sverigetopplistan)	36
Swiss Albums (Schweizer Hitparade)	19

2005 year-end chart performance for Reise, Reise
Chart (2005)	Position
Belgian Albums (Ultratop Flanders)	50
German Albums (Offizielle Top 100)	47
Swiss Albums (Schweizer Hitparade)	98

== Certifications ==
Certifications for Reise, Reise
Region	Certification	Certified units/sales
Austria (IFPI Austria)	Platinum	30,000^{*}
Denmark (IFPI Danmark)	Gold	20,000^{^}
Germany (BVMI)	7× Gold	700,000^{‡}
Russia (NFPF)	2× Platinum	40,000^{*}
Sweden (GLF)	Gold	30,000^{^}
Switzerland (IFPI Switzerland)	Platinum	40,000^{^}
United Kingdom (BPI)	Gold	100,000^{‡}
Summaries
Europe (IFPI)	Platinum	1,000,000^{*}
^{*} Sales figures based on certification alone.^{^} Shipments figures based on certification alone.^{‡} Sales+streaming figures based on certification alone.

== Release history ==
Release history for Reise, Reise
Country	Date
Europe	27 September 2004
United States	6 November 2004

== Notes and references ==
Notes
