= Mein Teil =

2004 song by Rammstein

Single by Rammstein

from the album Reise, Reise
- Language: German
- English title: "My Part"/"My Share"
- Released: 26 July 2004
- Studio: El Cortijo (Málaga, Spain)
- Genre: Neue Deutsche Härte
- Length: 4:32
- Label: Universal
- Songwriters: Richard Kruspe; Paul Landers; Till Lindemann; Christian Lorenz; Oliver Riedel; Christoph Schneider
- Producers: Jacob Hellner; Rammstein

Rammstein singles chronology
"Feuer frei!" (2002)	"Mein Teil" (2004)	"Amerika" (2004)

Music video
- "Mein Teil" on YouTube

"Mein Teil" (German for "My Part" or "My Share") is a song by German Neue Deutsche Härte band Rammstein. It was released as the lead single from their fourth studio album, Reise, Reise (2004), on 26 July 2004. It was Rammstein's first number-one single, topping the Spanish Singles Chart. Remixes of the song were done by Arthur Baker and Pet Shop Boys. "Mein Teil" was nominated for Best Metal Performance at the 48th Grammy Awards but lost to Slipknot's "Before I Forget". "Mein Teil" attracted controversy in Germany; the media dubbed it „Das Kannibalenlied“ ("The Cannibal Song") due to its lyrics referring to the Armin Meiwes cannibalism case.

== Background and composition ==
The song is inspired by the case of Armin Meiwes and Bernd Jürgen Brandes. In March 2001, in Rotenburg an der Fulda, the two men aged in their 40s met each other, cut off and cooked Brandes' penis and attempted to consume it together. Afterwards, Meiwes killed Brandes, dismembered him and then stored and ate his remains over the next 10 months until he was caught in December 2002. As a result, Meiwes was sentenced to eight-and-a-half years in jail for manslaughter, but was later charged with murder and sentenced to life imprisonment.

According to bassist Oliver "Ollie" Riedel, the song came about after "one of our members brought a newspaper to rehearsal and it had a story about the cannibal guy in it. We were fascinated, shocked and amused at the same time". Vocalist Till Lindemann stated, "It is so sick that it becomes fascinating and there just has to be a song about it".

== Music video ==
The video for "Mein Teil" was directed by Zoran Bihac. It depicts Christoph Schneider cross-dressed as Armin Meiwes' mother, Till Lindemann receiving oral sex from an angel (played by Luciana Regina) before he eats her wings and kills her; Christian Lorenz performing ballet in a hallucinatory state; Paul Landers shaking, screaming violently and wandering around in a frantic and crazed state; Richard Kruspe violently fighting with his doppelgänger; Oliver Riedel writhing on the floor in painful spasms with his skin covered in white powder, in a style closely resembling the Japanese dance form of butoh; the band fighting in a mudpit; and Schneider leading the rest of the band on leashes as they crawl out of the Deutsche Oper U-Bahn (subway) station and behave like dogs.

At the beginning of the song in the video, the phrase „Suche gut gebauten Achtzehn- bis Dreißigjährigen zum Schlachten – Der Metzgermeister“ ("Looking for [a] well built 18- to 30-year-old to slaughter – The Master Butcher") is spoken, voiced by Riedel, although the album version of the song does not have this beginning. The quote is taken from an online post by Armin Meiwes.

The controversy over "Mein Teil" prompted MTV Germany to restrict the airing of the music video to after 11 PM.

== Live performances ==
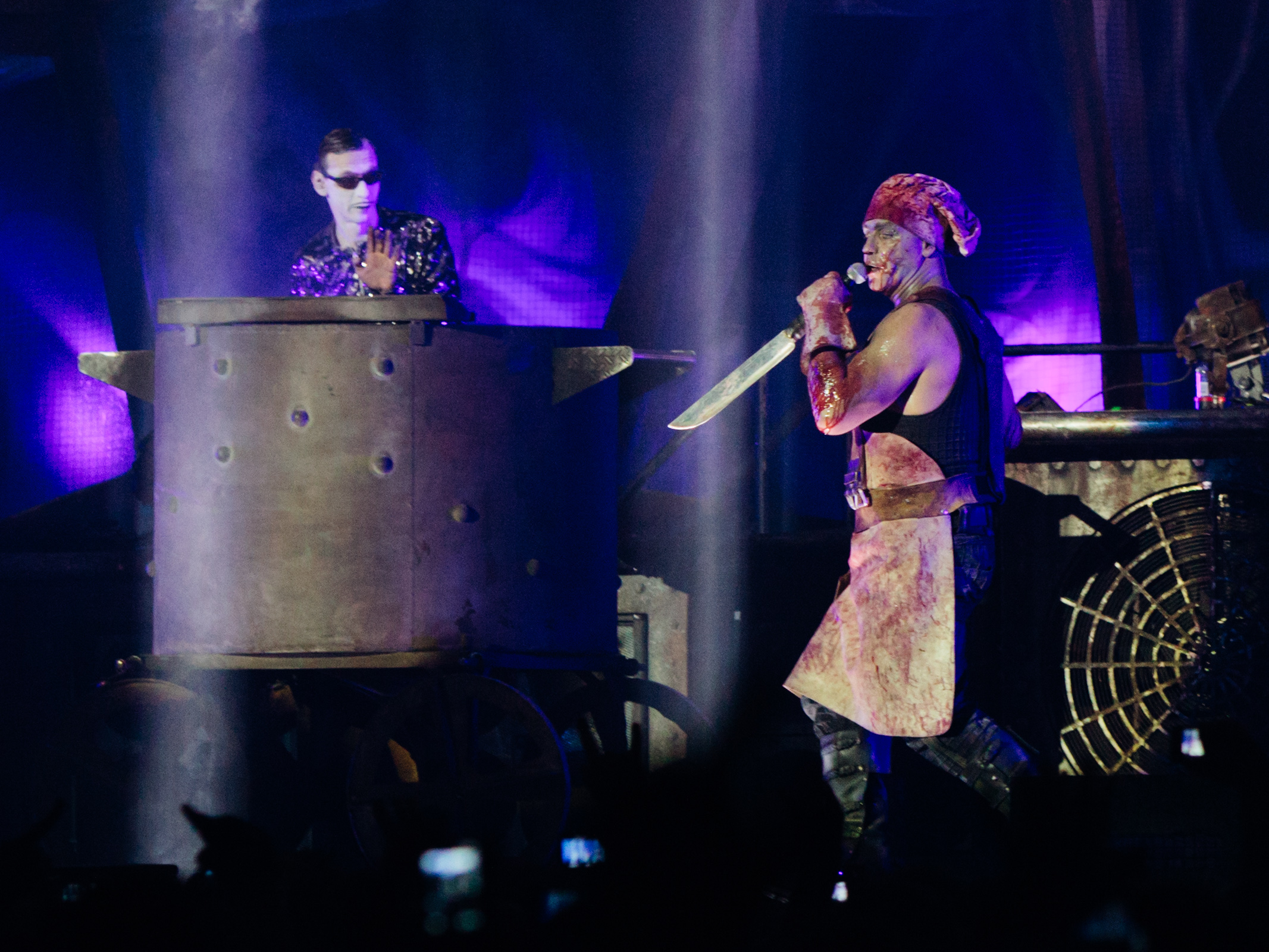
Lorenz (left) and Lindemann during a live performance of "Mein Teil" in 2012

It debuted in three consecutive concerts for members of the fan club, in October 2004. This song is one of the most notable live performances of the 2004–2005 Reise, Reise tour. From the central backstage access, Till Lindemann appears pulling a giant cooking pot. He is dressed as a blood-stained chef holding a microphone with a large, real cooking knife attached to the end. Keyboardist Christian "Flake" Lorenz appears in the pot, with metal cylinders attached to his arms and legs, and plays the keyboard during the song. After the second chorus, Till takes a flamethrower and roasts the bottom of the pot, "cooking" Flake. Flake escapes from the pot and starts running around the stage with flames erupting from his arms and legs, while chased by a knife-wielding Till.

When Flake was asked about what it is like to perform this, he said: "It is fine. It is only pain. Although one can not breathe in, because then one would inhale the flames and die". Due to all of the theatrical performance, the song usually extended to six or seven minutes when played live. It was played at every concert of the Ahoi Tour, but was dropped on the Liebe ist für alle da Tour, a move which irritated many fans. However, it returned to playlist for the Latin American leg of the tour in 2010, the Auckland and Perth legs of the Big Day Out festival and the South African leg of the tour in 2011, all replacing "Ich tu dir weh" except on the Brazilian leg of the South America tour, where both songs were played. The song has since returned to the playlist of the Made in Germany 1995–2011 concert tour. They dropped the live performance again in 2016, until 2019, when it was included in the setlist for their Europe Stadium Tour. It has been included on the setlist for the Europe Stadium Tour and North American Stadium Tour of 2022, and also for the Europe Stadium Tour 2023 and 2024.

== Track listing ==
CD single

1. "Mein Teil" (Single Version) – 4:23
2. "Mein Teil" (You Are What You Eat Edit) Remix by Pet Shop Boys – 4:07
3. "Mein Teil" (Return to New York Buffet Mix) Remix by Arthur Baker – 7:22
4. "Mein Teil" (There Are No Guitars on This Mix) Remix by Pet Shop Boys – 7:20
- The Australian edition also features the "Mein Teil" video.

Mini-CD single

1. "Mein Teil" (Single Version) – 4:23
2. "Mein Teil" (You Are What You Eat Edit) Remix by Pet Shop Boys – 4:07
- Also released as a two-track CD single.

2 x 12-inch vinyl single (limited to 1000 copies)

1. "Mein Teil" (You Are What You Eat Mix) Remix by Pet Shop Boys – 6:45
2. "Mein Teil" (You Are What You Eat Instrumental Mix) Remix by Pet Shop Boys – 7:00
3. "Mein Teil" (The Return to New York Buffet Mix) Remix by Arthur Baker – 7:22
4. "Mein Teil" (The Return to New York Buffet Instrumental Mix) Remix by Arthur Baker – 7:23

== Charts ==
=== Weekly charts ===
Weekly chart performance for "Mein Teil"
Chart (2004)	Peak position
Australia (ARIA)	69
Austria (Ö3 Austria Top 40)	6
Belgium (Ultratop 50 Flanders)	40
Belgium (Ultratop 50 Wallonia)	10
Denmark (Tracklisten)	6
Finland (Suomen virallinen lista)	2
France (SNEP)	28
Germany (GfK)	2
Hungary (Dance Top 40)	40
Hungary (Single Top 40)	5
Italy (FIMI)	44
Netherlands (Single Top 100)	15
Norway (VG-lista)	11
Scottish Singles Sales (Official Charts)	63
Spain (Promusicae)	1
Sweden (Sverigetopplistan)	8
Switzerland (Schweizer Hitparade)	11
UK Singles (Official Charts)	61
UK Rock & Metal (Official Charts)	1

=== Year-end charts ===
Year-end chart performance for "Mein Teil"
Chart (2004)	Position
Germany (Media Control GfK)	55

== Citations ==
1. "Strange tastes", Sunday Herald Sun (Melbourne, Australia), 24 October 2004
2. "German cannibal inspires hard rockers Rammstein to new hit", Agence France Presse, 27 August 2004
3. "Shock'n'roll Circus", The Times (London), 29 January 2005
