= Amerika (song) =

Single by Rammstein

from the album Reise, Reise
- B-side: "Wilder Wein"; "Mein Herz brennt"
- Released: 13 September 2004
- Studio: El Cortijo (Málaga, Spain)
- Genre: Neue Deutsche Härte
- Length: 3:46
- Label: Universal
- Songwriters: Richard Kruspe; Paul Landers; Till Lindemann; Christian Lorenz; Oliver Riedel; Christoph Schneider
- Producers: Jacob Hellner; Rammstein

Rammstein singles chronology
"Mein Teil" (2004)	"Amerika" (2004)	"Ohne dich" (2004)

Music video
- "Amerika" on YouTube

Audio sample
- file; help

"Amerika" is a song by German Neue Deutsche Härte band Rammstein. It was released on 13 September 2004 as the second single from their fourth studio album, Reise, Reise (2004). The song peaked at number two in Germany and entered the top five in Austria, Denmark, Hungary and Switzerland.

== Content ==
The chorus of the song comes from a song called "Living in America" by Swedish band the Sounds. The song is intended as a commentary on the worldwide cultural and political imperialism of the United States of America. The song's lyrics, as well as its video, are a critique of America's cultural imperialism, political propaganda and role as a global policeman. The two verses are sung in German with a chorus in Denglisch: "We're all living in Amerika. Amerika ist wunderbar. We're all living in Amerika, Amerika, Amerika." and "We're all living in Amerika: Coca-Cola, Wonderbra. We're all living in Amerika, Amerika, Amerika." as well as a reprise: "We're all living in Amerika: Coca-Cola; sometimes, war." The band views it as a satire on Americanization, and the lyrics make reference to various corporate and cultural symbols of America as Coca-Cola, Wonderbra, Santa Claus, and Mickey Mouse. Uncharacteristically for Rammstein, the song incorporates an interlude in which the lyrics explicitly state the band's intentions: "This is not a love song, This is not a love song, I don't sing my mother tongue, No this is not a love song".

== Music video ==
The video shows the band in Apollo-era space suits (Note: Two of these are stage reproductions of Apollo 11 suits, but as there is a shortage of such suits for more than a small Apollo crew, the other four suits are contemporary Space Shuttle EMU suits with the chest-mounted control box and the hard upper torso.) on the Moon, with shots of other cultures acting like stereotypical Americans, satirizing Americanization. These shots include Africans eating pizza and making Christmas wishes to Santa Claus, Buddhist monks eating hamburgers, South East Asians, Japanese, Native Americans, Inuit, Melanesians, an Indian Sikh man smoking a Lucky Strike cigarette and a Muslim man worshipping in front of an oil refinery after removing his Nike sneakers. Near the end, various ethnic groups sing and dance along. The end of the video shows that the band have actually been in a fake Moon set in a studio, complete with film crew, an allusion to the Moon landing conspiracy theories. Till Lindemann, Rammstein's lead singer, wears a space suit with the name "Armstrong" on it, a reference to Neil Armstrong. The video ends with a band photograph left behind on the Moon's surface while the recording of Jack Swigert's quote "Houston, we've had a problem here" is being played.

== Live performance ==
As with every song from Reise, Reise (except "Ohne dich"), "Amerika" debuted live in three consecutive concerts for members of the Rammstein fan club. During the live performances of this song on tour, Flake is often seen riding around on a Segway PT with confetti cannons firing red, white and blue confetti in a parody of a ticker-tape parade. It was the last song of the band's main set, and was played at every concert of the Reise, Reise tour. During a concert in Gothenburg, Sweden on 30 July 2005, frontman Till Lindemann suffered a knee injury when keyboardist Flake accidentally ran into him with the Segway PT; this caused concerts scheduled in Asia to be cancelled.

== Track listing ==
CD single

1. "Amerika"
2. "Amerika" (English Version)
3. "Amerika" (Digital Hardcore Mix) by Alec Empire
4. "Amerika" (Western-Remix) by Olsen Involtini
5. "Amerika" (Andy Panthen & Mat Diaz's Clubmix)
6. "Amerika" (Electro Ghetto Remix) by Bushido & Ilan
7. "Amerika" (Jam & Spoon So Kann's Gehen Mix)
8. "Mein Herz brennt Orchesterlied V"
- Released in a jewelcase, digipack and as a digital download

Pock-it CD

1. "Amerika"
2. "Amerika" (Digital Hardcore Mix) by Alec Empire
- A 2-track CD single was also released in a card sleeve

UK 7-inch vinyl

1. "Amerika"
2. "Wilder Wein"

Australian edition

1. "Amerika"
2. "Amerika" (Digital Hardcore Mix) by Alec Empire
3. "Amerika" (Western-Remix) by Olsen Involtini
4. "Amerika" (Andy Panthen & Mat Diaz's Clubmix)
5. "Mein Herz brennt" (Orchestra Version)

UK version

1. "Amerika"
2. "Amerika" (Digital Hardcore Mix) by Alec Empire
3. "Mein Herz brennt"
4. "Ich will Orchesterlied VII"

UK DVD

1. "Amerika" (Video) – 4:19
2. Making of the Amerika Video – 12:01
3. "Amerika" (Album Version) – 3:46

== Charts ==
=== Weekly charts ===
Weekly chart performance for "Amerika"
Chart (2004)	Peak position
Australia (ARIA)	81
Austria (Ö3 Austria Top 40)	3
Belgium (Ultratop 50 Flanders)	36
Belgium (Ultratip Bubbling Under Wallonia)	4
Canada (Nielsen SoundScan)	32
Denmark (Tracklisten)	2
Finland (Suomen virallinen lista)	10
France (SNEP)	89
Germany (GfK)	2
Hungary (Single Top 40)	4
Italy (FIMI)	46
Netherlands (Dutch Top 40)	22
Netherlands (Single Top 100)	16
Norway (VG-lista)	13
Scottish Singles Sales (Official Charts)	38
Spain (Promusicae)	9
Sweden (Sverigetopplistan)	21
Switzerland (Schweizer Hitparade)	5
UK Singles (Official Charts)	38
UK Rock & Metal (Official Charts)	4

=== Year-end charts ===
Year-end chart performance for "Amerika"
Chart (2004)	Position
Austria (Ö3 Austria Top 40)	54
Germany (Media Control GfK)	31
Switzerland (Schweizer Hitparade)	86

== Certifications ==
Certifications for "Amerika"
Region	Certification	Certified units/sales
Denmark (IFPI Danmark)	Gold	45,000^{‡}
Germany (BVMI)	Gold	150,000^{‡}
^{‡} Sales+streaming figures based on certification alone.

== See also ==
- List of anti-war songs
