= Du hast =

1997 single by Rammstein

Single by Rammstein

from the album Sehnsucht
- B-side: "Bück dich"; Remixes
- Released: 19 July 1997
- Recorded: 1996–1997
- Studio: Temple (Mistra, Malta)
- Genre: Neue Deutsche Härte; industrial metal; nu metal
- Length: 3:55
- Label: Motor; London; Slash
- Songwriters: Richard Kruspe; Paul Landers; Till Lindemann; Christian Lorenz; Oliver Riedel; Christoph Schneider
- Producers: Jacob Hellner; Rammstein

Rammstein singles chronology
"Engel" (1997)	"Du hast" (1997)	"Sehnsucht" (1997)

Audio sample
- The intro to "Du Hast".: file; help

Music video
- "Du hast" on YouTube

"Du hast" (lit. 'You Have') is a song by German metal band Rammstein. It was released as the second single from their second album Sehnsucht (1997). It has appeared on numerous soundtracks for films, most notably The Matrix: Music from the Motion Picture, How High, and the home video CKY2K. It is featured in the music video games Guitar Hero 5 and Rock Band 3. The song's title is a play on the homophones du hasst ("you hate") and du hast ("you have").

== Overview ==
There are two versions of the song: the original version completely in German, and a second version partially in English (found on special editions of the Sehnsucht album). In the second version, the first chorus and the verses are in English and the last chorus is in German. The English lyrics are not a direct translation of the German; the original lyrics take advantage of a pair of German homophones: when conjugated in the second person singular form (i.e. "you"), the verbs haben (to have) and hassen (to hate) become respectively du hast and du hasst, which sound identical. The guitar riff is similar to Ministry's "Just One Fix". The music was written by keyboardist Flake and guitarist Richard Kruspe. The intro section and the verses were a combination of a synth sequence by Flake and a guitar riff by Kruspe, and the chorus was written around a chord sequence by Flake.

== Live performances ==
The first known performance of the song dates from 9 April 1997 in Amsterdam, Netherlands. Over the years, several stunts have been used during the live performances of "Du hast", ranging from the dildo used in "Bück dich", to the bow used in "Du riechst so gut". In their Reise, Reise and Liebe ist für alle da tours, flames shoot several feet into the air and Till Lindemann fired with a different bow into the air, "starting" a chain reaction that fired rockets over the audience. Being a fan favourite, it has been played at almost every concert to date since its initial performance. When performed live, the intro is always a bit longer than the studio version.

The song has been covered by Motionless in White for Punk Goes 90s Vol. 2 in 2014 and was referenced by Lizzo while performing in Germany in 2023.

== Music video ==
The music video for the song was directed by Philipp Stölzl, and was summed up by one review as "crime, masks, love, violence, betrayal, fire and booze". It begins with Rammstein drummer Christoph Schneider pulling up outside an isolated building in a car with a woman played by German actress Astrid Meyerfeldt, whom Schneider kisses and embraces. The video then cuts to masked men aggressively singing towards the camera, before cutting back and forth between this and Schneider taking a handgun out of a bag in the car and tucking it into his belt as he enters the building. Inside, he sees the masked men lined up behind a chair. They remove their masks to reveal that they are the other members of the band, and a relieved Schneider releases his grip from the gun and embraces them, drinking and celebrating with them. All the while, the woman waits nervously outside, first in the car, and then pacing outside of it, then sitting on the ground beside it smoking a cigarette, as dusk falls. More imagery from inside the building appears to show Till smacking someone from camera view, then the band members menacing someone on the floor emphasizing the song chorus, then administering an unknown substance with a syringe, then a figure walking engulfed in flames. The video ends with Schneider and the rest of the band walking out of the building in an abreast row and past the car, with Schneider glancing at the woman leaning against it and checking his watch before the car detonates, but the woman's fate is unconfirmed.

== Track listing ==
All tracks are written by Rammstein.

No.	Title	Length
1.	"Du hast (Single Version)"	3:54
2.	"Bück dich (Album Version)"	3:21
3.	"Du hast (Remix by Jacob Hellner)"	6:44
4.	"Du hast (Remix by Clawfinger)"	5:23

== Charts ==
=== Weekly charts ===
Weekly chart performance for "Du hast"
Chart (1997–1998)	Peak position
Australia (ARIA)	97
Austria (Ö3 Austria Top 40)	10
Canada Alternative 30 (RPM)	2
Europe (Eurochart Hot 100)	29
Germany (GfK)	5
Iceland (Dagblaðið Vísir Top 30)	13
Switzerland (Schweizer Hitparade)	33
UK Singles Chart (OCC)	186
US Mainstream Rock Airplay (Billboard)	20

2015 weekly chart performance for "Du hast"
Chart (2015)	Peak position
US World Digital Song Sales (Billboard)	2

2022 weekly chart performance for "Du hast"
Chart (2022)	Peak position
Sweden (Sverigetopplistan)	52

2023 weekly chart performance for "Du hast"
Chart (2023)	Peak position
Finland (Suomen virallinen lista)	47
Lithuania (AGATA)	19

=== Monthly charts ===
Monthly chart performance for "Du hast"
Chart (2025)	Peak position
Russia Streaming (TopHit)	99

=== Year-end charts ===
Year-end chart performance for "Du hast"
Chart (1997)	Position
Germany (Media Control)	73

== Certifications ==
Region	Certification	Certified units/sales
Denmark (IFPI Danmark)	Platinum	90,000^{‡}
Germany (BVMI)	Platinum	600,000^{‡}
New Zealand (RMNZ)	2× Platinum	60,000^{‡}
Spain (Promusicae)	Gold	30,000^{‡}
United Kingdom (BPI)	Gold	400,000^{‡}
^{‡} Sales+streaming figures based on certification alone.

== Covers ==
- In 2014, American metalcore band Motionless in White covered the song for the compilation Punk Goes 90s Vol. 2.
- In 2015, Russian klezmer band Dobranotch covered the song with the lyrics translated into Yiddish.
- In 2023, French neofolk band SKÁLD covered the song for their album Huldufólk.
