= Oliver Riedel =

German bassist (born 1971)

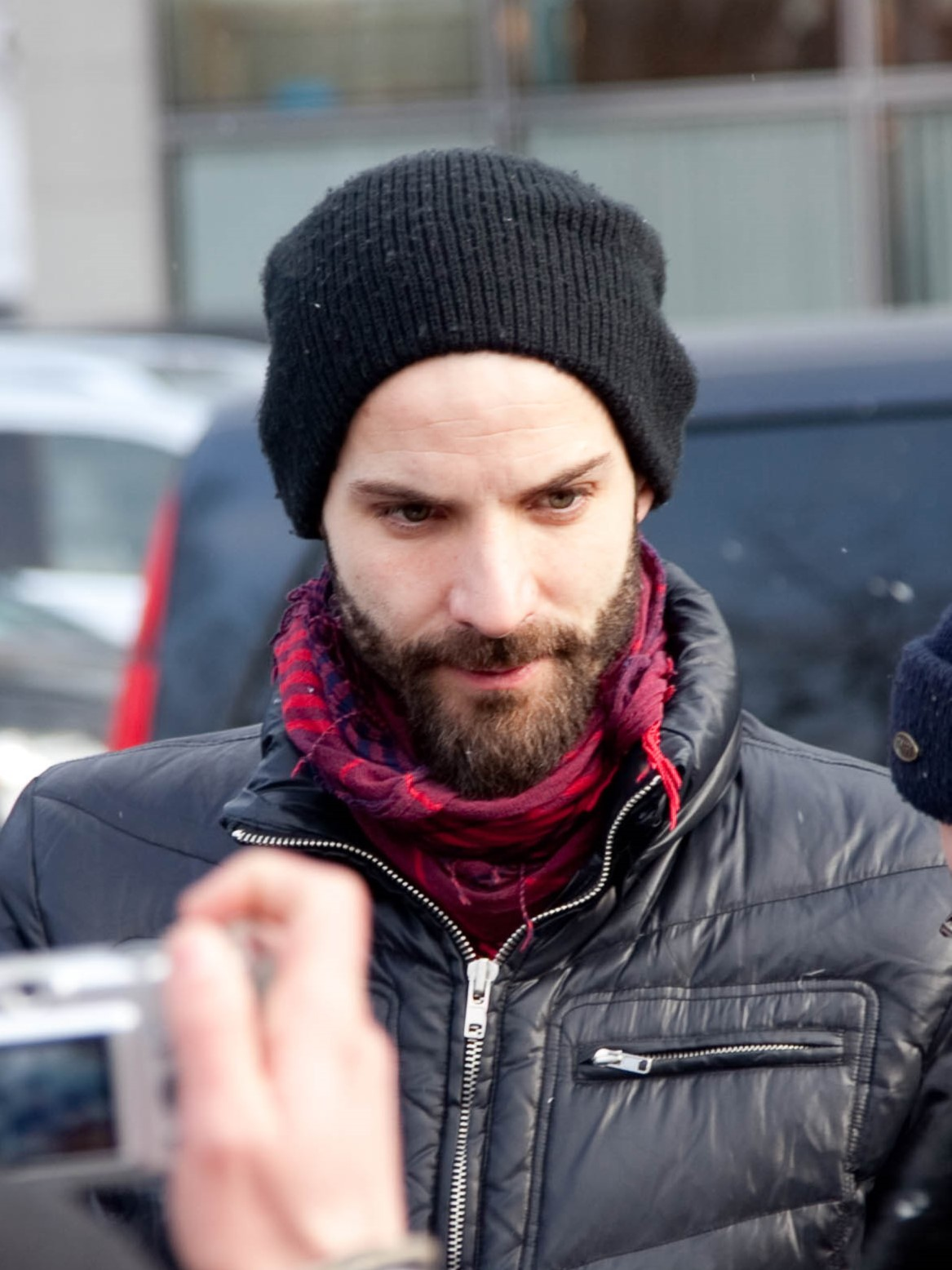
- Riedel in 2010

Background information
- Born: 11 April 1971 (age 55); Schwerin, East Germany
- Genres: Neue Deutsche Härte, folk punk
- Occupation: Musician
- Instrument: Bass guitar
- Years active: 1990–present
- Member of: Rammstein
- Formerly of: The Inchtabokatables

Oliver "Ollie" Riedel (German pronunciation: [ˈɔlɪvɐ ˈʁiːdl̩]; born 11 April 1971) is a German musician, best known as one of the founders and the bassist of Neue Deutsche Härte band Rammstein.

== Early life ==
He was born in Schwerin on 11 April 1971. Growing up, he had relatively good relationships with both of his parents, which he attributes to the small gap between their ages. As a child, he was not a good student, but he made his way through school with the assistance of his mother. Riedel was quite shy, especially during his teenage years; while his friends partied, he would often be found just "hanging around".

== Career ==
In 1992, Riedel began playing in a folk/punk band called the Inchtabokatables. That same year, he traveled to the southwest of the United States together with Richard Kruspe and Till Lindemann. In 1993, Riedel co-founded a new project named Tempelprayers with Kruspe and Christoph Schneider. Together with Lindemann, they entered the Berlin Senate Metrobeat contest in 1994 and won a recording session in a professional studio. Paul Landers and Christian "Flake" Lorenz would later join the band, which was then renamed to Rammstein.

== Personal life ==
Riedel has two children. He enjoys photography and sports, especially skateboarding and surfing. He is the tallest member of Rammstein, standing at 6 ft 7 in (2 m). Riedel is known to live a private life and rarely gives interviews. He is said to be the most computer-literate member of Rammstein. In 2022, Riedel auctioned off two of his signature Sandberg basses as part of the Gear For Hope music auction where proceeds were donated to aid organizations in Ukraine.

== Musicianship ==
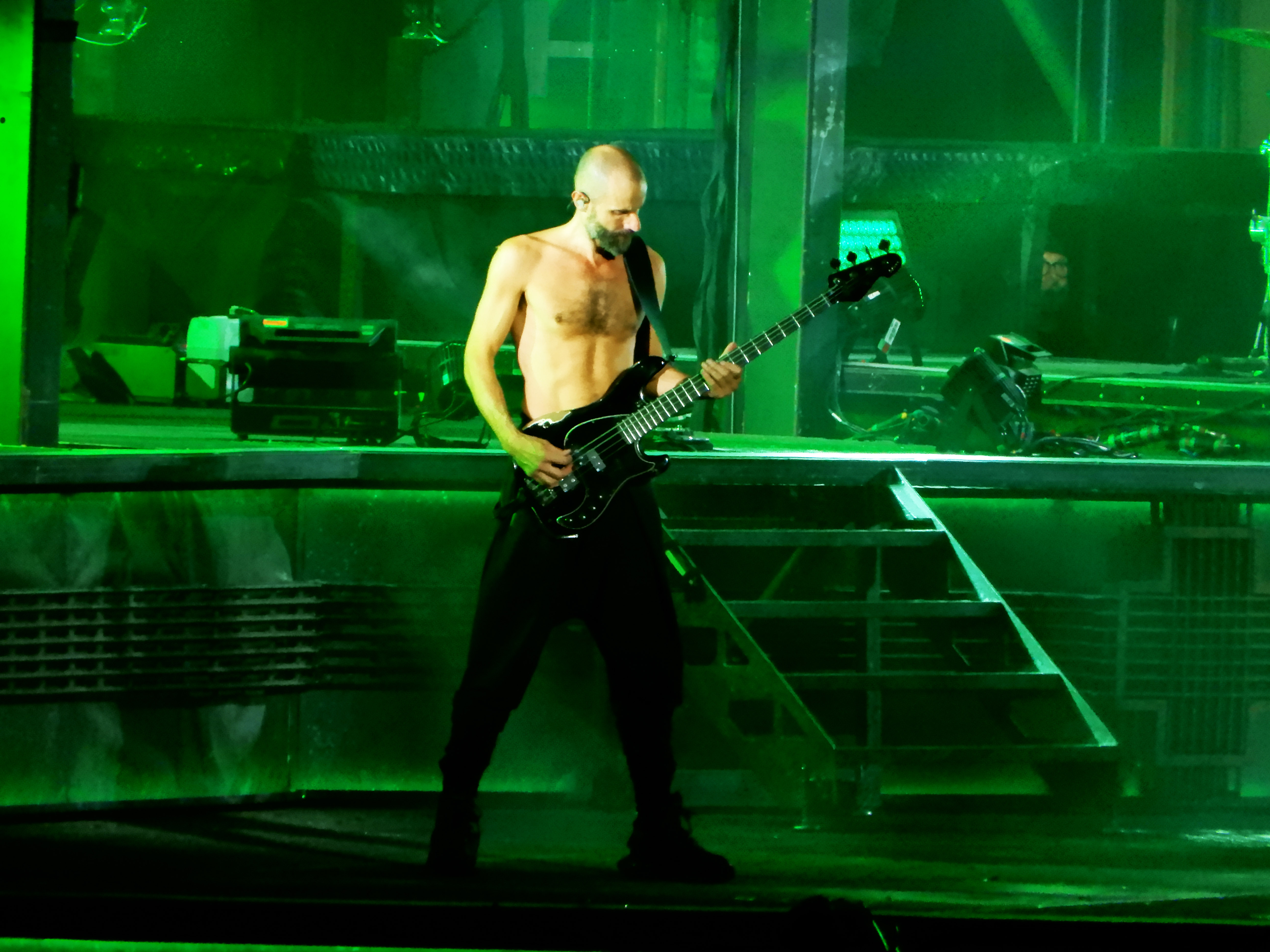
Riedel performing in 2022

=== Technique ===
Riedel is primarily a fingerstyle player, although he uses a pick for most songs when playing live.

In certain softer songs, Riedel has been known to play with a banjo style plucking technique with his right hand to play arpeggiated chords, such as in "Seemann". He also plays the acoustic guitar introduction to "Tier" and "Frühling in Paris" during live shows.

=== Gear ===
His known gear is:

- Sandberg California PM
- Sandberg Terrabass signature model
- MusicMan Stingray (used during the early days of the band)
- ESP Eclipse bass (used during the Sehnsucht tour)
- Sandberg Plasmabass 4-string custom built model
- Tech 21 SansAmp Bass Driver DI
- Glockenklang Heart-Rock Amp (Later rig)
- Ampeg SVT-II (Early rig)
- Ampeg 8x10 Cabs

Riedel also uses selected overdrive/fuzz pedals for songs such as "Mein Teil" and "Rosenrot".

== Discography ==
Rammstein

- Herzeleid (1995)
- Sehnsucht (1997)
- Mutter (2001)
- Reise, Reise (2004)
- Rosenrot (2005)
- Liebe ist für alle da (2009)
- Rammstein (2019)
- Zeit (2022)
