= Christoph Schneider =

German drummer (born 1966)

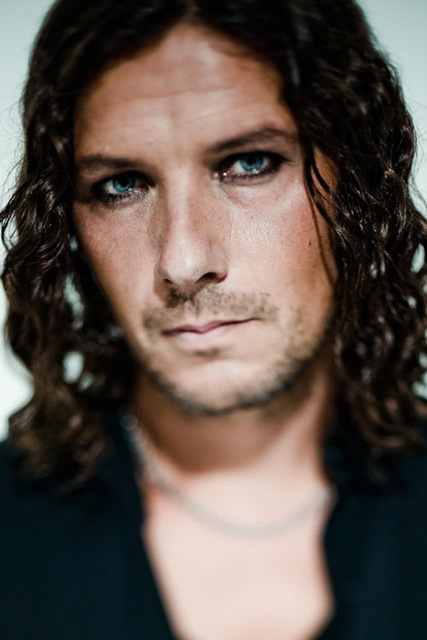
- Schneider in 2010

Background information
- Also known as: Doom
- Born: 11 May 1966 (age 60); Pankow, East Berlin, East Germany
- Genres: Neue Deutsche Härte; industrial metal; punk rock (early)
- Occupation: Drummer
- Years active: 1990–present
- Member of: Rammstein
- Formerly of: Keine Ahnung; Frechheit; Die Firma; Feeling B

Christoph Schneider (German pronunciation: [ˈkʁɪstɔf ˈʃnaɪdɐ]; born 11 May 1966) is a German drummer and one of the founding members of the Neue Deutsche Härte band Rammstein. He has released eight studio albums and three live albums with the band. He was previously a member of punk bands Die Firma and Feeling B.

== Early life ==
Schneider was born in Pankow, East Berlin. His parents were both involved in music, his father as an opera director and his mother as a music teacher. Schneider also has a younger sister. During his youth, he was a handball goalkeeper for four years. He later attended a special music school connected to a Pioneers' orchestra, as his parents wanted him to learn an instrument. He was offered the choice between trumpet, clarinet, and trombone, out of which he chose the trumpet first as it was the easiest to play. Schneider described himself as a very talented trumpeter, having joined the orchestra and started playing concerts after a year. During his time in the orchestra, he became interested in playing the drums due to the size and equipment of the drum section and began building his own kit with tin cans and buckets. His parents were initially hesitant to the idea of him playing the drums, but after he bought his first drumkit at age 14, his parents let him rehearse and take lessons.

Schneider left extended secondary school at age 16 and went on to work as a radio and telecommunications technician. In 1984, he served his national service with the East German Army. He is the only member of Rammstein to have served in the military.

== Career ==
In 1985, Schneider quit his telecommunication job to pursue his musical ambitions and study music, but failed his admission test and was rejected due to lacking other musical skills than drumming. Schneider then joined bands Keine Ahnung and Frechheit. In the late 1980s, he joined Die Firma, an underground new wave punk band with gothic influences, and became a member of punk band Feeling B in 1990.

In 1993, Schneider joined Richard Kruspe and Oliver Riedel in forming a new project called Tempelprayers. After Till Lindemann joined the band, they entered the Berlin Senate Metrobeat contest and won a recording session in a professional studio in 1994. That same year, Schneider's former Feeling B bandmates Paul Landers and Christian Lorenz joined the band, which was then renamed to Rammstein.

== Personal life ==
Schneider's nickname "Doom" comes from the video game of the same name. Schneider needed a name for the German copyright agency, but discovered that there were too many Christoph Schneiders already registered. Paul Landers suggested the name "Doom" because they liked the game. In a 2010 interview, Schneider said that if he had known that the name would appear on every record he played on, he would have chosen a different one.

Schneider has been married twice. He was married to Regina Gizatulina from 2005 to 2009. He married his second wife, Ulrike Schmid, in 2014. Schneider and Schmid have three children.

His favorite rock bands are Deep Purple, Led Zeppelin, Motörhead, Black Sabbath, and AC/DC. He cites Ian Paice, Phil Rudd, Vinnie Paul, and Chad Smith as his main drumming influences.

Schneider is a supporter of football club Union Berlin.

== Equipment ==
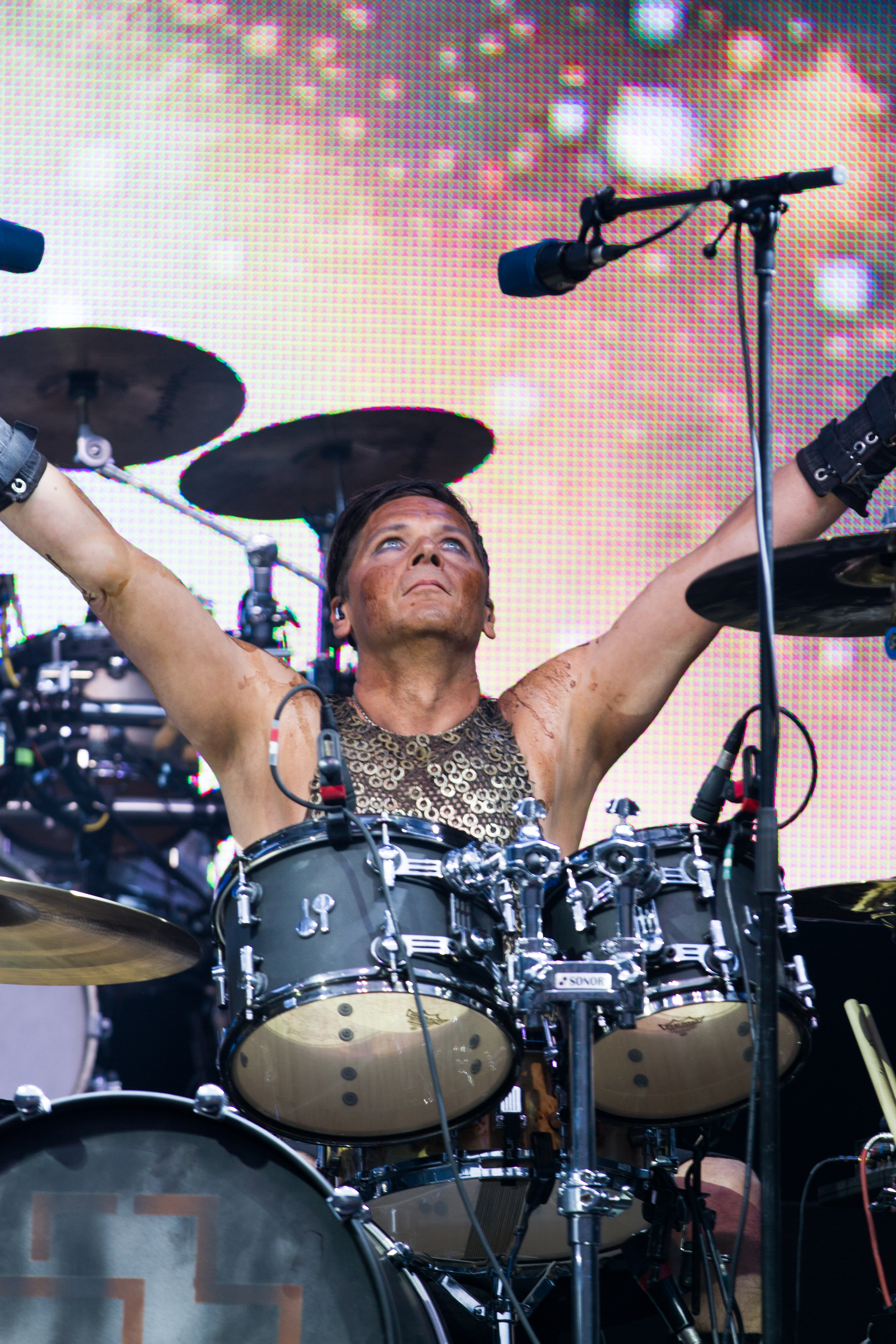
Schneider performing with Rammstein in 2015

Schneider uses and endorses Sabian cymbals, DW drum kits, pedals and hardware, Vic Firth drumsticks, and Remo Drumheads. He previously used and endorsed Sonor Drums, Tama Drums and Meinl cymbals.

=== Current DW touring kit ===
- Drums – DW Collector's Series Jazz, Maple/Gum shells, Matte Black Finish
  - 24x18 Bass Drum (x2)
  - 13x10 Tom
  - 16x16 Floor Tom
  - 18x16 Floor Tom
  - 21x16 Gong Drum
  - 12x5 Collector's Maple Snare Drum
  - 14x6 Collector's Edge Snare Drum
- Cymbals – Sabian
  - 15" HHX Groove Hats (main)
  - 15" Artisan Hats (auxiliary)
  - 22" AAX Heavy Ride
  - 20" AAX Medium Crash
  - 20" AAX X-Plosion Crash
  - 20" HHX X-Plosion Crash
  - 19" AAX X-Plosion Fast Crash
  - 21" AA Holy China
  - 12" AAX Aero Splash over 12" AA Mini Holy China stack
- Hardware – DW
- Other
  - Vic Firth SCS Christoph Schneider Signature Drumsticks
  - Remo Drumheads

Snare: Controlled sound X / Ambassador Snare Side, Toms:Clear Pinstripe / Clear Diplomat, Bass: Clear Powerstroke P3 / Powerstroke P3 Ebony

== Discography ==
Rammstein

- Herzeleid (1995)
- Sehnsucht (1997)
- Mutter (2001)
- Reise, Reise (2004)
- Rosenrot (2005)
- Liebe ist für alle da (2009)
- Untitled album (2019)
- Zeit (2022)

Feeling B

- Die Maske Des Roten Todes (1993)

Quartered Shadows

- The Last Floor Beach (1993)
