= Rammstein Stadium Tour =

2019–24 concert tour by Rammstein

- Tour by Rammstein
- Associated album: Untitled and Zeit
- Start date: 26 May 2019
- End date: 31 July 2024
- Legs: 5
- No. of shows: 141
- Attendance: 6,881,271
- Box office: $712,232,210

Rammstein concert chronology
- Festival Tour (2017); Rammstein Stadium Tour (2019–2024)

The Rammstein Stadium Tour was the seventh concert tour by German Neue Deutsche Härte band Rammstein, originally in support of their 2019 untitled studio album, but then Zeit as well in 2022 and onwards. It grossed more than $64,000,000 by the end of 2018 in pre-sales.

The tour began on May 27, 2019 in Germany with 31 European concerts. The next leg was disrupted by the COVID-19 pandemic, delaying dates for two years. It resumed from 2022 to 2024, completing 141 shows across Europe and North America. Selling over six million tickets, it became their most successful tour, grossing $563,046,342.

== Background ==
=== Announcement ===
On 2 November 2018, Rammstein announced that they would tour again, in stadiums. In the following days a few teasers were uploaded to the band's social media channels containing studio snippets from the yet unreleased song "Ramm4", that the band played on their tours in 2016–17.

The presale tickets were available from 5 November 2018 and were available to the public from 7 November 2018. Most of the venues sold out within days. And in the following days the band added a few other shows to sold-out events, mostly to the following day. On 10 April 2019, a limited number of tickets were available in some venues, due to the new single, "Deutschland", getting released.

On 24 June 2019, Rammstein added a teaser – including names of cities – on their social media pages which revealed that they would continue the European stadium tour in 2020. On 26 June, the band added another teaser, this time revealing Europe dates and venues, as well as mentioning that a US tour. Ticket sales started on 5 July. Rammstein released a teaser image for what was planned to be their next UK performance of 2020 on 26 July 2019 using a photo of what looked like a Welsh Rugby Union jersey with a Rammstein logo, draped over some stadium seating. Fans speculated that this was the Principality Stadium in Cardiff. It was then confirmed by the band when they made the official announcement that they would be playing the Cardiff stadium on 14 June 2020. This would have been their first show in Wales since July 2005. As per a 2020 announcement, the shows planned for 2020 would not take place due to the 2019–20 coronavirus outbreak, but were preliminarily postponed into 2021, and then postponed again into 2022. On May 12, 2021 the band announced four additional shows, as well as postponing the American dates to 2022 on 24 May 2021. At the last concert in Ostend in Belgium (2022), the band announced that they would be going on a European stadium tour in 2023. Concerts have been announced in Lithuania, Finland, Denmark, Germany, Slovakia, Switzerland, Spain, Portugal, Italy, the Netherlands, Hungary, France, Austria, Poland and Belgium. More than one million tickets were sold in the first few hours after the pre-sale. Further additional concerts were sold out within a very short time.

=== Allegations ===
On May 25, 2023, the Irish woman Shelby Lynn made allegations of sexual assault against Lindemann. On June 3, Rammstein released a statement on the allegations. "The allegations have hit us all very hard and we take them extremely seriously," the band wrote on Instagram. At the same time, Rammstein, just like those who made the allegations, "had a right - to not be prejudged either". The Berlin law firm Schertz Bergmann, which is representing Lindemann, is called on Shelby Lynn to stop publishing the "untrue" accusations and allegations against Lindemann. Lynn, on the other hand, continued, but again underlined that she was not raped. The famous Influencer Kayla Shyx uploaded a YouTube video in which she described in detail how the "Row Zero" system worked. Mostly female Rammstein fans were allowed to sit in the front row at Rammstein concerts. Shyx is also reporting on Rammstein's "casting director" and tour manager for the first time. She is said to have recruited these fans for Lindemann. On June 14, 2023, the Berlin public prosecutor's office initiated investigations against Lindemann for allegations "in the area of sexual offenses and the distribution of narcotics", according to the authorities. These investigations were later dropped due to a lack of evidence and a lack of sufficient suspicion. The Vilnius public prosecutor's office, declared that it would not initiate an investigation against Lindemann.

=== 2024 and end of tour ===
Due to the allegations against the band's singer, it was unclear whether the band would go on tour again in 2024. After the end of the 2023 tour, which was particularly marked by the accusations surrounding Lindemann, Rammstein announced another tour for 2024. The band quickly put a stop to rumors of a possible end to the band. Concerts have been announced in the Czech Republic, Germany, Serbia, Greece, Spain, France, Belgium, the Netherlands, Denmark, Ireland, Italy and Austria. Of the 30 concerts, 12 took place in Germany alone. Four in Dresden, three in Frankfurt and a series of five concerts in Gelsenkirchen.

During the concert series in Gelsenkirchen, Rammstein guitarist Paul Landers said at a meeting with fans that the band want to take two years off after the end of the tour. During the time off, Landers talked about releasing the song "Ramm4". The song served as the opener for this year's tour and was already played live by the band at concerts in 2016, but never released as a studio version. Additionally, the concert film from the tour will be released in the interim. After the final show on July 31, 2024 in Gelsenkirchen, the band confirmed that the tour had come to an end after 135 concerts in five years.

== Development ==
The 2019 set list of the tour saw notable performances, with "Heirate mich" and "Rammstein" being performed for the first time in 18 and 14 years, respectively. Additionally, regularly played staple songs "Keine Lust" and "Feuer frei!" were excluded from the set list for the first time. The 2022 set list features new pieces from Zeit in place of "Was ich liebe", "Tattoo", "Sex", "Diamant" and "Ohne dich" respectively, as well as ending with "Adieu" as opposed to "Ich will". 2023 saw them opening with "Rammlied" for the first time in 13 years and including "Bestrafe Mich" for the first time in well over 20 years.

== Set list ==
=== 2019 ===
1. "Music for the Royal Fireworks" (intro)
2. "Was ich liebe"
3. "Links 2 3 4"
4. "Tattoo"
5. "Sehnsucht"
6. "Zeig dich"
7. "Mein Herz brennt"
8. "Puppe"
9. "Heirate mich"
10. "Diamant"
11. "Deutschland" (Richard Z. Kruspe Remix) (interlude)
12. "Deutschland"
13. "Radio"
14. "Mein Teil"
15. "Du hast"
16. "Sonne"
17. "Ohne dich"

First Encore

19. "Engel" (with Duo Jatekok)
20. "Ausländer"
21. "Du riechst so gut"
22. "Pussy"

Second Encore

23. "Rammstein"
24. "Ich will"
25. "Sonne (Piano Version)" / "Haifisch (Haiswing RMX)" (outro)

=== 2022 ===
1. "Music for the Royal Fireworks" (intro)
2. "Armee der Tristen"
3. "Zick Zack"
4. "Links 2 3 4"
5. "Sehnsucht"
6. "Zeig dich"
7. "Mein Herz brennt"
8. "Puppe"
9. "Heirate mich"
10. "Zeit"
11. "Deutschland" (Richard Z. Kruspe Remix) (interlude)
12. "Deutschland"
13. "Radio"
14. "Mein Teil"
15. "Du hast"
16. "Sonne"

First Encore

17. "Engel" (with Duo Jatekok)
18. "Ausländer"
19. "Du riechst so gut"
20. "Pussy"

Second Encore

21. "Rammstein"
22. "Ich will"
23. "Adieu"
24. "Sonne (Piano Version)" / "Haifisch (Haiswing RMX)" / "Ohne dich (Piano Version) (outro)

=== 2023 ===
1. "Music for the Royal Fireworks" (intro)
2. "Rammlied"
3. "Links 2 3 4"
4. "Bestrafe Mich"
5. "Giftig"
6. "Sehnsucht"
7. "Mein Herz brennt"
8. "Puppe"
9. "Angst"
10. "Zeit"
11. "Deutschland" (Richard Z. Kruspe Remix) (interlude)
12. "Deutschland"
13. "Radio"
14. "Mein Teil"
15. "Du hast"
16. "Sonne"

First Encore

17. "Ohne Dich" (with Duo Abélard)
18. "Engel" (with Duo Abélard)
19. "Ausländer"
20. "Du riechst so gut"
21. "Pussy"

Second Encore

22. "Rammstein"
23. "Ich will"
24. "Adieu"
25. "Sonne (Piano Version)" / "Haifisch (Haiswing RMX)" / "Lügen" (Piano Version) (outro)

=== 2024 ===
1. "Music for the Royal Fireworks" (intro)
2. "Ramm4"
3. "Links 2 3 4"
4. "Keine Lust"
5. "Sehnsucht"
6. "Asche zu Asche"
7. "Mein Herz brennt"
8. "Puppe"
9. "Wiener Blut"
10. "Zeit"
11. "Deutschland" (Richard Z. Kruspe Remix) (interlude)
12. "Deutschland"
13. "Radio"
14. "Mein Teil"
15. "Du hast"
16. "Sonne"

First Encore

18. "Engel" (with Duo Abélard)
19. "Ausländer"
20. "Du riechst so gut"
21. "Pussy"
22. "Ich will"

Second Encore

22. "Rammstein"
23. "Adieu"
24. "Sonne (Piano Version)" / "Haifisch (Haiswing RMX)" / "Lügen" (Piano Version) (outro)

=== Notes ===
- The song "Pussy" was removed from the set list after the Odense shows due to the allegations against Till Lindemann.
- The Song "Sex" was removed from the set list after the show in Barcelona in 2019.
- During the shows in Mexico City in 2022, the band played a special encore with their song "Te quiero puta!".

== Concert synopsis for 2019 and 2022 ==
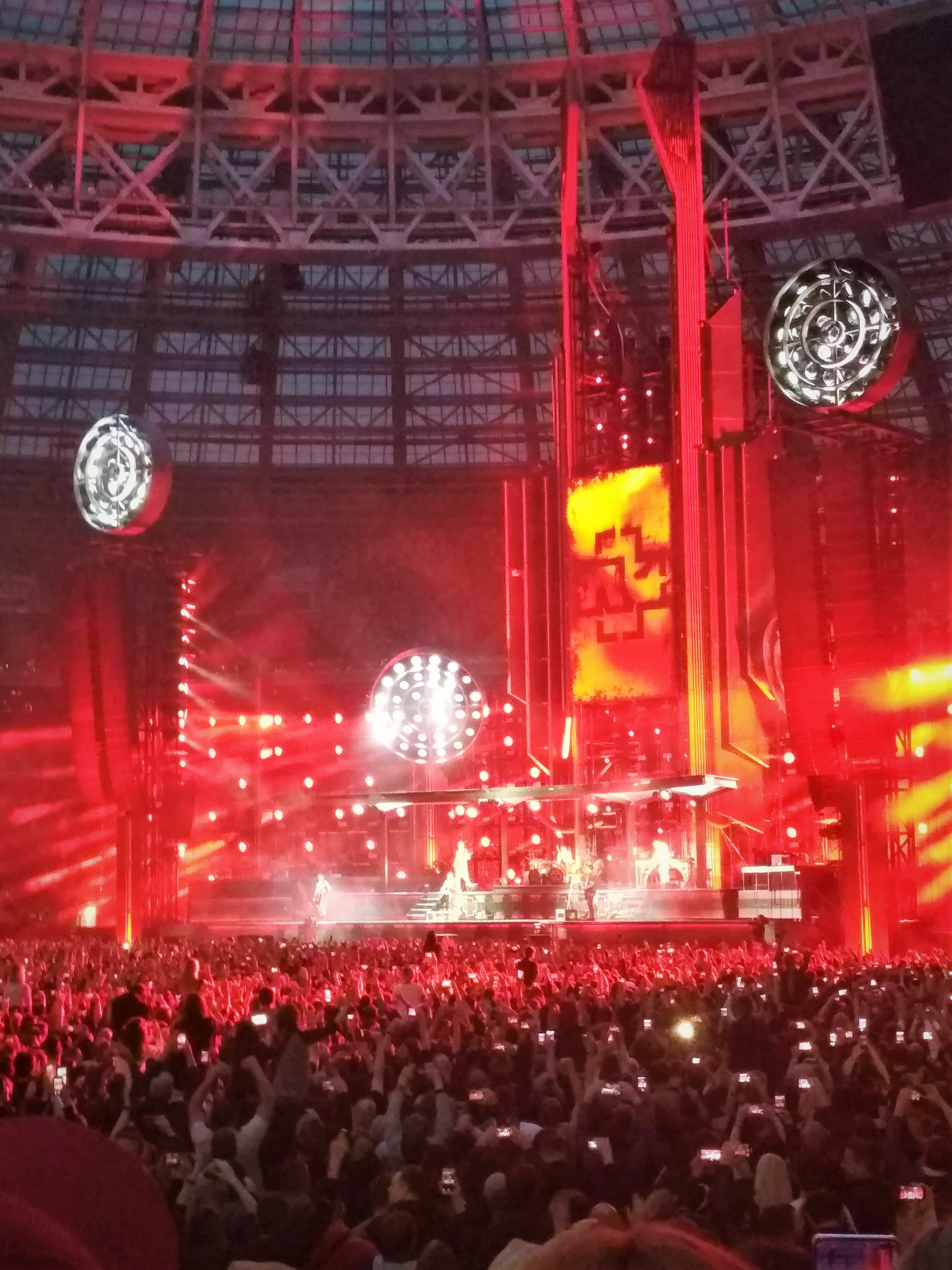
Rammstein performing in July 2019

The show begins with "Music for the Royal Fireworks" played over the speakers, as a screen rises up above the stage. As the music builds to a crescendo, Rammstein's stylised R logo flashes onto the screen, as Christoph walks on stage to his drums, and there is an explosion of pyrotechnics. The rest of the band then emerges from the bottom of the stage, Richard first, then Paul, followed by Ollie and Flake, and finally Till, clad in a snakeskin military uniform, complete with jacket and boots. They then launch straight into "Was Ich liebe", during which black smoke is rising from the stage and delay towers. Next up, Till discards his jacket, and the band continues with "Links 2-3-4". Red banners with the Rammstein logo are revealed across the stage when the song kicks in. As the band start playing "Tattoo", Till then takes off his shirt, revealing a vest top underneath. After "Sehnsucht" and "Zeig Dich", Till begins singing "Mein Herz Brennt", but tricks the audience into singing the hook at the wrong time, before the band starts playing the hook properly. As the band starts playing "Puppe", Till then goes under the stage, and comes back pushing an enormous metal pram. He then puts on a camera that goes over his eye, and looks inside the pram, to reveal a deformed baby doll with its mouth stuck in a scream. During the chorus, flames erupt from the pram, and black confetti falls down on the audience. The pram is then moved off stage, and the band continues with "Heirate mich" and "Diamant". Afterwards, the band leaves the stage, as Richard ascends the stage on a mechanised platform, and starts playing his remix of "Deutschland" on a DJ deck. After a few minutes, Paul, Christoph, Ollie and Flake walk on stage wearing identical hooded suits, which light up as they put their hoods up, and dance around the stage. Afterwards the platform descends, the band come back in their normal clothes, and play the regular version of "Deutschland". After an energetic performance of "Radio", Till and Flake disappear offstage. As the rest of the band start playing "Mein Teil", Till comes back in a bloodied chef's outfit, wheeling a huge cooking pot. He then lifts the lid to reveal Flake inside, playing his keyboard. Till then starts singing into a microphone with a knife attached to the end. After the second chorus, he then brings out a variety of flamethrowers, and roasts the bottom of the pot. Finally, Flake escapes the pot, and Till chases him off the stage. They then return to the stage for "Du hast". Midway through the bridge of the song, a roadie brings out a crossbow, as Till picks it up, aims and fires, sending fireworks shooting above the audience, causing a series of explosions. They then stop, and start playing "Sonne", which is accompanied by twenty-foot theatrical flames, around the audience. They then finish the set with "Ohne dich", during which sparks rain down over Till. They then leave the stage, as a graphic on the screen shows a smartphone turning on the flashlight, encouraging the audience to do the same.

The band then appears on a small stage in the middle of the stadium, with their opening act Duo Jatekok, and play a piano version of "Engel". Flake, Schneider, Paul, Oliver and Richard return to the main stage via inflatable rubber life rafts where they are greeted by Till, at which point they delve into their first encore and play "Ausländer". Next is "Du riechst so gut", where Till shoots a bow shooting sparks. They finish the first encore with "Pussy", where midway through the song, Till mounts a phallic cannon that shoots white foam on the audience. After getting off the cannon, confetti starts shooting out over the audience. The band then leaves the stage.

After a long pause, the band come back onto the stage for their second encore, and start playing "Rammstein". They finish with "Ich will" (Adieu in 2022 and 2023), during which, huge bursts of flame shoot up into the sky from the very top of the stage. The band then stops playing, and they don a curtsey (as is customary for them) at the bottom of the stage, before Till stands up and thanks the audience for their support, and the band finally leave the stage by way of a lift. The show ends how it began, with another explosion.

== Tour dates ==
List of 2019 concerts, showing date, city, country, venue, tickets sold, number of available tickets and gross revenue
Date	City	Country	Venue	Attendance	Revenue
24 May 2019 (Note: These performances were open rehearsals for official fanclub (LIFAD) members of the band.)	Gelsenkirchen	Germany	Veltins-Arena	—	—
26 May 2019	Gelsenkirchen	Germany	Veltins-Arena	—	—
27 May 2019	Gelsenkirchen	Germany	Veltins-Arena	104,816 / 104,816	$11,606,919
28 May 2019	Gelsenkirchen	Germany	Veltins-Arena	104,816 / 104,816	$11,606,919
1 June 2019	Cornellà de Llobregat	Spain	RCDE Stadium	33,825 / 33,825	$3,211,067
5 June 2019	Bern	Switzerland	Stade de Suisse	41,324 / 41,324	$3,761,075
8 June 2019	Munich	Germany	Olympiastadion	121,250 / 121,250	$13,607,156
9 June 2019	Munich	Germany	Olympiastadion	121,250 / 121,250	$13,607,156
12 June 2019	Dresden	Germany	Rudolf-Harbig-Stadion	49,133 / 49,133	$5,491,968
13 June 2019	Dresden	Germany	Rudolf-Harbig-Stadion	49,133 / 49,133	$5,491,968
16 June 2019	Rostock	Germany	Ostseestadion	30,660 / 30,660	$3,405,101
19 June 2019	Copenhagen	Denmark	Telia Parken	44,396 / 44,396	$4,774,338
22 June 2019	Berlin	Germany	Olympiastadion	72,367 / 72,367	$7,823,126
25 June 2019	Rotterdam	Netherlands	De Kuip	44,782 / 44,782	$3,548,054
28 June 2019	Nanterre	France	Paris La Défense Arena	73,223 / 73,223	$6,660,269
29 June 2019	Nanterre	France	Paris La Défense Arena	73,223 / 73,223	$6,660,269
2 July 2019	Hanover	Germany	HDI Arena	44,224 / 44,224	$4,944,729
6 July 2019	Milton Keynes	England	Stadium MK	31,721 / 31,721	$3,499,117
10 July 2019	Brussels	Belgium	King Baudouin Stadium	43,204 / 43,204	$3,934,182
13 July 2019	Frankfurt	Germany	Commerzbank-Arena	40,976 / 40,976	$4,613,467
16 July 2019	Prague	Czech Republic	Eden Aréna	62,446 / 64,946	$5,334,997
17 July 2019	Prague	Czech Republic	Eden Aréna	62,446 / 64,946	$5,334,997
20 July 2019	Roeser	Luxembourg	Roeser Festival Grounds	18,000 / 18,000	$1,615,455
24 July 2019	Chorzów	Poland	Stadion Śląski	53,309 / 53,309	$5,083,822
29 July 2019 (Note: This concert was moved from the VTB Arena to increase capacity due to high ticket demand.)	Moscow	Russia	Luzhniki Stadium	60,626 / 60,626	$6,691,854
2 August 2019	Saint Petersburg	Russia	Gazprom Arena	55,411 / 55,411	$6,150,852
6 August 2019	Riga	Latvia	Lucavsala	40,000 / 40,000	$3,584,751
9 August 2019	Tampere	Finland	Ratina Stadion	61,801 / 61,801	$6,376,021
10 August 2019	Tampere	Finland	Ratina Stadion	61,801 / 61,801	$6,376,021
14 August 2019	Stockholm	Sweden	Stockholm Stadion	31,432 / 31,432	$2,658,411
18 August 2019	Oslo	Norway	Ullevaal Stadion	30,250 / 30,250	$2,728,104
22 August 2019	Vienna	Austria	Ernst-Happel-Stadion	104,000 / 104,000	$10,154,465
23 August 2019	Vienna	Austria	Ernst-Happel-Stadion	104,000 / 104,000	$10,154,465

List of 2022 concerts, showing date, city, country, venue, tickets sold, number of available tickets and gross revenue
Date	City	Country	Venue	Attendance	Revenue
11 May 2022	Prague	Czech Republic	Letnany Airport	—	—
13 May 2022	Prague	Czech Republic	Letnany Airport	—	—
15 May 2022	Prague	Czech Republic	Letnany Airport	116,013 / 119,996	$8,289,861
16 May 2022	Prague	Czech Republic	Letnany Airport	116,013 / 119,996	$8,289,861
20 May 2022	Leipzig	Germany	Red Bull Arena	92,442 / 92,442	$10,111,598
21 May 2022	Leipzig	Germany	Red Bull Arena	92,442 / 92,442	$10,111,598
25 May 2022	Klagenfurt	Austria	Wörthersee Stadion	67,366 / 69,428	$6,272,580
26 May 2022	Klagenfurt	Austria	Wörthersee Stadion	67,366 / 69,428	$6,272,580
30 May 2022	Zürich	Switzerland	Stadion Letzigrund	93,061 / 93,061	$13,813,525
31 May 2022	Zürich	Switzerland	Stadion Letzigrund	93,061 / 93,061	$13,813,525
4 June 2022	Berlin	Germany	Olympiastadion	142,462 / 142,462	$16,886,656
5 June 2022	Berlin	Germany	Olympiastadion	142,462 / 142,462	$16,886,656
10 June 2022	Stuttgart	Germany	Cannstatter Wasen	99,683 / 99,683	$11,260,301
11 June 2022	Stuttgart	Germany	Cannstatter Wasen	99,683 / 99,683	$11,260,301
14 June 2022	Hamburg	Germany	Volksparkstadion	86,908 / 86,908	$10,027,033
15 June 2022	Hamburg	Germany	Volksparkstadion	86,908 / 86,908	$10,027,033
18 June 2022	Düsseldorf	Germany	Merkur Spiel-Arena	90,772 / 90,772	$10,338,393
19 June 2022	Düsseldorf	Germany	Merkur Spiel-Arena	90,772 / 90,772	$10,338,393
22 June 2022	Aarhus	Denmark	Ceres Park	38,883 / 38,883	$4,407,217
26 June 2022	Coventry	England	Coventry Building Society Arena	34,366 / 34,999	$3,184,549
30 June 2022	Cardiff	Wales	Principality Stadium	53,993 / 60,005	$4,957,133
4 July 2022	Nijmegen	Netherlands	Goffertpark	129,290 / 130,290	$11,060,290
5 July 2022	Nijmegen	Netherlands	Goffertpark	129,290 / 130,290	$11,060,290
8 July 2022	Décines-Charpieu	France	Groupama Stadium	97,762 / 99,503	$8,423,239
9 July 2022	Décines-Charpieu	France	Groupama Stadium	97,762 / 99,503	$8,423,239
12 July 2022	Turin	Italy	Stadio Olimpico Grande Torino	36,373 / 36,373	$3,220,945
16 July 2022	Warsaw	Poland	PGE Narodowy	52,669 / 52,669	$4,303,567
20 July 2022	Tallinn	Estonia	Song Festival Grounds	60,021 / 60,021	$4,084,395
24 July 2022	Oslo	Norway	Bjerke Travbane	60,000 / 60,000	$6,096,542
28 July 2022	Gothenburg	Sweden	Ullevi Stadium	161,702 / 188,811	$18,883,126
29 July 2022	Gothenburg	Sweden	Ullevi Stadium	161,702 / 188,811	$18,883,126
30 July 2022	Gothenburg	Sweden	Ullevi Stadium	161,702 / 188,811	$18,883,126
3 August 2022	Ostend	Belgium	Park De Nieuwe Koers	93,676 / 93,676	$7,971,868
4 August 2022	Ostend	Belgium	Park De Nieuwe Koers	93,676 / 93,676	$7,971,868
21 August 2022	Montreal	Canada	Parc Jean-Drapeau	42,242 / 50,000	$3,698,509
27 August 2022	Minneapolis	United States	U.S. Bank Stadium	36,078 / 36,385	$6,909,298
31 August 2022	Philadelphia	United States	Lincoln Financial Field	51,115 / 51,115	$9,789,034
3 September 2022	Chicago	United States	Soldier Field	47,263 / 48,000	$9,051,337
6 September 2022	East Rutherford	United States	MetLife Stadium	49,287 / 49,287	$9,438,953
9 September 2022	Foxborough	United States	Gillette Stadium	36,230 / 36,230	$6,938,408
17 September 2022	San Antonio	United States	Alamodome	38,490 / 41,387	$7,371,221
23 September 2022	Los Angeles	United States	Los Angeles Memorial Coliseum	69,026 / 70,000	$13,219,171
24 September 2022	Los Angeles	United States	Los Angeles Memorial Coliseum	69,026 / 70,000	$13,219,171
1 October 2022	Mexico City	Mexico	Foro Sol	193,990 / 193,990	$12,465,446
2 October 2022	Mexico City	Mexico	Foro Sol	193,990 / 193,990	$12,465,446
4 October 2022	Mexico City	Mexico	Foro Sol	193,990 / 193,990	$12,465,446

List of 2023 concerts, showing date, city, country, venue, tickets sold, number of available tickets and gross revenue
Date	City	Country	Venue	Attendance	Revenue
20 May 2023	Vilnius	Lithuania	Vingis Park	—	—
22 May 2023	Vilnius	Lithuania	Vingis Park	33,290 / 33,290	$3,690,821
27 May 2023	Helsinki	Finland	Olympiastadion	79,349 / 79,349	$10,417,212
28 May 2023	Helsinki	Finland	Olympiastadion	79,349 / 79,349	$10,417,212
2 June 2023	Odense	Denmark	Dyrskueplads	86,277 / 86,277	$11,115,491
3 June 2023	Odense	Denmark	Dyrskueplads	86,277 / 86,277	$11,115,491
7 June 2023	Munich	Germany	Olympiastadion	266,551 / 266,551	$32,048,857
8 June 2023	Munich	Germany	Olympiastadion	266,551 / 266,551	$32,048,857
10 June 2023	Munich	Germany	Olympiastadion	266,551 / 266,551	$32,048,857
11 June 2023	Munich	Germany	Olympiastadion	266,551 / 266,551	$32,048,857
14 June 2023	Trencin	Slovakia	Trencin Airport	58,922 / 58,922	$5,630,835
17 June 2023	Bern	Switzerland	Stadion Wankdorf	74,443 / 74,443	$13,439,726
18 June 2023	Bern	Switzerland	Stadion Wankdorf	74,443 / 74,443	$13,439,726
23 June 2023	Madrid	Spain	Metropolitano Stadium	49,210 / 49,210	$5,172,111
26 June 2023	Lisbon	Portugal	Estádio da Luz	56,300 / 56,300	$5,901,383
1 July 2023	Padova	Italy	Stadio Euganeo	40,201 / 40,201	$4,958,963
6 July 2023	Groningen	Netherlands	Stadspark	108,095 / 141,608	$11,755,869
7 July 2023	Groningen	Netherlands	Stadspark	108,095 / 141,608	$11,755,869
11 July 2023	Budapest	Hungary	Puskas Arena	96,971 / 98,158	$9,127,355
12 July 2023	Budapest	Hungary	Puskas Arena	96,971 / 98,158	$9,127,355
15 July 2023	Berlin	Germany	Olympiastadion	215,973 / 215,973	$26,188,705
16 July 2023	Berlin	Germany	Olympiastadion	215,973 / 215,973	$26,188,705
18 July 2023	Berlin	Germany	Olympiastadion	215,973 / 215,973	$26,188,705
22 July 2023	Saint Denis	France	Stade de France	68,122 / 68,122	$7,235,690
26 July 2023	Vienna	Austria	Ernst-Happel-Stadion	109,264 / 109,264	$15,040,020
27 July 2023	Vienna	Austria	Ernst-Happel-Stadion	109,264 / 109,264	$15,040,020
30 July 2023	Chorzów	Poland	Stadion Śląski	117,982 / 119,839	$12,890,440
31 July 2023	Chorzów	Poland	Stadion Śląski	117,982 / 119,839	$12,890,440
3 August 2023	Brussels	Belgium	King Baudouin Stadium	138,230 / 138,230	$14,699,369
4 August 2023	Brussels	Belgium	King Baudouin Stadium	138,230 / 138,230	$14,699,369
5 August 2023	Brussels	Belgium	King Baudouin Stadium	138,230 / 138,230	$14,699,369

List of 2024 concerts, showing date, city, country, venue, tickets sold, number of available tickets and gross revenue
Date	City	Country	Venue	Attendance	Revenue
9 May 2024	Prague	Czech Republic	Letnany Airport	4,000	—
11 May 2024	Prague	Czech Republic	Letnany Airport	105,249 / 120.000	$9,227,632
12 May 2024	Prague	Czech Republic	Letnany Airport	105,249 / 120.000	$9,227,632
15 May 2024	Dresden	Germany	Rinne	237,597 / 237,597	$22,443,318
16 May 2024	Dresden	Germany	Rinne	237,597 / 237,597	$22,443,318
18 May 2024	Dresden	Germany	Rinne	237,597 / 237,597	$22,443,318
19 May 2024	Dresden	Germany	Rinne	237,597 / 237,597	$22,443,318
24 May 2024	Belgrade	Serbia	Ušće Park	92,464 / 101.286	$9,285,375
25 May 2024	Belgrade	Serbia	Ušće Park	92,464 / 101.286	$9,285,375
30 May 2024	Athens	Greece	Olympic Stadium	31,230 / 47,855	$3,217,392
5 June 2024	San Sebastian	Spain	Estadio Anoeta	34,905 / 34,905	$3,914,539
8 June 2024	Marseille	France	Orange Vélodrome	48,039 / 54,833	$5,079,372
11 June 2024	Barcelona	Spain	Estadi Olympic	50,183 / 50,183	$5,376,563
15 June 2024	Décines-Charpieu	France	Groupama Stadium	44,572 / 47,763	$4,542,574
18 June 2024	Nijmegen	Netherlands	Goffertpark	85,849 / 120,287	$9,325,494
19 June 2024	Nijmegen	Netherlands	Goffertpark	85,849 / 120,287	$9,325,494
23 June 2024	Dublin	Ireland	RDS Arena	37,116 / 37,116	$4,605,706
27 June 2024	Ostend	Belgium	Park De Nieuwe Koers	90,780 / 98.110	$9,989,242
28 June 2024	Ostend	Belgium	Park De Nieuwe Koers	90,780 / 98.110	$9,989,242
5 July 2024	Copenhagen	Denmark	Valbyparken	36,945 / 40,000	$4,438,376
11 July 2024	Frankfurt	Germany	Deutsche Bank Park	136,149 / 139,155	$14,854,902
12 July 2024	Frankfurt	Germany	Deutsche Bank Park	136,149 / 139,155	$14,854,902
13 July 2024	Frankfurt	Germany	Deutsche Bank Park	136,149 / 139,155	$14,854,902
17 July 2024	Klagenfurt	Austria	Wörthersee Stadion	63,373 / 68,452	$6,111,391
18 July 2024	Klagenfurt	Austria	Wörthersee Stadion	63,373 / 68,452	$6,111,391
21 July 2024	Reggio Emilia	Italy	RCF Arena	53,666 / 61,060	$7,133,196
26 July 2024	Gelsenkirchen	Germany	Veltins-Arena	253,674 / 253,674	$29,640,796
27 July 2024	Gelsenkirchen	Germany	Veltins-Arena	253,674 / 253,674	$29,640,796
29 July 2024	Gelsenkirchen	Germany	Veltins-Arena	253,674 / 253,674	$29,640,796
30 July 2024	Gelsenkirchen	Germany	Veltins-Arena	253,674 / 253,674	$29,640,796
31 July 2024	Gelsenkirchen	Germany	Veltins-Arena	253,674 / 253,674	$29,640,796
TOTAL				6,881,271	$712,232,210

== Cancelled shows ==
List of cancelled shows with date, city, country, venue, and reason for cancellation
Date	City	Country	Venue	Reason
27 August 2020	Landover	United States	FedExField	Scheduling issues
31 May 2021	Stuttgart	Germany	Mercedes-Benz Arena	Shows were moved to Cannstatter Wasen
1 June 2021	Stuttgart	Germany	Mercedes-Benz Arena	Shows were moved to Cannstatter Wasen
26 July 2020	Trondheim	Norway	Granåsen	COVID-19 pandemic
27 July 2020	Trondheim	Norway	Granåsen	COVID-19 pandemic
25 July 2021	Trondheim	Norway	Leangen Travbane	Show was moved to Bjerke Travbane in Oslo
12 June 2021	Belfast	Northern Ireland	Boucher Road Playing Fields	Unknown
