= List of number-one hits of 2022 (Germany) =

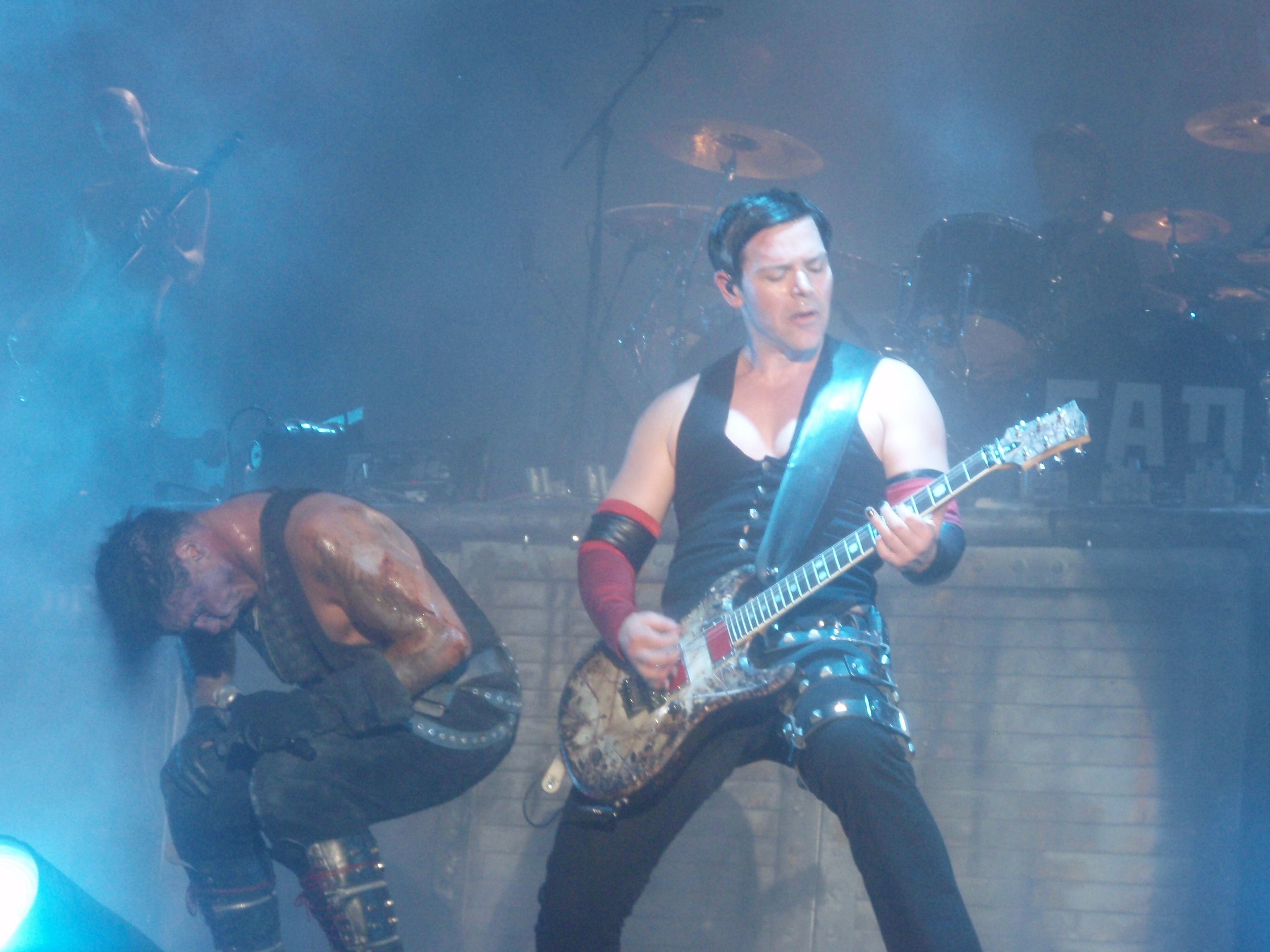
Dj Robin & Schürze's "Layla" became the best-performing single of 2022, while Rammstein's (pictured) "Zeit" became the best-performing album of the year.

The GfK Entertainment charts are record charts compiled by GfK Entertainment on behalf of the German record industry. They include the "Single Top 100" and the "Album Top 100" chart. The chart week runs from Friday to Thursday, and the chart compilations are published on Tuesday for the record industry. The entire top 100 singles and top 100 albums are officially released the following Friday by GfK Entertainment. The charts are based on sales of physical singles and albums from retail outlets as well as permanent music downloads.

== Number-one hits by week ==
Key
†	Indicates best-performing single and album of 2022

Issue date	Song	Artist	Ref.	Album	Artist	Ref.
7 January	"ABCDEFU"	Gayle		Memento Mori	Feuerschwanz	
14 January	"ABCDEFU"	Gayle		Löwenmut	Daniela Alfinito	
21 January	"Der letzte Song (Alles wird gut)"	Kummer featuring Fred Rabe		Große Freiheit	Gzuz	
28 January	"ABCDEFU"	Gayle		Crisis of Faith	Billy Talent	
4 February	"ABCDEFU"	Gayle		Was kost die Welt	Versengold	
11 February	"ABCDEFU"	Gayle		The Berlin Concert	John Williams and the Berlin Philharmonic	
18 February	"ABCDEFU"	Gayle		Pussy Power	Katja Krasavice	
25 February	"ABCDEFU"	Gayle		Rummelbums	Finch	
4 March	"ABCDEFU"	Gayle		Alles war schön und nichts tat weh	Casper	
11 March	"Sehnsucht"	Miksu, Macloud and T-Low		The War to End All Wars	Sabaton	
18 March	"Zeit"	Rammstein		Impera	Ghost	
25 March	"Sehnsucht"	Miksu, Macloud and T-Low		PolaR	Edo Saiya	
1 April	"Sehnsucht"	Miksu, Macloud and T-Low		Never Let Me Go	Placebo	
8 April	"Sehnsucht"	Miksu, Macloud and T-Low		Unlimited Love	Red Hot Chili Peppers	
15 April	"Zick Zack"	Rammstein		Mille Grazie	Roy Bianco & Die Abbrunzati Boys	
22 April	"As It Was"	Harry Styles		Emotions	Mike Singer	
29 April	"We Made It"	Miksu, Macloud and T-Low		Yellow Bar Mitzvah	Sun Diego	
6 May	"Beautiful Girl"	Luciano		Zeit †	Rammstein	
13 May	"Beautiful Girl"	Luciano		Zeit †	Rammstein	
20 May	"Beautiful Girl"	Luciano		Zeit †	Rammstein	
27 May	"Beautiful Girl"	Luciano		Harry's House	Harry Styles	
3 June	"Beautiful Girl"	Luciano		Alles aus Liebe: 40 Jahre Die Toten Hosen	Die Toten Hosen	
10 June	"Beautiful Girl"	Luciano		Ein gutes schlechtes Vorbild	SDP	
17 June	"Ohne Benzin"	Domiziana		Proof	BTS	
24 June	"Layla" †	DJ Robin & Schürze		Zeit †	Rammstein	
1 July	"Layla" †	DJ Robin & Schürze		Closure/Continuation	Porcupine Tree	
8 July	"Layla" †	DJ Robin & Schürze		Zeit †	Rammstein	
15 July	"Layla" †	DJ Robin & Schürze		The Monumental Mass – A Cinematic Metal Event	Powerwolf	
22 July	"Layla" †	DJ Robin & Schürze		Deutschrap brandneu	Farid Bang and Capital Bra	
29 July	"Layla" †	DJ Robin & Schürze		Liebe siegt	Die Amigos	
5 August	"Layla" †	DJ Robin & Schürze		Ich würd's wieder tun	Andrea Berg	
12 August	"Layla" †	DJ Robin & Schürze		The Great Heathen Army	Amon Amarth	
19 August	"Layla" †	DJ Robin & Schürze		11:11	Cro	
26 August	"Wildberry Lillet"	Nina Chuba		Per sempre	Giovanni Zarrella	
2 September	"Wildberry Lillet"	Nina Chuba		Für den Himmel durch die Hölle	Kontra K	
9 September	"Nachts wach"	Miksu/Macloud & Makko		Perspektiven	Roland Kaiser	
16 September	"Wildberry Lillet"	Nina Chuba		Palmen aus Plastik 3	Bonez MC & RAF Camora	
23 September	"Wildberry Lillet"	Nina Chuba		Tekkno	Electric Callboy	
30 September	"Bamba"	Luciano featuring Aitch and Bia		Kargo	Kraftklub	
7 October	"Gönn dir"	Twenty4tim		The End, So Far	Slipknot	
14 October	"Bamba"	Luciano featuring Aitch and Bia		Die Sehnsucht ist mein Steuermann – Das Beste aus 10 Jahren	Santiano	
21 October	"Bamba"	Luciano featuring Aitch and Bia		Return of the Dream Canteen	Red Hot Chili Peppers	
28 October	"Zukunft Pink"	Peter Fox featuring Inéz		Midnights	Taylor Swift	
4 November	"Zukunft Pink"	Peter Fox featuring Inéz		Revolver	The Beatles	
11 November	"Zukunft Pink"	Peter Fox featuring Inéz		Plan A	Johannes Oerding	
18 November	"Zukunft Pink"	Peter Fox featuring Inéz		Only the Strong Survive	Bruce Springsteen	
25 November	"Zukunft Pink"	Peter Fox featuring Inéz		Not So Silent Night	Sarah Connor	
2 December	"All I Want for Christmas Is You"	Mariah Carey		Puro Amor	Broilers	
9 December	"All I Want for Christmas Is You"	Mariah Carey		Not So Silent Night	Sarah Connor	
16 December	"All I Want for Christmas Is You"	Mariah Carey		Paul	Sido	
23 December	"All I Want for Christmas Is You"	Mariah Carey		Da capo, Udo Jürgens – Stationen einer Weltkarriere	Udo Jürgens	
30 December	"Last Christmas"	Wham!		Christmas	Michael Bublé	
