= Germania (personification) =

National personification of Germany

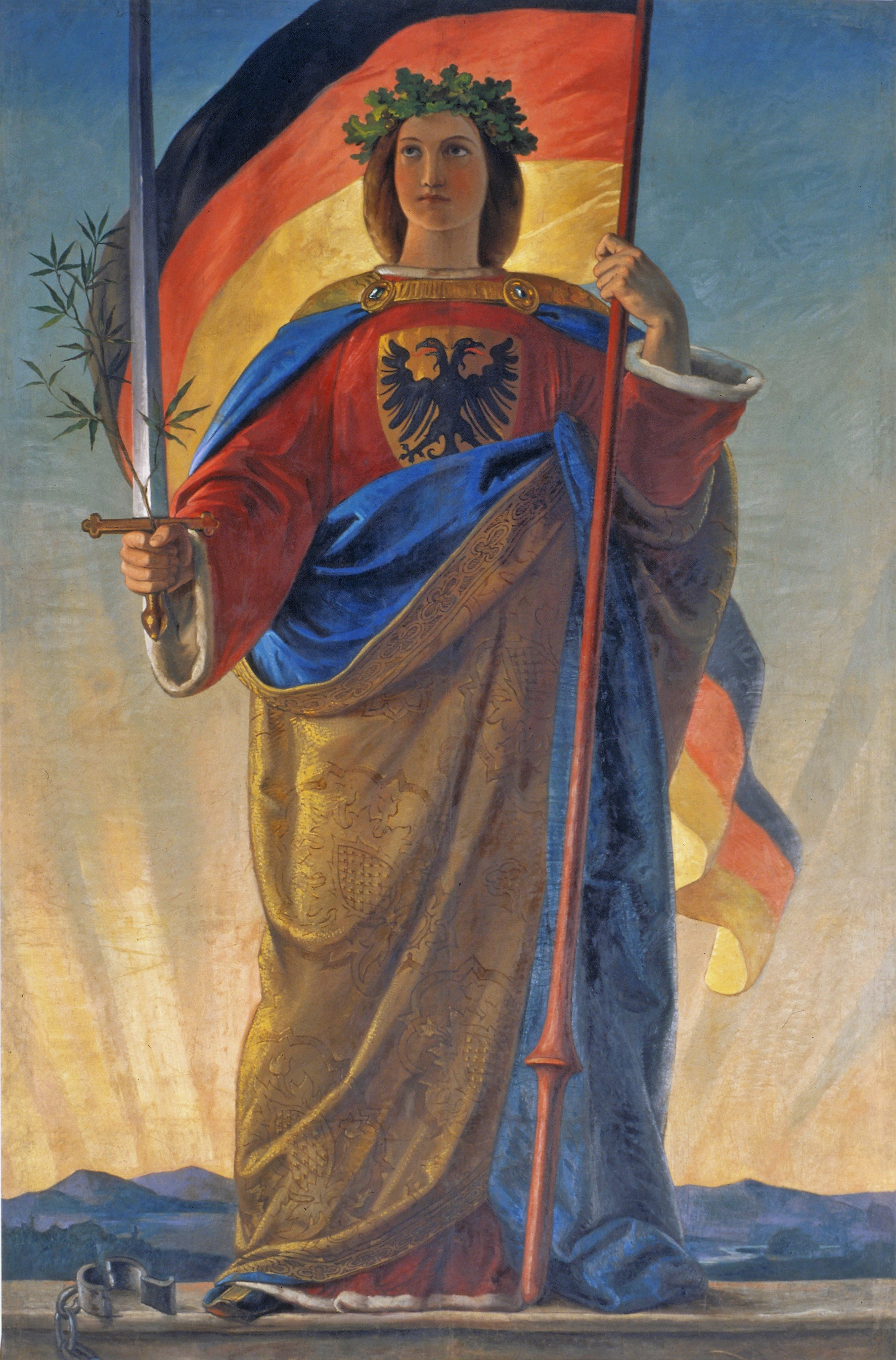
Germania painting from 1848, by Philipp Veit. This image once covered the old organ inside the Paulskirche, above where the Frankfurt Parliament assembled from 1848 to 1849.

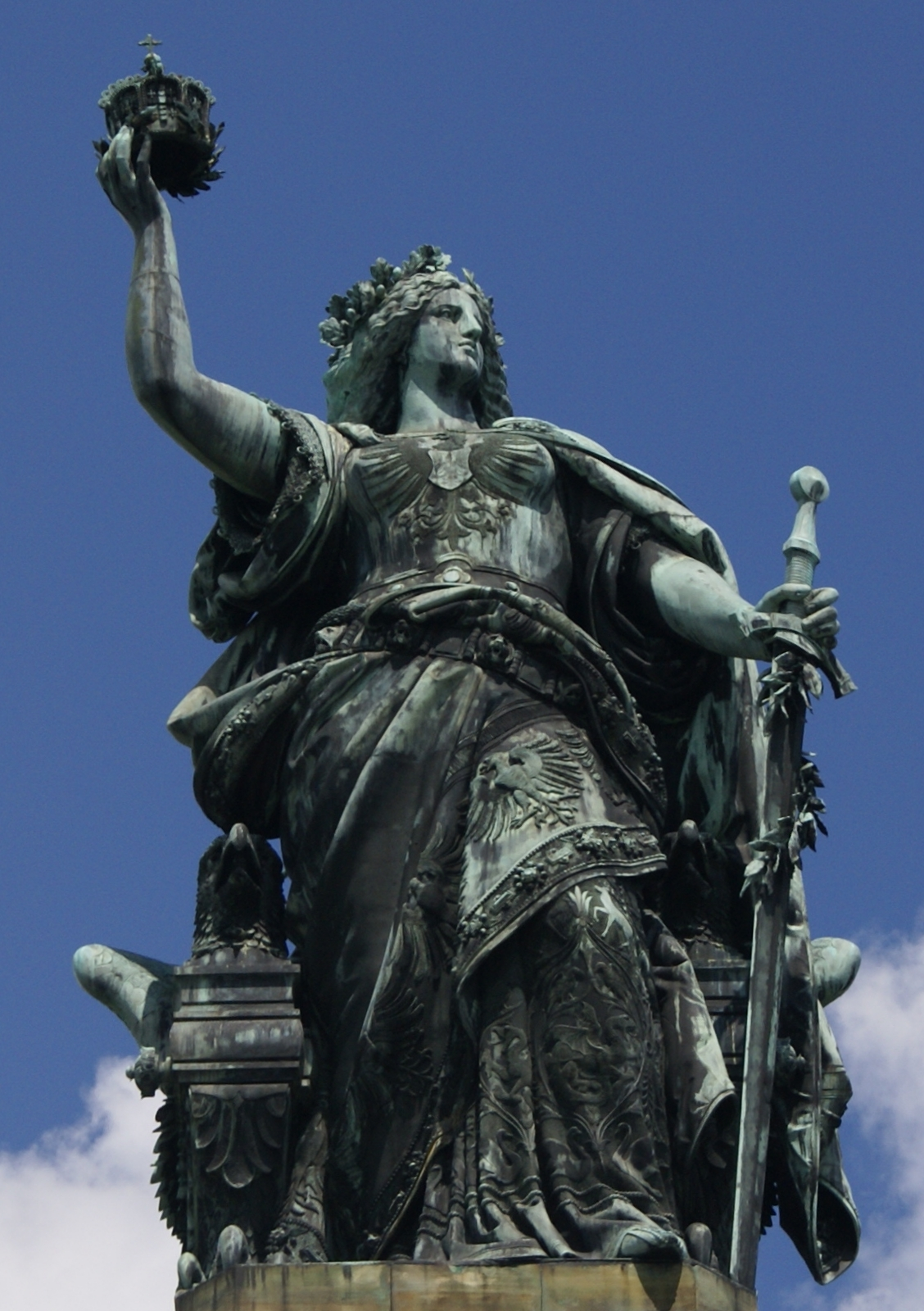
Figure of Germania atop the Niederwalddenkmal in the Rhine valley, dedicated 1883

Germania (/dʒərˈmeɪniə/; Latin: [ɡɛrˈmaːnia]) is the personification of the German nation or the German people as a whole. Like many other national personification symbols, she appeared first during the Roman Era. During the Medieval era, she was usually portrayed as one of the lands or provinces ruled by the emperors of the Holy Roman Empire, and not as the most prominent but in a subordinate position to imperial power and other provinces. Around 1500, together with the birth of the Holy Roman Empire of the German Nation, Emperor Maximilian I and his humanists reinvented her as Mother of the Nation.

She is also commonly associated with the Romantic Era and the Revolutions of 1848, though the figure was later used by Imperial Germany.

== Description ==
"Germania" is the Latin name of the country called "Deutschland" in the spoken language of its own inhabitants, though used as the country's name in various other languages, such as "Germany" in English. In the country itself, the use of the Latin "Germania" was mainly literary and poetical, linked with patriotic and nationalist feelings, like "Helvetia" for Switzerland, "Hibernia" for Ireland, "Caledonia" for Scotland, "Lusitania" for Portugal etc.

Germania as personification is usually depicted as a robust woman with long, flowing, reddish-blonde hair, blue eyes, and wearing armour. She often wields the Reichsschwert (imperial sword), and possesses a medieval-style shield that sometimes bears the image of a black eagle on a gold field. Additionally, she is sometimes shown as carrying or wearing the Imperial Crown of the Holy Roman Empire.

In post-1918 images, the banner she holds is the black-red-gold flag of modern Germany, but in depictions from 1871 to 1918 it is the black-white-red flag of the German Empire.

=== Meanings of some symbols ===
symbol	Significance
Broken chains	Being freed
Breastplate with eagle	Symbol of the German empire - strength
Crown of oak leaves	Heroism
Olive branched Sword	Symbol of power, readiness to fight
Olive branches around the sword	Willingness to make peace
Black, red and gold tricolor	Flag of the liberal-nationalists in 1848; banned by princes of the German states
Rays of the rising sun	Beginning of a new era

== History ==
=== Roman era ===
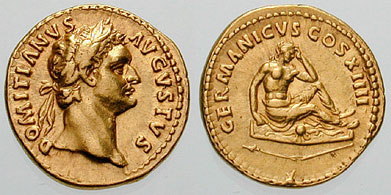
Germania sitting on a shield, with a broken spear, Domitian's aureus, 89

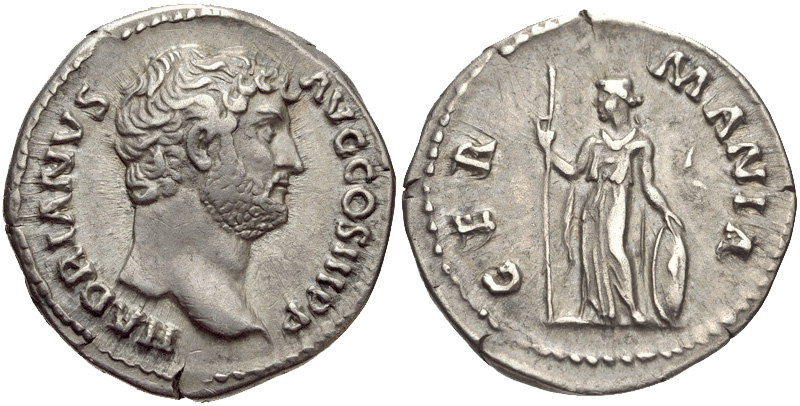
Germania in the guise of Minerva, denarius of Hadrian, 134

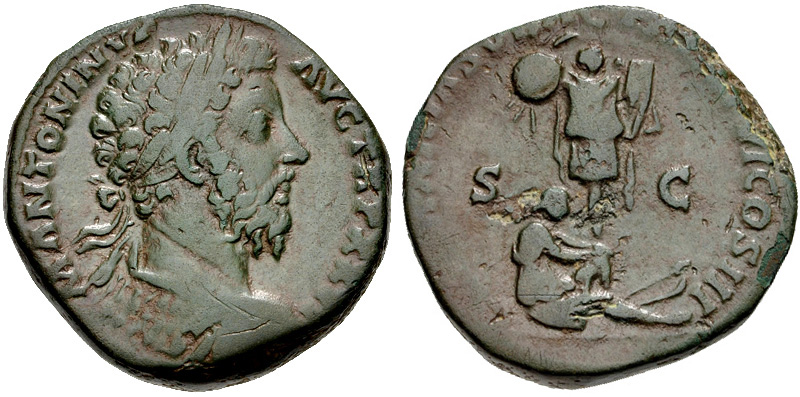
Defeated Germania at the foot of a tropaeum, sesterce of Marcus Aurelius, 172

The figure of Germania appeared in Roman times, usually on coins, at first as a captive Amazon subdued by the Romans. Sometimes, however, she appeared in a more dignified form as manifestation of a more integrative imperial ideology. For example, she was depicted with the attributes of Minerva on a coin in the reign of Hadrian.

Defeated or dignified, she was usually represented with a manly combative spirit, presumably characteristic of her people – their virtus bellatrix or virtus militum. Also in the Roman period, Tacitus ascribed to the Germanic tribes the characteristics of virtus (manliness) and fortitudo (strength).

=== Medieval–Early Modern ===
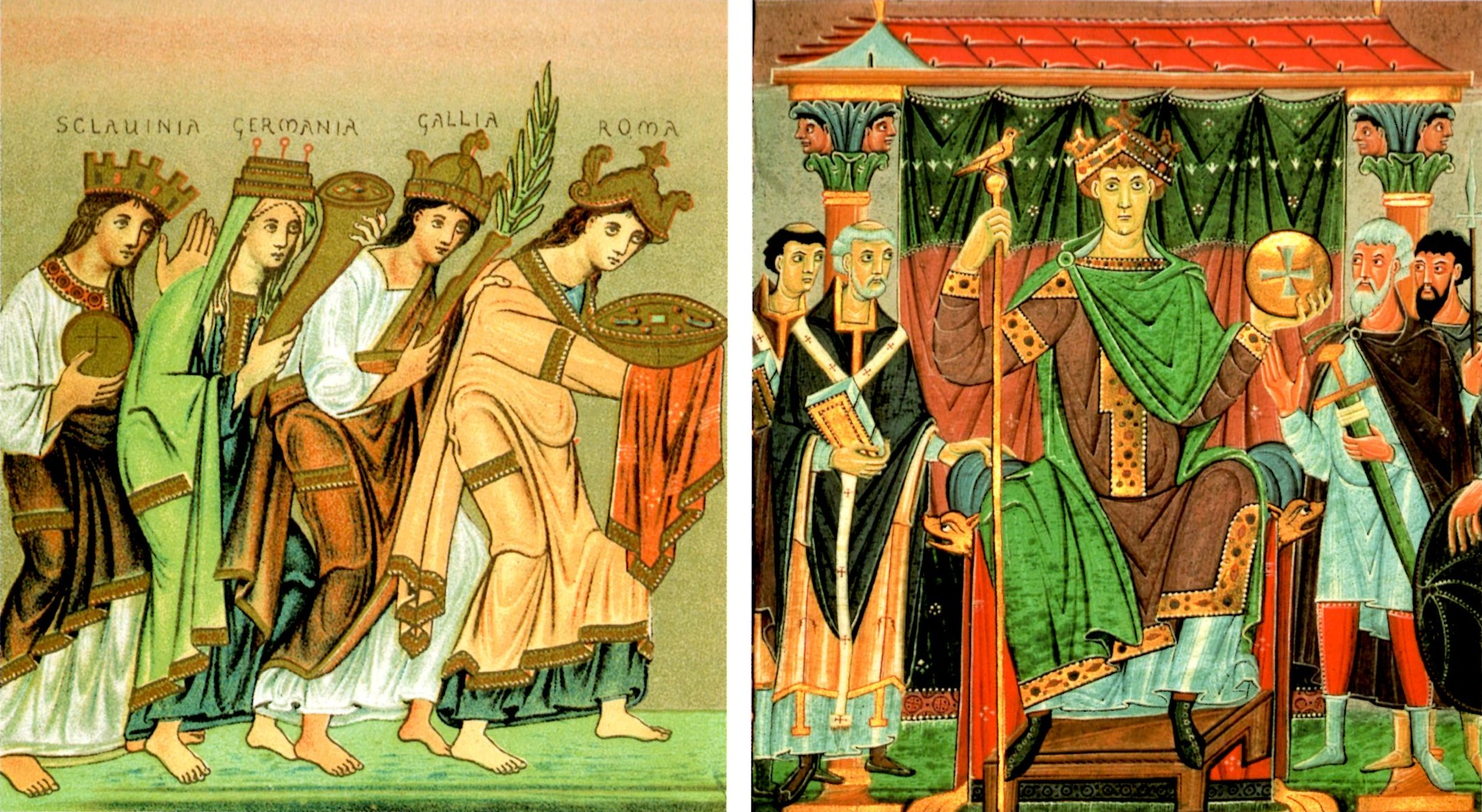
Germania, together with Sclavinia (Slavia), Gallia, and Roma, paying homage to Otto III, 990. Richard Krautheimer defines the lands personified here as the following: "Gallia, which was Rhenish Germany and the Netherlands; Germania, or the lands between the Rhine and the Elbe; Slavia, those east of the Elbe; all three led by Roma, his capital."

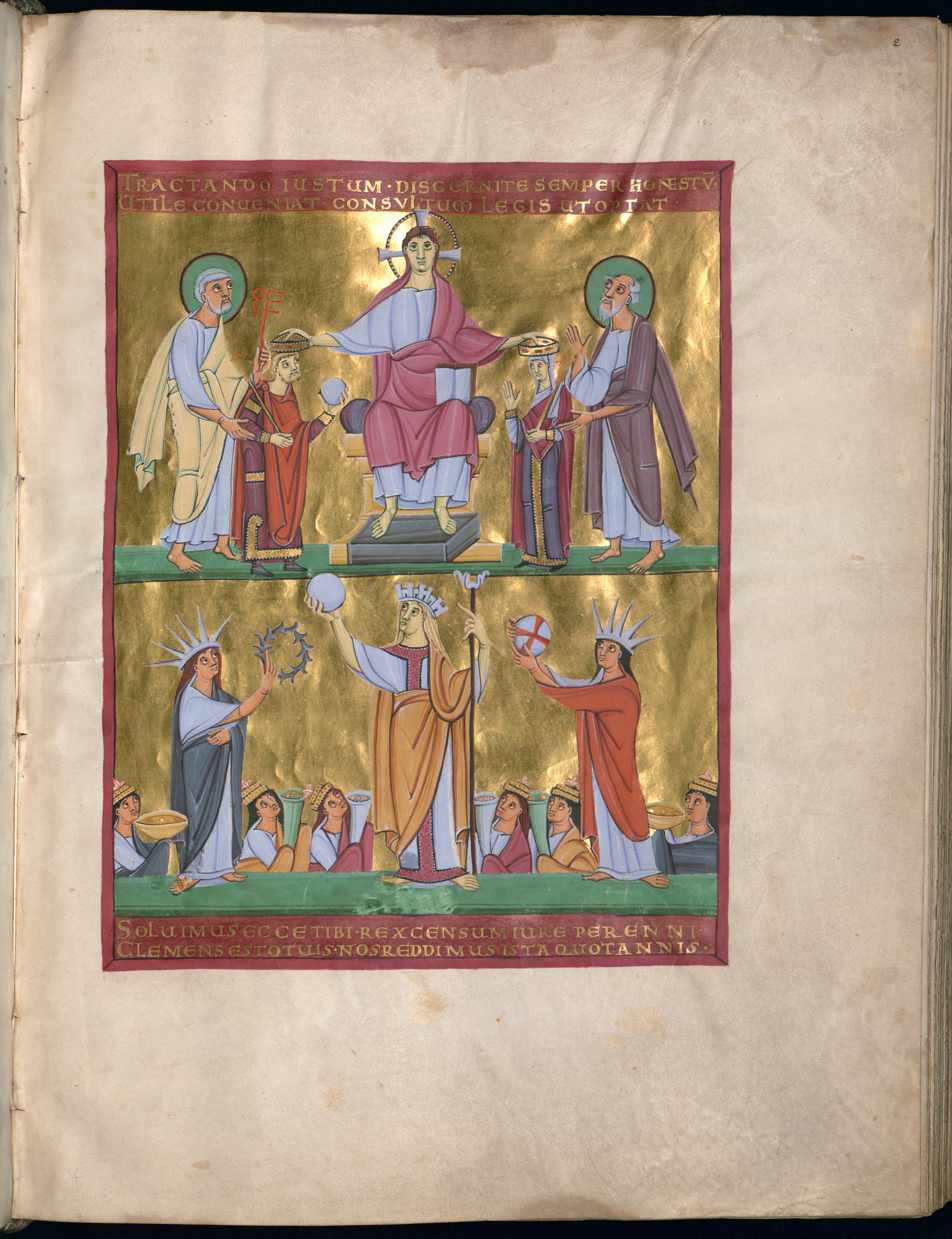
The 1014 coronation of Henry II and Kunigunde. The bottom picture shows Roma (middle), Gallia (left), Germania (right).

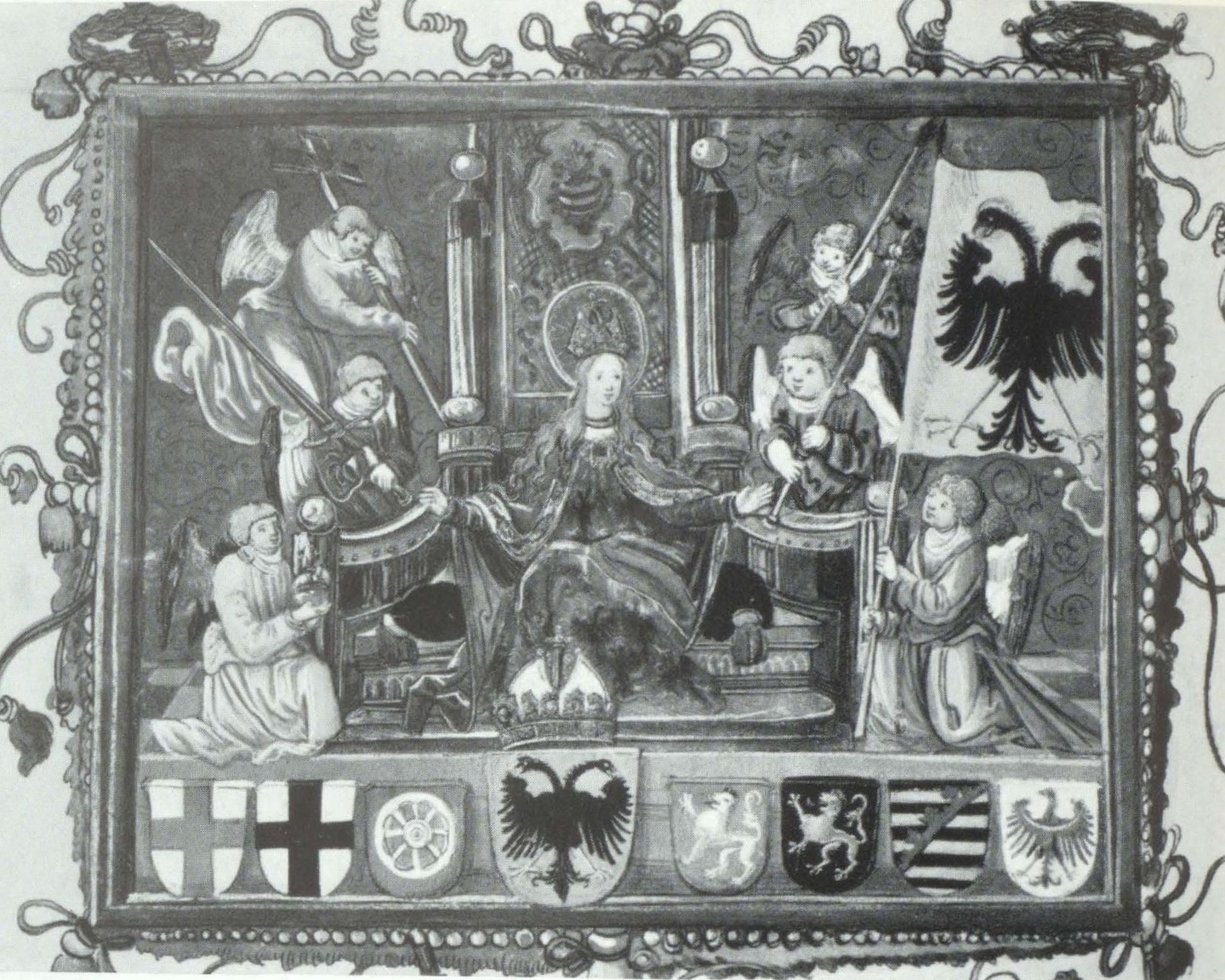
Germania (1512), sitting on the imperial throne, in Maximilian's Triumphal Procession. She now took precedence and was carried in front of Roma.

Germania resurfaced during the Middle Age. She was usually part of a group paying homage to imperial authority. For example, she was shown paying homage to Otto III, together with Slavia, Gallia and Italia.

In another scene (Pericopes of Henry II, Bayrische Staatsbibliothek, CIm 4452, Fol. 2r) showing the 1014 coronation of Emperor Henry II and his empress, Kunigunde, she appeared as one of three provinces (together with Roma and Gallia). This represents Henry's idea of the Empire.

She disappeared in images again after the eleventh century.

During the reign of Maximilian I, the emperor ("an arch-publicist and mythmaker", according to Helen Watanabe-O'Kelly) and his humanists reinvented Germania as the Mother of the Holy Roman Empire of the German Nation. She was now not subordinate to imperial power and other figures any more. Rather, she reflected the self-image of Maximilian and took a central role in his Triumphal Procession (Maximilian died before this project was completed though. When it was first printed in 1526 by Archduke Ferdinand, the future emperor, she disappeared.) She was pacific, yet virile, and as the emperor personally dictated, with her hair loose and wearing a crown. She was presented as Mother, Sovereign Lady (Herrscherin), the Empire and the Birthland, as well as embodiment of Imperial rulership. The humanist Heinrich Bebel also spread a story about his dream, in which Germania told him to talk to her son (Maximilian). Colvin and Watanabe-O'Kelly opine that during the early modern period, the virtues incorporated into the German identity (ethnic purity, fertility. liberty, loyalty, morality, together with virtus and fortitudo as described by Tacitus through the image of Germania were for the Adelsnation (aristocracy) only, relying on a 1519 document that called on the princes and counts (presented as sons of Germania and dedicated to Mars) to support the "German candidate", who would become Charles V, Holy Roman Emperor (although at that point he could not speak German and had never set foot in Germany) against the French king Francis I. Brandt presents a more complicated image: while all major social groups considered the nation as "the framework for political order", the emperor used the image of the nation as his imperial claim to power (opposing the estates and the pope) ruling over all members of the nation, for the Protestant patriots, the emperors and princes were equally subordinate to the godly mother of the empire.

During the turbulent sixteenth and seventeenth centuries, Germania was often presented as torn or ill (Germania degenerans, a humanist motif beginning with Sebastian Brandt (1458–1521)'s Germania und ihre Söhne), showing difficulties in achieving political unity for the Empire.

=== Nineteenth century to the present ===
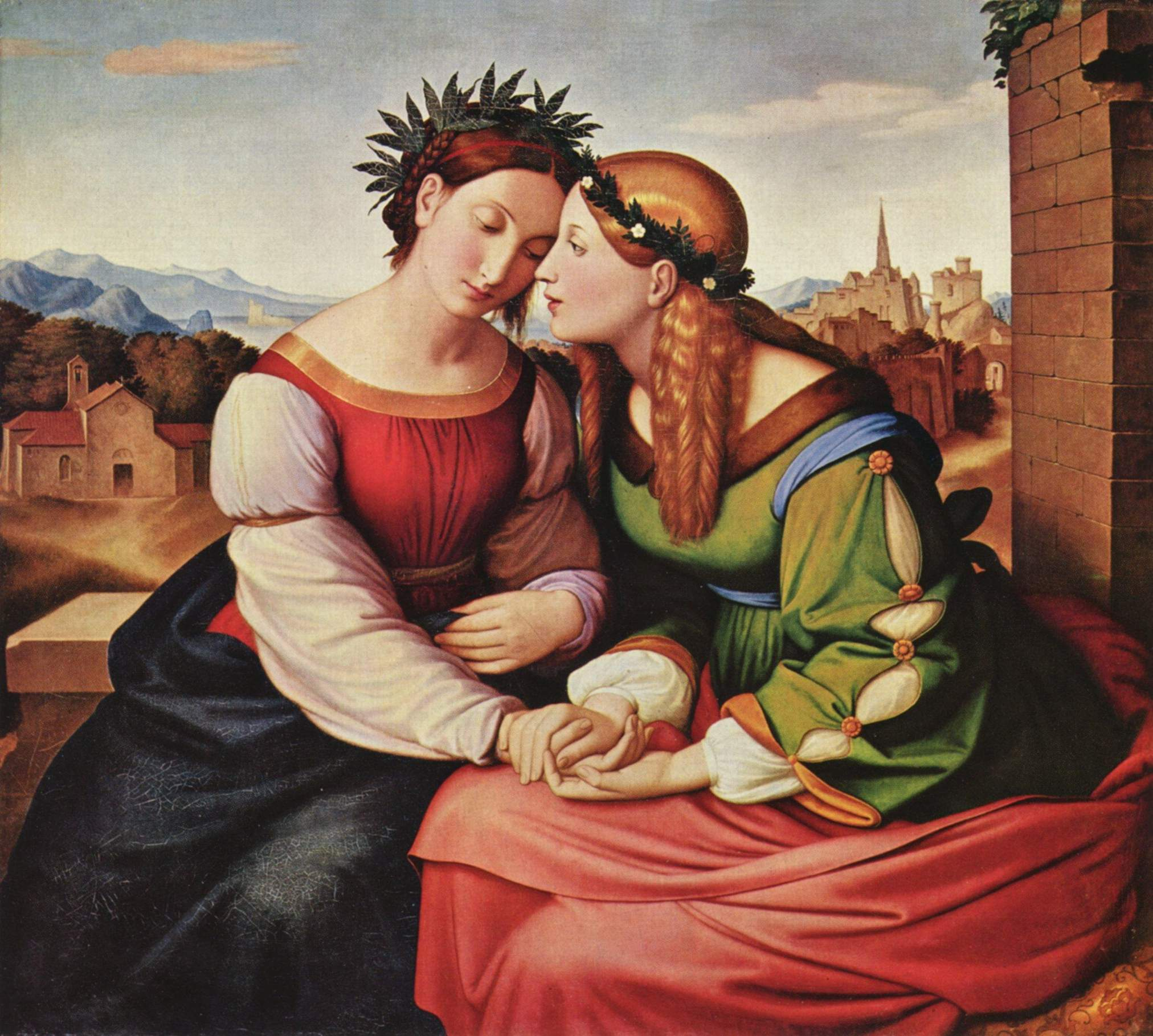
Italia und Germania (1828) by Friedrich Overbeck. An iconic work, described by Pfister as "intercultural romance", that shows Germania as adoring Italia, attracted by her culture and arts. According to Albert Boime, "Germania is an extension of the nationalist romanticism that initially inspired the fraternity in Vienna, now fused with Italia as the perfect union of political and cultural ideals".

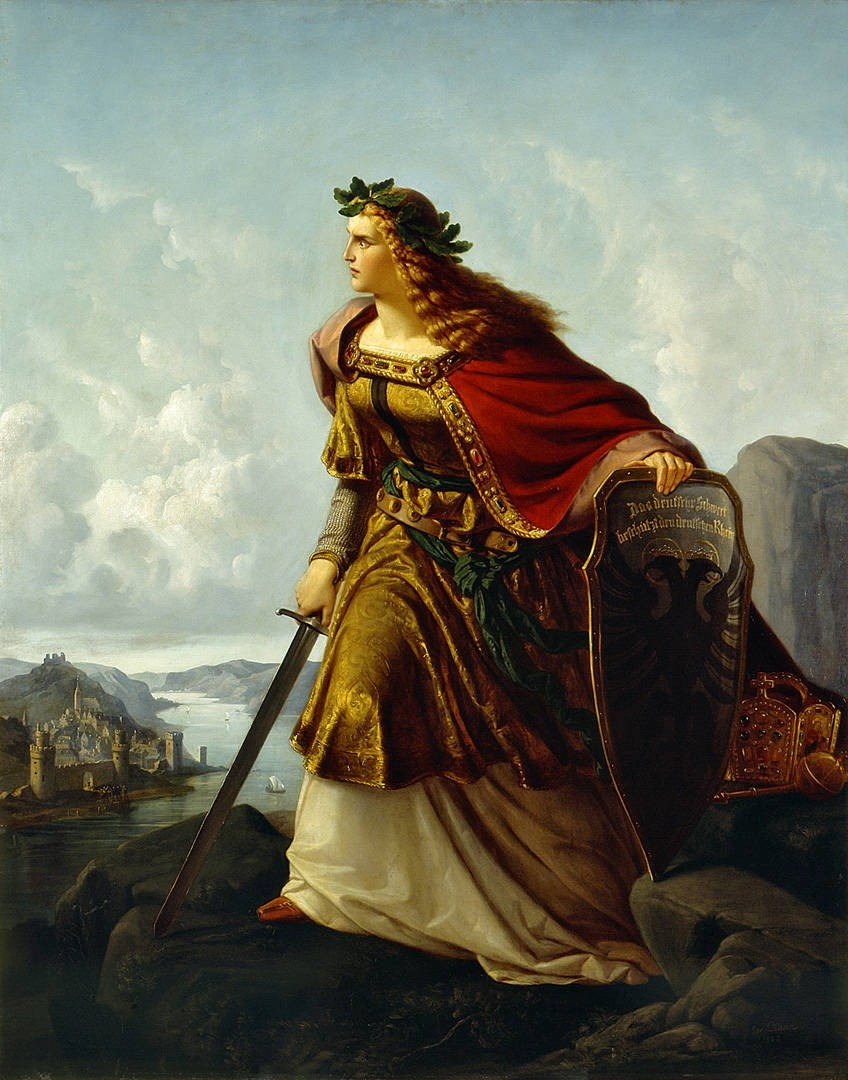
Germania auf der Wacht am Rhein (1860) by Lorenz Clasen. Germania here is a warrior defending her land, not aggressive but watchful.

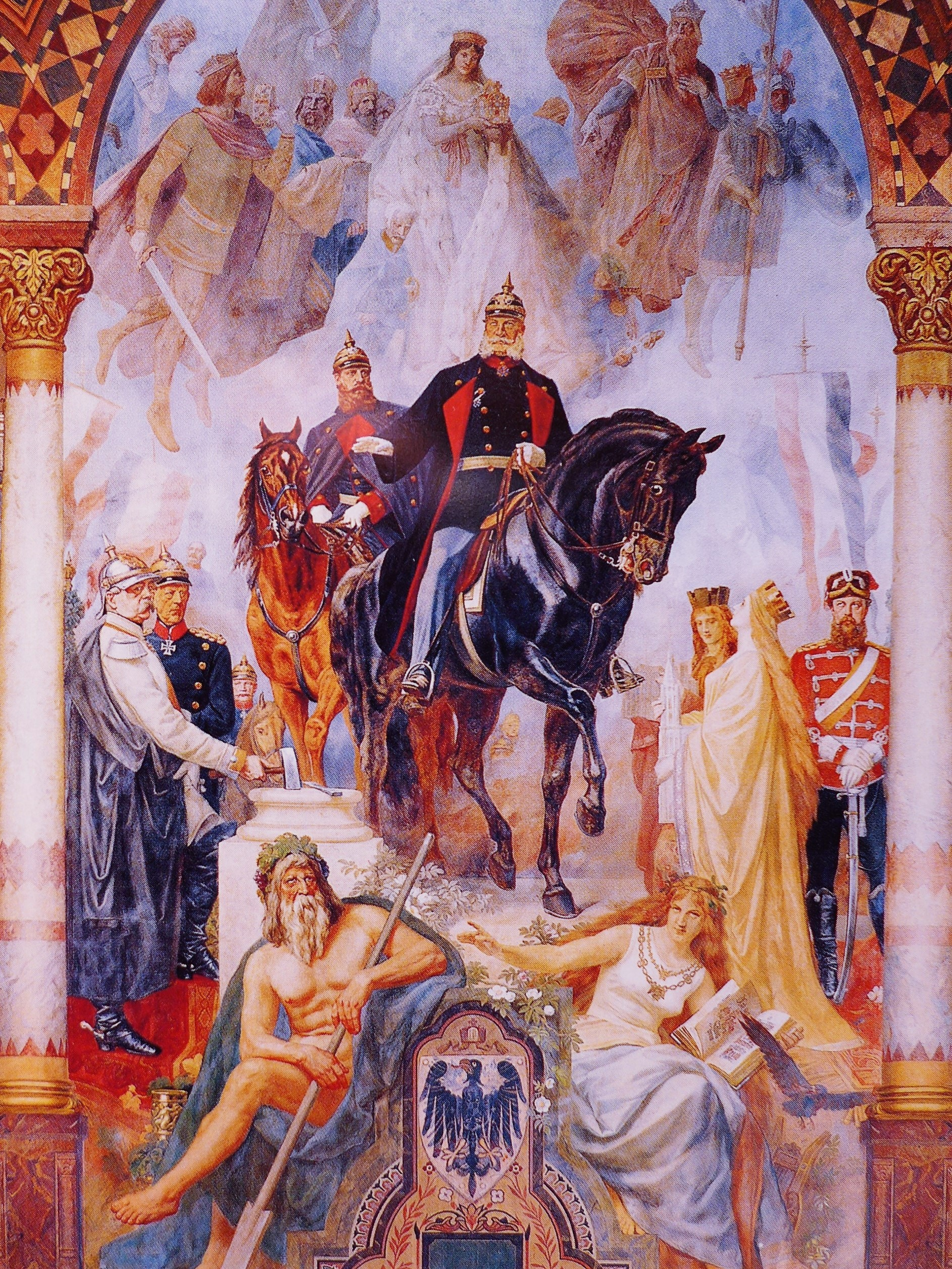
Die Wiedererstehung des Deutschen Reiches 1871 by Wislicenus. Germania appears in the form of Queen Luise, about to crown her son. The figures below are Father Rhein and Legend.

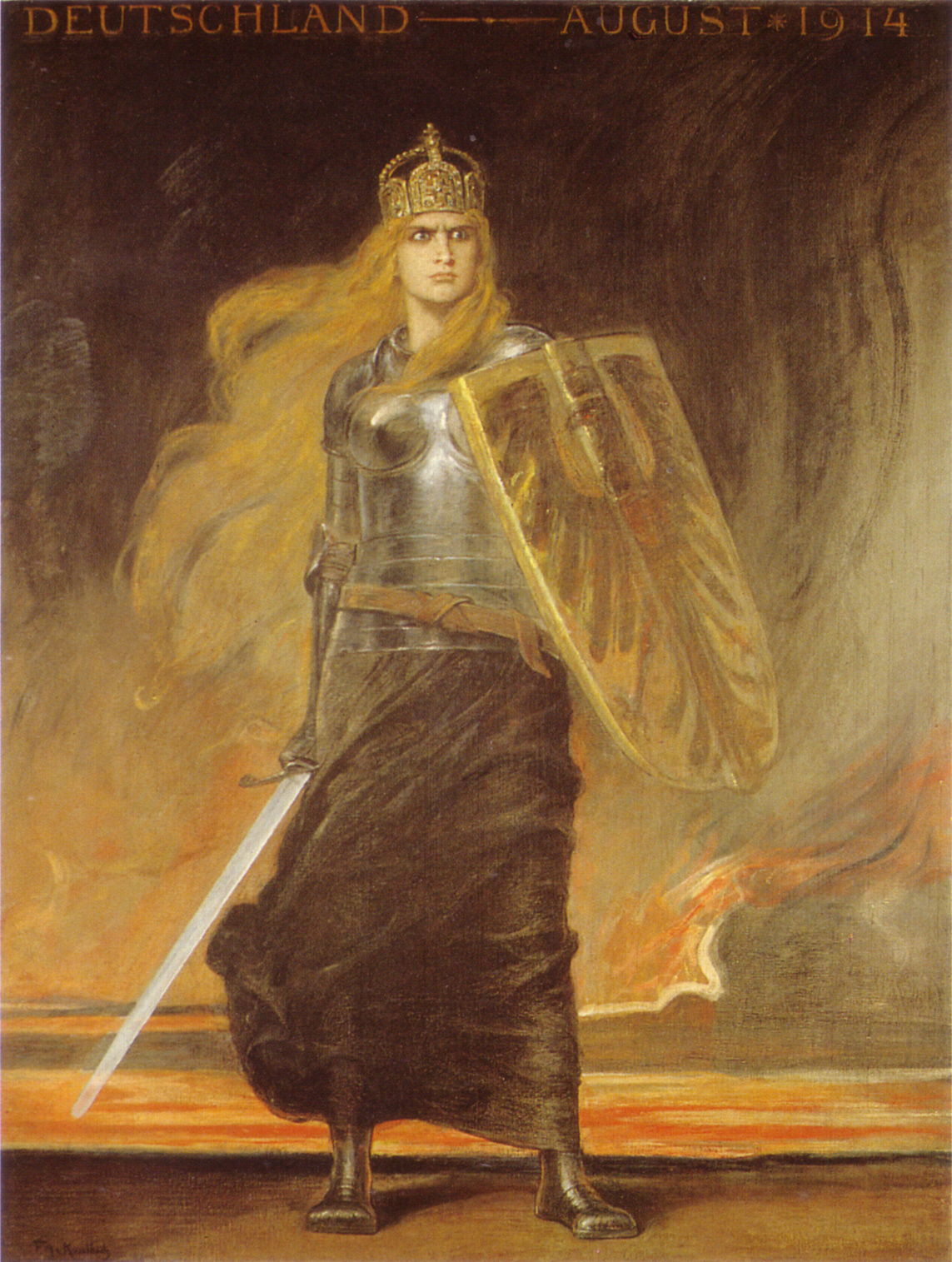
Germania, by Friedrich August von Kaulbach, 1914. A prime example of the more warlike and nationalistic trend beginning in the nineteenth century.

In the nineteenth century, depictions of Germania were given more nationalistic and warlike traits, also a popular trend in contemporary Europe.

In literature too, she appeared as a belligerent mother in Heinrich von Kleist's Germania an ihre kinder.

In The proclamation of the Reich (1871), part of an elaborate imperial iconographical program centred on the old Kaiserpfalz (Imperial Palace) in Goslar, Queen Luise, mother of the new emperor Wilhelm I was presented as Germania.

The most notable recent interpretation is Heiner Müller (1929–1995)'s Germania Tod, in which she functions as a midwife who witnesses Goebbels gives birth to Hitler's child, a deformed wolf.

In 2019, Ruby Commey portrayed Germania in the music video for Rammstein's song Deutschland, which was a number-one single in several countries, but also attracted significant controversy due to her being Afro-German.

== See also ==
- Flag and coat of arms of Germany
- Bavaria statue, personification of the Land of Bavaria
- Berolina, personification of Berlin
- Deutscher Michel, personification of the German people
- Hammonia, personification of Hamburg

== Bibliography ==
- Lionel Gossman. "Making of a Romantic Icon: The Religious Context of Friedrich Overbeck's 'Italia und Germania'." American Philosophical Society, 2007. ISBN 0-87169-975-3.
