= Ruby Commey =

German actress

- Born: 29 July 1991 (age 34); Berlin, Germany
- Occupation: Actress
- Years active: 2013–present

Ruby Commey (born 29 July 1991 in Berlin, Germany) is a German actress. She was born in Berlin and has performed at the Kammerspiele, Deutsches Theater and Berliner Ensemble.

In 2019, she portrayed Germania in the music video for Rammstein's song Deutschland, which was a number-one single in several countries, but also attracted significant controversy due to her African heritage.

== Filmography ==
=== Theater ===
Commey has appeared in various productions. Among them four different productions at the Deutsches Theater in Berlin:, Maxim Gorki Theater, Volksbühne.

- 2013: Vanishing Point Berlin (directed by Tobias Rausch)
- 2014: Tod.Sünde.7 (directed by Wojtek Klemm)
- 2015: Alice (directed by Nora Schlocker)
- 2017: Death of a Salesman (directed by Bastian Kraft)
- 2025: Bluess in schwarz weiss (directed by Lamin Leroy Gibba)
- 2025: Die Legende von Paul und Paula (directed by Murat Dikenci)
- 2026: Die Zwillinge (directed by Joana Tischkau)

=== Music videos ===
- 2019: Deutschland (directed by Specter Berlin)
