= Dicke Titten =

Single by Rammstein

from the album Zeit
- Language: German
- English title: Big Tits
- Released: 27 May 2022
- Recorded: 2021
- Studio: La Fabrique (Saint-Rémy-de-Provence, France)
- Genre: Neue Deutsche Härte
- Length: 3:38
- Label: Universal
- Songwriters: Richard Kruspe; Paul Landers; Till Lindemann; Christian Lorenz; Oliver Riedel; Christoph Schneider
- Producers: Rammstein; Olsen Involtini

Rammstein singles chronology
"Zick Zack" (2022)	"Dicke Titten" (2022)	"Angst" (2022)

Music video
- "Dicke Titten" on YouTube

"Dicke Titten" (German for "Big Tits") is a song by German rock band Rammstein. It was released on 27 May 2022 as the third single from the album Zeit, with its music video premiering the same day. A 7-inch vinyl record alongside a CD single were released on 8 July 2022.

== Background ==
At the beginning of May, a German website Hallo 24 published an article with reference to the Mexican fan page Rammexicanos, speculating that "Dicke Titten" would be the fourth song from the album Zeit to receive a video. A photo was included in the article as proof, showing the six musicians in traditional Alpine costumes and six women in dirndls. The band itself was still keeping a low profile at this point and only announced on 23 May 2022, two days in advance, on their social media channels that the video would premiere on 25 May 2022 at 18:00 CET.

== Music video ==
Snippets of the video were released as teasers on Rammstein's social media pages on 24 May, with the full video for "Dicke Titten" released on 25 May 2022 at 18:00 CET. The video features the members of Rammstein in an Alpine village in Ellmau, Austria, resided largely by women with large breasts. The members of the band, save Till Lindemann, are clothed in traditional lederhosen. Till portrays a blind old man (seemingly in reference to the lyrics of the song) while fellow member Richard Kruspe features as a tailor who secretly cross-dresses in a basement. The video also features a number of innuendo-based humour, with members of the band holding puppies, the women milking cows, and churning butter. At the end of the song, credits are shown as an all-horns score is played by the Sächsische Staatskapelle Dresden.

== Promotion ==
The digital single of "Dicke Titten" was released on 27 May, while the CD and vinyl formats were released on 8 July.

== Reception ==
The US online magazine Loudwire gave a positive review of the song, making the following comments: "The intro of the original 'Big Tits' [...] features an upbeat melody played by a horn section before it explodes into the industrial mayhem we all know [...] Rammstein for." In a review of Zeit, Ferdinand Meyen from Bayerischer Rundfunk wrote that the song with "its catchy chorus, carried by a 'Lebt denn der alte Holzmichl noch' brass music beat" is a "highlight of the record".

== Track listing ==
"Dicke Titten" track listing
No.	Title	Length
1.	"Dicke Titten"	3:38
2.	"Dicke Titten" (LaBrassBanda Version)	3:15

== Charts ==
Chart performance for "Dicke Titten"
Chart (2022–2023)	Peak position
Austria (Ö3 Austria Top 40)	9
Czech Republic Singles Digital (ČNS IFPI)	49
Germany (GfK)	12
Hungary (Single Top 40)	13
Lithuania (AGATA)	68
Netherlands (Single Tip)	11
Sweden (Sverigetopplistan)	65
Switzerland (Schweizer Hitparade)	27

== Certifications ==
Certifications for "Dicke Titten"
Region	Certification	Certified units/sales
Austria (IFPI Austria)	Gold	15,000^{‡}
^{‡} Sales+streaming figures based on certification alone.
