= Untitled Rammstein album =

Untitled

Studio album by Rammstein
- Released: 17 May 2019
- Recorded: 2018
- Studio: La Fabrique (Saint-Rémy-de-Provence)
- Genres: Neue Deutsche Härte; industrial metal
- Length: 46:20
- Label: Universal
- Producers: Olsen Involtini; Rammstein

Rammstein chronology
Rammstein: Paris (2017)	Untitled (2019)	Zeit (2022)

Singles from this album
- 1. "Deutschland" Released: 28 March 2019; 2. "Radio" Released: 26 April 2019; 3. "Ausländer" Released: 28 May 2019

The untitled seventh studio album by German Neue Deutsche Härte band Rammstein, titled Rammstein on digital platforms and on CD-Text enabled devices, was released on 17 May 2019 through Universal Music. Their first studio album in ten years, it is their first not to be produced by Jacob Hellner; it was instead produced by Emigrate guitarist Olsen Involtini, who also serves as Rammstein's live sound engineer.

The album received positive reviews from critics. It was also commercially successful, reaching number one in over ten countries. It set a record for the most units of an album sold in its first week in Germany during the 21st century, and was the best-selling album of 2019 in Germany, Austria, and Switzerland. It was also certified Diamond by the BVMI for selling at least 750,000 copies in Germany. The album was supported by the singles "Deutschland", "Radio", and "Ausländer", with "Deutschland" becoming their second number-one hit in Germany and the other two entering the top 5.

== Composition ==
The album features the band's typical sound of Neue Deutsche Härte and industrial metal. "Zeig dich" criticizes the Catholic church. Backed by "powerful thumping guitar riffs", the lyrics demand religious leaders to "stop hiding behind their so-called Lord". The composition also features a Latin-language choir and Spanish-styled finger picking. Louder thought the song is reminiscent of Mutter's "Zwitter". "Sex" discusses sex as something "'disgusting', yet life-giving" and reminded the portal of Rob Zombie and Queens of the Stone Age. "Puppe" contains a strong doom metal influence, and tells the story of a child playing with their doll in a room while their sister - presumably underage - prostitutes herself at the room beside theirs. As the sister screams, the child grows increasingly agitated until they start biting the doll's head off. The ending verses suggest the child eventually sneaks into the sister's room, finds her being beaten to death and kills the attacker. The instrumentation was described by Louder as having "eerie synths, jangling guitars and pummelling vocals".

"Was ich liebe" may be influenced by Nine Inch Nails' "Closer" and includes an acoustic guitar section similar to one from "Stairway to Heaven" by Led Zeppelin, while "Diamant" is a soft ballad describing "a breakneck voyage through the multifaceted stages of romantic despair". "Weit weg" has elements of Tangerine Dream and Kosmischer Läufer and its lyrics describe a man secretly watching a woman undress through a window, and could be "an allegory for the way cam girls (or, sex workers more broadly) are put at risk from the blurred realities of some of their clients who believe their interactions to be more than they are". "Tattoo" evokes thrash and heavy metal of the 1980s and early 1990s. The lyrics allude to the identification of inmates in German concentration camps while also discussing tattoos as a modern trend. The ending track "Hallomann" is about a child abuser who lures a girl into his car and drowns her later and features "thrumming bass, eerie synths, kick-your-back-door in riffs and a goosebump-inducing vocal".

== Promotion and release ==
In January 2019, Richard Kruspe said there would be five music videos created for the album. Teaser clips for the first music video were released in late March. These clips featured visuals from the video along with the Roman numerals for the date 28 March 2019. On that day, the song "Deutschland" was released as the album's lead single on digital platforms, and its 10-minute-long music video was uploaded onto YouTube. The single also came with a remix by Kruspe. The band said the album had no title and would be released on 17 May 2019. The music video was viewed 19 million times in the first four days after its release. "Deutschland" was released physically as both a 7-inch vinyl and CD single on 12 April, with the remix acting as the B-side. The track list was revealed between 16 April and 19 April on the band's YouTube channel with snippets of riffs from each song. The cover of the album was also revealed there on 18 April. The twenty-seconds video teaser with the album cover presentation featured shots of Kakhovska square in Ukrainian city of Kherson. Less than a week later, the band began teasing a music video for the song "Radio", which was released on 26 April.

The album was released on 17 May 2019 through Universal Music. It was distributed by Vertigo/Capitol in Europe, Spinefarm Records in the United Kingdom, and Caroline International in the United States. Physically, it received a double-180 gram vinyl release and two different CD releases. Both CD releases featured digipak packaging and booklets, with the deluxe edition having more panels and a larger booklet. On 26 May, the band teased a music video for the album's third single, "Ausländer". The video was released on 28 May and the single was released on 31 May.

== Reception ==
=== Critical ===
Professional ratings
Aggregate scores
Source	Rating
AnyDecentMusic?	7.5/10
Metacritic	82/100
Review scores
Source	Rating
AllMusic	4/5 stars
Clash	8/10
Classic Rock	4/5 stars
Consequence of Sound	B+
Exclaim!	8/10
Kerrang!	4/5 stars
musicOMH	4/5 stars
NME	4/5 stars
Rolling Stone	3.5/5 stars
Sputnikmusic	4.2/5

The album received positive reviews. On review aggregator website Metacritic, it holds an average review score of 82/100, based on 11 reviews indicating "universal acclaim". In a positive review, NME wrote, "this album is undoubtedly a resounding triumph". Nick Ruskell at Kerrang! wrote, "this is a record made with care, craft, and nothing allowed in that isn't just-so". Wall of Sound gave the album 9.5/10 stating: "Rammstein is seemingly a culmination of the previous six studio albums, taking the best parts of the last few decades and putting it all in one album, while throwing in a few unexpected surprises." Kory Grow of Rolling Stone wrote, "In some ways, Rammstein have grown up in their decade of hibernation but mostly they have not. The band had ascended in the anything-goes nu-metal Nineties, blending new-wave synths with air-tight heavy-metal guitar riffs and disco drumbeats... Over time, their sound became more polished and more rigid (and by proxy more Germanic?) but they still held onto their puerile impulses. “Deutschland” is the only song of any lyrical consequence on Rammstein — the rest piddle between the benign and letchy. But because it's all in German, it's not entirely clear which is which." Lukas Wojcicky in his review for Exclaim! commented, "Rammstein's Untitled is believed by many to be the band's swan song, as each member's age hovers around 50. Considering the band hadn't released an album in ten years, a retirement announcement would not have come as a surprise, but instead we got one final album and at least a couple of years of touring to follow. For this reason, this album is a welcome addition to Rammstein's discography and one that will be chanted with equal fervour when they come to a city near you."

=== Commercial ===
The album debuted atop the German album charts on issue date 24 May 2019. In the first week in Germany, it moved 260,000 album-equivalent units, making it the best-performing album in the first week from a band in the 21st century. The album spent the next two weeks at No. 2 before climbing back up to No. 1 on 14 June. It spent two more non-consecutive weeks at No. 1 afterward. The album also spent an entire year inside the top 40 of the chart, not leaving it until 12 June 2020. Additionally, it spent 127 consecutive weeks in the chart before leaving it on the week of 29 October 2021.

Elsewhere, the album peaked at No. 3 on the UK Albums Chart, selling 12,130 copies and spent three consecutive weeks atop the UK Rock & Metal Albums Chart. In the United States, the album peaked at No. 9 on the Billboard 200, earning 28,000 album-equivalent units in its first week. The album is the band's first to reach the top 10 in the United States. Additionally, it topped the Hard Rock Albums chart, the second Rammstein album to do so (previously Liebe ist für alle da in 2009) and World Albums chart, which make it the first German-language studio album to top this chart (previously Rammstein: Paris, a live album, topped this chart, in 2017). In 2025, the album was certified Diamond by the Bundesverband Musikindustrie for sales of over 750,000 album-equivalent units in Germany.

=== Accolades ===
Year-end rankings for untitled Rammstein album
Publication	List	Rank
Consequence (United States)	Top 30 Metal + Hard Rock Albums of 2019	16
Contactmusic.com (United Kingdom)	Top 10 Albums of 2019	8
GQ (Russia)	The 20 Best Albums of 2019	—N/a
Kerrang! (United Kingdom)	The 50 Best Albums of 2019	8
Louder Sound (United Kingdom)	Top 20 Rock Albums of 2019	6
Loudwire (United States)	The 50 Best Metal Albums of 2019	—N/a
Revolver (United States)	25 Best Albums of 2019	10
Rolling Stone (United States)	10 Best Metal Albums of 2019	8
Ultimate Guitar (United States)	20 Best Albums of 2019	3

Decade-end rankings for untitled Rammstein album
Publication	List	Rank
Kerrang! (United Kingdom)	The 75 Best Albums of the 2010s	34
Louder Sound (United Kingdom)	The 50 Best Metal Albums of the 2010s	1
Louder Sound (United Kingdom)	The 50 Best Rock Albums of the 2010s	16
Loudwire (United States)	The 66 Best Metal Albums of the Decade	20

== Track listing ==
All tracks are written by Rammstein (Richard Kruspe, Paul Landers, Till Lindemann, Christian Lorenz, Oliver Riedel, Christoph Schneider).

Untitled Rammstein album track listing
No.	Title	Length
1.	"Deutschland" ("Germany")	5:23
2.	"Radio"	4:37
3.	"Zeig dich" ("Show Yourself")	4:15
4.	"Ausländer" ("Foreigner")	3:51
5.	"Sex"	3:56
6.	"Puppe" ("Doll")	4:33
7.	"Was ich liebe" ("What I Love")	4:29
8.	"Diamant" ("Diamond")	2:34
9.	"Weit weg" ("Far Away")	4:20
10.	"Tattoo"	4:11
11.	"Hallomann" ("Helloman")	4:11
Total length:		46:20

== Personnel ==
Rammstein

- Till Lindemann – lead vocals
- Richard Kruspe – lead guitar, additional vocals (track 1)
- Oliver Riedel – bass guitar
- Paul Landers – rhythm guitar
- Christian Lorenz – keyboards
- Christoph Schneider – drums

Additional musicians

- The Academic Choir and the Symphony Orchestra of the National Television and Radio Company of Belarus, Minsk – strings, choir (tracks 3 and 6)
- Meral Al-Mer – backing vocals (tracks 1 and 10)
- Carla Bruhn – backing vocals (track 11)

Technical personnel

- Florian Ammon – engineer, editing
- Ben Bazzazian – programming (track 4)
- Lutz Buch – guitar technician
- Daniel Cayotte – studio assistant
- Siarhei Chaika – recording engineer (tracks 3 and 6)
- Tom Dalgety – additional producer, recording engineer
- Svante Forsbäck – mastering
- Sven Helbig – choir and string arrangements (tracks 3 and 6)
- Olsen Involtini – producer, mixer, recording engineer
- Dzmitry Karshakevich – recording engineer
- Wilhelm Keitel – conductor (tracks 3 and 6)
- Rammstein – producer
- Rossi Rossberg – drum technician
- Sky van Hoff – additional producer, recording engineer

Other personnel

- Jes Larsen – photography
- Rocket & Wink – artwork

== Charts ==
=== Weekly charts ===
Weekly chart performance for untitled Rammstein album
Chart (2019)	Peak position
Australian Albums (ARIA)	5
Austrian Albums (Ö3 Austria)	1
Belgian Albums (Ultratop Flanders)	1
Belgian Albums (Ultratop Wallonia)	1
Canadian Albums (Billboard)	5
Croatian International Albums (HDU)	1
Czech Albums (ČNS IFPI)	2
Danish Albums (Hitlisten)	1
Dutch Albums (Album Top 100)	1
Finnish Albums (Suomen virallinen lista)	1
French Albums (SNEP)	1
German Albums (Offizielle Top 100)	1
Greek Albums (IFPI Greece)	4
Hungarian Albums (MAHASZ)	2
Irish Albums (IRMA)	11
Italian Albums (FIMI)	5
Japanese Albums (Oricon)	39
Latvian Albums (LAIPA)	2
Lithuanian Albums (AGATA)	4
Mexican Albums (AMPROFON)	3
New Zealand Albums (RMNZ)	18
Norwegian Albums (VG-lista)	1
Polish Albums (ZPAV)	1
Portuguese Albums (AFP)	1
Scottish Albums (Official Charts)	2
Spanish Albums (Promusicae)	2
Swedish Albums (Sverigetopplistan)	2
Swiss Albums (Schweizer Hitparade)	1
UK Albums (Official Charts)	3
UK Rock & Metal Albums (Official Charts)	1
US Billboard 200	9
US Top Hard Rock Albums (Billboard)	1
US Top Rock Albums (Billboard)	2

=== Year-end charts ===
2019 year-end chart performance for untitled Rammstein album
Chart (2019)	Position
Austrian Albums (Ö3 Austria)	1
Belgian Albums (Ultratop Flanders)	3
Belgian Albums (Ultratop Wallonia)	19
Czech Albums (ČNS IFPI)	8
Danish Albums (Hitlisten)	58
Dutch Albums (Album Top 100)	17
French Albums (SNEP)	57
German Albums (Offizielle Top 100)	1
Icelandic Albums (Plötutíóindi)	38
Polish Albums (ZPAV)	30
Spanish Albums (PROMUSICAE)	63
Swedish Albums (Sverigetopplistan)	30
Swiss Albums (Schweizer Hitparade)	1
US Top Rock Albums (Billboard)	97
Worldwide Albums (IFPI)	9

2020 year-end chart performance for untitled Rammstein album
Chart (2020)	Position
Austrian Albums (Ö3 Austria)	46
Belgian Albums (Ultratop Flanders)	81
Belgian Albums (Ultratop Wallonia)	198
German Albums (Offizielle Top 100)	25
Swiss Albums (Schweizer Hitparade)	88

2021 year-end chart performance for untitled Rammstein album
Chart (2021)	Position
Austrian Albums (Ö3 Austria)	59
German Albums (Offizielle Top 100)	71

2022 year-end chart performance for untitled Rammstein album
Chart (2022)	Position
Austrian Albums (Ö3 Austria)	29
Belgian Albums (Ultratop Flanders)	94
German Albums (Offizielle Top 100)	30
Swiss Albums (Schweizer Hitparade)	92

2023 year-end chart performance for untitled Rammstein album
Chart (2023)	Position
Austrian Albums (Ö3 Austria)	62
Belgian Albums (Ultratop Flanders)	143
German Albums (Offizielle Top 100)	44

2024 year-end chart performance of untitled Rammstein album
Chart (2024)	Position
Belgian Albums (Ultratop Flanders)	175
German Albums (Offizielle Top 100)	56

=== Decade-end charts ===
Decade-end chart performance for untitled Rammstein album
Chart (2010–2019)	Position
German Albums (Offizielle Top 100)	17

== Certifications ==
Certifications for untitled Rammstein album
Region	Certification	Certified units/sales
Austria (IFPI Austria)	2× Platinum	30,000^{‡}
Belgium (BRMA)	Gold	10,000^{‡}
Brazil (Pro-Música Brasil)	Gold	20,000^{‡}
Czech Republic (IFPI)	Gold	
Denmark (IFPI Danmark)	Platinum	20,000^{‡}
France (SNEP)	Platinum	100,000^{‡}
Germany (BVMI)	Diamond	750,000^{‡}
Hungary (MAHASZ)	2× Platinum	8,000^{‡}
Italy (FIMI)	Gold	25,000^{‡}
Poland (ZPAV)	2× Platinum	40,000^{‡}
Switzerland (IFPI Switzerland)	Platinum	20,000^{‡}
United Kingdom (BPI)	Silver	60,000^{‡}
^{‡} Sales+streaming figures based on certification alone.

== Release history ==
Release history and formats for untitled Rammstein album
Region	Date	Format	Label	Ref.
Various	17 May 2019	Download; streaming	Universal	
Various	17 May 2019	12-inch vinyl	Universal	
Various	17 May 2019	CD (standard edition)	Universal	
