= Adieu (Rammstein song) =

Single by Rammstein

from the album Zeit
- Language: German
- English title: Farewell
- B-side: "Adieu - RMX by Richard Z. Kruspe; Adieu - RMX by Andrea Marino"
- Released: 25 November 2022
- Recorded: 2021
- Studio: La Fabrique (Saint-Rémy-de-Provence, France)
- Genre: Neue Deutsche Härte
- Length: 4:39
- Label: Universal
- Songwriters: Richard Kruspe; Paul Landers; Till Lindemann; Christian Lorenz; Oliver Riedel; Christoph Schneider

Rammstein singles chronology
| "Angst" (2022) | "Adieu" (2022) |

Music video
- "Adieu" on YouTube

"Adieu" (German pronunciation: [aˈdjøː]; French pronunciation: [adjø]; French for Farewell) is a song by German industrial metal band Rammstein, released as the fifth single from their eighth studio album Zeit.

== Music video ==
A music video for the song was released on 24 November 2022.

The music video took place in the Palais Garnier and in a studio in Paris, France. It was directed by the German director Specter Berlin, who had already directed Deutschland.

== Track listing ==
| No. | Title | Length |
|---|---|---|
| 1. | "Adieu" | 4:39 |
| 2. | "Adieu" (RMX by Richard Z. Kruspe) | 4:42 |
| 3. | "Adieu" (RMX by Andrea Marino) | 4:04 |

== Charts ==
Chart performance for "Adieu"
| Chart (2022) | Peak position |
|---|---|
| Austria (Ö3 Austria Top 40) | 48 |
| Germany (GfK) | 13 |
| Switzerland (Schweizer Hitparade) | 56 |
