= Trudelturm =

Tower in Berlin

Coordinates: 52.4318°N 13.5294°E

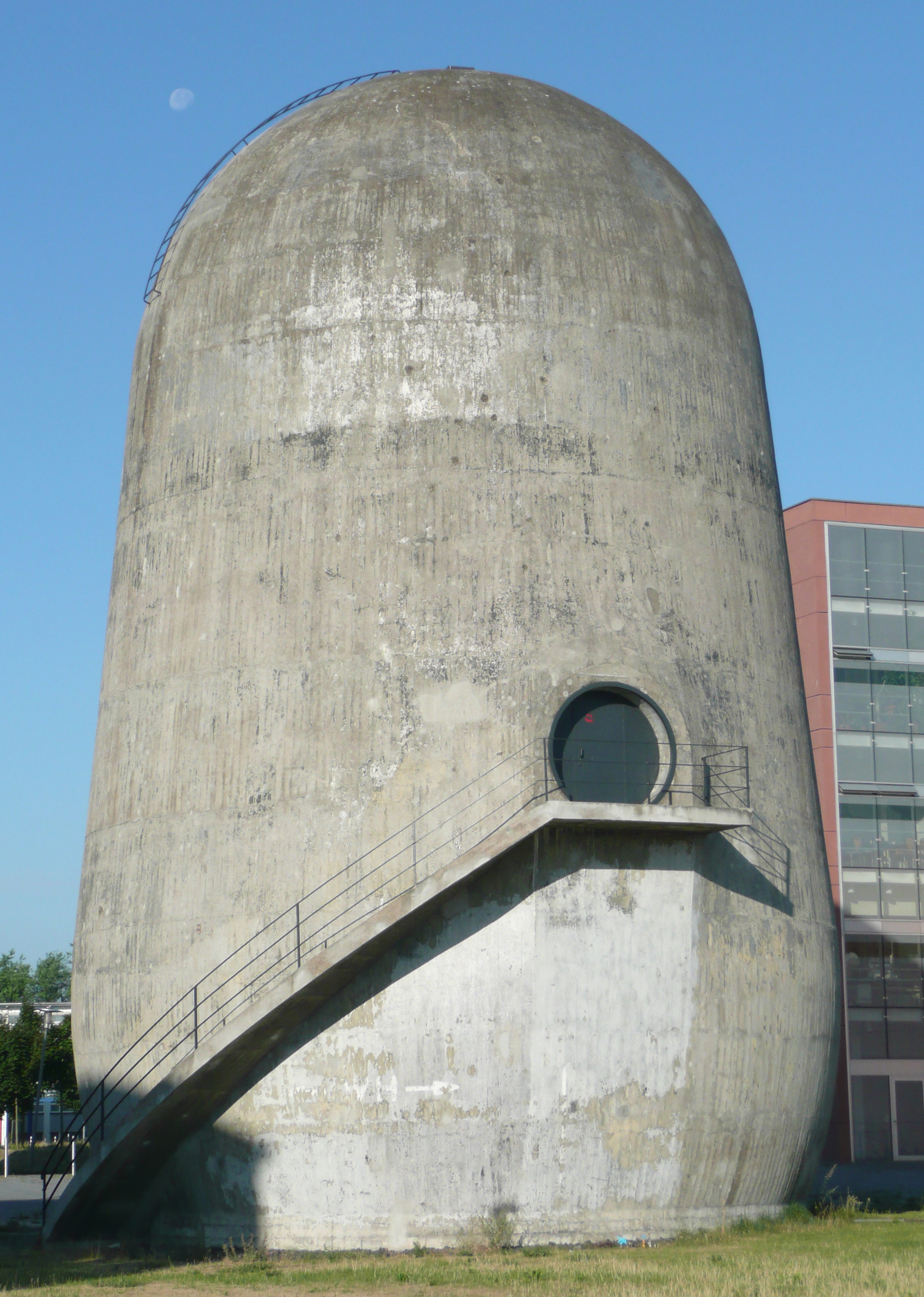
The Trudelturm in Aerodynamic Park, Berlin

The Trudelturm (English: "spin tower") is an approximately 20-meter-high former specialist wind tunnel in the Adlershof district of Berlin, Germany.

The building, also known as the "Trudelwindkanal" ("spin wind tunnel"), was built by the German Aviation Research Institute (Deutsche Versuchsanstalt für Luftfahrt, DVL) between 1934 and 1936 at the former Berlin-Johannisthal airfield. It stands next to the approximately 130-meter-long Großer Windkanal ("big wind tunnel") from the same period. Both are listed on the Berlin State Monuments List as part of the former DVL site.

When it was built, the tower represented a technical innovation that for the first time made it possible to simulate the dangerous condition of aircraft spin in the laboratory. The experiments helped to better understand the complex processes involved in spinning. For example, it was determined how to intercept and regain control of aircraft "lurching" toward the earth without a pilot. A (precisely manufactured) model could be inserted into a vertical (bottom-up) airflow in such a way that it always flew at the height of the observation facility and could be filmed by high-speed cameras. The speed of the airflow could be regulated to match the speed of the model's fall. The internals are no longer in place.

The tower currently belongs to the Aerodynamic Park on the Adlershof campus of Humboldt University and is part of the building ensemble of Technical Monuments of Aviation Research in Berlin-Adlershof of the 1930s. The entire site is part of the Adlershof WISTA science and technology park, which has been developed since 1992 on an area of around 420 hectares. Since 2005, a connecting path between Max-Born-Strasse and Brook-Taylor-Strasse has borne the name Zum Trudelturm ("to the Trudelturm").

== In popular culture ==
In 2005, the tower served as the backdrop for a scene in the science fiction film Æon Flux, which is set 400 years in the future. The leading actress Charlize Theron runs up the outside staircase.

On the cover of Rammstein's 2022 album Zeit, the members of the band are shown walking down the outside stairs of the building. The photograph used for the cover art was taken by Canadian musician Bryan Adams.
