= Angst (Rammstein song) =

Single by Rammstein

from the album Zeit
- Language: German
- English title: Fear
- B-side: "Angst - Twocolors RMX"
- Released: 26 August 2022
- Recorded: 2021
- Studio: La Fabrique (Saint-Rémy-de-Provence, France)
- Genre: Neue Deutsche Härte
- Length: 3:44
- Label: Universal
- Songwriters: Richard Kruspe; Paul Landers; Till Lindemann; Christian Lorenz; Oliver Riedel; Christoph Schneider

Rammstein singles chronology
"Dicke Titten" (2022)	"Angst" (2022)	"Adieu" (2022)

Music video
- "Angst" on YouTube

"Angst" (German pronunciation: [aŋst]; "Fear") is a song by German industrial metal band Rammstein, released as the fourth single from their eighth studio album Zeit.

A music video for the song was released on 29 April 2022, the same day as its parent studio album.

== Background ==
According to a track by track review of the lyrics by Oxford University Professor of Modern German Literature Karen Leeder, Angst is a song about the fear of the unknown, and the escalation of what that fear brings with it. Leeder goes onto state: 'The song has its roots in an eighteenth-century German playground game, Black Man, a game bound up in folklore and plague history, and there are more hints of Goethe's famous ‘Erlkönig’ (‘King of the Elves’) poem, in which a goblin comes to steal a child as the incarnation of fear. But with the householders locking themselves away, we certainly hear warnings about COVID and Fortress Europe.'

== Music video ==
On 27 April 2022, a 30-second teaser was released two days before the release of the music video.

At the beginning the music video shows the six band members in a circular plot of land of equal size, everyone gets along well with each other. Frontman Till Lindemann is brought to a lectern by ghastly made-up cheerleaders in a straitjacket and hooked up to hoses, after which he begins addressing an unshown crowd. Gradually, the band members are increasingly skeptical about their environment and fellow human beings, which is why they erect walls, install video cameras, roll out barbed wire and use assault rifles. In the meantime, the band members are also shown sitting in front of computer monitors and literally absorbing the content. As the musicians point their guns at the monitors located on the small "plots" of the circle, towards the end, a black hole opens up, engulfing the group. Interspersed are scenes of the cheerleaders, who move rhythmically towards the camera in a triangle formation. Also before the music starts and at the end of the video, a young woman and a girl, both dark-skinned, are seen wrapped in blankets and surrounded by barbed wire. During the end credits, Till Lindemann smashed the television set with a lawnmower while the other band members watched and ate Chocolate-coated marshmallow treats.

== Critical reception ==
Consequence Sound gave "Angst" a positive review by giving it their song of the week honour. John Hadusek stated: 'Angst is a metallic crusher, structured around a tight central riff that drives forward. Meanwhile, ominous chorus chants and the imitably deep voice of frontman Till Lindemann are layered amongst the sonic fray.'. While Jack Rogers, writing for Rock Sounds states that 'It's a unique look at the way that we consume media and what it does to us, whilst also being incredibly dark and discomforting'.

== Track listing ==
No.	Title	Length
1.	"Angst"	3:44
2.	"Angst" (RMX by twocolors)	4:01

== Charts ==
Chart performance for "Angst"
Chart (2022)	Peak position
Austria (Ö3 Austria Top 40)	21
Germany (GfK)	5
Hungary (Single Top 40)	11
Sweden (Sverigetopplistan)	71
Switzerland (Schweizer Hitparade)	19
