= Ausländer (Rammstein song) =

2019 song by Rammstein

Single by Rammstein

from the album Untitled
- B-side: "Radio"; remixes
- Released: 28 May 2019
- Recorded: 2018
- Studio: La Fabrique (Saint-Rémy-de-Provence, France)
- Genre: Industrial metal
- Length: 3:51
- Label: Universal
- Songwriters: Richard Kruspe; Paul Landers; Till Lindemann; Christian Lorenz; Oliver Riedel; Christoph Schneider
- Producers: Olsen Involtini; Rammstein

Rammstein singles chronology
"Radio" (2019)	"Ausländer" (2019)	"Zeit" (2022)

Music video
- "Ausländer" on YouTube

"Ausländer" (German pronunciation: [ˈaʊslɛndɐ]; "Foreigner") is a song by German Neue Deutsche Härte band Rammstein. It was released as the third single from the band's untitled seventh studio album; it received a music video release on 28 May 2019 and physical releases on 31 May. It reached number two in Germany and the top 40 in Austria and Switzerland.

== Music video ==
The video was released online on 28 May 2019 at 19:00 CET following a 15-second preview for the video one day prior. The video was directed by Jörn Heitmann and filmed in Cape Town.

== Track listing ==
CD
No.	Title	Length
1.	"Ausländer"	3:51
2.	"Radio"	4:37
3.	"Ausländer" (RMX by R3hab)	3:49
4.	"Ausländer" (RMX by Felix Jaehn)	3:27
5.	"Radio" (RMX by Twocolors)	5:00

10" vinyl
No.	Title	Length
1.	"Ausländer"	3:51
2.	"Radio"	4:37
3.	"Radio" (RMX by Twocolors)	5:00

== Charts ==
Chart performance for "Ausländer"
Chart (2019)	Peak position
Austria (Ö3 Austria Top 40)	29
Belgium (Ultratip Bubbling Under Flanders)	2
CIS Airplay (TopHit)	83
Germany (GfK)	2
Hungary (Single Top 40)	19
Hungary (Stream Top 40)	29
Sweden Heatseeker (Sverigetopplistan)	3
Switzerland (Schweizer Hitparade)	38
UK Rock & Metal (Official Charts)	29

2023 chart performance for "Ausländer"
Chart (2023)	Peak position
Lithuania (AGATA)	70

== Certifications ==
Region	Certification	Certified units/sales
Austria (IFPI Austria)	Gold	15,000^{‡}
Brazil (Pro-Música Brasil)	Gold	20,000^{‡}
France (SNEP)	Gold	100,000^{‡}
Germany (BVMI)	Gold	200,000^{‡}
Poland (ZPAV)	Gold	25,000^{‡}
^{‡} Sales+streaming figures based on certification alone.

== Release history ==
Region	Date	Format	Label	Catalogue number	Ref.
Various	28 May 2019	Download; streaming	Universal	—N/a	TBD
Various	31 May 2019	10-inch	Universal	7764268	
Various	31 May 2019	CD	Universal	7788944	
