= Radio (Rammstein song) =

2019 song by Rammstein

Single by Rammstein

from the album Untitled
- B-side: "twocolors Remix"
- Released: 26 April 2019
- Recorded: 2018
- Studio: La Fabrique (Saint-Rémy-de-Provence, France)
- Genre: Neue Deutsche Härte
- Length: 4:37
- Label: Universal
- Songwriters: Richard Kruspe; Paul Landers; Till Lindemann; Christian Lorenz; Oliver Riedel; Christoph Schneider
- Producers: Olsen Involtini; Rammstein

Rammstein singles chronology
"Deutschland" (2019)	"Radio" (2019)	"Ausländer" (2019)

Music video
- "Radio" on YouTube

"Radio" (German pronunciation: [ˈʁaːdi̯o]) is a song by German Neue Deutsche Härte band Rammstein. It was released as the second single from the band's untitled seventh studio album on 26 April 2019.

Lyrically, the song addresses the cultural situation of the German Democratic Republic, in which secretly listening to western radio stations and their music, which were deemed illegal by the East German government, was a way to escape the political restrictions. Metal Hammer stated the song's riff may have been influenced by "Love Like Blood", by Killing Joke.

== Music video ==
The video, which is almost entirely black and white, was released online on 26 April 2019 at 11:00 CET following a 26-second black and white preview for the video two days prior, containing Kraftwerk and Klaus Nomi references. On selected radio stations the song premiered on 25 April 2019 at 21:00 CET, while the video was shown exclusively on the wall of a house - without sound - in Berlin. The video was directed by Jörn Heitmann.

The video opens with a radio announcement (absent in the album version) that says "Achtung, Achtung. Hier ist Berlin Königs Wusterhausen und der Deutsche Kurzwellensender. Wir senden Tanzmusik", which translates as "Attention, Attention. This is Berlin Königs Wusterhausen and the German shortwave transmitter. We're broadcasting dance music". Königs Wusterhausen is the site where the first German radio transmitter was built, in 1920. In 1933, it was seized by the Nazi regime in order to broadcast propaganda. After the Reunification of Germany, it became a museum.

It depicts the band dressed up in tuxedos from various decades (with the notable exception of bassist Oliver Riedel who wears a black turtleneck sweater like a 50's Beatnik and performs barefoot) at a radio performance set roughly in the 1920s. During the final chorus, the performance is set to be shut down by a police squad but it is revealed that the band members are holograms and thus unaffected by the use of violent force. The performance scenes are intercut with scenes of citizens being obsessed with their radios to a manic degree as well as riots demanding free and open airwaves, echoing the lyrical themes of the song.

== Track listing ==
No.	Title	Length
1.	"Radio"	4:37
2.	"Radio" (RMX by Twocolors)	5:00

== Charts ==
Chart (2019)	Peak position
Austria (Ö3 Austria Top 40)	13
Belgium (Ultratip Bubbling Under Flanders)	17
Czech Republic Singles Digital (ČNS IFPI)	36
Euro Digital Song Sales (Billboard)	11
Germany (GfK)	4
Hungary (Single Top 40)	4
Scotland Singles (Official Charts)	47
Slovakia Singles Digital (ČNS IFPI)	35
Sweden (Sverigetopplistan)	100
Switzerland (Schweizer Hitparade)	17
UK Rock & Metal (Official Charts)	9
US Hot Rock & Alternative Songs (Billboard)	27

== Certifications ==
Region	Certification	Certified units/sales
Austria (IFPI Austria)	Gold	15,000^{‡}
Germany (BVMI)	Gold	200,000^{‡}
Poland (ZPAV)	Gold	25,000^{‡}
^{‡} Sales+streaming figures based on certification alone.

== Release history ==
Region	Date	Format	Label
Various	26 April 2019	Download; streaming	Universal
