= Zeit (Rammstein album) =

- Cover photo by Bryan Adams showing the band at the Trudelturm in Berlin

Studio album by Rammstein
- Released: 29 April 2022
- Recorded: September 2020 – February 2021
- Studio: La Fabrique (Saint-Rémy-de-Provence)
- Genres: Neue Deutsche Härte; industrial metal; industrial rock
- Length: 44:06
- Label: Universal
- Producers: Olsen Involtini; Rammstein

Rammstein chronology
Untitled (2019)	Zeit (2022)	Live In Mexico City (2026)

Singles from Zeit
- 1. "Zeit" Released: 10 March 2022; 2. "Zick Zack" Released: 7 April 2022; 3. "Dicke Titten" Released: 27 May 2022; 4. "Angst" Released: 26 August 2022; 5. "Adieu" Released: 25 November 2022

Special Edition cover

Professional ratings
Aggregate scores
Source	Rating
Metacritic	81/100
Review scores
Source	Rating
AllMusic	4/5 stars
Blabbermouth.net	7.5/10
Clash	9/10
DIY	4.5/5 stars
The Guardian	3/5 stars
Kerrang!	4/5 stars
Metal Hammer	4/5 stars
musicOMH	4/5 stars
NME	4/5 stars
Sputnikmusic	3.8/5

Zeit (German pronunciation: [tsaɪt], "Time") is the eighth studio album by German Neue Deutsche Härte band Rammstein, released on 29 April 2022 through Universal Music. Produced by the band with Olsen Involtini, the album was unplanned and recorded as a result of the band's tour being postponed due to the COVID-19 pandemic. According to the band, the enforced lockdowns due to the pandemic spurred the band's creativity, resulting in spontaneous writing and recording sessions. Rammstein recorded the album in late 2020 and early 2021 at La Fabrique Studios in Saint-Rémy-de-Provence, France, where they recorded their previous album. The album's title track was released as the lead single on 10 March 2022.

== Background and recording ==
Following the release of their sixth studio album, Liebe ist für alle da (2009), Rammstein dedicated nearly a decade to touring and performing live at festivals, with band members Till Lindemann and Richard Kruspe releasing music with their respective side projects Lindemann and Emigrate during this period as well. Rammstein's untitled seventh studio album was released in May 2019, ending their lengthy recording hiatus. To support the album, the band embarked on their Stadium Tour. Kruspe originally predicted that the band would spend three to four years touring in support of the album. The band announced dates for two legs in Europe and one leg in North America. The first European leg concluded in August 2019, with the second leg having been originally due to begin in May 2020. However, after the COVID-19 pandemic began severely impacting both Europe and North America, resulting in lockdowns being enforced across both continents, the band delayed both remaining legs of the tour to 2021. They were both delayed once more to 2022.

During the initial COVID-19 lockdown in Germany, Rammstein began writing new music, leaving open the idea of recording a new album. The band chose to begin writing new music to fill the void created by the postponement of their tour. By September 2020, the band returned to La Fabrique Studios in Saint-Rémy-de-Provence, France, where they had recorded their untitled seventh studio album, to begin recording new material. Keyboardist Christian "Flake" Lorenz stated that the sessions were spontaneous and that the lockdown caused the band to "[have] more time to think of new things and less distraction". Recording of the album concluded by February 2021. In October 2021, a song from the album was premiered when shared with astronaut Thomas Pesquet while he was on board the International Space Station.

== Promotion and release ==
Rammstein began posting clips to their social media accounts on 8 March 2022, teasing forthcoming new material with the hashtag "#ZEITkommt". The band announced their eighth studio album Zeit on 10 March alongside the release of its lead single, the title track "Zeit", and the song's elaborate music video directed by Robert Gwisdek containing allegorical scenes about death and the passage of time.

On 25 March 2022, the band's website announced that 11 "Zeit capsules" had been placed in 11 different cities around the world. Each capsule contained a code. The fan who found any of the 11 capsules should enter the code to Rammstein's website, revealing to the world the title to one of the unreleased tracks. The fan would also receive two tickets to any Rammstein concert of their choice, as well as travel and accommodations for the aforementioned concert. The band began teasing the release of the album's second single, "Zick Zack", in early April. They opened a telephone hotline that provided the song's release date as well as portions of the song's instrumental and vocals. The song was released on 7 April 2022, accompanied by a music video. A CD release that came with a teen-style magazine designed after the music video was released on 14 April, as well as a standard 7-inch vinyl.

Zeit was released on 29 April 2022 through Universal Music, receiving both physical and digital releases. Physically, the album received both a standard and deluxe CD release, both housed as a digipak, as well as a double, heavyweight vinyl release. The album's release was preceded by a listening event, held at certain movie theaters around the world, on 28 April. The cover art for Zeit depicts the members of Rammstein walking down a staircase connected to the Trudelturm, a monument dedicated to aerial research, located at Aerodynamic Park in Adlershof, Berlin. The photograph used for the cover art was taken by Canadian musician Bryan Adams.

== Accolades ==
Publication	List	Rank
Loudwire (United States)	The 50 Best Rock + Metal Albums of 2022	–
Metal Hammer (United Kingdom)	The Best Metal Albums of 2022 So Far	–
Metal Hammer (United Kingdom)	The 50 Best Albums of 2022	5
Revolver	25 Best Albums of 2022	24

== Track listing ==
All tracks are written by Rammstein.

Zeit track listing
No.	Title	Length
1.	"Armee der Tristen" ("Army of the Dreary Ones")	3:25
2.	"Zeit" ("Time")	5:21
3.	"Schwarz" ("Black")	4:18
4.	"Giftig" ("Toxic")	3:08
5.	"Zick Zack" ("Snip Snip")	4:04
6.	"OK" ("Ohne Kondom" ["Without a Condom"])	4:03
7.	"Meine Tränen" ("My Tears")	3:57
8.	"Angst" ("Fear")	3:44
9.	"Dicke Titten" ("Big Tits")	3:38
10.	"Lügen" ("Lies")	3:49
11.	"Adieu" ("Farewell")	4:39
Total length:		44:06

== Personnel ==
Rammstein

- Till Lindemann – lead vocals
- Richard Kruspe – lead guitar, backing vocals
- Paul Landers – rhythm guitar, backing vocals
- Oliver Riedel – bass guitar
- Christian Lorenz – keyboards
- Christoph Schneider – drums

Technical personnel

- Florian Ammon – additional producer, engineer, editing
- Nando Bernaldo – keyboard technician
- Daniel Cayotte – studio assistant, technician
- Jens Dreesen – mastering
- Olsen Involtini – producer, mixer, recording engineer
- Svante Forsbäck – atmos mixer
- Rammstein – producer
- Rossi Rossberg – drum technician
- Sky van Hoff – additional producer, recording engineer, editing

Other personnel

- Bryan Adams – photography
- Büro Dirk Rudolph – artwork

== Charts ==
=== Weekly charts ===
Chart performance for Zeit
Chart (2022–2023)	Peak position
Australian Albums (ARIA)	3
Austrian Albums (Ö3 Austria)	1
Belgian Albums (Ultratop Flanders)	1
Belgian Albums (Ultratop Wallonia)	1
Canadian Albums (Billboard)	7
Czech Albums (ČNS IFPI)	1
Danish Albums (Hitlisten)	1
Dutch Albums (Album Top 100)	1
Finnish Albums (Suomen virallinen lista)	1
French Albums (SNEP)	1
German Albums (Offizielle Top 100)	1
Hungarian Albums (MAHASZ)	2
Icelandic Albums (Tónlistinn)	5
Irish Albums (IRMA)	20
Italian Albums (FIMI)	12
Japanese Hot Albums (Billboard Japan)	96
Japanese Albums (Oricon)	75
Lithuanian Albums (AGATA)	5
New Zealand Albums (RMNZ)	11
Norwegian Albums (VG-lista)	1
Polish Albums (ZPAV)	3
Portuguese Albums (AFP)	3
Scottish Albums (Official Charts)	1
Spanish Albums (PROMUSICAE)	4
Swedish Albums (Sverigetopplistan)	1
Swiss Albums (Schweizer Hitparade)	1
UK Albums (Official Charts)	3
UK Rock & Metal Albums (Official Charts)	1
US Billboard 200	15
US Top Hard Rock Albums (Billboard)	1
US Top Rock Albums (Billboard)	2
US World Albums (Billboard)	1

=== Year-end charts ===
2022 year-end chart performance for Zeit
Chart (2022)	Position
Austrian Albums (Ö3 Austria)	1
Belgian Albums (Ultratop Flanders)	6
Belgian Albums (Ultratop Wallonia)	18
Danish Albums (Hitlisten)	98
Dutch Albums (Album Top 100)	15
French Albums (SNEP)	69
German Albums (Offizielle Top 100)	1
Hungarian Albums (MAHASZ)	36
Icelandic Albums (Tónlistinn)	71
Polish Albums (ZPAV)	27
Portuguese Albums (AFP)	66
Spanish Albums (PROMUSICAE)	93
Swedish Albums (Sverigetopplistan)	23
Swiss Albums (Schweizer Hitparade)	2

2023 year-end chart performance for Zeit
Chart (2023)	Position
Austrian Albums (Ö3 Austria)	8
Belgian Albums (Ultratop Flanders)	57
Belgian Albums (Ultratop Wallonia)	149
German Albums (Offizielle Top 100)	15
Swiss Albums (Schweizer Hitparade)	24

2024 year-end chart performance of Zeit
Chart (2024)	Position
Austrian Albums (Ö3 Austria)	46
Belgian Albums (Ultratop Flanders)	123
German Albums (Offizielle Top 100)	82

== Certifications ==
Region	Certification	Certified units/sales
Austria (IFPI Austria)	Platinum	15,000^{‡}
Belgium (BRMA)	Gold	10,000^{‡}
Denmark (IFPI Danmark)	Gold	10,000^{‡}
France (SNEP)	Gold	50,000^{‡}
Germany (BVMI)	2× Platinum	400,000^{‡}
Hungary (MAHASZ)	Platinum	4,000^{‡}
Poland (ZPAV)	Platinum	20,000^{‡}
Switzerland (IFPI Switzerland)	Platinum	20,000^{‡}
^{‡} Sales+streaming figures based on certification alone.
