= Zeit (song) =

2022 song by Rammstein

Single by Rammstein

from the album Zeit
- B-side: "Zeit" (Ólafur Arnalds Remix); "Zeit" (Robot Koch Remix)
- Released: 10 March 2022
- Genre: Neue Deutsche Härte
- Length: 5:21
- Label: Universal
- Songwriters: Richard Kruspe; Paul Landers; Till Lindemann; Christian Lorenz; Oliver Riedel; Christoph Schneider
- Producers: Olsen Involtini; Rammstein

Rammstein singles chronology
"Ausländer" (2019)	"Zeit" (2022)	"Zick Zack" (2022)

Music video
- "Zeit" on YouTube

"Zeit" (German pronunciation: [tsaɪt], "Time") is a song by German Neue Deutsche Härte band Rammstein. It is the title track from their eighth studio album of the same name and released as the first single from it. The song became Rammstein's third No. 1 single in Germany after "Deutschland" in 2019. The track was also nominated for the 2022 Kerrang! Award for Best Single.

== Music video ==
The band began posting a video teaser trailer on 8 March on their website and social media platform. The song's music video was released on 10 March 2022 at 17:00 CET. It was directed by actor and musician Robert Gwisdek.

== Track listing ==
All tracks are written by Rammstein.

No.	Title	Length
1.	"Zeit"	5:21
2.	"Zeit" (RMX by Ólafur Arnalds)	3:54
3.	"Zeit" (RMX by Robot Koch)	4:43

== Charts ==
=== Weekly charts ===
Weekly chart performance for "Zeit"
Chart (2022)	Peak position
Austria (Ö3 Austria Top 40)	6
Czech Republic Singles Digital (ČNS IFPI)	48
Finland (Suomen virallinen lista)	17
Germany (GfK)	1
Global 200 (Billboard)	180
Hungary (Single Top 40)	12
Netherlands (Single Top 100)	96
Slovakia (Singles Digitál Top 100)	86
Sweden (Sverigetopplistan)	72
Switzerland (Schweizer Hitparade)	2
UK Rock & Metal (Official Charts)	29
US World Digital Song Sales (Billboard)	4

=== Year-end charts ===
2022 year-end chart performance for "Zeit"
Chart (2022)	Position
Germany (Official German Charts)	85

== Certifications ==
Region	Certification	Certified units/sales
Germany (BVMI)	Gold	300,000^{‡}
^{‡} Sales+streaming figures based on certification alone.
