= Kosmischer Läufer =

Compilation album by Martin Zeichnete (allegedly); Drew McFadyen (probably)
- Released: June 3, 2013
- Genre: Electronic; Krautrock
- Label: Unknown Capability Recordings (UCR)

Kosmischer Läufer: The Secret Cosmic Music of the East German Olympic Program 1972 – 83 is a collection of albums of electronic music in the Krautrock style, supposedly composed by the East German composer Martin Zeichnete as workout music for the GDR's athletes. Some sources have attributed it not to Zeichnete, who they suspect to be fictional, but to the Edinburgh-based musician Drew McFadyen, using the persona of Zeichnete as an alias.

== Albums ==
The collection currently has five total albums, one for each color of the olympic rings. The albums' Bandcamp pages and sleeve notes always have some information that gives more context to the "universe" of the album and the (most probably) fictional history of Martin Zeichnete.

=== Volume 1 ===
The first volume's limited edition vinyls bear a solid black color. The album was released on June 3, 2013. The volume's description says that it "should allow the average runner to complete a 5 kilometre run at a reasonable pace", with the additional information that 3-minute pieces are included, marking the beginning and the ending of the "program", with it being "written by Martin Zeichnete" and "used by the East German Olympians in the 1970s".

No.	Title	Length
1.	"Zeit zum Laufen 156"	2:56
2.	"Sandtrommel"	6:26
3.	"Die lange Gerade"	13:07
4.	"Tonband Laufspur"	6:32
5.	"Ein merkwürdiger Anschlag"	2:49
Total length:		31:55

=== Volume 2 ===
Volume two's limited edition vinyls bear a dark red color. The album was released on March 17, 2014. The volume's description states that this second release "takes a broader look at the scope of Martin Zeichnete's secret work for the East German Olympic Program", with the album compiling music from the start to the ending years of the project in 1983. A categorization of the tracks is also presented, dividing them into specific "training music" sections:

- 172 BPM running program (Tracks 1–4)
- Gymnastic floor exercise (Tracks 5–8)
- Figure skating long program (Tracks 9–10)

No.	Title	Length
1.	"Zeit zum Laufen 172"	3:13
2.	"Morgenröte"	9:51
3.	"Flucht aus dem Tal der Ahnungslosen"	10:13
4.	"Die Kapsel"	3:22
5.	"Die Liebellen"	1:29
6.	"Mausi Mausi"	1:30
7.	"Walzer der roten Katze"	1:34
8.	"Der Hörraum"	1:32
9.	"Für Kati"	3:53
10.	"Weltraumspaziergang"	4:13
Total length:		40:50

=== Volume 3 ===
The third installment of the series' limited edition vinyls bear a canary yellow color. The album was released on November 30, 2015.

This volume's description states that the album is divided between two sections: a 164 BPM running program between tracks 1 and 3 and a soundtrack to a "lost animated film UCR [Unknown Capability Recordings] obtained only a few months ago", spanning tracks 4 through 10. The movie is supposedly called "Traum von der goldenen Zukunft" ("Dream of the golden future"), an animated propaganda that goes over the story of two East German teenagers that dream about the 1984 Olympics. The entire synopsis of the movie is available in the album's page.

The running program is described as being "Zeichnete at his most hypnotic, particularly on the motorik, rolling 'Jenseits des Horizonts'". The program ends with the track "Für Seelenbinder", dedicated to the German communist and wrestler Werner Seelenbinder that was arrested and killed by the Nazi German authorities.

No.	Title	Length
1.	"Zeit zum Laufen 164"	2:54
2.	"Jenseits des Horizonts"	10:13
3.	"Für Seelenbinder"	4:14
4.	"Traum von der goldenen Zukunft (Theme)"	1:31
5.	"In der Stadt und auf dem Land"	2:16
6.	"Der Traum des Mädchens"	3:28
7.	"Der Traum des Jungen"	3:42
8.	"Unterwasser"	1:10
9.	"Ankunft im Stadion / Das Rennen"	2:30
10.	"Siegerehrung / Abschied von der Zukunft"	5:32
Total length:		37:30

=== Volume 4 ===
The fourth volume's limited edition vinyls bear a vibrant light blue color. The album was released on November 19, 2018.

The volume's page states that the work is divided between two categories: a 150 BPM running program (tracks 1–4) that are "taken from various years of the project" and a soundtrack to a film called "Der Weg" ("The Way") spanning tracks 5 through 9. The movie supposedly had the goal to mentally stimulate the athletes using alpha wave projection and "dream-machine-like devices". The work itself is subdivided in four "stages" ("Phase I" through "Phase IV"), with each stage detailing different scenes, spanning astronomical scenery, terrestrial landscapes and patriotic messages. The description ends mentioning that the film "has been lost to time", although it "lives on in Zeichnete's vibrant soundtrack". A detailed script of the movie is available in the album's page.

No.	Title	Length
1.	"Zeit zum Laufen 150"	3:20
2.	"Goldene Tage"	8:56
3.	"Lichtgeschwindigkeit"	6:27
4.	"Der Lechtturm am Ende der Zeit"	3:16
5.	"Der Weg (Introduction)"	3:43
6.	"Phase I - Forst"	3:11
7.	"Phase II - Das Meer"	4:17
8.	"Phase III - Heimat"	4:33
9.	"Phase IV - Morgen"	5:36
Total length:		43:19

=== Volume 5 ===
The fifth installment of the series' limited edition vinyls bear a vibrant neon green color. The album was released on February 3, 2023.

The album's page states that the volume is divided between two parts: a 180 BPM running program with it being subdivided in four sections and a personal project of Zeichnete called "Jahre der ruhigen Sonne" ("Years of The Quiet Sun"). This project is notably space-themed, caused by the "lifelong interest in the planets, the stars and the mysteries of the cosmos", product of Zeichnete's childhood visit to the Karl Schwarzschild Observatory.

No.	Title	Length
1.	"Zeit zum Laufen 180"	3:38
2.	"Der kosmische Strahl"	6:37
3.	"Schreibmaschine"	5:41
4.	"Im Herzen des Universums"	3:47
5.	"Die stille Sonne (Teil 1)"	2:30
6.	"Sonnenfleck I"	1:15
7.	"Nordlicht"	5:12
8.	"Sonnenfleck II"	1:15
9.	"Südlicht"	4:40
10.	"Sonnenfleck III"	1:02
11.	"Die stille Sonne (Teil 2)"	5:32
Total length:		41:09
