= Zick Zack =

- LP version cover

Single by Rammstein

from the album Zeit
- B-side: "Zick Zack" (Boys Noize RMX)
- Released: 7 April 2022
- Studio: La Fabrique (Saint-Rémy-de-Provence, France)
- Genre: Neue Deutsche Härte
- Length: 4:04
- Label: Universal
- Songwriters: Richard Kruspe; Paul Landers; Till Lindemann; Christian Lorenz; Oliver Riedel; Christoph Schneider
- Producers: Olsen Involtini; Rammstein

Rammstein singles chronology
"Zeit" (2022)	"Zick Zack" (2022)	"Dicke Titten" (2022)

Music video
- "Zick Zack" on YouTube

Alternative cover
- CD version cover

Zick Zack (German for 'Snip Snip' or 'Zig Zag') is a song by German industrial metal band Rammstein. It was released on 7 April 2022 as the second single from their eighth album, Zeit. The song became Rammstein's fourth No. 1 single in Germany after "Zeit".

== Content ==
"Zick Zack" is about cosmetic operations and the rising desire to need surgery in order to retain one's youth and to maintain an acceptable appearance as one ages.

== Music video ==
The video depicts the band members performing to a small audience of elderly fans, dressed in stereotypical '80s hair metal band costumes, performing the song, complete with bandaged showgirls, who act as the band's beauticians backstage. All the band members appear in character as having undergone various cosmetic surgeries, or using prosthetics to exaggerate their appearance, from Christoph Schneider wearing a toupée to hide his baldness, Paul Landers having dentures, Richard Kruspe wearing a silicone six pack, to Oliver Riedel tattooing a beard onto his face.

Till Lindemann's character appears heavily botoxed, and throughout the video, his face begins to sag as he performs the song, forcing him and Flake Lorenz's character to leave the stage. Lindemann goes to extreme measures, and attempts to literally piece his botox-filled face back together using a stapler and tape.

At the end after Till leaves the stage, the cat ate the liposuction, much to the horror of one woman.

The video was recorded in Teatr Sabat Małgorzaty Potockiej in Warsaw, Poland and in Tworkowski Hospital in Tworki, Poland.

== Promotion ==
As part of the promotion for the single, Rammstein issued a press release on April 1, 2022, where they announced that the band had invested in a beauty clinic, in the Mitte District of Berlin. In a now deleted post, the press statement read:

“We are happy to reveal a well-kept secret today and announce our early-stage investment in a cutting-edge company: The Zick Zack Beauty Clinic In Berlin...Rammstein are super-excited this project is finally going live. ‘Prettier, bigger, harder’ – become the best version of yourself! Appointments will be available soon!”

Social media posts, depicting the band as they looked in the music video for the song began being uploaded from April 3, 2022, promoting the Zick Zack beauty clinic, complete with fake phone number and false advertising slogans (actually lyrics from the song). The Music Video premiered at 18:00 CET on Rammstein's official website.

As further promotion, Rammstein released the CD Single with an exclusive, limited edition magazine that featured images of the band from the music video.

== Track listing ==
CD; 7" vinyl
No.	Title	Length
1.	"Zick Zack"	4:04
2.	"Zick Zack" (RMX by Boys Noize)	4:00

Digital download; Streaming
No.	Title	Length
1.	"Zick Zack"	4:04
2.	"Zick Zack" (RMX by Boys Noize)	4:00
3.	"Zick Zack" (RMX by Boys Noize (Instrumental))	4:00

== Charts ==
=== Weekly charts ===
Weekly chart performance for "Zick Zack"
Chart (2022)	Peak position
Austria (Ö3 Austria Top 40)	8
Czech Republic Singles Digital (ČNS IFPI)	41
Finland (Suomen virallinen lista)	20
Germany (GfK)	1
Hungary (Single Top 40)	13
Netherlands (Single Tip)	2
Slovakia (Singles Digitál Top 100)	97
Sweden (Sverigetopplistan)	62
Switzerland (Schweizer Hitparade)	11
UK Rock & Metal (Official Charts)	27
US World Digital Song Sales (Billboard)	4

=== Year-end charts ===
2022 year-end chart performance for "Zick Zack"
Chart (2022)	Position
Germany (Official German Charts)	84

== Certifications ==
Region	Certification	Certified units/sales
Austria (IFPI Austria)	Gold	15,000^{‡}
^{‡} Sales+streaming figures based on certification alone.
