= Deutschland (song) =

2019 song by Rammstein

- Single cover featuring actress Ruby Commey

Single by Rammstein

from the album Untitled
- B-side: "Deutschland" (Richard Z. Kruspe Remix)
- Released: 28 March 2019
- Recorded: 2018
- Studio: La Fabrique (Saint-Rémy-de-Provence, France)
- Length: 5:22
- Label: Universal
- Songwriters: Richard Kruspe; Paul Landers; Till Lindemann; Christian Lorenz; Oliver Riedel; Christoph Schneider
- Producers: Olsen Involtini; Rammstein

Rammstein singles chronology
| "Mein Herz brennt" (2012) | "Deutschland" (2019) | "Radio" (2019) |

Music video
- "Deutschland" on YouTube

"Deutschland" (German pronunciation: [ˈdɔʏtʃlant]; "Germany") is a song by German Neue Deutsche Härte band Rammstein. Released as the lead single from their untitled seventh studio album on 28 March 2019, it was their first new music since the song "Mein Land" in 2011.

The song became Rammstein's second No. 1 single in Germany after "Pussy" in 2009. It was also a No. 1 hit in Hungary and Switzerland, reached the top 5 in Austria and Finland, and was nominated for the 2019 Kerrang! Award for Best Single.

== Music video ==
The song's music video was directed by Specter Berlin and was released on 28 March 2019 at 18:00 CET, following a 35-second teaser trailer on 26 March. The lengthy music video sparked controversy; its dark, violent, and macabre style—typical of the band's aesthetic—features various events from German history, including Roman times, the Battle of the Teutoburg Forest, the Middle Ages, witch hunting, the November Revolution, the Golden Twenties, Nazi book burnings, the Hindenburg disaster, the First and Second World Wars, the Holocaust, the Weimar Republic, the Red Army Faction, and the division of the country into West and East Germany; it also features science fiction scenes set in outer space, cannibalism in which people eat Germania, the personification of Germany, and a bank robbery featuring lead singer Till Lindemann crossdressing as Ulrike Meinhof. The Afro-German actress Ruby Commey appears as Germania throughout the video.

The ending credits feature a piano version of the band's 2001 single "Sonne" performed by Clemens Pötzsch featured on the album XXI - Klavier. The introduction features the song called "The Beast" from the Sicario soundtrack by Jóhann Jóhannsson.

== Track listing ==
| No. | Title | Length |
|---|---|---|
| 1. | "Deutschland" | 5:23 |
| 2. | "Deutschland" (RMX by Richard Z. Kruspe) | 5:46 |

== Charts ==
=== Weekly charts ===
Weekly chart performance for "Deutschland"
| Chart (2019) | Peak position |
|---|---|
| Australia Digital Tracks (ARIA) | 39 |
| Austria (Ö3 Austria Top 40) | 4 |
| Belgium (Ultratop 50 Flanders) | 23 |
| Belgium (Ultratip Bubbling Under Wallonia) | 23 |
| CIS Airplay (TopHit) | 4 |
| Czech Republic Singles Digital (ČNS IFPI) | 11 |
| Estonia (Eesti Tipp-40) | 20 |
| Euro Digital Song Sales (Billboard) | 1 |
| Finland (Suomen virallinen lista) | 4 |
| France (SNEP) | 100 |
| France (SNEP Sales Chart) | 2 |
| Germany (GfK) | 1 |
| Hungary (Single Top 40) | 1 |
| Hungary (Stream Top 40) | 11 |
| Ireland (IRMA) | 96 |
| Latvia (LAIPA) | 13 |
| Lithuania (AGATA) | 36 |
| Mexico Ingles Airplay (Billboard) | 34 |
| Netherlands (Single Top 100) | 74 |
| New Zealand Hot Singles (RMNZ) | 27 |
| Russia Streaming (TopHit) | 5 |
| Scotland Singles (Official Charts) | 29 |
| Slovakia Singles Digital (ČNS IFPI) | 20 |
| Sweden (Sverigetopplistan) | 44 |
| Switzerland (Schweizer Hitparade) | 1 |
| UK Singles (Official Charts) | 98 |
| UK Rock & Metal (Official Charts) | 4 |
| Ukraine Streaming (TopHit) | 13 |
| US Digital Song Sales (Billboard) | 43 |
| US Hot Rock & Alternative Songs (Billboard) | 14 |

2023 weekly chart performance for "Deutschland"
| Chart (2023) | Peak position |
|---|---|
| Lithuania (AGATA) | 20 |

=== Year-end charts ===
| Chart (2019) | Position |
|---|---|
| Germany (Official German Charts) | 20 |
| Hungary (Single Top 40) | 23 |
| Switzerland (Schweizer Hitparade) | 86 |

== Certifications ==
| Region | Certification | Certified units/sales |
|---|---|---|
| Austria (IFPI Austria) | Platinum | 30,000^{‡} |
| Brazil (Pro-Música Brasil) | Platinum | 40,000^{‡} |
| Denmark (IFPI Danmark) | Platinum | 90,000^{‡} |
| France (SNEP) | Platinum | 200,000^{‡} |
| Germany (BVMI) | 3× Gold | 600,000^{‡} |
| New Zealand (RMNZ) | Gold | 15,000^{‡} |
| Poland (ZPAV) | 2× Platinum | 100,000^{‡} |
| Spain (Promusicae) | Gold | 30,000^{‡} |
| United Kingdom (BPI) | Silver | 200,000^{‡} |
Streaming
| Sweden (GLF) | Gold | 4,000,000^{†} |
^{‡} Sales+streaming figures based on certification alone.^{†} Streaming-only figures based on certification alone.

== Release history ==
| Region | Date | Format | Label | Catalogue number | Ref. |
|---|---|---|---|---|---|
| Various | 28 March 2019 | Download; streaming | Universal | —N/a | |
| Europe | 12 April 2019 | 7-inch | Universal | 7761888 | |
| Europe | 12 April 2019 | CD | Universal | 7755354 | |
| North America | 30 April 2019 | 7-inch | Universal | TBA | |
