= Rammstein in Amerika =

2015 concert film by Rammstein

Video by Rammstein
- Released: 25 September 2015
- Recorded: 11 December 2010
- Venue: Madison Square Garden (New York City)
- Genres: Neue Deutsche Härte; industrial metal
- Length: 244:00 (2 discs)
- Label: Universal
- Directors: Matthew Amos; Laura Vallis
- Producer: Jacob Hellner

Rammstein chronology
Made in Germany 1995–2011 (2011)	Rammstein in Amerika (2015)	Rammstein: Paris (2017)

Rammstein in Amerika is the third concert film by German Neue Deutsche Härte band Rammstein. It documents the sold-out show the band played at Madison Square Garden in New York City on 11 December 2010. It also contains two documentaries, regarding the band's history with the United States, and the making of the album Liebe ist für alle da. It was released worldwide on 25 September 2015.

== Track listing ==
Disc one - Madison Square Garden, New York City, 11 December 2010
No.	Title	Length
1.	"Rammlied ("Ramm-song")"
2.	"B******** ("Bückstabü, a made up word which means whatever the listener wants it to mean")"
3.	"Waidmanns Heil ("Huntsman's Salute")"
4.	"Keine Lust ("No Desire")"
5.	"Weißes Fleisch ("White Flesh")"
6.	"Feuer frei! ("Open Fire!")"
7.	"Wiener Blut ("Viennese Blood")"
8.	"Frühling in Paris ("Springtime in Paris")"
9.	"Ich tu dir weh ("I Hurt You")"
10.	"Du riechst so gut ("You Smell So Good")"
11.	"Benzin ("Petrol")"
12.	"Links 2-3-4 ("Left 2 3 4")"
13.	"Du hast ("You Have")"
14.	"Pussy"
15.	"Sonne ("Sun")"
16.	"Haifisch ("Shark")"
17.	"Ich will ("I Want")"
18.	"Engel ("Angel")"
Total length:		101:00

Disc two
No.	Title	Length
1.	""Rammstein in Amerika""	122:00
2.	""Making of the Album Liebe ist für alle da"	21:00
Total length:		143:00

== Charts ==
Chart (2015)	Peak position
Hungarian Albums (MAHASZ)	23

== Certifications ==
Region	Certification	Certified units/sales
Germany (BVMI)	2× Platinum	100,000^{^}
^{^} Shipments figures based on certification alone.
