= Made in Germany 1995–2011 =

- Oliver Riedel cover

Greatest hits album by Rammstein
- Released: 2 December 2011
- Recorded: 1995–2011
- Genres: Neue Deutsche Härte; industrial metal
- Length: 65:30 (CD 1); 80:29 (CD 2)
- Labels: Universal; Vertigo Berlin; Nippon Columbia
- Producers: Jacob Hellner; Rammstein

Rammstein chronology
Liebe ist für alle da (2009)	Made in Germany 1995–2011 (2011)	Rammstein in Amerika (2015)

Singles from Made in Germany 1995–2011
- 1. "Mein Land" Released: 14 November 2011; 2. "Mein Herz brennt" Released: 14 December 2012

Professional ratings
Aggregate scores
Source	Rating
Metacritic	(74/100)
Review scores
Source	Rating
411Mania	(7.5/10)
About.com	4.5/5 stars
AllMusic	AllMusic review
The Austin Chronicle	3/5 stars
Consequence of Sound	4/5 stars
PopMatters	7/10 stars
Sea of Tranquility	4/5 stars

Made in Germany 1995–2011 is a greatest hits album by the German band Rammstein, released in December 2011. It contains 15 previously released tracks, as well as one new track, "Mein Land". All of the older tracks have been remastered for the release. The album features six different covers, depicting each of the band members' life masks. The compilation is available in three different editions: the Standard Edition (1CD), the Special Edition (2CD), and the Super Deluxe Edition (2CD + 3DVD).

== Track listing ==
All tracks are written by Rammstein.

No.	Title	Album	Length
1.	"Engel" (Angel)	Sehnsucht	4:23
2.	"Links 2-3-4" (Left 2-3-4)	Mutter	3:40
3.	"Keine Lust" (No Desire)	Reise, Reise	3:42
4.	"Mein Teil" (My Part)	Reise, Reise	4:38
5.	"Du hast" (You Have)	Sehnsucht	3:54
6.	"Du riechst so gut" (You Smell So Good)	Herzeleid	4:32
7.	"Ich will" (I Want)	Mutter	3:39
8.	"Mein Herz brennt" (My Heart Burns)	Mutter	4:41
9.	"Mutter" (Mother)	Mutter	4:31
10.	"Pussy"	Liebe ist für alle da	3:58
11.	"Rosenrot" (Rose-red)	Rosenrot	3:52
12.	"Haifisch" (Shark)	Liebe ist für alle da	3:42
13.	"Amerika" (America)	Reise, Reise	3:47
14.	"Sonne" (Sun)	Mutter	4:07
15.	"Ohne dich" (Without You)	Reise, Reise	4:31
16.	"Mein Land" (My Country)	Previously unreleased	3:53
Total length:			65:30

Best of Remixes
No.	Title	Length
1.	"Du riechst so gut '98" (Faith No More Remix)	1:58
2.	"Du hast" (Jacob Hellner Remix)	6:42
3.	"Stripped" (Johan Edlund Remix)	4:22
4.	"Sonne" (Clawfinger Remix)	4:09
5.	"Links 2-3-4" (WestBam Remix)	3:40
6.	"Mutter" (Sono Remix)	7:21
7.	"Feuer frei!" (Junkie XL Remix)	4:10
8.	"Mein Teil" (Pet Shop Boys Remix)	4:04
9.	"Amerika" (Olsen Involtini Remix)	3:15
10.	"Ohne dich" (Laibach Remix)	3:58
11.	"Keine Lust" (Black Strobe Remix)	7:07
12.	"Benzin" (Meshuggah Remix)	5:05
13.	"Rosenrot" (Northern Lite Remix)	4:46
14.	"Pussy" (Scooter Remix)	4:53
15.	"Rammlied" (Devin Townsend Remix)	5:06
16.	"Ich tu dir weh" (Fukkk Offf Remix)	6:08
17.	"Haifisch" (Hurts Remix)	3:45
Total length:		80:29

DVD 1
No.	Title	Album	Length
1.	"Du riechst so gut" (music video)	Herzeleid
2.	"Du riechst so gut" (making of)
3.	"Seemann" (music video)	Herzeleid
4.	"Seemann" (making of)
5.	"Rammstein" (music video)	Herzeleid
6.	"Rammstein" (making of)
7.	"Engel" (music video)	Sehnsucht
8.	"Engel" (making of)
9.	"Du hast" (music video)	Sehnsucht
10.	"Du hast" (making of)
11.	"Du riechst so gut '98" (music video)	"Du riechst so gut '98"
12.	"Du riechst so gut '98" (making of)
13.	"Stripped" (music video)	For the Masses
14.	"Stripped" (making of)

DVD 2
No.	Title	Album	Length
1.	"Sonne" (music video)	Mutter
2.	"Sonne" (making of)
3.	"Links 2-3-4" (music video)	Mutter
4.	"Links 2-3-4" (making of)
5.	"Ich will" (music video)	Mutter
6.	"Ich will" (making of)
7.	"Mutter" (music video)	Mutter
8.	"Mutter" (making of)
9.	"Feuer frei!" (music video)	Mutter
10.	"Feuer frei!" (making of)
11.	"Mein Teil" (music video)	Reise, Reise
12.	"Mein Teil" (making of)
13.	"Amerika" (music video)	Reise, Reise
14.	"Amerika" (making of)
15.	"Ohne dich" (music video)	Reise, Reise
16.	"Ohne dich" (making of)
17.	"Keine Lust" (music video)	Reise, Reise
18.	"Keine Lust" (making of)

DVD 3
No.	Title	Album	Length
1.	"Benzin" (music video)	Rosenrot
2.	"Benzin" (making of)
3.	"Rosenrot" (music video)	Rosenrot
4.	"Rosenrot" (making of)
5.	"Mann gegen Mann" (music video)	Rosenrot
6.	"Mann gegen Mann" (making of)
7.	"Pussy" (music video)	Liebe ist für alle da
8.	"Pussy" (making of)
9.	"Ich tu dir weh" (music video)	Liebe ist für alle da
10.	"Ich tu dir weh" (making of)
11.	"Haifisch" (music video)	Liebe ist für alle da
12.	"Haifisch" (making of)
13.	"Mein Land" (music video)	Made in Germany 1995–2011
14.	"Mein Land" (making of)

== Personnel ==
Rammstein

- Till Lindemann – lead vocals
- Richard Kruspe – lead guitar, backing vocals
- Paul H. Landers – rhythm guitar, backing vocals
- Oliver "Ollie" Riedel – bass guitar
- Christoph "Doom" Schneider – drums, percussion
- Christian "Flake" Lorenz – keyboards, samples

Additional personnel

- Bobo – Additional vocals on "Engel"
- Sven Helbig – choir arrangements (track 4)
- Dresdner Kammerchor – choir (tracks 4, 13), conducted by Andreas Pabst
- Juan Sabino – sound engineer (tracks 1,8,10)
- Olsen Involtini – string arrangements (tracks 8, 9, 15)
- Bärbel Bühler – oboe (track 15)
- Köpenicker Zupforchester – mandolin (track 15)

== Charts ==
=== Weekly charts ===
Chart (2011–2012)	Peak position
Austrian Albums (Ö3 Austria)	2
Belgian Albums (Ultratop Flanders)	6
Belgian Albums (Ultratop Wallonia)	30
Danish Albums (Hitlisten)	6
Dutch Albums (Album Top 100)	18
Finnish Albums (Suomen virallinen lista)	12
French Albums (SNEP)	42
German Albums (Offizielle Top 100)	1
Italian Albums (FIMI)	96
Hungarian Albums (MAHASZ)	36
Irish Albums (IRMA)	59
New Zealand Albums (RMNZ)	36
Norwegian Albums (VG-lista)	4
Polish Albums (OLiS)	7
Russian Albums (Lenta)	1
Scottish Albums (Official Charts)	81
Spanish Albums (Promusicae)	55
Swedish Albums (Sverigetopplistan)	1
Swiss Albums (Schweizer Hitparade)	5
UK Albums (Official Charts)	94
US Independent Albums (Billboard)	15
US Top Rock Albums (Billboard)	29

=== Year-end charts ===
Chart (2011)	Position
Austrian Albums (Ö3 Austria)	61
Danish Albums (Hitlisten)	40
German Albums (Offizielle Top 100)	16
Polish Albums (ZPAV)	18
Chart (2012)	Position
Austrian Albums (Ö3 Austria)	57
Belgian Albums (Ultratop Flanders)	43
German Albums (Offizielle Top 100)	57
Russian Albums (Lenta)	13
Swedish Albums (Sverigetopplistan)	58
Swiss Albums (Schweizer Hitparade)	62
Chart (2013)	Position
Belgian Albums (Ultratop Flanders)	183
Chart (2016)	Position
Belgian Albums (Ultratop Flanders)	109
Chart (2017)	Position
Belgian Albums (Ultratop Flanders)	181
Chart (2019)	Position
Belgian Albums (Ultratop Flanders)	195

== Certifications ==
Region	Certification	Certified units/sales
Austria (IFPI Austria)	Gold	10,000^{*}
Belgium (BRMA)	Gold	15,000^{*}
Denmark (IFPI Danmark)	Platinum	20,000^{‡}
Germany (BVMI)	5× Gold	500,000^{‡}
Poland (ZPAV)	Platinum	20,000^{*}
Russia (NFPF)	Gold	5,000^{*}
United Kingdom (BPI)	Silver	60,000^{‡}
^{*} Sales figures based on certification alone.^{‡} Sales+streaming figures based on certification alone.
