= XXI Klavier =

2015 piano tribute album by Clemens Pötzsch

Klavier

Studio album by Rammstein
- Released: 18 December 2015
- Length: 52:43
- Label: DGC

Klavier also known as XXI – Klavier is a tribute album by pianist Clemens Pötzsch, released on December 18, 2015. The album consists entirely of piano interpretations of songs by the German band Rammstein.

The album was released as a companion to a sheet music book of the same name, marking the band's 21st anniversary. It features 13 songs from the band's history, rearranged for classical piano and vocals.

The album was produced by rhythm guitarist Paul Landers and Sven Helbig, with arrangements by Helbig, Clemens Pötzsch, Lars Kutschke, and Malte Rogacki. The tracks were performed for the CD by pianist Clemens Pötzsch. All of the pieces are instrumental.

== Track listing ==
1. "Frühling in Paris" – 4:09
2. "Feuer und Waßer" – 3:53
3. "Nebel" – 4:34
4. "Sonne" – 3:53
5. "Klavier" – 4:03
6. "Wilder Wein" – 3:31
7. "Ohne dich" – 4:31
8. "Ein Lied" – 3:41
9. "Roter Sand" – 3:16
10. "Engel" – 4:16
11. "Seemann" – 4:35
12. "Donaukinder" – 3:54
13. "Mein Herz brennt" – 4:32
