= Puss =

Puss or Püss may refer to:

== Arts, entertainment, and media ==
- Puss (magazine), Swedish magazine published between 1968 and 1973
- Puss (film), a Swedish film dated 2010
- "Puss" (song), a noise rock song dated 1992
- Tom Puss, a fictional anthropomorphic cat
- Puss in Boots, a European fairytale about a cat

== Other uses ==
- Puss Milroy (1887–1916), Scottish rugby union player
- Lars Püss (born 1966), Swedish politician
- Puss, face or facial expression, as in sour puss
- Puss or pussycat, a slang term for the domestic cat

== See also ==
- Pus (disambiguation)
- Pussy (disambiguation)
- Puss in Boots (disambiguation)
- Puss Moth (disambiguation)
