= Pussy (disambiguation) =

Pussy is an English-language word used as slang, euphemism, and vulgarity. Common referents include:

- Cat
- Female genitalia
- Coward

Pussy may also refer to:

== Arts and entertainment ==
=== Characters ===
- Big Pussy Bonpensiero, on the TV series The Sopranos
- Pussy Galore, in the James Bond novel and film Goldfinger

=== Music ===
- "Pussy" (Iggy Azalea song), 2011
- "Pussy" (Latto song), 2022
- "Pussy" (Lords of Acid song), 1998
- "Pussy" (Rammstein song), 2009
- "My Girl's Pussy", or "Pussy!", a song by Harry Roy and His Bat Club Boys, 1931
- "Pussy", a song by Alaska Thunderfuck from Anus, 2015
- "Pussy", a song by Bad Gyal from Warm Up, 2021
- "Pussy", a song by Dark Polo Gang and Tony Effe; an Italian number-one hit of 2020
- "Pussy", a song by Ty Dolla Sign from Campaign, 2016
- "Pussy", a song by Young Thug from So Much Fun, 2019
- "Pussy (Real Good)", a song by Jacki-O from Poe Little Rich Girl, 2004

== People ==
- Jeanne-Justine Fouqueau de Pussy (1786–1863), French author
- Pussy Jones (1871–1940), Welsh rugby union player
- Pussy Tebeau (1870–1950), American baseball player
- Pussy Tourette (21st century), American drag queen

== Other uses ==
- Pussy, Savoie, a village in the commune of La Léchère, Savoie département, France
- Pussy (energy drink), a British soft drink
- Pussy (horse) (1831–after 1848), a Thoroughbred racehorse that won the 1834 Epsom Oaks
- Pussy, containing or resembling pus

== See also ==
- Puss (disambiguation)
- Pussycat (disambiguation)
