= Schloss Marquardt =

Manor in Potsdam, Brandenburg state, Germany

Coordinates: 52°27′29″N 12°57′48″E

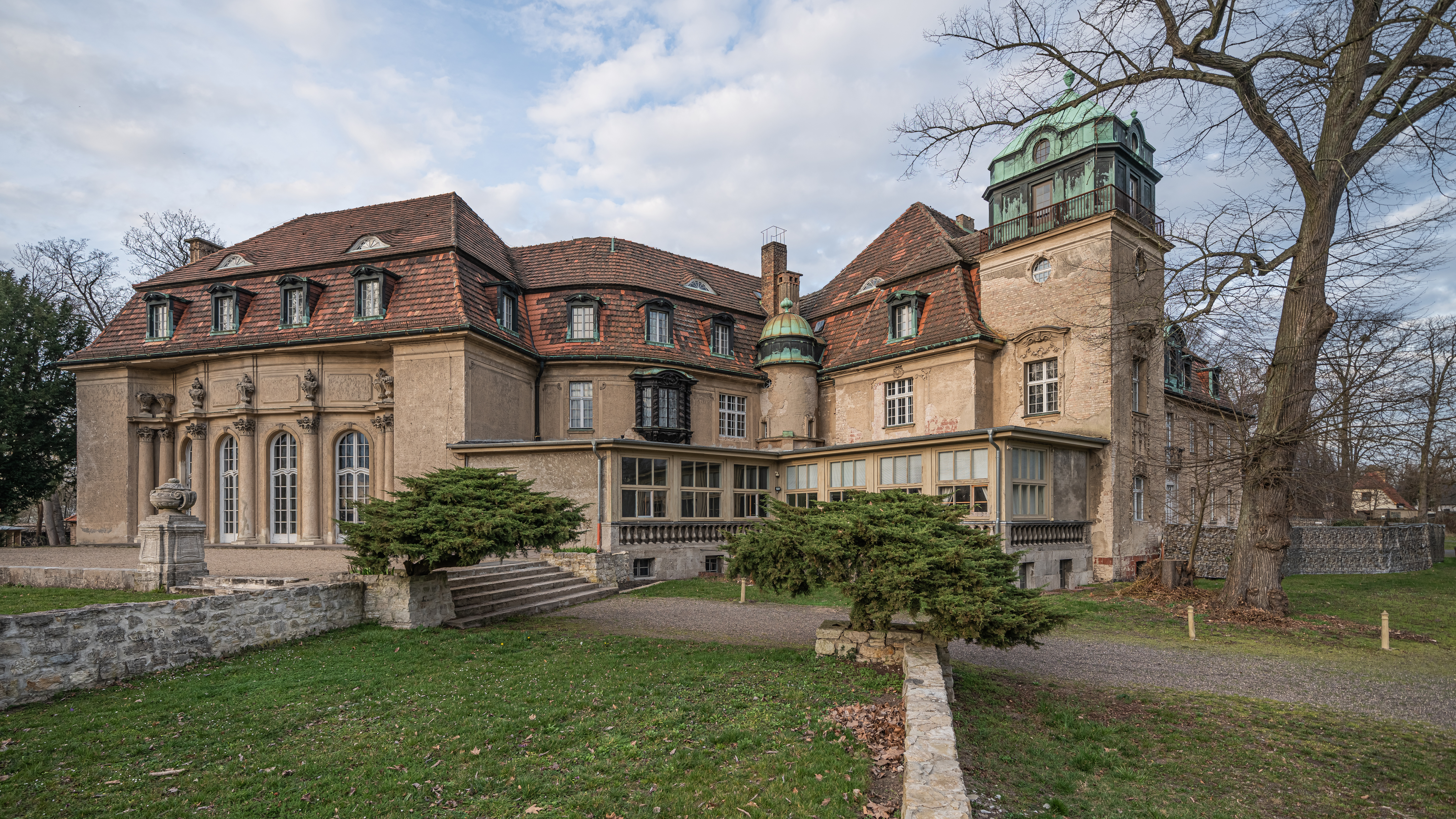
Schloss Marquardt in 2024

Schloss Marquardt is a palace located 15 km northwest from downtown Potsdam, in the neighbourhood Marquardt. The palace has been used for different purposes, such as summer or winter residence of nobility and upper-class people, hotel, hospital, and university. Currently the building is used for events, such as weddings and gastronomy, and also as a filming location (notably for Spencer, The Book Thief) and the Haifisch music video.
