= Pussycat =

Pussycat(s) or Pussy Cat(s) may refer to:

- Cat, a domestic feline pet

== Music ==
=== Bands ===
- Pussycat (band), a Dutch country and pop group
- The Pussycats, a 1960s Norwegian rock band
- The Pussycats, a group signed to Kama Sutra Records

=== Albums ===
- Pussycat (album), by Juliana Hatfield, 2017
- Pussy Cats, by Harry Nilsson, 1974
- "Pussy Cats" Starring the Walkmen, a cover of the 1974 album by the Walkmen, 2006

=== Songs ===
- "Pussy Cat", a song by the Ames Brothers, 1958
- "Pussycat", a song by Missy Elliott from Under Construction
- "Pussycat" (Wyclef Jean song), 2002

== Other uses ==
- Philip Gudthaykudthay (died 2022), an Australian artist, known as Pussycat
- Pussycat, one of Catwoman's minions, played by Lesley Gore, on the 1967 TV series Batman
- Pussycat, a robot in the TV series Robot Wars
- Pussycat (comics), a 1960s fictional character in a comic
- "Pussy Cat Pussy Cat", an English nursery rhyme
- Pussycat Theaters, a chain of adult movie theaters in California, US

== See also ==
- Cat (disambiguation)
- Josie and the Pussycats, a fictional girl group
- Pussy (disambiguation)
- The Pussycat Dolls, an American group
- "What's New Pussycat?" (song), a 1965 song by Tom Jones
