= Pus (disambiguation) =

Pus is an exudate produced by vertebrates during inflammatory pyogenic bacterial infections.

Pus or PUS may also refer to:

- -pus, a taxonomic suffix meaning "foot"
- Pus (film), a 2010 Turkish film
- pus, the ISO 639-2 code for the Pashto language
- Gimhae International Airport, Busan, South Korea, IATA code
- Permanent Under-Secretary in the UK government
- Polyteknikkojen Urheiluseura, now Aalto University Sports Club, Finland

== See also ==
- Puss (disambiguation)
