= Mein Land =

2011 song by Rammstein

Single by Rammstein

from the album Made in Germany 1995–2011
- Released: 11 November 2011
- Genre: Neue Deutsche Härte
- Length: 3:53
- Label: Universal
- Songwriters: Richard Kruspe; Paul Landers; Till Lindemann; Christian Lorenz; Oliver Riedel; Christoph Schneider
- Producers: Jacob Hellner; Rammstein

Rammstein singles chronology
"Haifisch" (2010)	"Mein Land" (2011)	"Mein Herz brennt" (2012)

Music video
- "Mein Land" on YouTube

Audio sample
- "Mein Land": file; help

"Mein Land" (German for "My country") is a song by German Neue Deutsche Härte band Rammstein. It was released as a single from their greatest hits album, Made in Germany 1995–2011, on 11 November 2011 in Germany, Austria and Switzerland and internationally on 14 November. The cover art is based on The Beach Boys' Surfer Girl album cover.

== Music video ==
The music video for "Mein Land" was filmed on 23 May 2011 at Sycamore Cove State Beach in Malibu, California. It was directed by Jonas Åkerlund and depicts band members in casual 1960s beach attire. It shows them having a party while words in Beach Boys-type font describe the beach party. Near the end of the video, it cuts to 2012 and shows the band performing at the same beach, but dressed up industrially with flames shooting from various things around the stage. During the stage performance, each band member wears corpse paint. The music video was released on 11 November 2011.

== Track listing ==
All songs by Rammstein.

CD single

1. "Mein Land" ("My Land") - 3:53
2. "Vergiss uns nicht" ("Don't forget us") - 4:10
3. "My Country" (The BossHoss) - 4:08
4. "Mein Land" (Mogwai Mix) - 4:30

7" vinyl

1. "Mein Land" - 3:53
2. "Vergiss uns nicht" - 4:10

== Charts ==
Chart (2011)	Peak position
Austria (Ö3 Austria Top 40)	9
Belgium (Ultratop 50 Flanders)	28
Finland (Suomen virallinen lista)	14
Germany (GfK)	5
Netherlands (Single Top 100)	88
Switzerland (Schweizer Hitparade)	21
UK Rock & Metal (OCC)	10
