= Mein Herz brennt =

2012 single by Rammstein

Single by Rammstein

from the album Mutter / Made in Germany 1995–2011
- B-side: "Gib mir deine Augen"; remixes
- Released: 7 December 2012 (piano version); 14 December 2012 (original version)
- Recorded: May and June 2000
- Studio: Studio Miraval, Correns, France
- Genre: Neue Deutsche Härte; symphonic metal
- Length: 4:39
- Label: Universal
- Songwriters: Richard Kruspe; Paul Landers; Till Lindemann; Christian Lorenz; Oliver Riedel; Christoph Schneider
- Producers: Jacob Hellner; Rammstein

Rammstein singles chronology
"Mein Land" (2011)	"Mein Herz brennt" (2012)	"Deutschland" (2019)

Music video
- "Mein Herz brennt" on YouTube

"Mein Herz brennt" (German for "My heart burns") is a song by German Neue Deutsche Härte band Rammstein. The song first appeared as the opening track to the band's third studio album, Mutter (2001), and was used as the opening track for concerts during that era. It also appeared on the band's greatest hits album Made in Germany 1995–2011 (2011), being the only song on the album that, at the time of release, had not been released as a single or had a music video. The song was released as a single in 2012 to promote the then-upcoming video collection Videos 1995–2012. A piano version of the song was released as a single on 7 December 2012.

The song's lyrics involve a narrator describing the terrors of nightmares. The opening line of the song's intro and chorus (Nun, liebe Kinder, gebt fein Acht. Ich habe euch etwas mitgebracht, meaning "Now, dear children, pay attention. I have brought something for you") is taken from the German children's TV show Sandmännchen ("Mr Sandman"), which provided children with a bedtime story. The song's narrator appears as a darker version of the character.

The Swedish dark symphonic metal band ELEINE released a cover version of the song on November 1, 2019.

== Music videos ==
Two separate videos were produced for "Mein Herz brennt", one for the original version and another for the piano version. Both were filmed in the main bathroom of Beelitz-Heilstätten, and were directed by Zoran Bihać, who had previously directed the video for "Links 2-3-4", then later on directed the videos for "Mein Teil" and "Rosenrot". Bihać described the relationship between the two videos as 'yin and yang', with the piano version being the latter.

=== Piano version ===
The music video for the piano version of the song premiered on 7 December 2012 on Vimeo. The video shows lead singer Till Lindemann wearing a black dress and fishnets, while also sporting black and white face paint. The entire bathroom is light red, and in the centre is a T-shaped pool emitting light. The video consists of close-ups on Lindemann singing from behind the pool, until the second verse begins, where he begins to walk to the pool's foot. As the song closes, Lindemann walks into it and its light fades. The music video for the piano version is the first video since "Mutter" to show only Lindemann.

=== Original version ===
The video for the original version was released on 14 December 2012. In it, the character of the Sandman is played by Melanie Gaydos. She first appears to a sleeping Richard Kruspe, triggering nightmares and sending him into a state of agony. Meanwhile, Till Lindemann terrorizes children in an orphanage (represented by Beelitz-Heilstätten).

The music video was filmed from December 17–19, 2011 in the Beelitz Heilstätten. It was directed by Spanish photographer and director Eugeno Recuno, who shot the album cover for Liebe ist für alle da, and was set to be released in early 2012. However, the band was unsatisfied with the result and revisited the same area on June 12, 2012, to shoot extra scenes, with Zoran Bihać directing. The final video contains scenes from the original video with new ones where the full band is performing by the pool that is also present in the piano version of the song.

The original version of the video was later released on Recueno's website in March 2013.

== Track listing ==
CD
No.	Title	Length
1.	"Mein Herz brennt" (Piano Version)	4:31
2.	"Gib mir deine Augen"	3:44
3.	"Mein Herz brennt" (Video Edit)	4:18
4.	"Mein Herz brennt" (Boys Noize RMX)	5:00
5.	"Mein Herz brennt" (Piano Instrumental)	4:31

Digital download
No.	Title	Length
1.	"Mein Herz brennt" (Piano Version)	4:31
2.	"Gib mir deine Augen"	3:44
3.	"Mein Herz brennt" (Video Edit)	4:18
4.	"Mein Herz brennt" (Boys Noize RMX)	5:00
5.	"Mein Herz brennt" (Piano Instrumental)	4:31
6.	"Mein Herz brennt" (Turntablerocker RMX)	5:23

7"
No.	Title	Length
1.	"Mein Herz brennt" (Piano Version)	4:31
2.	"Gib mir deine Augen"	3:44

== Release history ==
- 7 December 2012 – Germany, Austria, Finland, Sweden, iTunes (international)
- 10 December 2012 – France, UK
- 11 December 2012 – Spain, US, Canada

(source:)

== Charts ==
Chart (2012)	Peak position
Austria (Ö3 Austria Top 40)	31
Germany (GfK)	7
Hungary (Single Top 40)	7
UK Rock & Metal (OCC)	8

== Certifications ==
Region	Certification	Certified units/sales
Germany (BVMI)	Gold	300,000^{‡}
^{‡} Sales+streaming figures based on certification alone.

== In popular culture ==
The song plays a prominent role in the opening scene of Lukas Moodysson's acclaimed 2002 film Lilya 4-ever, in which the title character is depicted in media res, bruised and beaten.
