= Puss moth =

Puss moth may refer to:

- Megalopyge opercularis, a North American moth
- Cerura vinula, a European moth
- de Havilland Puss Moth, an aeroplane built between 1929 and 1933
