= Rammstein =

German metal band

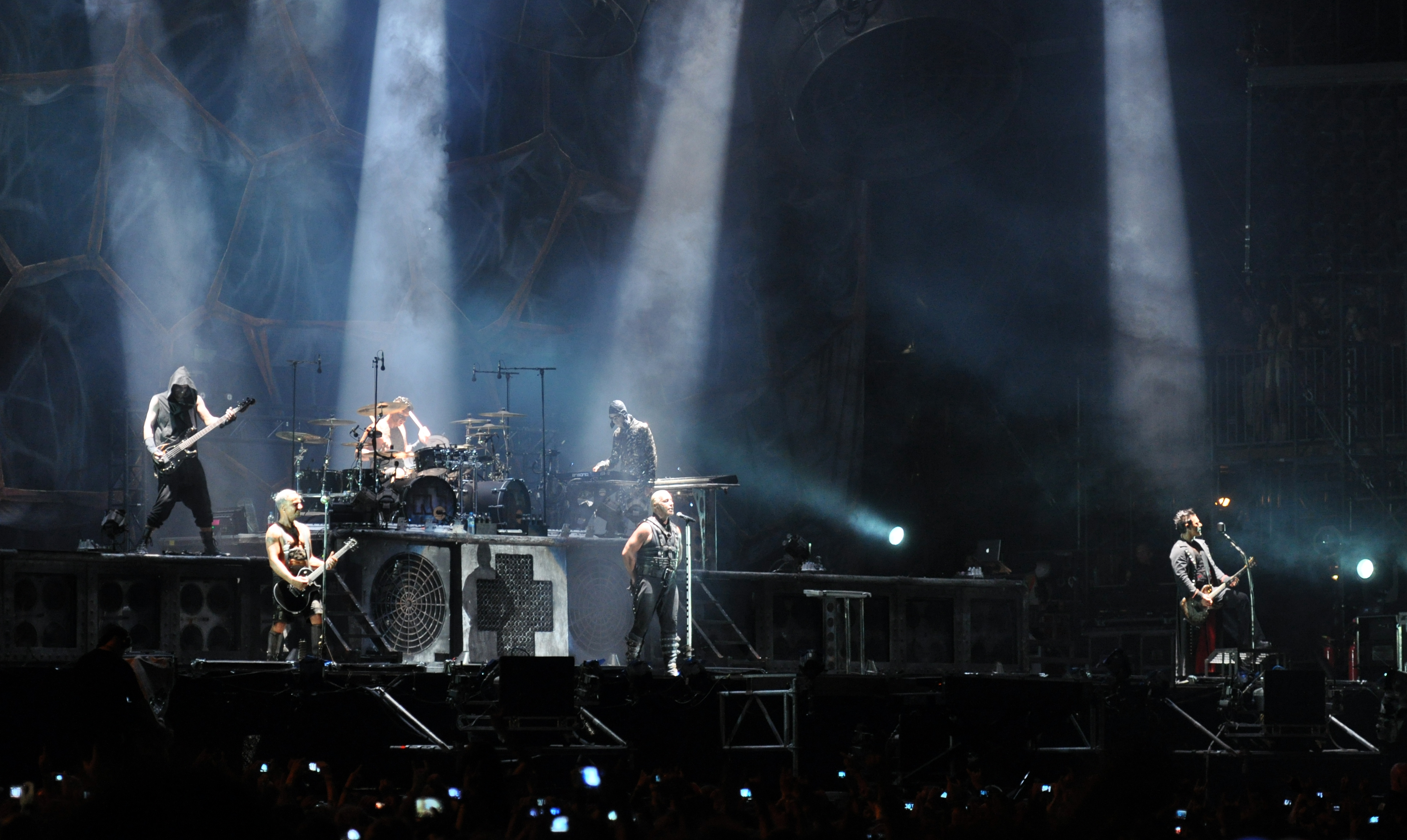
- Rammstein performing at Wacken Open Air in 2013; Upper level, from left: Oliver Riedel, Christoph Schneider, and Christian Lorenz; lower level: Paul Landers, Till Lindemann, and Richard Kruspe

Background information
- Origin: Berlin, Germany
- Genres: Neue Deutsche Härte; industrial metal
- Years active: 1994–present
- Labels: Universal; Motor; Slash
- Spinoff of: Feeling B; First Arsch; Die Firma
- Members: Till Lindemann; Paul Landers; Christoph Schneider; Christian Lorenz; Richard Kruspe; Oliver Riedel
- Website: rammstein.de

Rammstein ([ˈʁamʃtaɪn], lit. "ramming stone") is a German Neue Deutsche Härte band formed in Berlin in 1994. The band's lineup—consisting of lead vocalist Till Lindemann, lead guitarist Richard Kruspe, rhythm guitarist Paul Landers, bassist Oliver Riedel, drummer Christoph Schneider, and keyboardist Christian "Flake" Lorenz—has remained unchanged throughout their history, along with their approach to songwriting, which consists of Lindemann writing and singing the lyrics over instrumental pieces the rest of the band has completed beforehand. Prior to their formation, some members were associated with the punk rock acts Feeling B and First Arsch.

After winning a local contest, Rammstein was able to record demos and send them to different record labels, eventually signing with Motor Music. Working with producer Jacob Hellner, they released their debut album Herzeleid in 1995. Though the album initially sold poorly, the band gained popularity through their live performances and the album eventually reached No. 6 in Germany. Their second album, Sehnsucht, was released in 1997 and debuted at No. 1 in Germany, resulting in a worldwide tour lasting nearly four years and spawning the successful singles "Engel" and "Du hast" and the live album Live aus Berlin (1999). Following the tour, Rammstein signed with major label Universal Music and released Mutter in 2001. Six singles were released from the album, all charting in countries throughout Europe. The lead single, "Sonne", reached No. 2 in Germany. Rammstein released Reise, Reise in 2004 and had two more singles reach No. 2 in Germany: "Mein Teil" and "Amerika"; the former song reached No. 1 in Spain, becoming their first No. 1 single.

Their fifth album, Rosenrot, was released in 2005, and the lead single, "Benzin", reached No. 6 in Germany. Their second live album, Völkerball, was released in 2006. The band released their sixth album, Liebe ist für alle da, in 2009, with its lead single, "Pussy", becoming their first No. 1 hit in Germany despite having a controversial music video that featured hardcore pornography. The band then entered a recording hiatus and toured for several years, releasing the Made in Germany greatest hits album as well as the Rammstein in Amerika and Paris live albums. After a decade without new music, Rammstein returned in 2019 with the song "Deutschland", which became their second No. 1 hit in Germany. Their untitled seventh studio album was released in May 2019 and reached No. 1 in 14 countries. While sheltering during COVID-19 lockdowns, the band spontaneously wrote and recorded their eighth studio album, Zeit, which was released in April 2022. Following with Live Aus Mexico City which was set to release on November 20, 2026

Rammstein was one of the first bands to emerge within the Neue Deutsche Härte genre, with their debut album leading the music press to coin the term, and their style of music has generally had a positive reception from music critics. Commercially, the band has been very successful, earning many No. 1 albums as well as gold and platinum certifications in countries around the world; they are considered to be the most successful German-language band of all time. Their grand live performances, which often feature pyrotechnics, have contributed to the growth in their popularity. Despite success, the band has been subject to some controversies, with their overall image having been criticized; for instance, the song "Ich tu dir weh" forced its parent album Liebe ist für alle da to be placed on the "index" maintained by the German Federal Review Board for Media Harmful to Minors and re-released in Germany with the song removed due to its sexually explicit lyrics.

== History ==
=== Founding and Herzeleid (1989–1996) ===
Rammstein have used their logo since the release of Mutter in 2001 and their typeface since the start of their discography. A red version is used for their Youtube channel.

"I don't want to be another KISS, where people talk about makeup and stuff like that and no one talks about the music."

— Richard Kruspe

In 1989, East German guitarist Richard Kruspe escaped to West Berlin and started the band Orgasm Death Gimmick. At that time, he was heavily influenced by US music, especially of hard rock band Kiss. After the Berlin Wall came down, he moved back home to Schwerin, where Till Lindemann worked as a basket-weaver and played drums in the band First Arsch (loosely translated as "First Arse" or "First Ass"). At this time, Kruspe lived with Oliver Riedel of The Inchtabokatables and Christoph Schneider of Die Firma.

In 1992, Kruspe made his first trip to the United States with Till Lindemann and Oliver "Ollie" Riedel. He realized that he did not want to make US music and concentrated on creating a unique German sound. Kruspe, Riedel and Schneider started working together on a new project in 1993. Finding it difficult to write both music and lyrics, Kruspe persuaded Lindemann, whom he had overheard singing while he was working, to join the fledgling group.

The band co-existed with the members' previous projects for about a year and a half. Members would invest the money raised with Feeling B shows in new project. They recorded their first songs in a building that had been squatted by Feeling B frontman Aljoscha Rompe. A contest was held in Berlin for amateur bands in 1994, the winner of which would receive access to a professional recording studio for a whole week. Kruspe, Riedel, Schneider, and Lindemann entered and won the contest with a 4-track demo tape with demo versions of songs from Herzeleid, written in English. This sparked Paul Landers' attention, who wanted in on the project upon hearing their demo. To complete their sound, Rammstein attempted to recruit Christian "Flake" Lorenz, who had played with Landers in Feeling B. Though initially hesitant, Lorenz eventually agreed to join the band.

Up to that point, the band was called Tempelprayers. The name Rammstein comes from an early idea of Schneider, Flake and Paul. They called themselves Rammstein-Flugschau (Rammstein Airshow) after the 1988 Ramstein air show disaster. They had that name already written inside their Robur LO during their time in Feeling B. Guitarist Paul Landers said the spelling of Ramstein with the extra "m" was a mistake. After the band became popular, the band members denied the connection to the air show disaster and said that their name was inspired by the giant doorstop-type devices found on old gates, called Rammsteine. The extra "m" in the band's name makes it translate literally as "ramming stone". In a 2019 feature, Metal Hammer explained that the band was named after one of their earliest songs, "Ramstein", written after the air show disaster at the American airbase in Ramstein. According to the band, people started to refer to them as "the band with the 'Ramstein song'" and later as the "Ramstein band". Before agreeing on the name "Rammstein", the band also had other names in mind: Milch (milk), Erde (earth) or Mutter (mother).

Later, Rammstein was signed by Motor Music. Rammstein began to record their first studio album, Herzeleid, in March 1995 with producer Jacob Hellner. They released their first single "Du riechst so gut" that August and released the album in September. Throughout October, the newly minted band gathered their first few significant waves of fans while opening 15 shows across Germany for Project Pitchfork. Later in that November, they opened two shows for Clawfinger in Warsaw and Prague. In December, they headlined a 17-show tour of Germany which helped expand the fanbase they had initially established while opening for Project Pitchfork and Clawfinger. This helped to boost the band's popularity and establish them as a credible live act. They went on several tours throughout early 1996, releasing their second single titled "Seemann" on 8 January. On 27 March 1996, Rammstein performed on MTV's Hanging Out in London, their first performance in the UK. Their first major boost in popularity outside Germany came when Nine Inch Nails frontman Trent Reznor chose two Rammstein songs, "Heirate mich" and "Rammstein", during his work as music director for the David Lynch 1997 film Lost Highway. The soundtrack for the film was released in the U.S. in late 1996 and later throughout Europe in April 1997. In the middle of 1996, they headlined one tour of their own in small, sold-out venues. Rammstein went on to tour through Germany, Austria, and Switzerland from September to October 1996, performing an anniversary concert on 27 September called "100 years of Rammstein". Guests to the concert included Moby, Bobo, and the Berlin Session Orchestra, while Berlin director Gert Hof was responsible for the light show.

=== Sehnsucht and Live aus Berlin (1996–2000) ===
Rammstein started recording Sehnsucht in November 1996 at the Temple Studios in Malta. The album was again produced by Jacob Hellner. "Engel", the first single from the album, was released on 1 April 1997 and reached gold status in Germany on 23 May. This prompted the release of a fan edition of the single, named Engel – Fan Edition. This contained two previously unreleased songs, "Feuerräder" and "Wilder Wein". Release of the second single from the album Sehnsucht was "Du hast", which hit the German single charts in August 1997 at No. 5. Rammstein then continued touring in the summer while Sehnsucht was released on 22 August 1997. The album reached No. 1 in Germany after two weeks in the charts. Simultaneously, Herzeleid and both Sehnsucht singles ("Du hast" and "Engel") were in the Top 20 of the German charts. Rammstein continued to headline sold-out shows throughout Europe in September and October. On 5 December 1997, they embarked on their first tour of the United States as the opening act for KMFDM. In July 1998, the band released a cover of the song "Stripped", originally released by Depeche Mode in early 1986; it was included on the tribute album For the Masses, the Rammstein version obtained moderate success in Germany and Austria.

On 22–23 August 1998, Rammstein played to over 17,000 fans at the Wuhlheide in Berlin, the biggest show the band had played there up to that date. Supporting acts were Danzig, Nina Hagen, Joachim Witt and Alaska. The show was professionally filmed, intended to be released on their upcoming live DVD, Live aus Berlin. Rammstein embarked on a live tour with Korn, Ice Cube, Orgy and Limp Bizkit called the Family Values Tour in September through to late October 1998. Continuing their success in the US, Sehnsucht received Gold record status there on 2 November. The band was nominated at the MTV European Music Awards for Best Rock Act and performed "Du hast" live on 12 November that year.

Rammstein had further success in 1999, starting in February with a nomination for Best Metal Performance at the 41st Annual Grammy Awards. A year after it was filmed, the Live aus Berlin concert was released on CD on 30 August 1999, with a limited edition double CD also available. Two weeks after it was released, Live aus Berlin went to No. 2 in the German Album Charts. On 13 September and 26 November 1999, the video and DVD versions of the concert were released respectively. Further popularity ensued when "Du hast" was included in The Matrix: Music from the Motion Picture.

=== Mutter (2000–2002) ===
Rammstein's album Mutter was recorded in the south of France in May and June 2000, and mixed in Stockholm in October of that year. During December 2000, Rammstein released an MP3 version of "Links 2-3-4" as a teaser for their new album. 2001 was a busy year for Rammstein, as the band needed to finish off the Sehnsucht Tour ending in January and February with the band playing the Big Day Out festival in Australia and New Zealand and some concerts in Japan. January also heralded the shooting of the video for their upcoming single, "Sonne", recorded in Potsdam at Babelsberger Filmstudios from 13 to 15 January 2001. The video was released on 29 January 2001. The single for "Sonne" was released on 12 February 2001 in Europe, featuring an instrumental version of the song, two remixes by Clawfinger and the song "Adios" from the upcoming album.

Mutter was released on 2 April 2001, sparking another Rammstein tour through Germany, Austria, and Switzerland. On 14 May, the second single from the album, "Links 2 3 4", was released, along with a video of the single on 18 May. After a tour throughout Europe in June, the band then toured the U.S., Canada and Mexico from June to August 2001. "Ich will", the third single from the album, was released on 10 September 2001 and a Tour edition of the Mutter album (the cover of which is red) was released, featuring alternative artwork and live versions of "Ich will", "Links 2 3 4", "Sonne" and "Spieluhr".

From 8 to 12 January 2002, Rammstein traveled to Prague to participate in a minor scene for the film XXX. The band is seen in the opening scene, performing their song "Feuer frei!" in a concert. "Feuer frei!" was released across Europe as the first single from the XXX soundtrack on 14 October 2002. Rammstein released two remixes of the song. Furthermore, the single's track listing included "Du hast" and "Bück dich" cover versions by Battery. The video for the single was edited by Rob Cohen and contains part of Rammstein's performance at the beginning of the film and part snippets from the film itself.

=== Reise, Reise, Rosenrot, and Völkerball (2003–2006) ===
Rammstein recorded Reise, Reise (meaning "journey, journey", or as a command "travel, travel", but also an archaic Reveille) at the El Cortijo studio in southern Spain in November and December 2003; it was mixed at Toytown studio in Stockholm, Sweden in April and May 2004. The first single from the album was "Mein Teil", released on 26 July. The video was shot in the Arena, in the Treptow district of Berlin. Outdoor shooting took place at the Deutsche Oper (Opera House) U-Bahn station on Bismarckstrasse. The director was Zoran Bihac, who also filmed the "Links 2 3 4" video. The video for the second single, "Amerika", was filmed on 6 and 7 August 2004 in the ruins of the former cement works in Rüdersdorf, near Berlin, under the direction of Jörn Heitmann (who also directed the "Ich Will" music video, among others). The space suits for the Moon scenes were borrowed from Hollywood and 240 tons of ash were needed to create the Moon landscape. The video premiered on 20 August, while the single was released on 13 September.

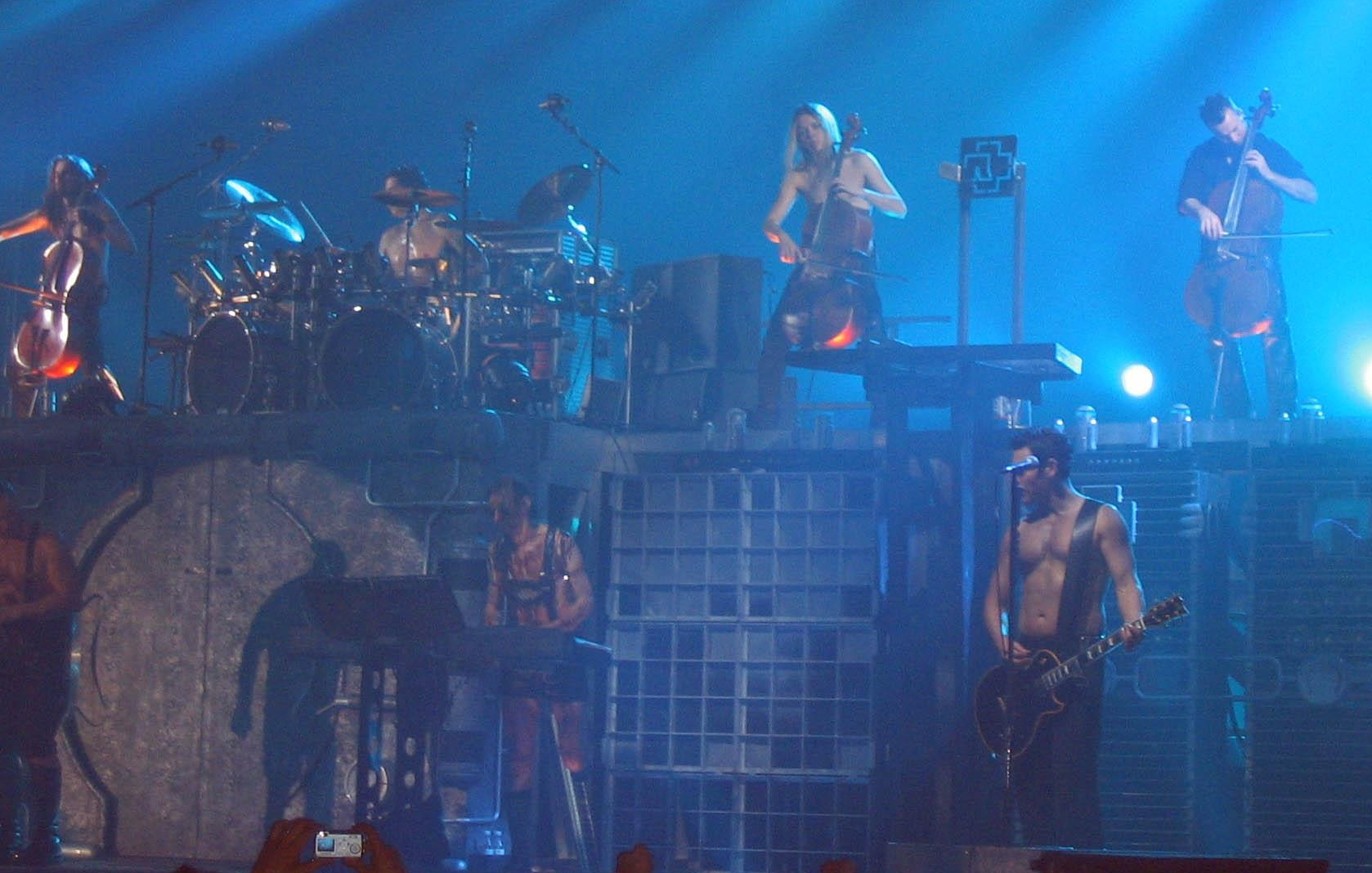
Rammstein performing along with Finnish act Apocalyptica in 2005

Reise, Reise was released on 27 September 2004 and went straight into top 10 charts throughout Europe. According to the Billboard charts, Rammstein were at that stage the most successful German-language band of all time. Rammstein toured Germany through November and some of December 2004, releasing the single "Ohne dich" on 22 November. In February 2005, Rammstein toured Europe again. By 28 February, Rammstein had played 21 concerts in front of more than 200,000 spectators in ten countries. It was on this tour that the band was faced with several lawsuits resulting from severe fire breathing accidents involving audience members. "Keine Lust" the fourth single from Reise, Reise, was released on 28 February 2005. From 27 May to 30 July 2005, Rammstein played music festivals across Europe. Footage from these concerts can be seen on Rammstein's live DVD Völkerball, released in November 2006.

In August 2005, Rammstein revealed that the follow-up album to Reise, Reise would be called Rosenrot. Their first single from the album, "Benzin", was released on 5 October, with its video premiere on 16 September. Rosenrot was released worldwide on 28 October. Directly following the release, the album continued the success of its predecessor, Reise, Reise, placing on top 10 charts in 20 countries. 16 December 2005 marked the release of the title track on Rosenrot. The video for "Mann gegen Mann" was released on 6 February 2006, with the single being released on 3 March. On 19 February 2006, Rammstein had an asteroid named after them, 110393 Rammstein.

On 17 November, the first Rammstein Live DVD since Live aus Berlin from 1998 was released. Völkerball shows concert performances by the band in England, France, Japan and Russia. The Special Edition is extended by a second DVD, which contains the documentaries "Anaconda in the net" by Mathilde Bonnefoy and the "Making of the album Reise, Reise" by the band's guitarist Paul Landers. The limited edition was released as a large black-and-white photo-book with photos by Frederic Batier, who had accompanied the band through their recent tours. The photo-book edition contains two DVDs and two live albums.

=== Liebe ist für alle da (2007–2011) ===
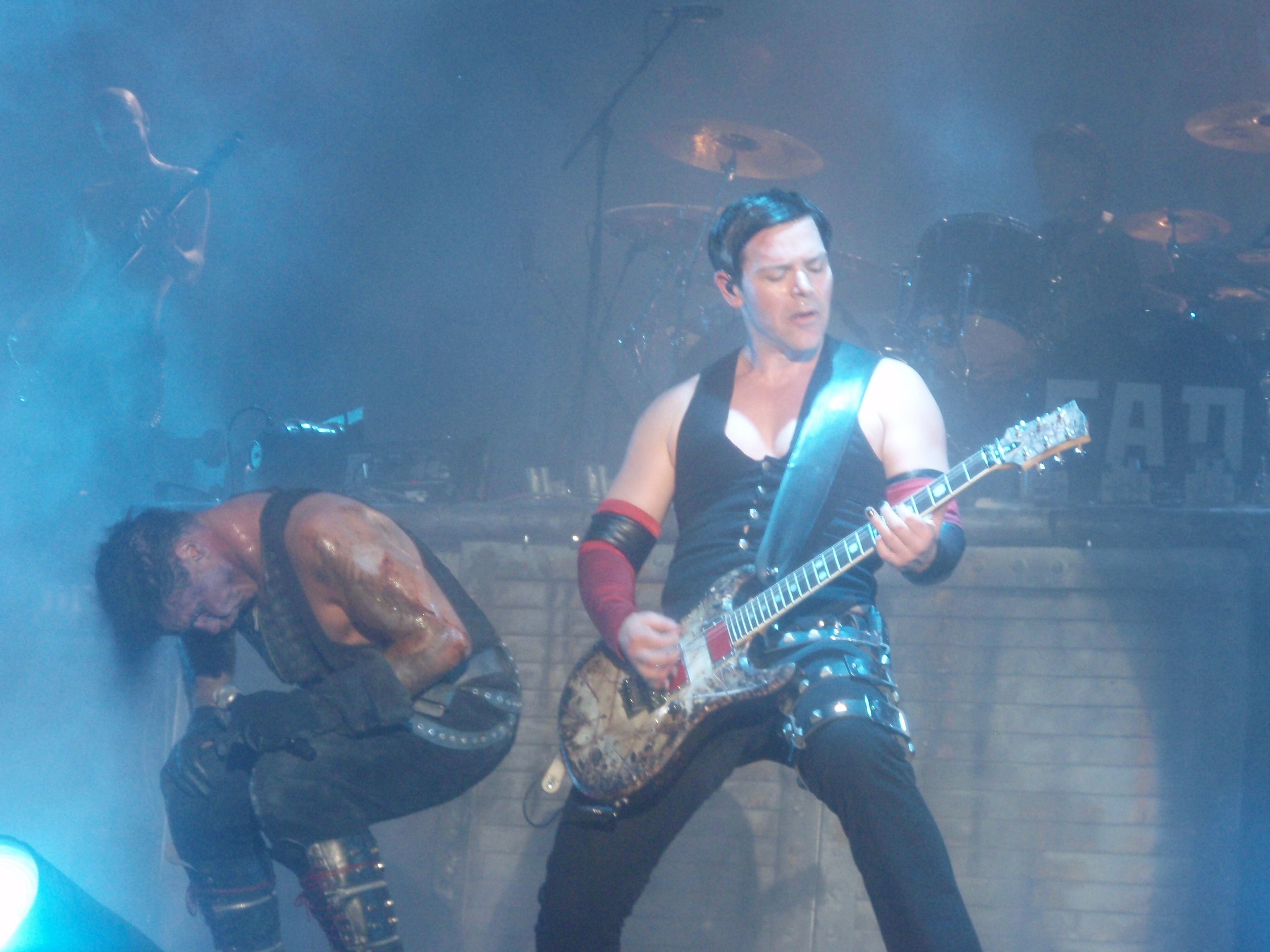
Rammstein performing at the Gold Coast Big Day Out in 2011

The band took a hiatus in 2006 and began work again in 2007. The recording process reportedly took two years. In July 2009, the title track "Liebe ist für alle da" leaked onto the internet, along with promotional materials. This led Universal Music to take action against certain fan sites. It was confirmed in August 2009 that the new album would have 11 tracks, and mixing of the album – which was taking place in Stockholm – had been completed. On 1 September 2009, it was confirmed on the band's website that "Pussy" would be the first single from the album. On the same day, The Gauntlet posted a promotional video for it. The video also confirmed the album title, Liebe ist für alle da. Later, the title was confirmed again in an interview with Paul Landers for RockOne magazine. The music video for "Pussy" was released on 16 September 2009, at 20:30 GMT, released especially for the adult website Visit-x. The video contains graphic scenes of male and female nudity as well as women engaging in sexual acts with the band members, although the actual sex scenes were performed by body doubles. The women featured in the video are German pornographic stars. Metal Hammer released an edited version of the video onto their website.

"Ich tu dir weh" was confirmed as the second single from the album by Landers and Lorenz in an interview for Radio Eins. Although censorship of the song in Germany prohibits any advertisement, broadcast or public display, the video to "Ich tu dir weh" was released on 21 December 2009 on the adult website Visit-x, just like the video to "Pussy", after advertisement on the band's official German website; it depicts the band on stage in a similar configuration as on their 2009/10 tour. Any references to the video on the official website have since been deleted. In Europe, the single was released on 15 January 2010, and in the U.S. on 19 January 2010. Like the video "Pussy," this video was also directed by Jonas Åkerlund. On 23 April 2010, Rammstein released their video "Haifisch" on the band's MySpace page. Unlike the video for "Ich tu dir weh", it contains more of a narrative rather than a performance. The single was released during May and June 2010.

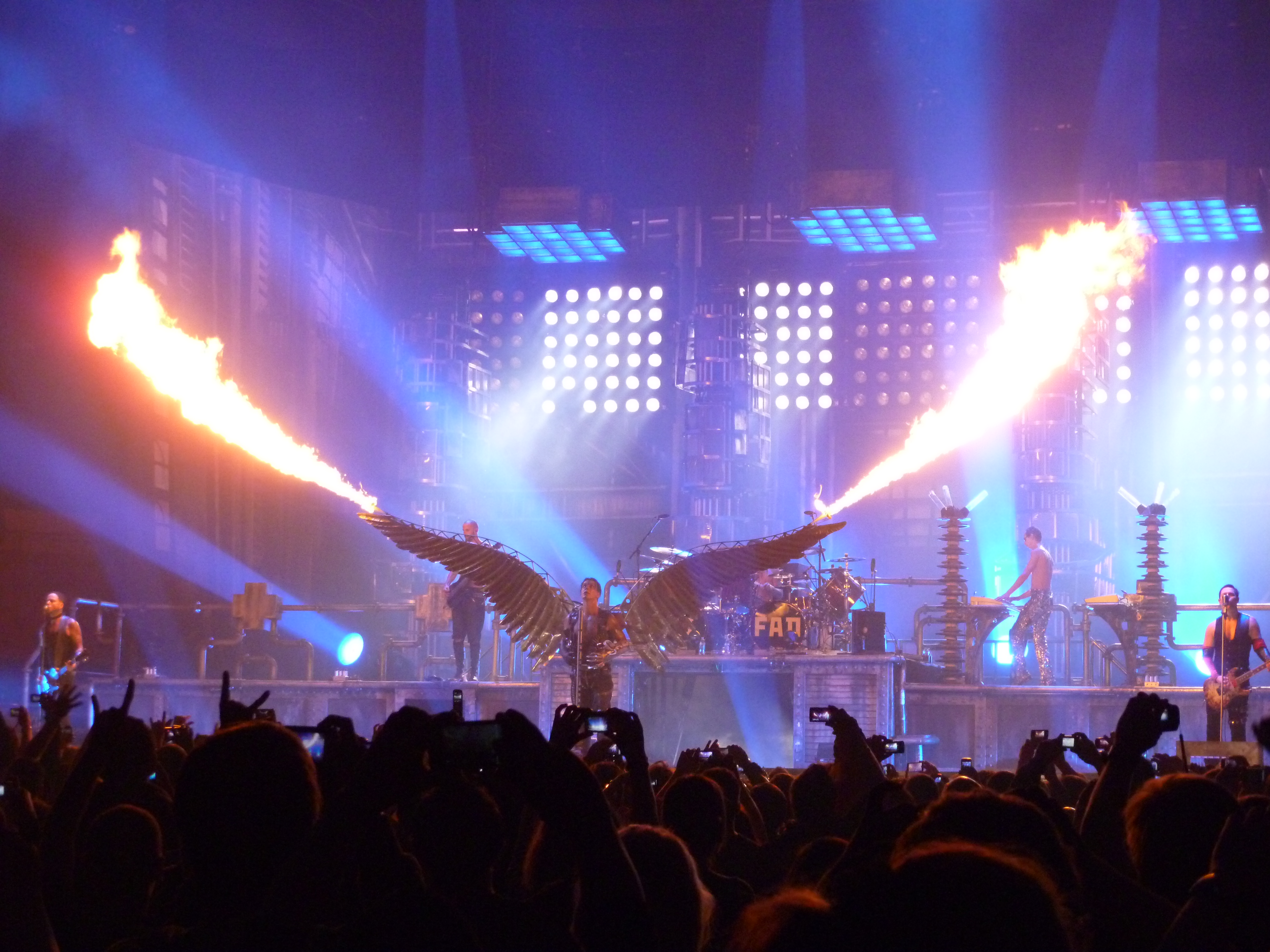
Rammstein playing "Engel" in Madison Square Garden in New York City, December 2010

On 8 November 2009, Rammstein began the first leg of the Liebe ist für alle da Tour in Lisbon, Portugal. As part of their European summer tour, Rammstein performed at the 2010 Rock AM Ring Festival on 4–6 June 2010. They also headlined several shows across Europe on the Sonisphere Festival, including their first ever outdoor UK performance at Knebworth Park, performing the day before Iron Maiden. On Sunday 18 July 2010, Rammstein played in front of more than 130,000 people in Quebec City on the Plains of Abraham as the closing show for the Festival d'été de Québec. It was their first North American appearance in nine years. The band announced that their last tour dates of 2010 were to be in the Americas. After several South American dates, the band returned to the United States for a single show at the famous Madison Square Garden in New York City – their first US show in over ten years. The tickets sold out in a very short time (under 20 minutes).

They also performed at Bell Centre in Montreal, Canada on 9 December. This concert sold out within the first hour of tickets going on sale, indicating a high demand to see Rammstein in North America. The band then played at Big Day Out 2011 from 21 January to 6 February in New Zealand and Australia. The band also visited South Africa for the first time in early 2011 and played two sold-out concerts in Cape Town and Johannesburg respectively, indicating another territory eager for the opportunity to enjoy the band live. On 16 February 2011, Rammstein announced that, after the massive success of their sold out Madison Square Garden show on 11 December 2010, they would be touring North America after ten years.

Rammstein played in New Jersey (East Rutherford) Izod Center, Montreal Bell Centre, Toronto Air Canada Centre, Chicago Allstate Arena, Edmonton Rexall Place, Seattle Tacoma Dome, San Francisco (Oakland) Oracle Arena, Los Angeles The Forum, and Las Vegas Thomas and Mack Center, Mexico City's Palacio de los Deportes, Guadalajara's Arena VFG, and Monterrey's Auditorio Banamex to a total of six US dates, three Canadian dates, and four Mexican dates. Tickets went on sale 25 and 26 February to great response, with many shows completely selling out, making this tour a complete success. On 20 April 2011, the band also won the Revolver Golden God Award for Best Live Band, their first US award.

=== Made in Germany, video releases, and side projects (2011–2017) ===
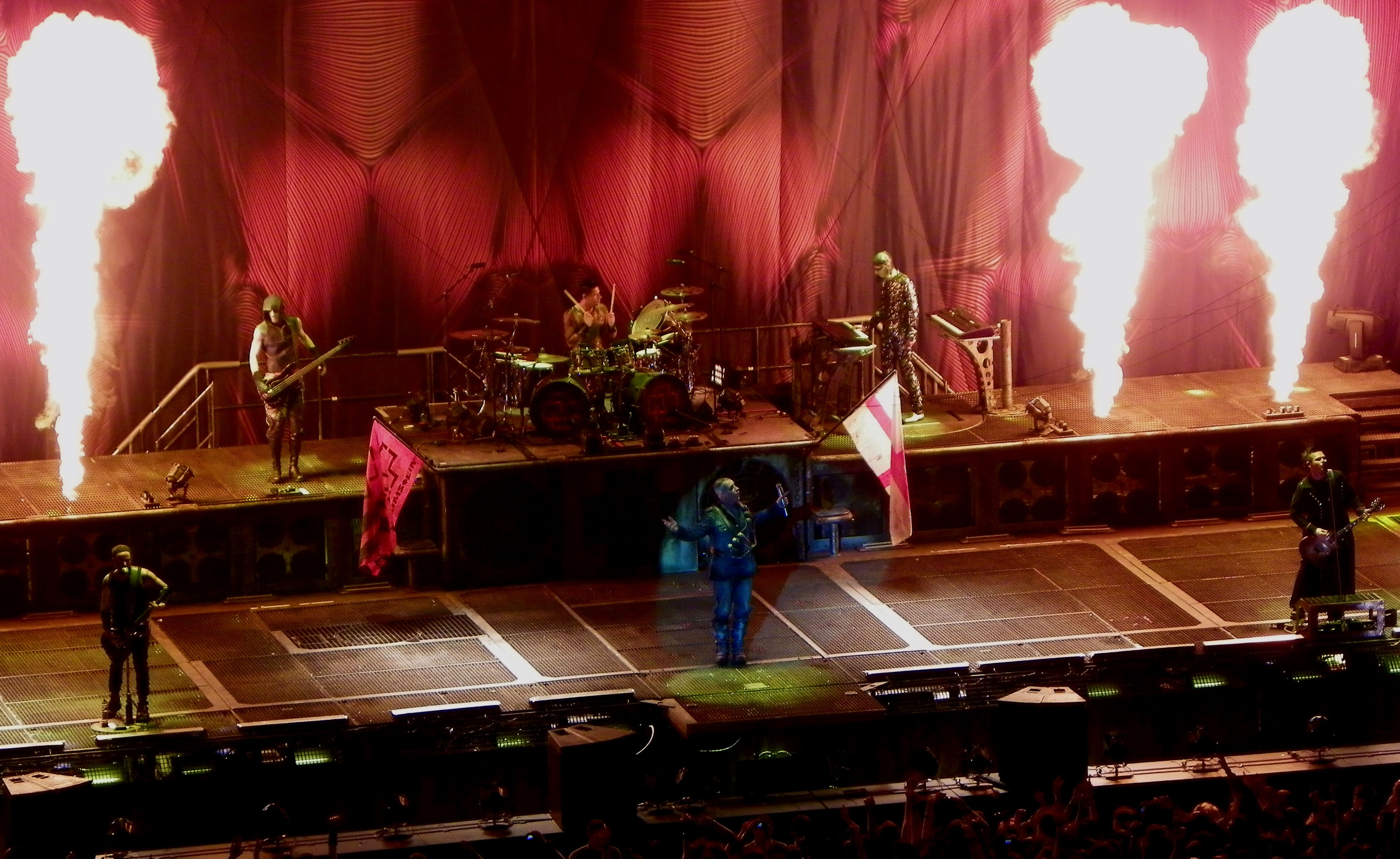
Rammstein performing in 2012

Rammstein released a greatest hits album titled Made in Germany 1995–2011 on 2 December 2011. It contains one previously unreleased track, "Mein Land" which was released as a single on 11 November 2011 with another track, "Vergiss uns nicht", that was released at a later date. The compilation is available in three editions: The standard edition; this includes a CD with normal songs from their back catalog. Special edition; has the same CD from the standard edition and an extra CD with Rammstein songs that have been remixed by different artists such as Scooter. Finally, the super deluxe edition; has the two previously mentioned CDs and three DVDs with interviews and the making of videos from different music videos. The video for the song "Mein Land" was filmed on 23 May 2011 at Sycamore Beach in Malibu, California. It premiered on the band's official website on 11 November 2011. A full European tour in support of Made in Germany began in November 2011 and spanned all the way to May 2012. It included a North American tour that began on 20 April 2012 in Sunrise, Florida and ended on 25 May 2012 in Houston, Texas that visited 21 cities throughout the US and Canada. The Swedish industrial band Deathstars supported the band during the first two legs of the European tour. DJ Joe Letz from Combichrist and Emigrate was the opening act for the North American Tour.

Rammstein, minus Till Lindemann, performed "The Beautiful People" with Marilyn Manson at the Echo Awards on 22 March 2012. On 21 September 2012, it was announced that Rammstein would be headlining Download Festival 2013, along with Iron Maiden and Slipknot. Twelve additional festival performances for summer 2013 were announced the same day, including Wacken Open Air festival and Rock Werchter. Rammstein announced new tour dates starting for spring 2013 in Europe, including a 2-day return to Kindl-Bühne Wuhlheide, the location of their first (official) live DVD, Live Aus Berlin. On 22 November 2012, Rammstein announced via Facebook that they will be releasing a video collection featuring all music videos entitled Videos 1995–2012, plus two unreleased music videos for "Mein Herz Brennt", originally featured on the album Mutter. The first video premiered on the band's Vimeo, while the second premiered on a promotional website. Both videos were directed by Zoran Bihac. The first was released on 7 December 2012, and featured the newly recorded piano version of "Mein Herz Brennt". A single of the song was released on the same day, which included an edited version of the original and a new song titled 'Gib Mir Deine Augen' as a b-side. The explicit version's video leaked onto the internet on 11 December 2012 but was officially released on 14 December, in conjunction with the video collection DVD.

In July 2013, guitarist Paul Landers revealed in an interview the possibility of a Rammstein documentary and a live DVD. He indicated that the band may "start thinking" about a new album in 2014. In September 2014, band co-founder Richard Kruspe (then working with his side band, Emigrate) said the band was preparing some more live DVDs and that they were taking some time off from the studio. The band would meet again in 2015 to decide if the time was right to return to the studio. In May 2015, Lindemann confirmed in an interview with MusikUniverse that Rammstein would start pre-production on a possible new album in September of that year, and that production would most likely go on until 2017. According to Peter Tägtgren – who works with frontman Till Lindemann on their side-project Lindemann – Till would be regrouping with his Rammstein bandmates later in 2015 to start pre-production on a new full-length album, which normally takes two years to be released.

In early August 2015, Rammstein released a trailer for an upcoming project, titled "In Amerika". On 15 August, the band announced Rammstein in Amerika, a video release that includes a 2010 concert at Madison Square Garden in New York City and a documentary made from archived footage recorded during the band's career. Rammstein played several festivals in Europe and North America during 2016, and in November announced plans to perform at a similar string of European festivals in 2017. On 18 January 2017 Rammstein announced a new live video release titled Paris, a recording of a March 2012 concert that took place at Palais Omnisports de Paris-Bercy in Paris. It premiered on 23 March in selected cinemas, and was released worldwide on DVD/Blu-ray and CD on 19 May 2017.

=== Untitled seventh album, Zeit, and Live in Mexico City (2017–present) ===
In an interview in March 2017, Richard Kruspe said that Rammstein had about 35 new songs that were close to completion, though the release date of the band's seventh studio album was still an open question. In May, Rammstein started touring once again. Also in May, it was revealed that Sky van Hoff would be working with the band on their next album. On 18 June 2018, it was announced via StubHub's ticketing website that Rammstein would play songs at their Puerto Vallarta, Mexico, show from their forthcoming album, then set for release late in 2018. On 17 September 2018, the band announced through Facebook that they were "almost done" recording the album, as they were recording orchestra and choirs in Minsk. On 2 January 2019, guitarist Richard Kruspe announced that the recording of the album wrapped in November 2018 and that the record would be released in April 2019, along with five music videos.

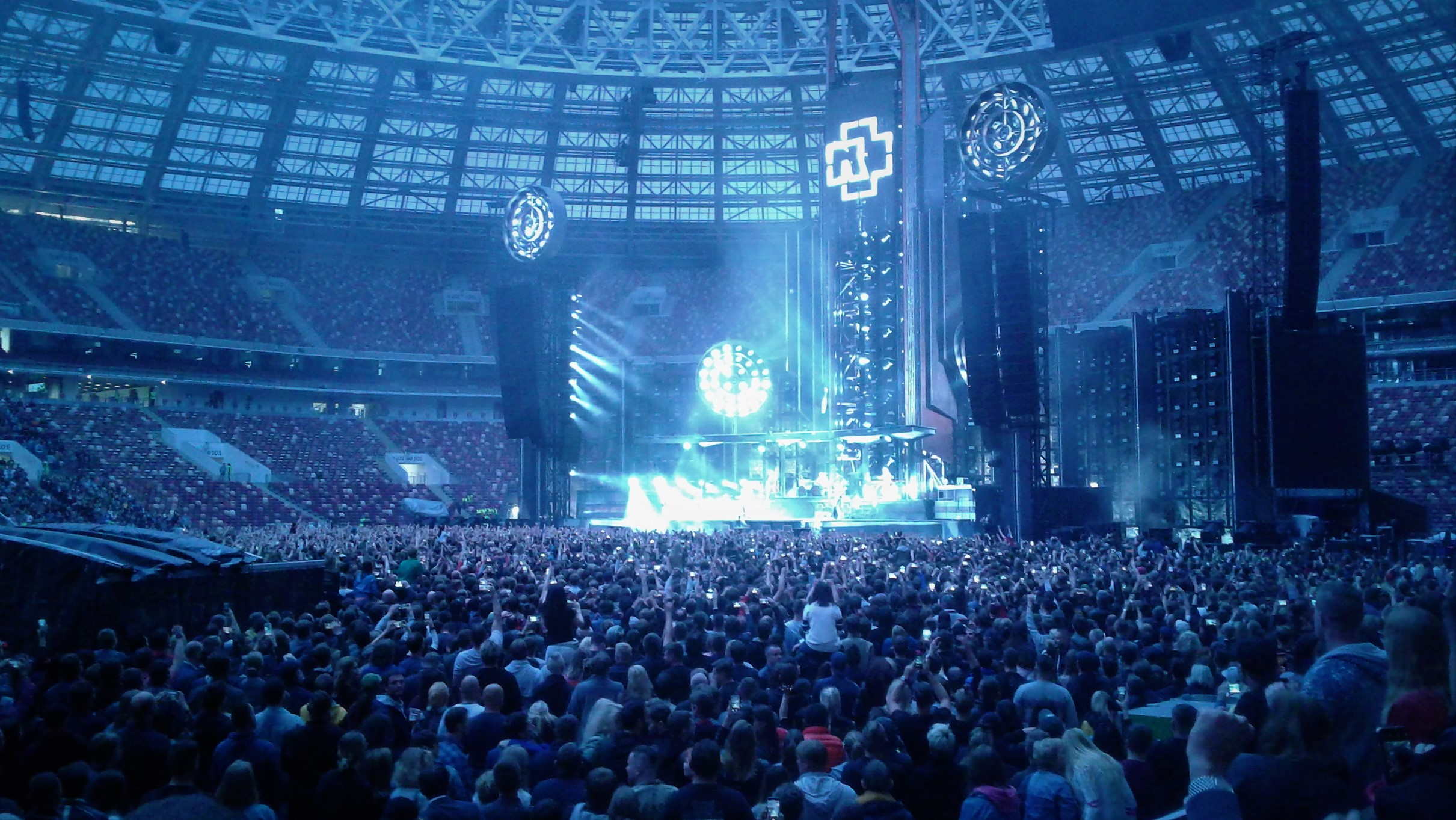
Rammstein performing in Moscow's Luzhniki Stadium on 29 July 2019

Rammstein released the first single from their seventh album, "Deutschland", on 28 March 2019 and announced the release date of their untitled seventh studio album, 17 May 2019. Rammstein also revealed the album cover which consisted of a single, unlit match which fans say represents their love of fire and simplicity. On 26 April 2019, Rammstein released the second single from the new album, "Radio". Shortly after its release, the album reached No. 1 in fourteen countries. On 28 May 2019, Rammstein released their third single and music video from the album, this time for "Ausländer". The band embarked on their Stadium Tour to support the album, beginning in May 2019. They were due to play shows in Europe and North America in 2020, but were forced to postpone them due to the COVID-19 pandemic impacting the two continents. The dates first were rescheduled for 2021 and, in March 2021, again rescheduled to 2022.

During the COVID-19 pandemic, which forced the band to remain sheltered during a lockdown in Germany, the band returned to writing music, which Christoph Schneider confirmed in a German podcast. It was reported in September 2020 that they had returned to La Fabrique Studios in France, where they recorded their untitled seventh album, to record new music, potentially for a new album. On 25 September, the 25th anniversary of their debut album Herzeleid, they announced a remastered anniversary edition for the album, for release on 4 December. The release was made available both digitally and physically, as a CD housed in a digipak as well as a double heavyweight, colored vinyl.

In February 2021, Flake Lorenz confirmed to Motor Music that the band had finished recording an eighth studio album. Lorenz stated that the recording sessions were unplanned and that the quarantine caused by the pandemic allowed for "less distraction" and "more time to think of new things". In October 2021, a song from the album was premiered on the International Space Station to French astronaut Thomas Pesquet. According to composer Sven Helbig, who worked on the album, the album's release had been delayed due to the 2021–2023 global supply chain crisis, which impacted the album's physical releases. Richard Kruspe affirmed in an interview that Rammstein's eighth studio album would be released in the first half of 2022, prior to the slated resumption of their Stadium Tour that had been postponed to 2022.

Rammstein began teasing the first single from their eighth studio album on 8 March 2022, posting clips to their social media accounts with the hashtag "#ZEITkommt". On 10 March, they formally announced the album, titled Zeit, revealing its release date of 29 April 2022. The release of the title track as the album's lead single, along with its music video, coincided with the announcement. The second single from Zeit, "Zick Zack", was released on 7 April with its accompanying music video. The third single from Zeit, "Angst", was released on 29 April with its accompanying music video. On 25 November 2022 Rammstein released the music video for the song "Adieu" on their official YouTube channel. On 9 June 2023, the band released a remastered anniversary edition to their “Sehnsucht” album, released back in 1997. Their stadium tour came to an end in Gelsenkirchen on 31 July 2024, where it began over five years previously.

In September 2026, Rammstein announced a new live album, "Rammstein - Live in Mexico City". The album will include recordings from the band's performances at the Foro Sol in Mexico City from October 2022. Concurrently, a live concert film culled from the Mexico City performances was released. The film was given a theatrical release worldwide.

== Musical style and lyrics ==
By comparison, American heavy metal bands seem clumsy, childish, and anemic.

— Claire Berlinski on Rammstein

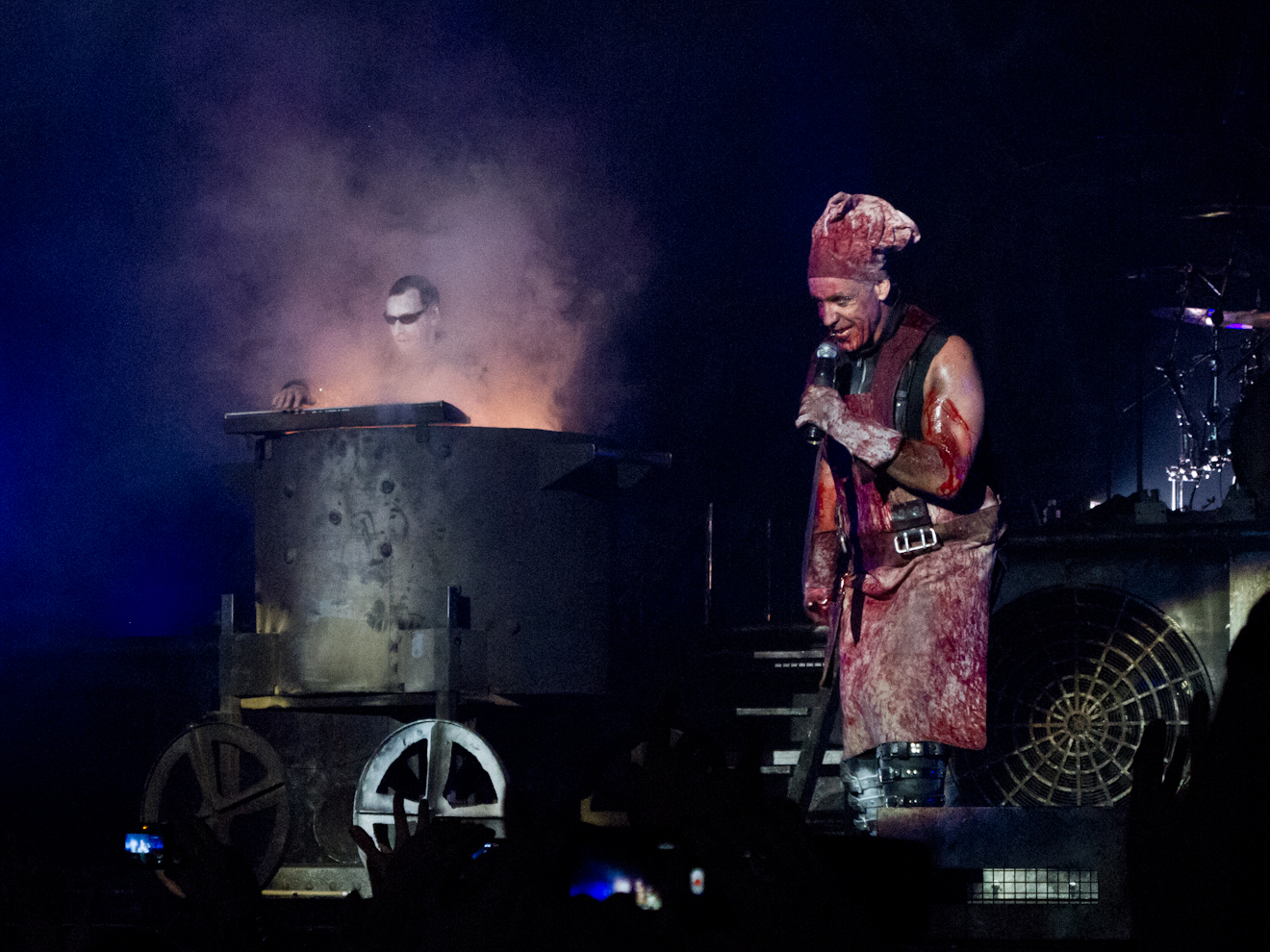
Rammstein's song "Mein Teil" is based on the Armin Meiwes cannibalism case. Live performances of the song feature Lindemann cooking Lorenz in a large pot (pictured).

The Denver Post wrote that "[Rammstein] proved that they not only synthesized the Neue Deutsche Härte genre, but that they successfully made it an art." Pioneers of the genre, Rammstein's style blended "alt-metal, groove and electronica". The Guardian wrote, "Ostensibly the world's biggest industrial metal band, Rammstein sound like a mixture of Laibach's situationist anthems, Front 242's 'electronic body music', German drinking songs, opera [and] T Rex-like riffs". Loudwire wrote that the band's "jawdropping, pyro-filled live shows have become as much a part of their identity as their gothy, distortion-saturated melodic electro-metal". IGN said that "The band alternates repetitive metal power chords and atmospheric tones for a mind-numbing blend of metal and electronic music." Rammstein were also described as a gothic metal band who are "Marilyn Manson meets 'Sprockets'". The Bulletin wrote that "Rammstein crank out the kind of symphonic metal you'd expect from a country that boasts Wagner among its favourite sons." AllMusic described the band's music as blending "industrial noise, grinding metal guitars, and operatic vocals". PopMatters said that Rammstein was "mistakenly lumped in with the nu-metal fad that was going on at the same time" as the band's debut.

Rammstein was traditionally inspired by bands such as the Slovenian group Laibach, known for its provocative songs, often citing political symbols of the far-right and whose music style also combines different genres, or the German rock band Oomph! However, the band members do not see a real connection to Laibach – apart from the similarity in vocal style which Flake Lorenz admitted in a Viva interview from 1997. In the same interview Richard Kruspe said: "For me, Laibach is a very, very intellectual story. Rammstein is much more emotional for me – in the beginning. And I can't do anything with that intellect that Laibach uses."

Unlike many bands from Berlin in the early 1990s, Rammstein did not want to imitate American or English bands. Flake Lorenz said in an interview: "We found the style by knowing exactly what we didn't want. And we just didn't want to do American funky music or punk or anything we can't do. We realized that we can only do this music that we also play. And it's just very simple, dull, monotone."

Rammstein's style has received positive feedback from critics. New Zealand's Southland Times (17 December 1999) suggested that Till Lindemann's "booming, sub-sonic voice" would send "the peasants fleeing into their barns and bolting their doors", while The New York Times (9 January 2005) commented that on the stage, "Mr. Lindemann gave off an air of such brute masculinity and barely contained violence that it seemed that he could have reached into the crowd, snatched up a fan, and bitten off his head". Stephen Thomas Erlewine of AllMusic commented that "their blend of industrial noise, grinding metal guitars, and operatic vocals is staggeringly powerful". "We just push boundaries", said Till Lindemann in an interview with rock magazine Kerrang!, "We cannot help it if people don't like those boundaries being pushed".

Nearly all of Rammstein's songs are in German. Educated in East German schools, the members were all taught Russian as a second language rather than English. In 2019, Flake commented: "I saw a lot of East German bands that sung in very bad English to people who didn't understand English – it was absolutely stupid. But if you really want to tell your emotions, you have to speak in your mother tongue." Songs they have recorded entirely or partly in English include: a cover of Depeche Mode's 1986 song "Stripped" and English renditions of "Engel", "Du hast", and "Amerika". The original version of "Amerika" as well as "Stirb nicht vor mir (Don't Die Before I Do)" and "Pussy" also contain some lyrics in English. The song "Moskau" ("Moscow") contains a chorus in Russian, and Till Lindemann has an unofficial song called "Schtiel" (cover of song "Штиль" / "Shtil" by Russian popular heavy metal band Aria) entirely in Russian. "Te quiero puta!" is entirely in Spanish, "Frühling in Paris" has a chorus in French, "Zeig dich" contains lyrics in Latin performed by a choir and "Ausländer" has lyrics in English, French, Spanish, Italian, and Russian. Oliver Riedel commented that "[the] German language suits heavy metal music. French might be the language of love, but German is the language of anger". In an interview with Ultimate Guitar, when asked whether Rammstein would ever create an original song entirely in English, Till Lindemann stated that they might not, because "It's like asking the Buddha to kill a pig or something".

The band's lyrics, as sung by Till Lindemann, are an essential element of their music, and shape the perception by fans and a wider public. Among other things that are seen as controversial, Rammstein also refers to classical German literature, e.g. Johann Wolfgang von Goethe's famous poems Der Erlkönig (1778) and Das Heidenröslein (1771) for the songs "Dalai Lama" and "Rosenrot", respectively. Their fourth album, Reise, Reise, is loosely inspired by the crash of Japan Air Lines Flight 123. The band have also occasionally delved into politics with their lyrics. "Amerika" is a critique of the cultural and political imperialism of the United States all over the world. The lyrics of the song "Deutschland" contain the lines "Deutschland! / Meine Liebe / kann ich dir nicht geben" (Germany! / My love / [is what] I cannot give you), which conveys the band's inability to have unquestioned patriotic feelings.

== Live performances ==
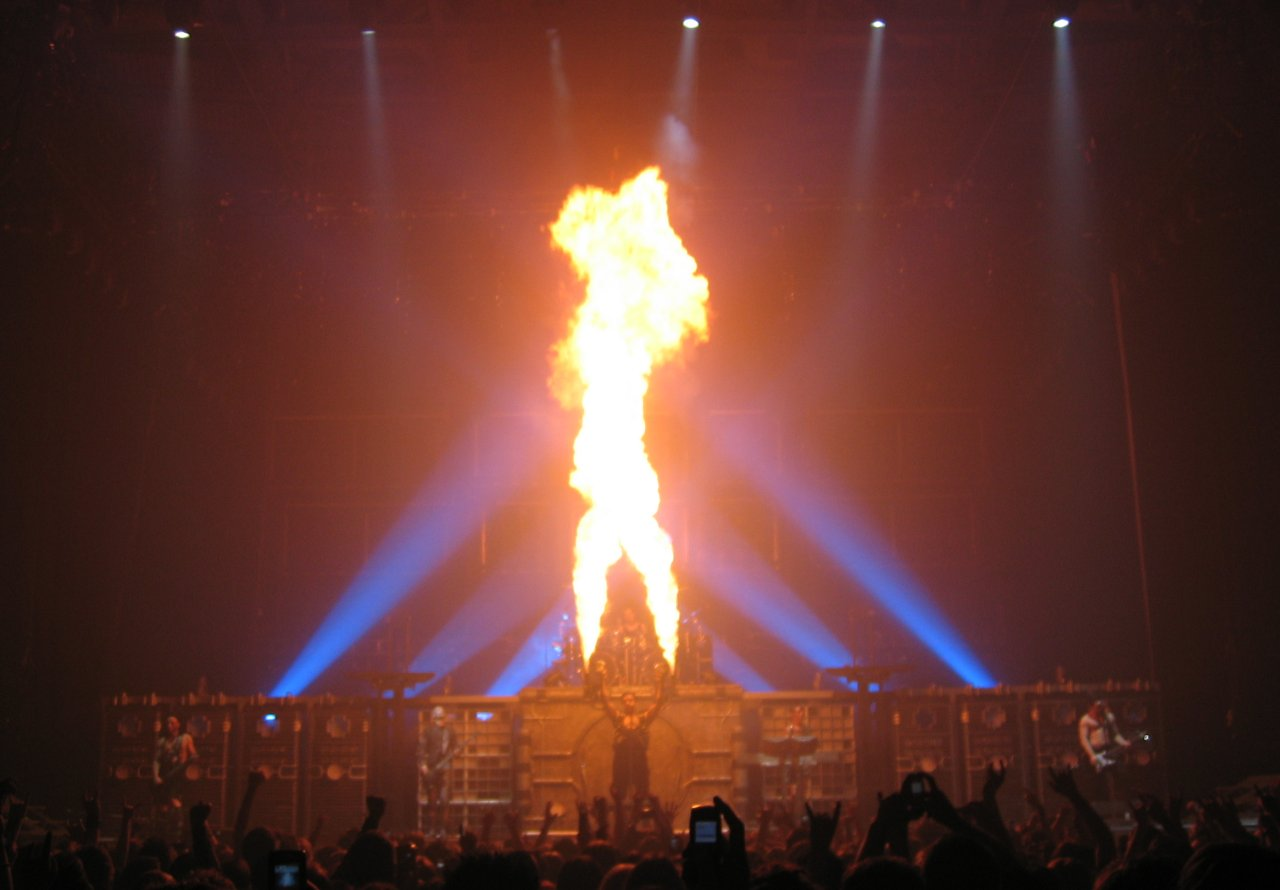
Rammstein are known for their frequent use of pyrotechnics during live performances.

Since their early years, Rammstein are particularly known for their over-the-top live performances, making such extensive use of pyrotechnics that fans eventually coined the motto, "Other bands play, Rammstein burns!" (a play on Manowar's song "Kings of Metal", which states that "other bands play, Manowar kill"). Following an accident in Berlin on 27 September 1996, in which some burning decorative parts of the stage collapsed, the band started using professionals to handle the pyrotechnics. Lindemann subsequently qualified as a licensed pyrotechnician, and often spends entire songs engulfed in flames. He has suffered multiple burns on his ears, head, and arms.

The band's stage costumes are also known for being outlandish. During the Reise, Reise Tour, they wore lederhosen, corsets, and military-inspired uniforms with German steel helmets; during the Mutter Tour, the group kept to the themes of the album artwork and descended onto the stage from a giant uterus while wearing diapers. During the Völkerball concert, among others, Lindemann changed costumes between songs and dressed accordingly for each. For example, for the song "Mein Teil", he was dressed as a blood-soaked chef; in "Reise, Reise", he dressed as a sailor. The rest of the band each wore their own preferred costume, but none quite as bizarre as Till's. The band's flair for costumes is evident in their music videos as well as their live shows. In the "Keine Lust" video, all members except Lorenz are dressed in fat suits. In the "Amerika" video, all members of the band wear astronaut costumes.

Since the Mutter Tour in 2001, Rammstein have worked with stage designer Roy Bennett, who helped the band in developing the look of the stages. With the Ahoi Tour in 2004/2005, the band began using a two-level stage, with half the band playing the lower level and the other half on the upper level. At this tour, the upper level rose over 2 meters above the stage floor and had an oval entrance just beneath the drums. At both sides of the upper level, a special lift made it possible for the band members to access both stage levels.

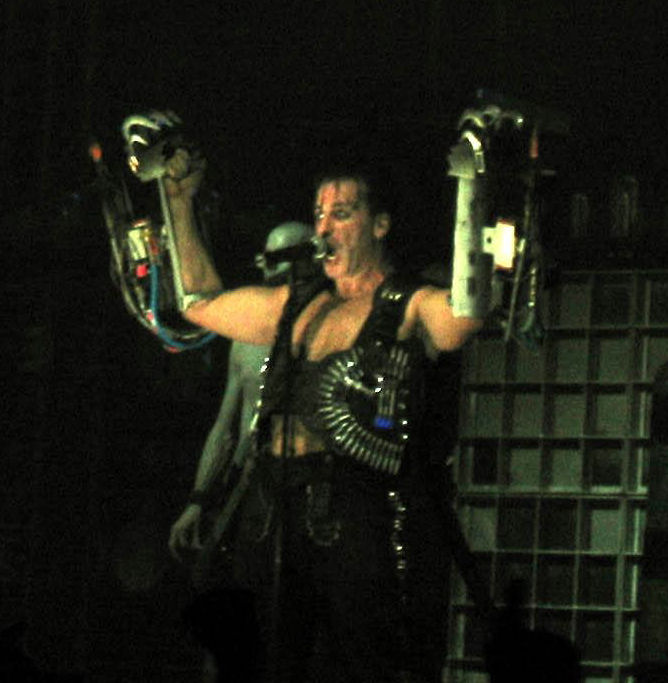
Till Lindemann performing "Rammstein", during which he wears dual arm-mounted flamethrowers

On the Liebe ist für alle da Tour in 2009, the new stage still had a two-level design. This time, however, the upper level only had about half the height as on the previous tour. Stage entrance was possible by a hydraulic ramp in the middle of the stage floor. At each end of the upper level, stairs were placed in order to gain access to both levels. This tour included not only the extensive use of pyrotechnics, but also a massive lighting show, such as the band's logo lit up as big lamps on four enormous collapsible towers, forming the industrial backdrop of the set and being capable of different lighting effects.

During the arena shows of the Made in Germany 1995-2011 Tour, the stage was slightly altered with new set pieces such as a large industrial fan as well as new backdrops. The most noticeable addition was a long catwalk, connecting the main stage to a smaller stage in the middle of the audience. During the 2013 festival leg of the tour, the bridge and smaller stage were omitted. For the 2016 Festival Tour, the band kept the stage itself mostly unchanged, though had the entire lighting rig changed completely. According to Kruspe, the onstage antics are meant to get people's attention and have fun at the same time; Rammstein's motto, according to Schneider, is "do your own thing and overdo it".

Kruspe said of the stage show in July 1999, "You have to understand that 99 per cent of the people don't understand the lyrics, so you have to come up with something to keep the drama in the show. We have to do something. We like to have a show; we like to play with fire. We do have a sense of humour. We do laugh about it; we have fun [...] but we're not Spinal Tap. We take the music and the lyrics seriously. It's a combination of humour, theatre, and our East German culture, you know?"

Their antics have also garnered controversy. During the American Family Values Tour 1998, alongside acts such as rapper Ice Cube, Korn, and Limp Bizkit, the band was arrested for public indecency. In one of their more infamous moments, Lindemann engaged in simulated sodomy with Lorenz during their performance of "Bück dich" in Worcester, Massachusetts. They were subsequently arrested, fined $25 (equivalent to $50 in 2025) and spent one night in jail.

== Controversies ==
=== Imagery ===
The New York Times described Rammstein's music as a "powerful strain of brutally intense rock... bringing gale-force music and spectacular theatrics together". The members have not been shy about courting controversy and have periodically attracted condemnation from morality campaigners. Till and Flake's stage act earned them a night in jail in June 1999 after a liquid-ejecting dildo was used in a concert in Worcester, Massachusetts. Back home in Germany, the band faced repeated accusations of fascist sympathies because of the dark and sometimes militaristic imagery of their videos and concerts, including the use of excerpts from the film Olympia by Leni Riefenstahl in the video for their cover of Depeche Mode's song "Stripped". MTV Germany studied the lyrics, talked to the band and came away satisfied that Rammstein are apolitical; Peter Ruppert, then head of Music Programming at MTV Germany, stated that the band "aren't in any way connected with any right-wing activities".

Their cover of their debut album Herzeleid, released in Germany in 1995, showed the band members bare-chested in a style that resembled Strength Through Joy in the eyes of some critics, who accused the band of trying to sell themselves as "poster boys for the Master Race". Rammstein have vehemently denied this and said they want nothing to do with politics or supremacy of any kind. Lorenz, annoyed by the claim, has remarked it is just a photo, and should be understood as such. Herzeleid has since been given a different cover in North America, depicting the band members' faces.

In October 2004, the video for "Mein Teil" ("My part") caused controversy in Germany when it was released. It takes a darkly comic view of the Armin Meiwes cannibalism case, showing a cross-dressed Schneider holding the other five band members on a leash and rolling around in mud. The band's own views of its image are sanguine; Landers has said: "We like being on the fringes of bad taste". Christian "Flake" Lorenz comments: "The controversy is fun, like stealing forbidden fruit. But it serves a purpose. We like audiences to grapple with our music, and people have become more receptive". The video for "Pussy" was released September 2009. It features hardcore pornographic scenes of nudity along with women engaging in sexual activity with body doubles of the band members.

The video of "Deutschland", released in 2019, sparked further controversy, as it portrays black German actress Ruby Commey appearing as Germania, which has been described as "a calculated affront to German nationalists". The video also portrays the band members both as Nazi concentration camp executioners and as Jewish prisoners, sparking the complaints of Holocaust survivor groups; however, others defended the video and the song lyrics, which have been interpreted as "express[ing] a love/hate relationship with Germany".

=== Relation to violent events ===
Rammstein were cited in relation to the Columbine High School massacre in 1999, when a photo of Eric Harris wearing a Rammstein T-shirt in the 11th grade was revealed. There was no evidence to correlate the band and the massacre. In response to the shooting, the band issued a statement:

The members of Rammstein express their condolences and sympathy to all affected by the recent tragic events in Denver. They wish to make it clear that they have no lyrical content or political beliefs that could have possibly influenced such behaviour. Additionally, members of Rammstein have children of their own, in whom they continually strive to instill healthy and non-violent values.

Coincidentally, on 10 September 2001 the single and video clip of "Ich will" ("I Want") was released, which portrays the band as bank robbers who want to get a message across and receiving a Goldene Kamera (Golden Camera) award, a German version of the Emmy award, for their "actions". In the United States, the video clip was broadcast only late at night after the attacks of 11 September 2001, although many media officials and politicians requested the video to be pulled from broadcast completely.

Following the conclusion of the Beslan school hostage crisis in Russia in September 2004, the Russian authorities claimed that the terrorists had "listened to German hard rock group Rammstein on personal stereos during the siege to keep themselves edgy and fired up". The claim has not been independently confirmed.

Band members said this about the issue:

There's been a lot of talk about that, but if there are radical feelings in people anything can wake them – a painting, a picture, whatever. It's just a coincidence that it happened to be our music. It's important to think about what caused them to make their decisions, how they became animals, not their taste in music. Whenever something like this happens it's like 'Okay, let's blame the artist'. Such bullshit.

— Till Lindemann

Our music is made to release aggression, and people listening to it are also needed to do that, but it's not our fault. Should we stop making hard music because bad people might like it?

— Christoph Schneider

Pekka-Eric Auvinen, the perpetrator of the Jokela school shooting in November 2007, also included Rammstein as one of his favorite bands. However, he noted that the music among other things was not to blame for his decisions.

Elliot Rodger, the perpetrator of the Isla Vista killings in May 2014, was also a fan of Rammstein according to his YouTube records. On a lyric video of Mein Herz brennt, Rodger wrote: "[G]reat song to listen to while daydreaming about being a powerful ruler". Even though Rodger wrote in his manifesto that he wished to become a dictator and punish all the people who rejected him, there was no direct link found between the band's music and the killing spree. Santa Barbara police later confirmed that Rodger's main motivations were sexual and social rejection.

The Trollhättan school attack perpetrator, Anton Lundin Pettersson, used a manipulated version of the band's logo that added Nazi Germany's eagle on his Facebook page.

=== Placement on the Index ===
On 5 November 2009, their sixth studio album Liebe ist für alle da was placed on the Index of the Federal Department for Media Harmful to Young Persons (Bundesprüfstelle für jugendgefährdende Medien, or BPjM), making it illegal in Germany to make the album accessible to minors or display it where it can be seen by people underage, effectively banning it from stores. According to the official statement of the BPjM, the depiction of lead guitarist Richard Kruspe holding a woman wearing only a mask over his knee and lifting his hand to strike her behind has given cause for offense, as well as the lyrics to "Ich tu dir weh" (meaning "I hurt you") which supposedly promoted dangerous BDSM techniques. Furthermore, the advisory board took into consideration the alleged promotion of unprotected sexual intercourse in the lyrics to "Pussy".

The band, as well as several members of the German press, reacted with astonishment to the decision. Keyboardist Christian Lorenz expressed surprise at the advisory board's "parochial sense of art" and regretted their apparent inability to detect irony. On 16 November 2009, a stripped-down version of Liebe ist für alle da was released. As of 31 May 2010, the administrative court in Cologne had decided to suspend the inclusion into the Index (case 22 L 1899/09). The Bundesprüfstelle deleted the record from the Index on 1 June (Decision No. A 117/10). On 9 June, the band announced that the original version of the album was available in their shop and that the single "Ich tu dir weh" would soon be released in Germany. In October 2011, the album was judged not harmful to minors and deleted from the Index.

In 2016, Rammstein filed a lawsuit against the German state claiming €66,000 in compensation for damages that had allegedly resulted from the indexing, chiefly the destruction or withholding of 85,000 copies of the album that the band says would have otherwise sold.

=== Concert misconduct allegations ===
In May 2023, a woman claimed that her drink was spiked during a Rammstein concert in Lithuania and that she was selected for an aftershow party, during which she was ushered into a small room underneath the stage for lead singer Till Lindemann. After making herself unavailable for sex, she claimed Lindemann reacted angrily and left. While emphasising that she was never assaulted, she believed there to be an "organised system of funnelling girls." Although Vilnius prosecutors found no evidence of drugging, her story amplified the band's "Row Zero" practice, where young women would be pre-selected on social media by casting director Alena Makeeva to stand in an exclusive area closest to the stage dubbed Row Zero and attend pre-show and after-show parties, during which Lindemann would request to have sex with fans in attendance. Further claims against Lindemann prompted an investigation by German police for sexual offences and the distribution of narcotics. In response, the band denied all claims of illegal behavior, fired Makeeva and halted the "Row Zero" afterparties.

In view of the allegations, Rammstein's label Universal announced that it would be suspending all promotional activities for Rammstein's albums. Universal also confirmed a press report that it had confidentially requested the German Music Industry Association BVMI not to include the 25th anniversary re-release of Sehnsucht in the official album charts, regardless of its actual sales figures, and that the request had been authorized by the band itself. Various other companies including Kiepenheuer & Witsch and Rossmann also halted joint ventures with the band.

On 29 August, the German prosecutors announced that they dropped the case, saying that the investigations did not unearth any evidence of a crime. The investigations were originally taken up because of complaints filed by unaffected third persons who were unable to identify any victim. While alleged victims sent sworn statements to journalists, none of those women filed a criminal complaint, and therefore the police were unable to contact and interview them. The journalists had also promised the alleged victims anonymity, and made use of their legal right to keep their sources secret.

On 30 October, the Rammstein Instagram account announced in its story that Shelby Lynn could not prove in court that she had been given drugs, and was therefore prohibited from continuing to claim this.

== Political views ==
Rammstein fights with sarcasm and satire against the "bland americanization" of local cultures in "Amerika" by attacking US Cultural imperialism in the form of popular culture, food, fashion, and yes, even politics.

— Jill E. Twark, Axel Hildebrandt on the song "Amerika"

Rammstein are a generally left-wing band. The song "Links 2-3-4" (Links being German for "left") was released in 2001 to combat early accusations by German media outlets of the band being neo-Nazis due to their imagery. In a 2011 interview with Rolling Stone Germany, when asked about Nazi accusations, Lindemann stated "We come from the East and we have grown up as socialists. We used to be either punks or Goths – we hate Nazis! And then suddenly there is such a far-fetched accusation. We are doing exactly the same thing today, but no one in America or in Mexico would even get the idea to come up with something like that. This only happens in Germany. Our reply to this animosity was 'Links 2-3-4', and with that we had made it clear where we stand politically." Regarding the song, Kruspe said: "'My heart beats on the left, two, three, four'. It's simple. If you want to put us in a political category, we're on the left side, and that's the reason we made the song". The song's title refers to the refrain of the German Communist Party song Einheitsfrontlied, written by Bertolt Brecht: "Drum links, zwei, drei! Drum links, zwei, drei! / Wo dein Platz, Genosse ist! / Reih dich ein, in die Arbeitereinheitsfront / Weil du auch ein Arbeiter bist". (Turn left, two, three! Turn left, two, three! / Here's the place, Comrade, for you! / So fall in with the Workers' united front / For you are a worker too.) Another key lyric expressing the band's allegiance to the left paraphrases the titles of newspaper columns published side by side for several years in the German newspaper Bild: "Mein Herz schlägt links" ("My heart beats on the left") by The Left Party co-chair and former Social Democratic Party of Germany chair Oskar Lafontaine, and "Mein Herz schlägt auf dem rechten Fleck" ("My heart beats in the right place") by Peter Gauweiler of the conservative Christian Social Union. Lorenz stated that the song was created to show the band could write a harsh, evil, military-sounding song without being Nazis.

The band also wrote the song "Amerika" as a critique of the worldwide cultural and political imperialism of the United States. In their book Envisioning Social Justice in Contemporary German Culture, Jill E. Twark and Axel Hildebrandt found that the song's text and most of its video's images point toward a critique of America's cultural imperialism, political propaganda, and self-assumed role as global police force. The song responds critically to the US invasion of Iraq in 2003. They also found that another song of theirs that is critical of the United States is "Mein Land", believing that it critiques American racism and nationalism.

During the Eastern European leg of their Europe Stadium Tour, the band showed support for the LGBT community on several occasions. At a concert in Chorzów, Poland on 24 July 2019, drummer Christoph Schneider surfed the crowd in a rubber boat, holding a rainbow flag. At their concert in Moscow five days later, guitarists Kruspe and Landers kissed onstage, while they embraced each other during a concert in Saint Petersburg on 2 August. The band's support for gay rights was met with criticism from some Russian politicians. Vitaly Milonov, a member of the State Duma, called the band "idiots" and said: "If they think it possible to behave in such a way, they should also consider it possible to keep this garbage away from us."

== Band members ==
Rammstein follow their own rhythm. We never give a shit about the people who think we need to get a record out every two years and that's one of the reasons why we're still together with the same lineup. We take care of each other, and if somebody needs to take the time off or do something else, we listen.

— Richard Kruspe

Since forming in 1994, Rammstein have retained a constant line-up. Richard Kruspe had said in a Revolver Magazine interview that it is because of the band respecting each other's wishes to take a break, either for personal reasons or to focus on a side project. Members of the band have had side projects that they take part in during Rammstein's inactivity. Kruspe currently fronts the group Emigrate while Till Lindemann began his project Lindemann in 2015.

- Till Lindemann – lead vocals
- Richard Kruspe – lead guitar, backing vocals
- Paul Landers – rhythm guitar, backing vocals
- Oliver Riedel – bass guitar
- Christoph Schneider (Note: Schneider is credited as "Christoph Doom Schneider" on all Rammstein releases.) – drums, percussion
- Christian "Flake" Lorenz (Note: Lorenz is commonly referred to as "Flake" and is credited as "Doktor Christian Lorenz" on all Rammstein releases.) – keyboards, synthesizers

Gallery
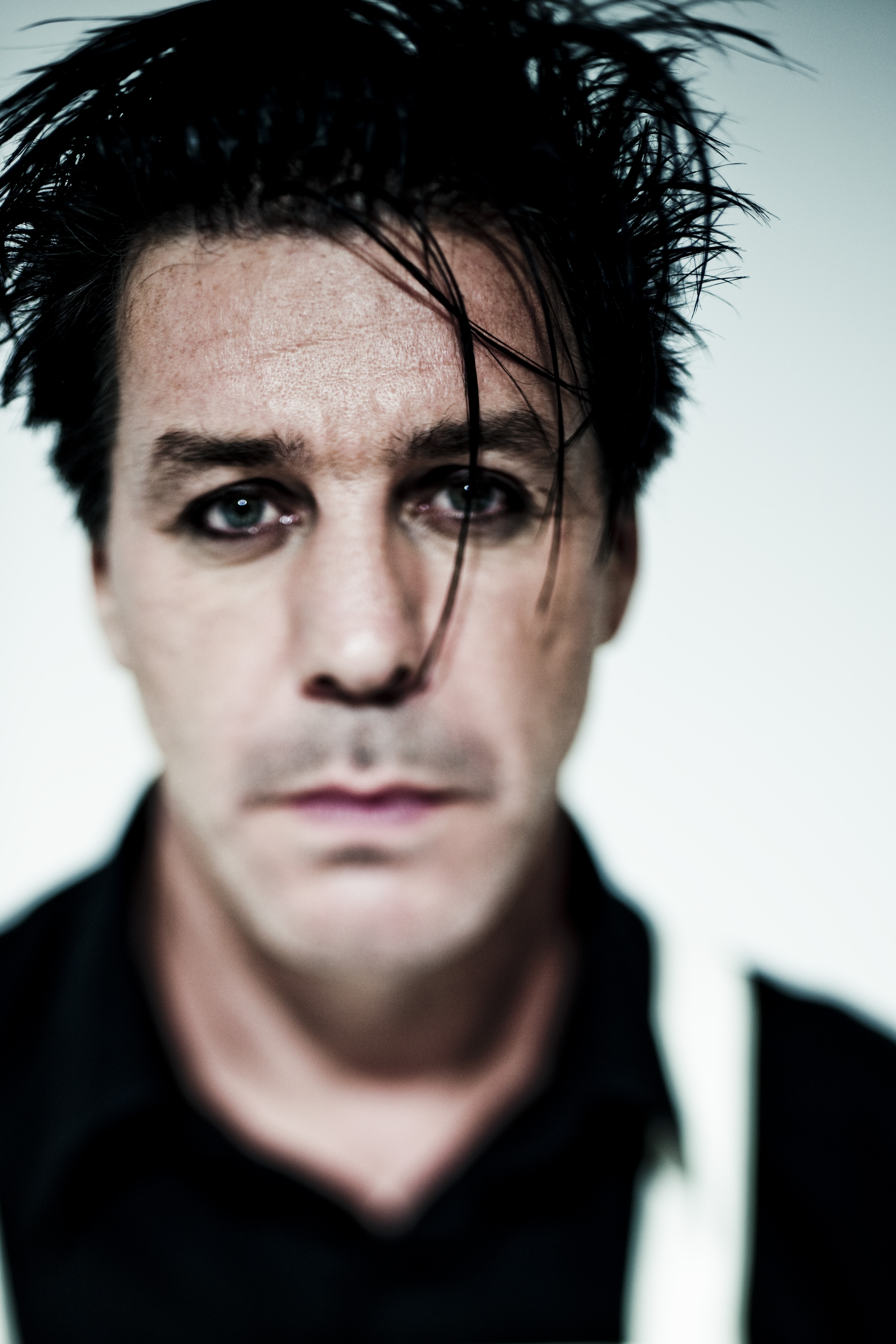
Till Lindemann

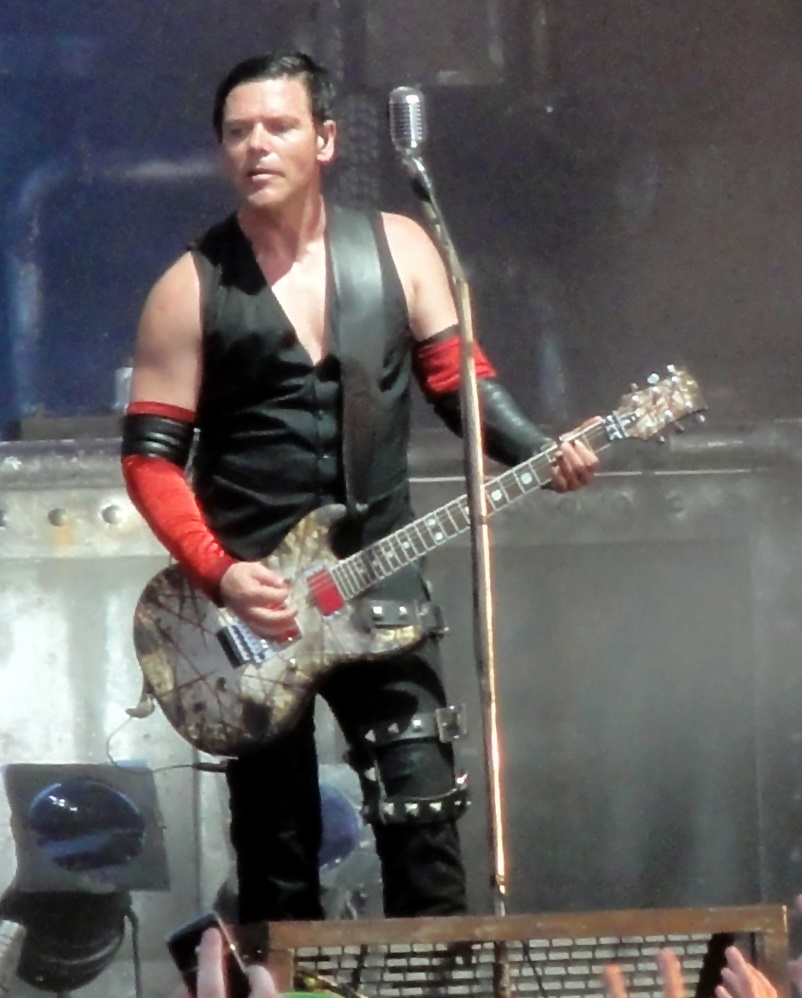
Richard Kruspe

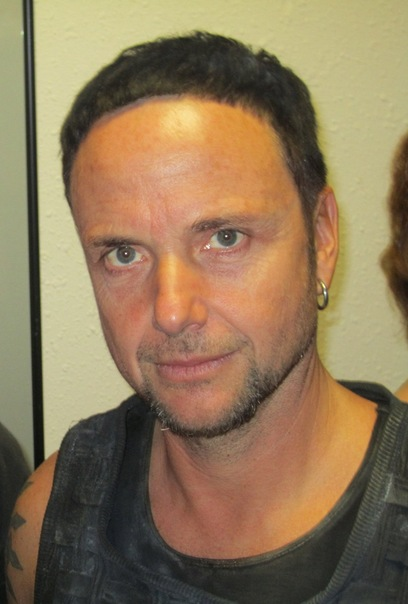
Paul Landers

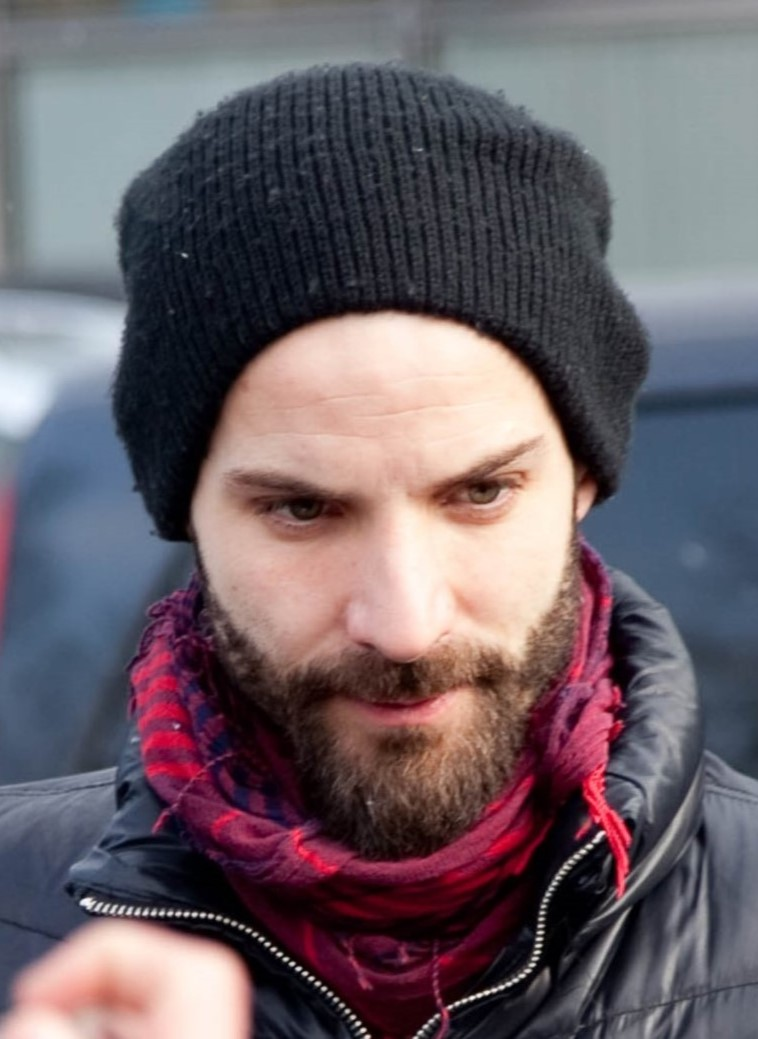
Oliver Riedel

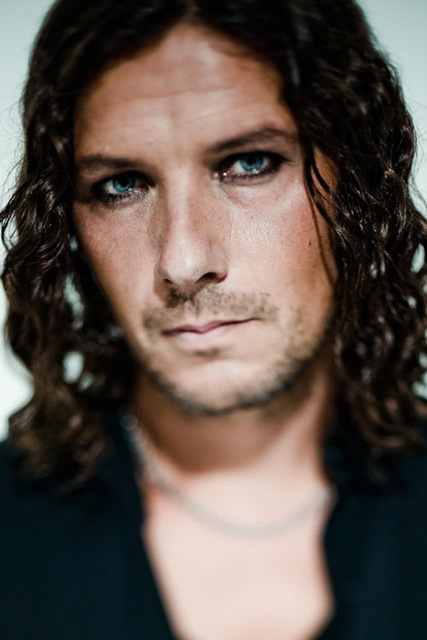
Christoph Schneider

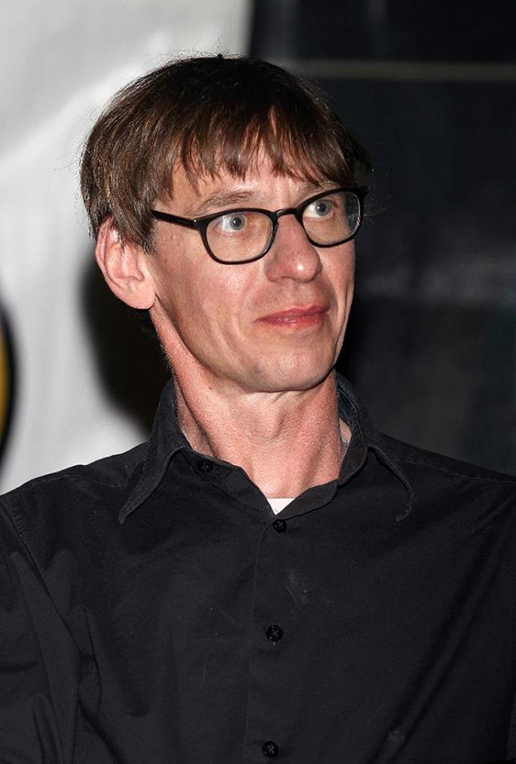
Christian "Flake" Lorenz

== Discography ==
Studio albums

- Herzeleid (1995)
- Sehnsucht (1997)
- Mutter (2001)
- Reise, Reise (2004)
- Rosenrot (2005)
- Liebe ist für alle da (2009)
- Untitled album (2019)
- Zeit (2022)

== Tours ==
- Club Tour (1994–1995)
- Herzeleid Tour (1995–1997)
- Sehnsucht Tour (1997–2001)
- Family Values Tour 1998 (22 September 1998 – 31 October 1998)
- Mutter Tour (2001–2002)
- Pledge of Allegiance Tour (2001; in between the August–November dates of the Mutter Tour)
- Ahoi Tour (Reise, Reise Tour) (2004–2005)
- Liebe ist für alle da Tour (2009–2011)
- Made in Germany 1995–2011 Tour (2011–2013)
- Rammstein Tour 2016 (2016)
- Festival Tour (2017)
- Rammstein Stadium Tour (2019–2024)

== Awards and honours ==
Grammy Awards

| Year | Nominee / work | Award | Result |
|---|---|---|---|
| 1999 | "Du hast" | Best Metal Performance | Nominated |
| 2006 | "Mein Teil" | Best Metal Performance | Nominated |

== See also ==
- Oomph!
- Eisbrecher
- Megaherz

== Notes and references ==
Notes
