= Liebe ist für alle da =

2009 studio album by Rammstein

Studio album by Rammstein
- Released: 16 October 2009
- Recorded: 2007–2009
- Studios: Sonoma Mountain Recording Estate (San Rafael); Henson (Los Angeles)
- Genres: Neue Deutsche Härte; industrial metal
- Length: 46:06
- Languages: German; English; French
- Label: Universal
- Producers: Jacob Hellner; Rammstein

Rammstein chronology
Völkerball (2006)	Liebe ist für alle da (2009)	Made in Germany 1995–2011 (2011)

Singles from Liebe ist für alle da
- 1. "Pussy" Released: 18 September 2009; 2. "Ich tu dir weh" Released: 5 February 2010; 3. "Haifisch" Released: 28 May 2010

Special edition cover

USA cover

Professional ratings
Review scores
Source	Rating
AllMusic	3.5/5 stars
BraveWords	8.5/10
Consequence of Sound	3.5/5 stars
Kerrang!	4/5 stars
Metal Hammer	4.5/5 stars
NME	4/5 stars
PopMatters	8/10
Release Magazine	6/10
Rock Sound	4.5/5 stars
Sputnikmusic	4.5/5

Liebe ist für alle da (German: [ˈliːbə ʔɪst fyːɐ̯ ˈʔalə daː], "Love is there for everyone"), often abbreviated to LIFAD, is the sixth studio album by German Neue Deutsche Härte band Rammstein. It was released through Universal Music in Europe on 16 October 2009, the United Kingdom on 19 October 2009, and the United States on 20 October 2009.

This would be the band's last album for nearly a decade, until the release of their untitled follow-up album in May 2019.

== Promotion and release ==
The album title was confirmed on 1 September 2009 in a promotional video for the new single "Pussy", released on 18 September 2009 in the European Union and 19 September 2009 in the United States. The single's B-side was "Rammlied". The video for "Pussy" was released on the adult website Visit-X two days before the single. The video features scenes of explicit male and female nudity as well as the band members (played by body doubles in the nude scenes) engaging in sexual activity with women. In June 2009, a demo version of the title track, "Liebe ist für alle da", leaked onto the internet, along with various promotional materials. Pictures taken throughout the recording of the album were later made available on Rammstein's official website. The album was released on 16 October 2009 in Europe and 20 October in the U.S.

Guitarist Paul Landers stated that tracks which did not make it on the album would appear as B-sides on singles and that there would be a special edition of the album with five bonus tracks On 8 November 2009, Rammstein played their first show for their Liebe ist für alle da Tour in Lisbon, Portugal – their first live show in four years. As announced, a video was shot for the album's third single, "Haifisch", which premiered on the band's MySpace page on 23 April 2010. "Waidmanns Heil" is a playable track in the rhythm video game Guitar Hero: Warriors of Rock. In February 2012 a total of 26 demos recorded during the recording sessions of the album were leaked onto the internet. In addition to the demos of songs already released on the album there were also the demo versions of two at the time unreleased songs, titled "Schenk mir Was" and "Rassmus" respectively. "Schenk mir Was" would be retitled as "Gib mir deine Augen", had some slight changes made to the lyrics and was ultimately released in December 2012 as a B-side of the Mein Herz brennt single. For "Rassmus" the lyrics were re-arranged, the original musical composition was entirely scrapped and replaced with a new one and the song was released officially in May 2019 on the band's Untitled seventh album under the name "Was ich liebe". In 2013, the song "Führe mich" was featured in Lars von Trier's film Nymphomaniac.

== Commercial performance ==
Liebe ist für alle da was certified platinum in Finland before its release, solely from pre-release sales. It debuted at number 3 in the French charts. The album also reached number 13 on the US charts, making it Rammstein's highest-charting album in the United States, although it subsequently fell off after four weeks. In Germany, the album entered the charts at number 1 after the best start of a music album in 2009 and beating popular German R&B singer Xavier Naidoo's new album Alles kann besser werden. It remained high in the charts until it was censored.

== Censorship ==
The album was added to the List of Media Harmful to Young Persons of the Federal Review Board for Media Harmful to Minors in Germany, due to the track "Ich tu dir weh" and a picture inside the album booklet displaying Richard Kruspe spanking a nude woman. The Federal Minister of Family Affairs, Senior Citizens, Women and Youth, Ursula von der Leyen, was in charge of the request to rate the Rammstein album. This meant only adults could purchase the album; additionally, it could not be displayed in stores that are accessible for minors (see BPjM for details). As a consequence, the album was re-released in Germany on 16 November in an edited version without the song and the picture.

The video for "Ich tu dir weh" was released on 21 December 2009 on the adult website Visit-X, after advertisement on the band's official website. Since the album is no longer classified as harmful to minors, the video is available on YouTube.

On 31 May 2010, the administrative court in Cologne decided to waive the suspensive effect of the censorship. The German department deleted the record from the censorship lists on 1 June. On 9 June, the band announced on their official website that the original version of the album was available at their shop and that a release of the single "Ich tu dir weh" in Germany was planned in a short period of time. The single was eventually released on 5 February 2010 and in the UK on 15 February 2010.

In the USA the cover was censored and hidden behind an extra paper, which showed the same artwork, but with an empty table on the front. The USA also censored the song title of Pussy to P***y, using a sticker.

== Track listing ==
All tracks are written by Rammstein (Richard Kruspe, Paul Landers, Till Lindemann, Christian Lorenz, Oliver Riedel, Christoph Schneider).

No.	Title	Length
1.	"Rammlied" ("Rammsong")	5:19
2.	"Ich tu dir weh" ("I'm Hurting You")	5:02
3.	"Waidmanns Heil" ("Huntsman's Salute")	3:33
4.	"Haifisch" ("Shark")	3:45
5.	"B********" (“(Bückstabü)”)	4:15
6.	"Frühling in Paris" ("Springtime in Paris")	4:45
7.	"Wiener Blut" ("Viennese Blood")	3:53
8.	"Pussy"	4:00
9.	"Liebe ist für alle da" ("Love Is There for Everyone")	3:26
10.	"Mehr" ("More")	4:09
11.	"Roter Sand" ("Red Sand")	3:59
Total length:		46:06

Notes

- According to Richard Kruspe, "B********" stands for "Bückstabü", a nonce word made up by the band to mean whatever the listener wants it to mean.
- The song "Frühling in Paris" features lyrics from the song "Non, je ne regrette rien" by Edith Piaf.
- The second track, "Ich tu dir weh", is replaced by four seconds of silence on the censored version of the album in Germany. It is marked on the case as "~~Ich tu dir weh~~* *Entfernt nach Zensur durch die Behörden der Bundesrepublik Deutschland." (Removed after censorship by the authorities of the Federal Republic of Germany).

=== iTunes-exclusive standard edition track ===
No.	Title	Length
12.	"Rammlied (Thrash-Terpiece Remix)" (by Robb Flynn)	6:19

- Placed after "Liese" on the iTunes-exclusive special edition.

=== Special edition bonus tracks ===
All tracks are written by Rammstein.

No.	Title	Length
1.	"Führe mich" ("Lead Me")	4:34
2.	"Donaukinder" ("Children of the Danube")	5:18
3.	"Halt" ("Stop")	4:21
4.	"Roter Sand (Orchester Version)" ("Red Sand (Orchestral Version)")	4:06
5.	"Liese" (female first name)	3:56
Total length:		22:15

- The bonus track "Donaukinder" ("Children of Danube") portrays the aftermath of the 2000 Baia Mare cyanide spill into the Danube river.
- A limited edition deluxe box set, released on 21 December 2009, features the special edition album (either censored or uncensored), handcuffs, lubricant and six dildos, all within an aluminium flight case.
- The Japanese edition, released in December 2009, comes as a double SHM-CD.

== Personnel ==
Rammstein

- Till Lindemann – lead vocals
- Richard Kruspe – lead guitar, backing vocals
- Oliver Riedel – bass guitar
- Paul Landers – rhythm guitar, backing vocals
- Christian Lorenz – keyboards
- Christoph Schneider – drums

Production

- Produced by Jacob Hellner and Rammstein

== Charts ==
=== Weekly charts ===
Chart (2009)	Peak position
Australian Albums (ARIA)	9
Austrian Albums (Ö3 Austria)	1
Belgian Albums (Ultratop Flanders)	3
Belgian Albums (Ultratop Wallonia)	4
Canadian Albums (Billboard)	29
Croatian Albums (IFPI)	7
Czech Albums (Čns Ifpi)	1
Danish Albums (Hitlisten)	1
Dutch Albums (Album Top 100)	1
Finnish Albums (Suomen virallinen lista)	1
French Albums (SNEP)	2
German Albums (Offizielle Top 100)	1
Greek Albums (IFPI)	30
Hungarian Albums (MAHASZ)	10
Irish Albums (IRMA)	25
Italian Albums (FIMI)	14
Japanese Albums (Oricon)	165
Mexican Albums (AMPROFON)	4
New Zealand Albums (RMNZ)	15
Norwegian Albums (VG-lista)	4
Polish Albums (ZPAV)	2
Portuguese Albums (AFP)	4
Russian Albums (2M)	2
Scottish Albums (Official Charts)	14
Slovenian Albums (Vikend)	1
Spanish Albums (Promusicae)	5
Swedish Albums (Sverigetopplistan)	3
Swiss Albums (Schweizer Hitparade)	1
UK Albums (Official Charts)	16
US Billboard 200	13
US Top Rock Albums (Billboard)	3

=== Year-end charts ===
Chart (2009)	Position
Austrian Albums (Ö3 Austria)	9
Belgian Albums (Ultratop Flanders)	42
Belgian Albums (Ultratop Wallonia)	85
Dutch Albums (Album Top 100)	50
Finnish Albums (Suomen virallinen lista)	3
French Albums (SNEP)	88
German Albums (Offizielle Top 100)	7
Polish Album (ZPAV)	30
Swedish Albums (Sverigetopplistan)	55
Swiss Albums (Schweizer Hitparade)	12

Chart (2010)	Position
Austrian Albums (Ö3 Austria)	49
Belgian Albums (Ultratop Flanders)	81
Dutch Albums (Album Top 100)	96
German Albums (Offizielle Top 100)	67
Russian Albums (2M)	21
Swiss Albums (Schweizer Hitparade)	91

== Certifications ==
Region	Certification	Certified units/sales
Austria (IFPI Austria)	Platinum	20,000^{*}
Belgium (BRMA)	Gold	15,000^{*}
Denmark (IFPI Danmark)	Gold	15,000^{^}
Finland (Musiikkituottajat)	Platinum	24,843
France (SNEP)	Gold	50,000^{*}
Germany (BVMI)	7× Gold	700,000^{‡}
Poland (ZPAV)	Gold	10,000^{*}
Romania (UFPR)	4× Platinum	
Russia (NFPF)	2× Platinum	40,000^{*}
Sweden (GLF)	Gold	20,000^{‡}
Switzerland (IFPI Switzerland)	Platinum	30,000^{^}
United Kingdom (BPI)	Silver	60,000^{‡}
Summaries
Europe (IFPI)	Platinum	1,000,000^{*}
^{*} Sales figures based on certification alone.^{^} Shipments figures based on certification alone.^{‡} Sales+streaming figures based on certification alone.

== Release history ==
Country	Date
Europe	16 October 2009
United Kingdom	19 October 2009
United States	20 October 2009
Australia	23 October 2009
New Zealand	23 October 2009
South Africa	23 October 2009
Canada	27 October 2009
Guatemala	4 November 2009
Japan	16 December 2009

== See also ==
- List of certified albums in Romania
