= Haifisch =

2010 song by Rammstein

Single by Rammstein

from the album Liebe ist für alle da
- Released: 28 May 2010
- Recorded: 2009
- Studio: Sonoma Mountain Recording Estate (San Rafael, California)
- Genre: Neue Deutsche Härte
- Length: 3:45
- Label: Universal
- Songwriters: Richard Kruspe; Paul Landers; Till Lindemann; Christian Lorenz; Oliver Riedel; Christoph Schneider
- Producers: Jacob Hellner; Rammstein

Rammstein singles chronology
"Ich tu dir weh" (2010)	"Haifisch" (2010)	"Mein Land" (2011)

Music video
- "Haifisch" on YouTube

"Haifisch" (German pronunciation: [ˈhaɪfɪʃ]; "Shark") is a song by German band Rammstein. It was released on 28 May 2010, as the third single from their 2009 album Liebe ist für alle da. Just before announcing the premiere of the song's video, Rammstein's website left this quote regarding the song: "the shark not only has teeth – he's got tears as well. But since it lives in the briny deep, no one sees them. A shame. After all, this cartilaginous fish is one of the oldest of the world's many misunderstood creatures. A bit more sympathy couldn't hurt!"

The chorus to the song is an allusion to the lyrics of "Mack the Knife", a song written by Berthold Brecht for his play The Threepenny Opera. "Haifisch" reached number 33 on the German singles chart, but left the chart the following week.

== Music video ==
The music video was released on 23 April 2010 on the band's Myspace page.

Shot at Schloss Marquardt near Potsdam, it shows the band at the funeral of the lead singer, Till Lindemann, with some other mourners, one of whom is Marilyn Manson. A fight breaks out between two women who have had Till's children. Meanwhile, the rest of the band contemplate who should replace Lindemann as the singer (Henry Rollins and James Hetfield are suggested, with Hetfield presumably being picked, as his picture was shown more than once, as well as being pointed to by one of the band members).

As the video continues, Lindemann's coffin is lowered into the grave below the inscription "endlich allein" (German: "finally alone") and many scenarios are shown of how Lindemann died, which are all based on previous Rammstein videos: being beaten and set on fire by Christoph Schneider ("Du hast"), having his rope cut while rock climbing by Richard Kruspe ("Ohne dich"), having his oxygen pipe removed from his space suit by Oliver Riedel while on the moon ("Amerika"), and a fat Lindemann being suffocated with spaghetti force-fed to him by Christian Lorenz ("Keine Lust" and Seven). Lorenz also imagines Paul Landers being spanked by Lindemann in a Snow White costume ("Sonne").

There is a reference to the "Ich will" video as Landers opens the French doors to confront Kruspe. Later in the video, the band begins to fight amongst themselves and Lorenz finds himself falling into the grave and breaking open Lindemann's coffin, which is empty. Lindemann, having faked his death, appears having grown a mustache on the island of Oahu, Hawaii, where he sends a postcard to the band that reads "Viele Grüße vom Arsch der Welt" (German: "Greetings from the ass (arse) of the world") and shows that he has caught a tiger shark on what appears to be February 14, 2010, being a prelude leading into the "Mein Land" video.

In two close-ups of writing on Lindemann's coffin, lyrics from other Rammstein songs, Ohne dich, Seemann, and Nebel are seen:

- "Ich werde in die Tannen gehen." from Ohne dich;
- "Am Ende bleib ich doch alleine." from Seemann;
- "Seine Worte frisst der Wind" from Nebel.

It was the first Rammstein video from Liebe ist für alle da not to be premiered on the adult site Visit-X.

== Live performances ==
"Haifisch" made its live debut, as most of Rammstein's songs, during fan exclusive concerts held in Berlin in October 2009, segueing out of Sonne and followed by "Ich will", separating the common duo that has been a feature in the encores since 2001. When played live, the break is extended and a band member (usually Flake, who hadn't performed the stunt in years) surfs the crowd in a rubber dinghy - a feat that previously had been performed during "Stripped", "Seemann" and, occasionally, "Heirate mich". The band member will then proceed to wave a flag of the country that the show is being performed in. Due to this boat ride, the song may reach the 10 minutes mark, almost three times the length of the studio version. This stunt is now performed in "Ausländer" instead of Haifisch.

== Track listing ==
All songs written by Rammstein.

Limited CD single

1. "Haifisch" – 3:46
2. "Haifisch (Haiswing Remix)" by Olsen Involtini – 3:40
3. "Haifisch (Remix by Hurts)" – 3:45
4. "Haifisch (Remix by Schwefelgelb)" – 4:24

12" limited and numbered blue vinyl

1. "Haifisch" – 3:46
2. "Haifisch (Schwefelgelb Remix)" – 4:24

7" limited and numbered blue vinyl

1. "Haifisch" – 3:46
2. "Haifisch (Haiswing Remix)" by Olsen Involtini – 3:40

Digital download

1. "Haifisch" – 3:46
2. "Haifisch (Haiswing Remix)" by Olsen Involtini – 3:40
3. "Haifisch (Hurts Remix)" – 3:45
4. "Haifisch (Schwefelgelb Remix)" – 4:24
5. "Haifisch (Paul Kalkbrenner Remix)" – 3:28
- Includes Digital Booklet

== Chart positions ==
Chart (2010)	Peak position
France (SNEP)	51
Germany (GfK)	33
UK Rock & Metal (Official Charts)	34
