= Ich tu dir weh =

2010 song by Rammstein

Single by Rammstein

from the album Liebe ist für alle da
- B-side: "Remixes"
- Released: 5 February 2010
- Studio: Sonoma Mountain Recording Estate (San Rafael, California)
- Genre: Neue Deutsche Härte
- Length: 5:02
- Label: Universal; Spinefarm
- Songwriters: Richard Kruspe; Paul Landers; Till Lindemann; Christian Lorenz; Oliver Riedel; Christoph Schneider
- Producers: Jacob Hellner; Rammstein

Rammstein singles chronology
"Pussy" (2009)	"Ich tu dir weh" (2010)	"Haifisch" (2010)

Music video
- "Ich tu dir weh" on YouTube

Alternative cover
- Vinyl edition cover

"Ich tu dir weh" (German for "I'm hurting you") is a song by the German Neue Deutsche Härte band Rammstein. It was the second single released from their sixth studio album, Liebe ist für alle da (2009), on 5 February 2010. A music video for the song had previously been released online on 21 December 2009.

The song contains controversial lyrics surrounding sadomasochism. Because of this, Liebe ist für alle da was placed on the "index" maintained by the German BPjM, leading to a forced censored re-release of the album. The Cologne Administrative Court ruled to overturn the censorship on May 31, 2010, determining the band's indexation was unlawful. The Federal Department for Media Harmful to Young Persons (BPjM) officially removed the record from the censorship list the following day, on June 1, 2010.

== Music video ==
The music video for the song was released online on 21 December 2009, hosted on the adult site visit-X. It was directed by Jonas Åkerlund and shows the band performing the song with equipment that has black and gray colors. Both Till Lindemann and Oliver Riedel are wearing eye contacts that eventually turn colors (Riedel's turn green and Lindemann's turn red). Lindemann's mouth also emits a white light when he sings. A cable runs through his cheek and a light is mounted inside his mouth. Lindemann wanted the effect to be authentic, so he had his cheek pierced just for the production. At the climax of the video, the stage around Flake fills with electricity, resulting in the band members exploding at the last note.

== Live performances ==
When played live, large quantities of pyrotechnics are used during "Ich tu dir weh". A choreographed fight takes place mid-song between Lindemann and Flake, which ends with Flake being forced into a large bathtub. Lindemann proceeds to stand on a platform that raises him high above the bathtub, from which he pours a large amount of sparks from a milk can into the bath below. This causes multiple large explosions, after which Flake emerges wearing a silver holographic suit. In the first few German concerts of the Liebe ist für alle da tour, they modified the song's lyrics to allow Lindemann to sing them, because the original lyrics were tagged as inappropriate by the Bundesprüfstelle für jugendgefährdende Medien.

== Track listing ==
All songs written by Rammstein.

=== Limited CD single ===
1. "Ich tu dir weh (Radio Edit)" – 3:57
2. "Pussy (Lick It Remix)" by Scooter – 4:54
3. "Rammlied (Rammin' the Steins Remix)" by Devin Townsend – 5:09
4. "Ich tu dir weh (Smallboy Remix)" by Jochen Schmalbach – 6:42

=== 12" vinyl single ===
1. "Ich tu dir weh (Radio Edit)" – 3:57
2. "Ich tu dir weh (Fukkk Offf Remix)" – 6:07
- The European edition is pressed on black vinyl, the UK edition on white vinyl.

=== 7" single-sided etched vinyl single ===
1. "Ich tu dir weh (Radio Edit)" – 3:57
- The European edition is pressed on black vinyl, the UK edition on red vinyl.

=== Digital download EP ===
1. "Ich tu dir weh" (Radio Edit) – 3:57
2. "Pussy (Lick It Remix)" by Scooter – 4:54
3. "Rammlied (Rammin' the Steins Remix)" by Devin Townsend – 5:09
4. "Ich tu dir weh (Smallboy Remix)" by Jochen Schmalbach – 6:42
5. "Ich tu dir weh (Fukkk Offf Remix)" – 6:07
- Includes digital booklet

== Charts ==
Chart (2010)	Peak position
Austrian Singles Chart	74
French Singles Chart	41
UK Rock Singles Chart	24
