= Pussy (Rammstein song) =

2009 song by Rammstein

Single by Rammstein

from the album Liebe ist für alle da
- B-side: "Rammlied"
- Released: 18 September 2009
- Studio: Sonoma Mountain Recording Estate (San Rafael, California)
- Genre: Neue Deutsche Härte; industrial metal; electro-industrial
- Length: 4:00 (album version); 3:48 (radio edit)
- Label: Universal; Spinefarm
- Songwriters: Richard Kruspe; Paul Landers; Till Lindemann; Christian Lorenz; Oliver Riedel; Christoph Schneider
- Producers: Jacob Hellner; Rammstein

Rammstein singles chronology
"Mann gegen Mann" (2006)	"Pussy" (2009)	"Ich tu dir weh" (2010)

"Pussy" is a song by German Neue Deutsche Härte band Rammstein. It was released as the lead single from the band's sixth studio album, Liebe ist für alle da (2009) on 18 September 2009. The song was released with a controversial and sexually explicit music video in which the band members, portrayed by body-doubles during some of the close ups of specific body parts, are seen having sex with women.

The first promotional video for the single was released online on 16 September 2009 at the Gauntlet. The video also confirmed the new album title.

"Pussy" was Rammstein's first number one single in Germany. The song was remixed by Scooter, a fellow German artist, and the remix later appeared on the "Ich tu dir weh" single. It was the first Rammstein song to be released after their three-year hiatus.

== Music video ==
The video was directed by Jonas Åkerlund and released online on 16 September 2009. The video features the band playing the song wearing leather outfits, interspersed with six hardcore pornographic videos featuring each of the band members as a different stereotypical pornographic character: Till as the playboy, Christoph as the CEO, Paul as the cowboy, Oliver as Mr. Pain (a BDSM fetishist), Richard as the party boy, and Flake as the shemale. Each scene features a band member engaging in foreplay with a different woman, and the scenes become more explicit as the video progresses until they engage into unsimulated sexual intercourse with graphic nudity. However, some body doubles were used. At the end of the video, the band members ejaculate.

== Lyrics ==
The lyrics are partially in English and deal with sex tourism with lines like "Alleine in das Ausland fahren" ("drive alone to a foreign country") and "I can't get laid in Germany". A mention of the Autobahn and the seemingly nonsensical line "Reise, Reise, Fahrvergnügen" are a reference to appearances of German culture in American commercialism (the latter from a Volkswagen advertising campaign, the former from one of Rammstein's own previous albums). Together, these aspects of the song create a contrast between the sexual mores of German society and that of America.

== Live performances ==
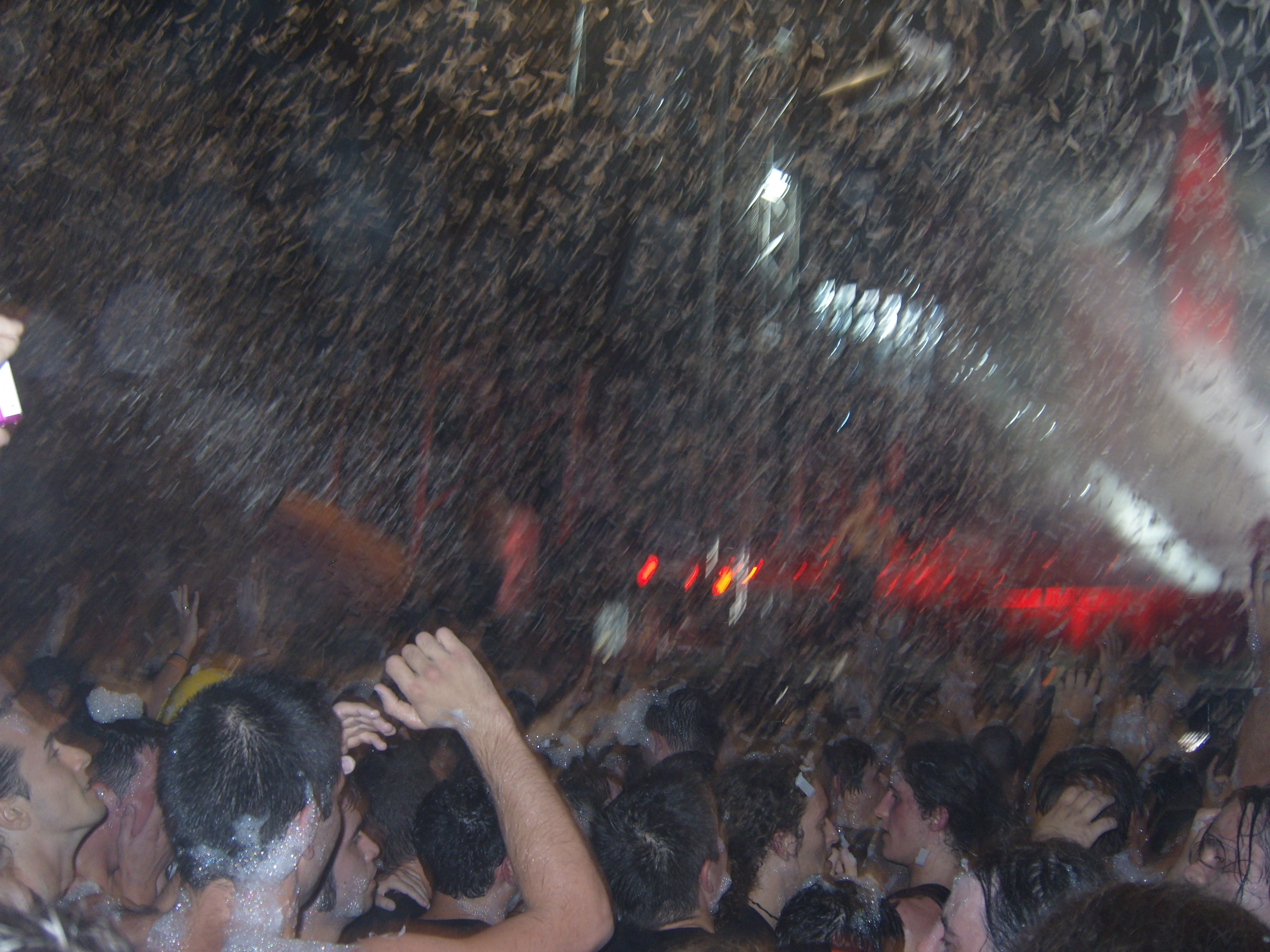
Live performance of "Pussy" in Italy

"Pussy" debuted live, as most of Rammstein's songs, during fan exclusive concerts held in Berlin in October 2009. "Pussy" was the last song of the main set of the Liebe ist für alle da tour, and continues to be in the Made in Germany tour. The song was dropped temporarily from the setlist in the middle of the 2023 leg of the Rammstein Stadium Tour due to sexual assault allegations against singer Till Lindemann.

== Track listings ==
CD

No.	Title	Length
1.	"Pussy" (radio edit)	3:48
2.	"Rammlied"	5:19

Vinyl

No.	Title	Length
1.	"Pussy"	4:00
2.	"Rammlied"	5:19

- The 7" vinyl edition only contains "Pussy".

== Versions ==
Single version	Tracks	Notes
Limited edition digipak single	2 tracks	CD+poster combo
Limited edition hand-numbered single	2 tracks	12" vinyl
Limited edition etch-numbered single	Pussy	7" vinyl; special Viagra blue color

== Release history ==
Country	Date
Europe	18 September 2009
United States	22 September 2009

== Charts ==
=== Weekly charts ===
Chart (2009)	Peak position
Austria (Ö3 Austria Top 40)	4
Belgium (Ultratop 50 Flanders)	34
Denmark (Tracklisten)	37
Eurochart Hot 100	6
Finnish Singles Chart	1
French Singles Chart	13
German Singles Chart	1
Netherlands (Single Top 100)	18
Norway (VG-Lista)	16
Swedish Singles Chart	22
Swiss Singles Chart	12
UK Singles Chart	95
UK Rock Chart	2

=== Year-end charts ===
Country	Position
Germany	42

== Legal issues ==
On April 28, 2021, the former coordinator for the Arkhangelsk offices of anti-corruption politician Alexei Navalny, Andrei Borovikov was sentenced to 2.5 years for sharing the music video on VKontakte back in 2014. However, the charges were only issued six years after the initial posting and only then after the original post had been deleted and only seen by two of his closest friends. He was charged with breaking Article 242(3)(b), "production and distribution of pornography," a charge which is disputed to be politically motivated. Natalia Zviagina, the director of Amnesty International's Moscow office, described the charges as "utterly absurd" and clearly politically motivated. Previously, in September 2019 he was sentenced to 400 hours of community service over his involvement with peaceful, anti-landfill demonstrations, a violation of Article 212.1.
