= Mann gegen Mann =

2006 song by Rammstein

Single by Rammstein

from the album Rosenrot
- Released: 3 March 2006
- Recorded: 2005
- Studio: Teldex Studio (Berlin)
- Genre: Neue Deutsche Härte; industrial metal
- Length: 3:51
- Label: Universal
- Songwriters: Richard Kruspe; Paul Landers; Till Lindemann; Christian Lorenz; Oliver Riedel; Christoph Schneider
- Producers: Jacob Hellner; Rammstein

Rammstein singles chronology
"Rosenrot" (2005)	"Mann gegen Mann" (2006)	"Pussy" (2009)

Music video
- "Mann gegen Mann" on YouTube

"Mann gegen Mann" (German: [ˈman ɡeːɡn̩ ˈman]; "Man Against Man") is a song by the German Neue Deutsche Härte band Rammstein, released in March 2006 as the third and final single from the band's fifth studio album, Rosenrot. The song's narrative portrays a man with strong homosexual desires, and it is the first Rammstein music video to feature nudity since the video for their cover of Depeche Mode's "Stripped".

== Background and songwriting ==
The text, which deals with the subject of homosexuality in terms of content, remains largely ambiguous in its message, dealing with both homophilia and homophobia. This is quite intentional, as Paul Landers and Oliver Riedel explained in an interview:

We definitely didn't intend to write a gay anthem. Of course it is a critical topic how a heterosexual person deals with the topic of a homosexual person. Maybe we can contribute to defusing the word 'gay' a bit and relativise the negative touch.

— Oliver Riedel

This ambiguity is achieved through artificial elements consisting of complex but open-ended linguistic images and allusions, for example: Ich nehm mein Schicksal in die Hand/Mein Verlangen ist bemannt ("I take my fate into my own hands/My desire is manned") or In meiner Kette fehlt kein Glied/Wenn die Lust von hinten zieht ("In my chain no link is missing/When lust pulls from behind"). In the further lyrics of the song, homophobia is also made an issue several times. Negative views of homosexuality are also presented in three two-liners: Mein Geschlecht schimpft mich Verräter/Ich bin der Alptraum aller Väter ("My gender calls me traitor/I am the nightmare of all fathers"). In between, the negatively connoted German exclamation Schwule! ("Gays!") also occurs.

In the process, the first four stanzas create a quasi-homosexual utopia with partly subtle but also relatively clear allusions. Thus in Trag ich den kleinen Prinz im Sinn / Ein König ohne Königin ("I keep the Little Prince in mind / A king without a queen"), "little prince" is a symbol for the penis, but also for the object of desire in contrast to the queen. At the same time, it is an allusion to The Little Prince (1943), a novella written by the French writer and aviator Antoine de Saint-Exupéry. Rammstein singer Till Lindemann uses a deliberately soft singing style that differs from his otherwise masculine singing voice. The chorus, which is much more expressive and aggressive, uses everyday language, including the phrase Gleich und gleich gesellt sich gern ("Birds of a feather flock together").

Christian Diemer, musicologist and Germanist, subjected both the music video and the lyrics to a deeper hermeneutic examination, and came to the following conclusion:

The text-based findings indicate that contrary expressions of opinion of varying degrees of explicitness and diffuseness are staged, partly in clearly assigned textual elements, partly on the micro-level of ambiguity and metaphors. [...] There are widely varying degrees of concreteness and diffuseness on the one hand and of affirmation and rejection on the other.

— Christian Diemer

== Music video ==
The music video, directed by Jonas Åkerlund, premiered on MTV Germany on 2 February 2006. It shows the band members performing on a dark stage while almost entirely naked, aside from frontman Till Lindemann, who wears long black hair extensions, thigh-high feminine high-heeled boots, and a set of black latex briefs. The rest of the band members wear only black army boots, with their instruments covering their genitals. The video alternates between the band playing and scenes of a writhing group of naked, muscular, oiled men on the same dark stage. It starts to rain on the band during the bridge of the song, and a frenzied Lindemann screams as a forked tongue flicks from his mouth. The tempo of the song then changes to a melodic pace as the band members then crowd-surf over the oiled and naked men. Lindemann becomes a kind of winged demon, with the hands and arms of naked men reaching up towards him and worshipping him; the song's tempo changes back to its frenzied pace. The group of men with the band members begin to wrestle and fight with one another as it rains on them. Screaming again, Lindemann starts to rip his hair out as the song closes.

== Track listings ==
=== 2-track UK CD single ===
1. "Mann gegen Mann" – 3:52
2. "Rosenrot (The Tweaker Remix)" by Chris Vrenna – 4:34

=== Enhanced CD single ===
1. "Mann gegen Mann" – 3:51
2. "Mann gegen Mann (Popular Music Mix)" by Vince Clarke – 4:06
3. "Mann gegen Mann (Musensohn Remix)" by Sven Helbig – 3:12
4. "Ich will" (live video at Festival de Nîmes) – 4:02
- Also released as a 2-track CD featuring "Mann gegen Mann" and "Mann gegen Mann (Popular Music Mix)"

=== Australian version ===
1. "Mann gegen Mann" – 3:52
2. "Mann gegen Mann (Popular Music Mix)" by Vince Clarke – 4:06
3. "Mann gegen Mann (Musensohn Remix)" by Sven Helbig – 3:12
4. "Mann gegen Mann (Type O Remix)" by Josh Silver – 3:59

=== 12" vinyl single ===
1. "Mann gegen Mann" – 3:52
2. "Rosenrot (3am at Cosey Remix)" by Jagz Kooner – 4:50

=== 2-track promo CD ===
1. "Mann gegen Mann (Futurist Remix)" by Alec Empire – 3:53
2. "Mann gegen Mann (Popular Music Mix)" by Vince Clarke – 4:06

=== 12" promo vinyl ===
1. "Mann gegen Mann (Futurist Remix)" by Alec Empire – 3:53
2. "Mann gegen Mann (Popular Music Mix)" by Vince Clarke – 4:06

== Charts ==
Chart (2006)	Peak position
Austria (Ö3 Austria Top 40)	42
Belgium (Ultratop 50 Flanders)	10
Denmark (Tracklisten)	5
Finland (Suomen virallinen lista)	18
Germany (GfK)	20
Netherlands (Single Top 100)	35
Hungary (Single Top 40)	6
Scotland Singles (Official Charts)	39
Sweden (Sverigetopplistan)	45
Switzerland (Schweizer Hitparade)	66
UK Singles (Official Charts)	59
UK Rock & Metal (Official Charts)	2
Venezuela Pop Rock (Record Report)	1
