= Benzin =

2005 song by Rammstein

Single by Rammstein

from the album Rosenrot
- Released: 7 October 2005
- Recorded: Teldex Studio, Berlin
- Genre: Neue Deutsche Härte, industrial metal
- Length: 3:47
- Label: Universal
- Songwriters: Richard Kruspe, Paul Landers, Till Lindemann, Christian Lorenz, Oliver Riedel, Christoph Schneider
- Producers: Jacob Hellner and Rammstein

Rammstein singles chronology
"Keine Lust" (2005)	"Benzin" (2005)	"Rosenrot" (2005)

Music video
- "Benzin" on YouTube

"Benzin" (German pronunciation: [bɛnˈtsiːn]; "Gasoline" or "Petrol") is a song by German industrial metal band Rammstein, released as the first single from their album Rosenrot.

In Germany, gasoline is called Benzin (which is derived from the chemical mixture benzine). The song uses the word "Gasolin", however the word does not exist in the German language, but it is an English word made German. There was, however, a German chain of gas stations called "Gasolin."

== Music video ==
In the video, Rammstein are firefighters. They have not had a call for a long time, and are thus very ill-equipped for dealing with an emergency. They enter a huge, three-lane-wide fire-engine, and set off on their journey, not taking any notice of the damage they are causing, or the people they are killing. They plow through high-voltage power-lines, trains, trees and normal road vehicles; despite this, the truck remains unscratched. During the journey, the scene changes to a fantasy by guitarist Paul H. Landers, during which he saves a "damsel-in-distress" from a burning building. During this fantasy, the band members are seen playing their instruments in the background amongst the smoke. The scene returns to the Fire-engine, plowing through traffic and buildings before it overturns and sends the band-members crashing through the windscreen. As Till comes round, a man points to the top of a nearby building. It dawns on them that they have crashed right outside the emergency. They scramble to get a safety trampoline out for the jumper, who happens to be Christian "Flake" Lorenz. The trampoline rips just as he jumps, at which point the video ends, implying the man's death seconds later - the actual event likely considered too graphic to include - and thus the destruction up to that point having achieved nothing.

== Live performances ==
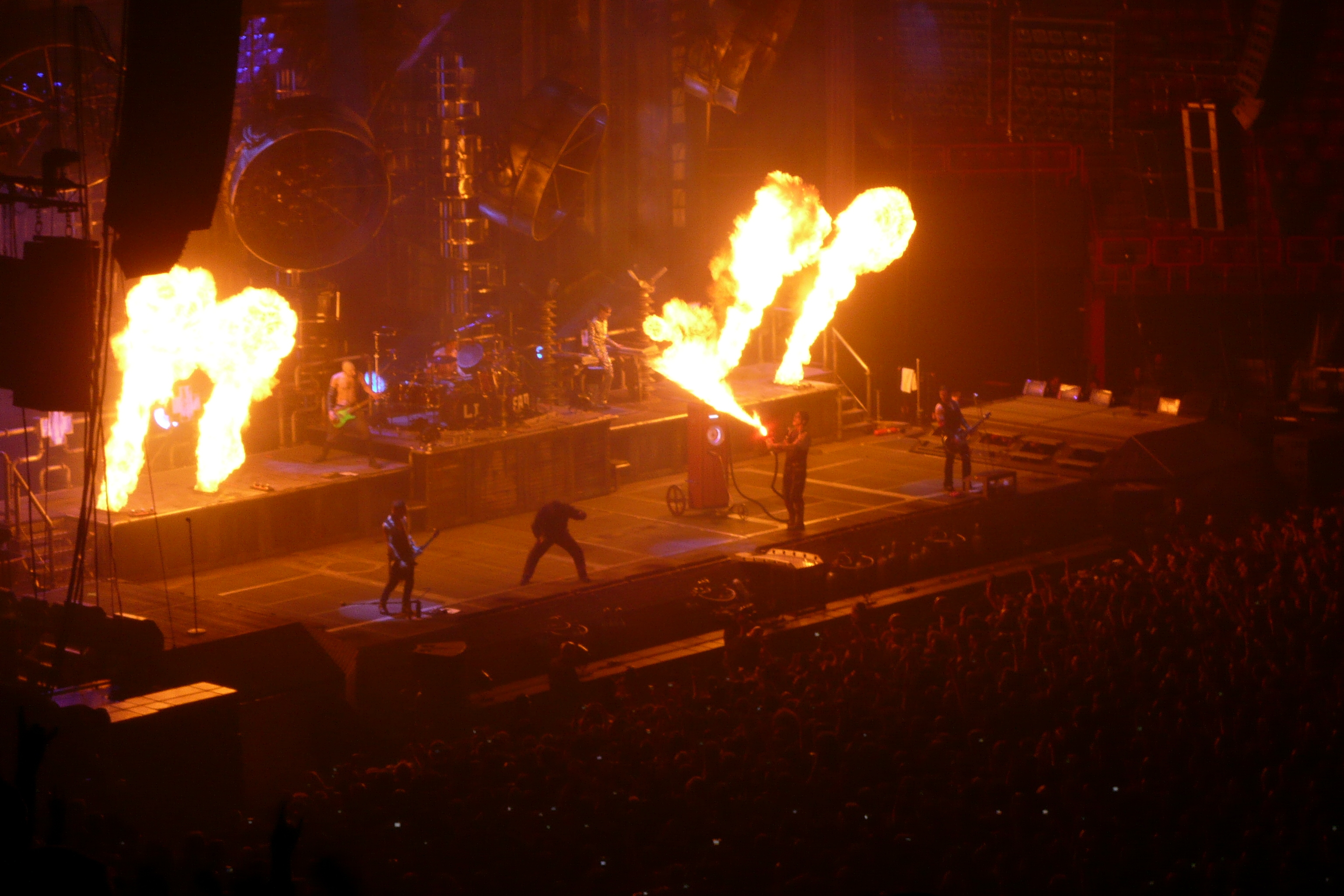
Benzin performed live at Bercy (Paris), 2009

The song was first played live in the Reise, Reise tour on 23 June 2005 in Berlin's Wuhlheide , months before its release. It replaced Moskau on the setlist. Benzin was played on the next two nights, lyrics changing a little bit even from one night to the next. Theatrical flames shot twenty metres into the air during those live performances. It was then played in the non-festival concerts until the end of the tour, but this time without any pyrotechnics. However, as of the Liebe Ist Für Alle Da tour, Benzin has returned to being performed with pyrotechnics, including a flamethrower disguised as a petrol pump. By the end of the song Till Lindemann uses it to set a 'fan' on fire, who runs through the stage until the song is over.

== Track listing ==
All songs by Rammstein.

1. Benzin - 3:47
2. Benzin (Combustion Remix) by Meshuggah - 5:05
3. Benzin (Smallstars Remix) by Ad Rock - 3:45
4. Benzin (Kerosinii Remix) by Apocalyptica - 3:48

== Charts ==
Chart (2005)	Peak position
Austria (Ö3 Austria Top 40)	11
Belgium (Ultratop 50 Flanders)	41
Belgium (Ultratop 50 Wallonia)	33
Denmark (Tracklisten)	3
Europe (Eurochart Hot 100)	15
Finland (Suomen virallinen lista)	1
France (SNEP)	81
Germany (GfK)	6
Hungary (Single Top 40)	9
Italy (FIMI)	31
Netherlands (Single Top 100)	35
Norway (VG-lista)	15
Scotland Singles (OCC)	46
Spain (PROMUSICAE)	3
Sweden (Sverigetopplistan)	16
Switzerland (Schweizer Hitparade)	15
UK Singles (OCC)	58
UK Rock & Metal (OCC)	1
