= Die anderen Bands =

Die anderen Bands (German: [diː ˈʔandəʁən ˈbants], "the other bands") is a term combining alternative music bands of 1980s GDR (East Germany). They shared a more or less open criticism of their country's political system, and a high degree of creativity which was lacking from the more established music scene of East Germany. Many members of these bands played significant parts during the time of political change Wende in 1989. The bands came from a broad range of musical genres, especially Punk, Blues, New Wave, Indie and Electronic music.

Radio DJ Lutz Schramm introduced the other bands to a wider audience in his show Parocktikum on East Germany's youth radio station DT 64 (now Sputnik/MDR). In 1988 the East German record label AMIGA released a sampler called "Kleeblatt Nr. 23 - Die anderen Bands". A year later another sampler was released, named after the radio show their music was first aired in: "Parocktikum". Having been limited to self-produced records and (sometimes illegal) gigs, both the radio show and the samplers offered a great opportunity for alternative bands to promote their material. The old system prevented free performances, only bands with an "Einstufung" (rating) were able to have an official approved gig. From 1990 on several samplers with alternative bands from the former GDR were released. Most of the bands are now defunct, but some like Dekadance, Freygang and Herbst in Peking still exist. Other musicians have found fame in new bands such as Rammstein, whose band members have formerly been in Feeling B and First Arsch

== Bands ==
- Dekadance
- Dritte Wahl
- Feeling B
- First Arsch
- Herbst in Peking
- Die Skeptiker

== Sources ==
- Ronald Galenza, Heinz Havemeister (eds.): „Wir wollen immer artig sein…“ Punk, New Wave, Hiphop und Independent-Szene in der DDR von 1980 bis 1990. (2nd revised and expanded edition, including a virtually complete discography of all recordings of alternative DDR bands on state and independent labels) Schwarzkopf und Schwarzkopf, Berlin 2005 ISBN 3896026372
- Alexander Pehlemann, Ronald Galenza (eds.): Spannung. Leistung. Widerstand. Magnetbanduntergrund. DDR 1979–1990. Verbrecher Verlag, Berlin 2006 ISBN 3935843763
- Mirko M. Hall, Seth Howes, Cyrus M. Shahan: Beyond No Future: Cultures of German Punk. Bloomsbury Publishing USA, 2016
- Juliane Fürst, Josie McLellan: Dropping out of Socialism: The Creation of Alternative Spheres in the Soviet Bloc. Rowman & Littlefield, 2016
