= Rosenrot (song) =

2005 song by Rammstein

Single by Rammstein

from the album Rosenrot
- Released: 16 December 2005
- Recorded: El Cortijo Studio, Málaga, 2003
- Genre: Neue Deutsche Härte, industrial metal
- Length: 4:24
- Label: Universal
- Songwriters: Richard Kruspe; Paul Landers; Till Lindemann; Christian Lorenz; Oliver Riedel; Christoph Schneider
- Producers: Jacob Hellner; Rammstein

Rammstein singles chronology
"Benzin" (2005)	"Rosenrot" (2005)	"Mann gegen Mann" (2006)

Music video
- "Rosenrot" on YouTube

"Rosenrot" (German for "Rose-red") is a song by German industrial metal band Rammstein. It was released on 16 December 2005, as the second single from the band's album of the same name.

The song was highly anticipated by fans of Rammstein, as it was first hailed in February 2004 to be the first single from the band's fourth studio album, Reise, Reise (the song "Mein Teil" took the honour instead).

== Content ==
The lyrics tell of a man who is asked by his lover to retrieve a rose from a mountain, and falls to his death.

The lyrics contain elements from Johann Wolfgang von Goethe's poem "Heidenröslein" (while his poem "Erlkönig" similarly inspired the Reise, Reise track, "Dalai Lama"), and the story "Schneeweißchen und Rosenrot," from the Brothers Grimm. Till also seldom uses his trademark rolled R's in the song, uniquely among the band's discography.

The song features riffs used previously in "Stein um Stein".

== Music video ==
The video was filmed at Măgura (near Brașov), Romania, and portrays the band as six travelling monks who have come to a small village. The main story of the video shows one of the monks (played by vocalist Till Lindemann) falling in love with one of the local girls (played by then-14 year old Romanian model Cătălina Lavric), whom he meets during a feast. At her request, he enters her house and murders her parents. As he leaves the house, the girl briefly smiles at him before she alarms the villagers, who grab him and burn him at the stake. These scenes are intercut with the other monks, played by the band's other members, engaging in self-flagellation as an act of contrition. In the end, the remaining five monks leave the village.

== Track listing ==
1. "Rosenrot (Single Edit)" – 3:47
2. "Rosenrot (The Tweaker Remix)" by Chris Vrenna – 4:34
3. "Rosenrot (Northern Lite Remix)" by Northern Lite – 4:45
4. "Rosenrot (3am At Cosy Remix)" by Jagz Kooner – 4:50
- Two 2-track CD releases feature slightly different track lists:
  - "Rosenrot (Single Edit)" and "Rosenrot (Northern Lite Remix)"
  - "Rosenrot (Single Version)" and "Rosenrot (Northern Lite Remix)"

== Chart positions ==
Chart (2005)	Peak position
Austria (Ö3 Austria Top 40)	46
Belgium (Ultratop 50 Flanders)	12
Denmark (Tracklisten)	8
Germany (GfK)	28
Netherlands (Single Top 100)	43
Spain (PROMUSICAE)	13
Sweden (Sverigetopplistan)	53
Switzerland (Schweizer Hitparade)	59
