= Herbst in Peking =

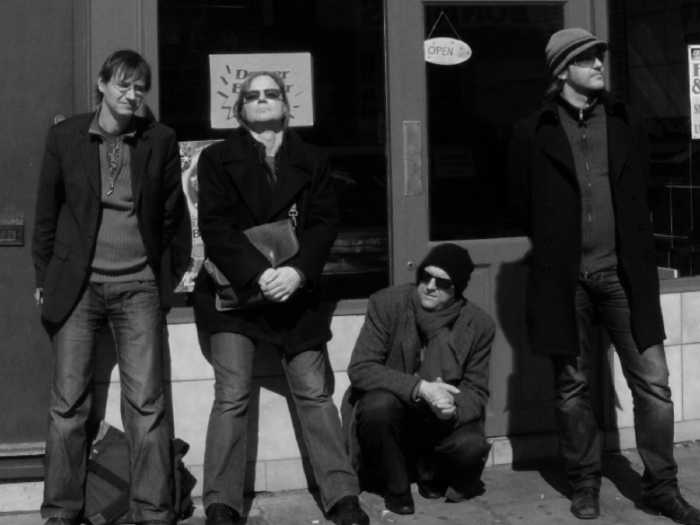
- Herbst in Peking 2009

Background information
- Origin: East Berlin, East Germany
- Genres: Indie-Rock; Dub
- Years active: 1987–present
- Members: Rex Joswig; Alexander Istschenko; Tom Krimi
- Past members: Torsten “Dr. Totenhöfer“ Ratheischak; Benno Verch; Torsten “Pegman“ Füchsel; Hans Narva; Frank “Trötsch“ Tröger; Mircea Ionascu; Torsten Beckmann; Titus Jany

Herbst in Peking (Autumn in Beijing) is a band from Germany. It was formed in 1987 in East Berlin by singer and mastermind Rex Joswig and keyboard player Dr Totenhöfer. Completing the band were Alexander Istschenko (guitar), Hans "Tomato" Narva (bass) and Benno Verch (drums). The band was one of Die anderen Bands who openly expressed their social and political criticism in lyrics and music. The name was derived from a book of the same title by French author Boris Vian. Fearing copyright problems they only used the abbreviation "H.I.P." in official correspondence. Their live shows featured a weird mix of Russian, Chinese and Eastern European influenced personality cult. The lyrics were sung partly in German, English and Russian.

Shortly after the Tiananmen Square Massacre in Beijing in May 1989 they lost their licence to play. This was due to Joswig's appeal for a minute of silence for the victims of the massacre during a previous concert. The band became irrelevant when East Germany collapsed in autumn the same year. The Herbst in Peking song "Bakschischrepublik" became the hymn of East Germany's Rock music scene during the Wende. The lyrics included the line "Schwarz-Rot-Gold ist das System - morgen wird es untergehen" (Black-red-golden is the system - tomorrow it will fall).

Unusually (for an East German band at this time), the recording received airplay in the UK from Radio 1 DJ, John Peel. Peel had received a copy of the single in the post, and he played it on several occasions in the winter of 1989 and spring of 1990.

During the 90s the musical style of the band changed considerably, and their punk rock songs were now heavily influenced by dub, electronic music and industrial; spoken word tracks appeared on their records too. From 1991 to 1998 band mastermind Rex Joswig presented a radio show called Grenzpunkt Null (Border Point Zero) at the East German radio station DT 64 (later MDR Sputnik). Herbst in Peking concerts became more and more rare while the band line-up changed too. The last official Herbst in Peking gig was performed by Rex Joswig in May 2006 in Berlin's club Kaffee Burger.

Herbst in Peking reformed in autumn 2008 and are back in the studio and on the road.

== Current Lineup ==
- Rex Joswig (vocals)
- Alexander Istschenko (electronics and guitar)
- Tom Krimi (guitars)

== Records ==
- Bakschischrepublik (7", 1989)
- To Be H.I.P. (1990)
- Terrible Herbst (1993)
- Das Jahr Schnee (EP, 1996)
- Merry X-Mas (EP, 1996)
- Feuer Wasser & Posaunen (EP, 1997) Record Review
- La Dolce Vita (EP, 1998)
- Les Fleurs du Mal (1999) Record Review
- German Fool (EP, 2004) Download
- All Nights Reserved (2009)
- The Tyger & the Fly (EP, 2014)
- Splitter der Schöpfung (CD, 2016)
