= Zunge Tour =

2023–24 concert tour by Till Lindemann

- Tour by Till Lindemann
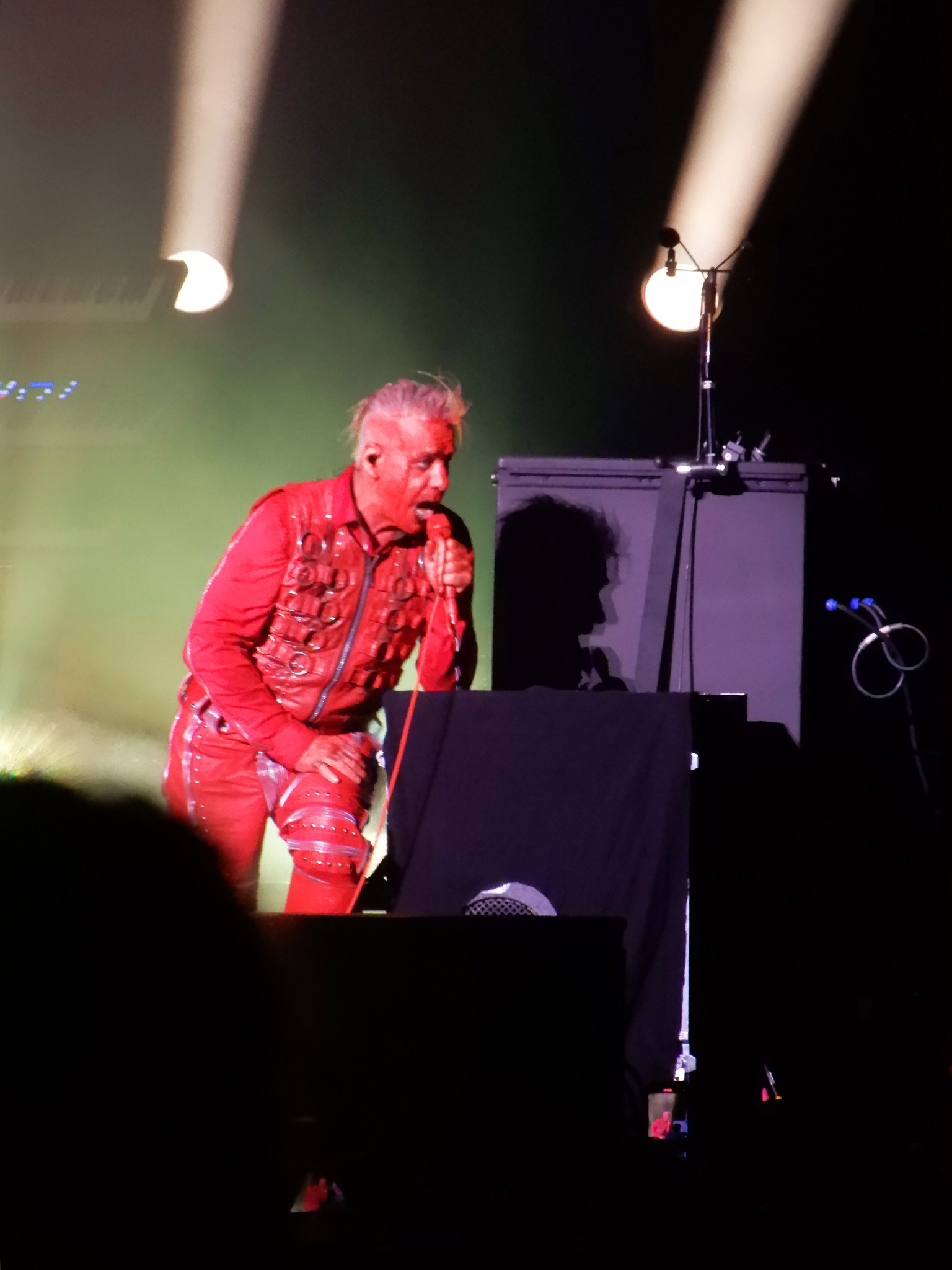
- Location: Brazil; Europe; North America
- Associated album: Zunge
- Start date: 8 November 2023
- End date: 20 October 2024
- Legs: 4
- No. of shows: 57

Till Lindemann concert chronology
- Zunge Tour (2023–2024); Meine Welt Tour (2025)

The Zunge Tour was a concert tour by German singer Till Lindemann, in support of his debut solo album, Zunge, which was released a few days before the start of the tour. The tour was under the critical observation of the media and the public, as the singer was accused the same year of systematic abuse of power and drugging of women at and after Rammstein and Lindemann concerts. It began on 8 November 2023, in Leipzig and ended on 20 October 2024 in São Paulo in Brazil.

Lindemann played mostly in Europe and North America, but also three concerts in Mexico and one concert in Brazil.

== Background ==
At the end of April 2023, the singer announced his new tour, which was initially limited to Europe but was later extended to Mexico.

In the course of the same year, Lindemann announced his debut solo album Zunge and released five new singles and three music videos. It quickly became known that the album would be self-distributed, as Universal and Lindemann decided not to release it together due to the accusations against him. For this reason, the album could only be bought at Lindemann's concerts and later in the Rammstein store.

Protests against Lindemann's appearance took place outside the venues in Germany and no journalists were allowed during the first concert in Leipzig.

The North American leg began on 17 September 2024 in San Antonio, and was supported by Twin Temple and Aesthetic Perfection. Lindemann also performed at the festivals Knotfest Iowa, and Louder Than Life.

== Set list ==
=== Europe ===
This set list is from the concert in Leipzig on 8 November 2023 and does not represent the entire tour.

1. "Zunge"
2. "Schweiss"
3. "Fat"
4. "Altes Fleisch"
5. "Allesfresser"
6. "Golden Shower"
7. "Tanzlehrerin"
8. "Ich weiß es nicht"
9. "Sport Frei"
10. "Blut"
11. "Praise Abort"
12. "Platz Eins"
13. "Fish On"
14. "Gummi"
15. "Steh Auf"
16. "Knebel"
17. "Ich hasse Kinder"
18. "Skills in Pills"

=== North America ===
This set list is from the concert in San Antonio on 17 September 2024 and is not intended to represent the majority of performances throughout the tour.

1. "Zunge"
2. "Schweiss"
3. "Fat"
4. "Altes Fleisch"
5. "Allesfresser"
6. "Ladyboy"
7. "Golden Shower"
8. "Sport frei"
9. "Blut"
10. "Praise Abort"
11. "Platz Eins"
12. "Fish On"
13. "Steh auf"
14. "Entre dos tierras" (Héroes del Silencio cover)
15. "Skills in Pills"
16. "Knebel"
17. "Du hast kein Herz"
18. "Ich hasse Kinder"
19. "Home Sweet Home"

== Tour dates ==
List of 2023 concerts, showing date, city, country, venue, tickets sold, number of available tickets and gross revenue
Date	City	Country	Venue	Attendance	Revenue
8 November	Leipzig	Germany	Quarterback Immobilien Arena	—	—
10 November	Düsseldorf	Germany	Mitsubishi Electric Halle	—	—
12 November	Münster	Germany	MCC Halle Münsterland	—	—
14 November	Bamberg	Germany	Brose Arena	—	—
15 November	Lingen	Germany	Emslandarena	—	—
17 November	Frankfurt	Germany	MyTicket Jahrhunderthalle	—	—
20 November	Trier	Germany	SWT Arena	—	—
22 November	Prague	Czech Republic	Tipsport Arena	—	—
24 November	Bratislava	Slovakia	NTC aréna	—	—
26 November	Katowice	Poland	Spodek	—	—
28 November	Kaunas	Lithuania	Zalgirio Arena	—	—
30 November	Riga	Latvia	Arena Riga	—	—
2 December	Tallinn	Estonia	Tondiraba Ice Hall	—	—
3 December	Helsinki	Finland	Ice Hall	—	—
5 December	Stockholm	Sweden	Hovet	—	—
6 December	Malmö	Sweden	Malmö Arena	—	—
8 December	Hamburg	Germany	Sporthalle	—	—
10 December	Antwerp	Belgium	Lotto Arena	—	—
12 December	London	England	OVO Wembley Arena	—	—
14 December	Rotterdam	Netherlands	RTM Stage	—	—
16 December	Stuttgart	Germany	Porsche Arena	—	—
18 December	Munich	Germany	Zenith	—	—
20 December	Paris	France	Accor Arena	—	—
31 December	Guadalajara	Mexico	Guanamor Teatro Studio	—	—

List of 2024 concerts, showing date, city, country, venue, tickets sold, number of available tickets and gross revenue
Date	City	Country	Venue	Attendance	Revenue
2 January	Monterrey	Mexico	Showcenter	—	—
4 January	San Luis Potosí	Mexico	Centro de las Artes	—	—
17 September	San Antonio	United States	Boeing Center at Tech Port	—	—
19 September	Dallas	United States	The Factory in Deep Ellum	—	—
21 September (Note: The 21 September 2024, concert was a part of Knotfest Iowa.)	Des Moines	United States	Waterworks Park	—N/a	—N/a
23 September	Detroit	United States	The Fillmore	—	—
25 September	Silver Spring	United States	The Fillmore	—	—
28 September (Note: The 28 September 2024, concert was a part of Louder Than Life.)	Louisville	United States	Highland Festival Grounds	—N/a	—N/a
29 September	Chicago	United States	Byline Bank Aragon Ballroom	—	—
1 October	New York City	United States	The Rooftop at Pier 17	—	—
3 October	Toronto	Canada	The Theatre at Great Canadian Casino Resort	—	—
5 October	Minneapolis	United States	Myth Live	—	—
7 October	Denver	United States	Mission Ballroom	—	—
10 October (Note: The 10 October 2024, concert was a part of Aftershock Festival.)	Sacramento	United States	Discovery Park	—N/a	—N/a
12 October	Phoenix	United States	Rawhide Event Center	—	—
14 October	Inglewood	United States	Kia Forum	—	—
20 October (Note: The 20 October 2024, concert was a part of Knotfest Brasil.)	São Paulo	Brazil	Allianz Parque	—N/a	—N/a
Total				—	—

=== Canceled tour dates ===
Date	City	Country	Venue	Reason
8 September 2023	Alton	United States	Blue Ridge Rock Fest	Illness
18 November 2023	Kassel	Germany	Nordhessen Arena	Concerns about fire safety
31 December 2023	Cancún	Mexico	Plaza de Toros	Moved to Guadalajara
31 December 2023	Guadalajara	Mexico	Pabellón Cultural Universitario	Moved to Guanamor Teatro Studio
