= Meine Welt Tour =

2025 concert tour by Till Lindemann

- Tour by Till Lindemann
- Location: Europe
- Start date: 13 June 2025
- End date: 4 July 2026
- Legs: 3
- No. of shows: 51

Till Lindemann concert chronology
- Zunge Tour (2023–2024); Meine Welt Tour (2025–2026); World Tour 2027

The Meine Welt Tour is a concert tour by German singer Till Lindemann.

== Background ==
The tour was announced on 11 November 2024, which stated would start at the end of October to December 2025, and would be performed in arenas in seventeen countries. On November 13, 2024, dates for twenty shows were announced two days after the tour was announced. At the same time, a series of festivals was also announced for 2025.

Meine Welt Tour Stage in Leipzig

== Set list ==
The following set list was performed in Leipzig, Germany on 29 October 2025. It is not intended to represent a majority of the performances throughout the tour.

1. "Fat"
2. "Und die Engel singen"
3. "Schweiss"
4. "Altes Fleisch"
5. "Golden Shower"
6. "Sport Frei"
7. "Tanzlehrerin"
8. "Blut"
9. "Allesfresser"
10. "Prostitution"
11. "Praise Abort"
12. "Du hast kein Herz"
13. "Skills in Pills"
  Encore
14. "Fish On"
15. "Übers Meer"
16. "Knebel (shortend)
17. "Ich hasse Kinder"

== Tour dates ==
List of 2025 shows
Date (2025)	City	Country	Venue	Attendance	Revenue
13 June (Note: The 13 June 2025, concert was a part of Rockfest.)	Turku	Finland	Artukaisten kenttä	—N/a	—N/a
19 June (Note: The 19 June 2025, concert was a part of Hellfest.)	Clisson	France	Val de Moine	—N/a	—N/a
21 June (Note: The 21 June 2025, concert was a part of OpenR Festival.)	Uelzen	Germany	Albrecht Thaer Gelände	—N/a	—N/a
22 June (Note: The 22 June 2025, concert was a part of Graspop Metal Meeting.)	Dessel	Belgium	Festivalpark Stenehei	—N/a	—N/a
26 June (Note: The 26 June 2025, concert was a part of Resurrection Fest.)	Galicia	Spain	Campo de fútbol Celeiro	—N/a	—N/a
28 June (Note: The 28 June 2025, concert was a part of EVILLIVE Festival.)	Lisbon	Portugal	Estádio do Restelo	—N/a	—N/a
29 June (Note: The 29 June 2025, concert was a part of Rock Imperium Festival.)	Cartagena	Spain	Parque de la Cuesta del Batel	—N/a	—N/a
4 July (Note: The 4 July 2025, concert was a part of openERFURT.)	Erfurt	Germany	Messegelände	—N/a	—N/a
6 July (Note: The 6 July 2025, concert was a part of Lucca Summer Festival.)	Lucca	Italy	Piazza Napoleone	—N/a	—N/a
11 July (Note: The 11 July 2025, concert was a part of Masters of Rock.)	Vizovice	Czech Republic	Areál Likérky Rudolf Jelínek	—N/a	—N/a
29 October	Leipzig	Germany	Quarterback Immobilien Arena	—	—
31 October	Amsterdam	Netherlands	Ziggo Dome	—	—
2 November	Antwerp	Belgium	Sportpalais	—	—
4 November	London	England	OVO Arena Wembley	—	—
6 November	Frankfurt	Germany	Festhalle	—	—
8 November	Dortmund	Germany	Westfalenhalle	—	—
10 November	Dresden	Germany	Messe Dresden	—	—
12 November	Barcelona	Spain	Sant Jordi Club	—	—
15 November	Madrid	Spain	Palacio Vistalegre	—	—
20 November	Paris	France	Adidas Arena	—	—
17 November	Lisbon	Portugal	MEO ARENA	—	—
21 November	Düsseldorf	Germany	PSD Bank Dome	—	—
23 November	Hamburg	Germany	Barclays Arena	—	—
25 November	Munich	Germany	Olympiahalle	—	—
27 November	Nuremberg	Germany	Arena Nürnberger Versicherung	—	—
29 November	Vienna	Austria	Wiener Stadthalle	—	—
1 December	Kraków	Poland	Tauron Arena	—	—
2 December	Budapest	Hungary	MVM Dome	—	—
4 December	Bucharest	Romania	Romexpo	—	—
6 December	Istanbul	Turkey	Ülker Sports and Event Hall	—	—
8 December	Sofia	Bulgaria	Arena 8888	—	—
10 December	Zagreb	Croatia	Arena Zagreb	—	—
12 December	Milan	Italy	Alcatraz	—	—
14 December	Zürich	Switzerland	Hallenstadion	—	—
16 December	Stuttgart	Germany	Hanns-Martin-Schleyer-Halle	—	—
18 December	Prague	Czech Republic	O2 Arena	—	—
29 December	Singapore		Singapore Expo	—	—
31 December	Phuket	Thailand	Lotus Arena	—	—

List of 2026 shows
Date (2026)	City	Country	Venue	Attendance	Revenue
3 January	Bangkok	Thailand	UOB Live	—	—
4 January	Dubai	United Arab Emirates	Coca-Cola Arena	—	—
6 January	Almaty	Kazakhstan	Almaty Arena	—	—
7 January	Almaty	Kazakhstan	Almaty Arena	—	—
9 January	Tashkent	Uzbekistan	Axelon Karting Centre	—	—
11 January	Tbilisi	Georgia	Sports Palace	—	—
15 January	Brisbane	Australia	Fortitude Music Hall	—	—
17 January	Sydney	Australia	Hordern Pavillon	—	—
18 January	Melbourne	Australia	Pica	—	—
20 January	Adelaide	Australia	AEC Theatre	—	—
22 January	Perth	Australia	Metro City	—	—
3 July (Note: The 3 and 4 July, concerts are set to be a part of Tillfest.)	Leipzig	Germany	Völkerschlachtdenkmal	—N/a	—N/a
4 July	Leipzig	Germany	Völkerschlachtdenkmal	—N/a	—N/a
Total				—	—
