= F & M (album) =

Studio album by Lindemann
- Released: 22 November 2019
- Studio: The Abyss (Pärlby, Sweden)
- Genre: Neue Deutsche Härte; industrial metal
- Length: 43:05
- Label: Universal
- Producer: Peter Tägtgren

Lindemann chronology
Skills in Pills (2015)	F & M (2019)

Singles from F & M
- 1. "Steh auf" Released: 13 September 2019; 2. "Ich weiß es nicht" Released: 18 October 2019; 3. "Knebel" Released: 1 November 2019; 4. "Frau & Mann" Released: 23 November 2019; 5. "Platz eins" Released: 4 February 2020

F & M (an abbreviation of Frau und Mann; German for "Woman and Man") is the second and final studio album by German-Swedish super-duo Lindemann. It was released on 22 November 2019 through Universal Music and Vertigo Berlin. The album was preceded by three singles; "Steh auf", "Ich weiß es nicht" and "Knebel", with "Steh auf" peaking at No. 8 in Germany. This album features songs with entirely German lyrics, in contrast to the duo's debut album, Skills in Pills, which was entirely in English. It was also the last album to feature Hypocrisy/Pain Multi-instrumentalist Peter Tägtgren as a duo with Till Lindemann before he left in 2020.

== Promotion and release ==
Professional ratings
Review scores
Source	Rating
metal.de	8/10
Stereoboard	3.5/5 stars

In 2018, the duo made music for an adaptation of the play "Hänsel und Gretel" with Till Lindemann also appearing in the play. Most songs performed from the play are confirmed to be on the album, with the exception of "Sauber". It is currently unclear whether it will appear as a B-side in the future. "Ich liebe das Leben" is included on the album under the new title of "Wer weiß das schon".

Prior to the announcement of the album, Lindemann released the song "Mathematik", featuring German rapper Haftbefehl, on 18 December 2018, with an accompanying music video. The album was announced on 13 September 2019 alongside the release of the song "Steh auf". A music video for the song, starring the band alongside Swedish actor Peter Stormare, was released on the same day. On 13 October, the band shared a 40-second snippet of the song "Blut" on their YouTube channel. On 18 October, the band shared a third song, "Ich weiß es nicht", along with a remix of the song by American industrial metal band Ministry. On 21 October, they shared a music video for "Ich weiß es nicht", featuring black-and-white computer-generated imagery crafted by artificial intelligence. On 29 October, the band shared a 40-second snippet of the song "Allesfresser" on their YouTube channel. On 1 November, the song "Knebel" was released, along with an accompanying, uncensored music video on www.knebel-video.com.

F & M was released through Universal Music and Vertigo Berlin on 22 November 2019 as a download, 12-inch vinyl, and CD, the latter in standard and deluxe editions. The vinyl release features a different cover art from the other editions of the album. The deluxe CD release is designed as a 42-page hardcover book. The vinyl, deluxe CD, and deluxe digital versions of the album all feature two bonus tracks; the original version of "Mathematik" and a Pain version of "Ach so gern".

Music videos for "Steh auf" and "Frau & Mann" were released, featuring Peter Stormare. Alec Chillingworth from Stereoboard compared three first tracks to Basshunter music sponsored by Classic FM.

== Track listing ==
All lyrics are written by Till Lindemann; all music is composed by Peter Tägtgren, except "Ach so gern" by Jonas Kjellgren, "Wer weiß das schon" by Clemens Wijers, "Mathematik" by Sebastian Tägtgren, "Knebel" by Till Lindemann and Peter Tägtgren.

F & M
No.	Title	Length
1.	"Steh auf" ("Stand Up")	3:04
2.	"Ich weiß es nicht" ("I Don't Know")	4:49
3.	"Allesfresser" ("Omnivore")	3:29
4.	"Blut" ("Blood")	4:02
5.	"Knebel" ("Gag")	3:50
6.	"Frau & Mann" ("Woman & Man")	3:33
7.	"Ach so gern" ("Oh So Glad")	3:22
8.	"Schlaf ein" ("Go to Sleep")	5:09
9.	"Gummi" ("Rubber")	3:56
10.	"Platz eins" ("First Place")	3:55
11.	"Wer weiß das schon" ("Who Knows")	3:49
Total length:		43:05

Special digibook and Japanese special edition bonus tracks
No.	Title	Length
12.	"Mathematik" ("Mathematics"; original version)	3:34
13.	"Ach so gern" (Pain version)	3:49
Total length:		50:28

Jewel case bonus tracks
No.	Title	Length
12.	"Mathematik" ("Mathematics"; original version)	3:34
13.	"Ach so gern" (Pain version)	3:49
14.	"Steh auf" (Trivium remix)	3:08
15.	"Ich weiß es nicht" (Ministry remix)	5:49
Total length:		59:35

Deluxe edition jewel case bonus tracks
No.	Title	Length
12.	"Mathematik" ("Mathematics"; original version)	3:34
13.	"Ach so gern" (Pain version)	3:49
14.	"Mathematik" (A19 mix)	3:36
15.	"Mathematik" (remix A4)	3:36
16.	"Mathematik" (Benson remix)	3:36
17.	"Steh auf" (Trivium remix)	3:08
18.	"Ich weiß es nicht" (Ministry remix)	5:49
Total length:		70:23

== Personnel ==
- Till Lindemann – vocals, arrangements
- Peter Tägtgren – all instruments (except tracks 7, 13 and drums), arrangements, producing, engineering, recording, mixing

=== Additional personnel ===
- Jonas Kjellgren – all instruments (tracks 7, 13), drums
- Matt Heafy – acoustic guitar and production on "Steh auf (Trivium remix)"
- Clemens Wijers – orchestra additional arrangements
- Svante Forsbäck – mastering
- Rocket & Wink – artwork
- Heilemania – photography
- Jens Koch – photography
- Matthias Matthies – photography
- Boris Schade – legal consultant
- Lichte Rechtsanwälte – legal consultant
- Birgit Fordyce – management
- Stefan Mehnert – management

== Charts ==
=== Weekly charts ===
Chart (2019)	Peak position
Australian Digital Albums (ARIA)	25
Austrian Albums (Ö3 Austria)	3
Belgian Albums (Ultratop Flanders)	9
Belgian Albums (Ultratop Wallonia)	25
Canadian Albums (Billboard)	92
Czech Albums (ČNS IFPI)	8
Dutch Albums (Album Top 100)	18
Finnish Albums (Suomen virallinen lista)	5
French Albums (SNEP)	38
German Albums (Offizielle Top 100)	1
Hungarian Albums (MAHASZ)	11
Italian Albums (FIMI)	70
Lithuanian Albums (AGATA)	98
Norwegian Albums (VG-lista)	20
Polish Albums (ZPAV)	20
Scottish Albums (OCC)	47
Spanish Albums (PROMUSICAE)	22
Swedish Albums (Sverigetopplistan)	23
Swiss Albums (Schweizer Hitparade)	3
UK Albums (OCC)	85

=== Year-end charts ===
Chart (2019)	Position
Swiss Albums (Schweizer Hitparade)	91

== Certifications ==
Region	Certification	Certified units/sales
Germany (BVMI)	Gold	100,000^{‡}
^{‡} Sales+streaming figures based on certification alone.

== Release history ==
Region	Date	Format	Label	Ref.
Various	22 November 2019	Download; streaming	Universal; Vertigo Berlin	
Various	22 November 2019	12-inch vinyl	Universal	
Various	22 November 2019	CD (standard edition)	Universal	
Various	22 November 2019	CD (deluxe edition)	Universal	
