= World Tour 2027 (Till Lindemann) =

2027 concert tour by Till Lindemann

- Tour by Till Lindemann
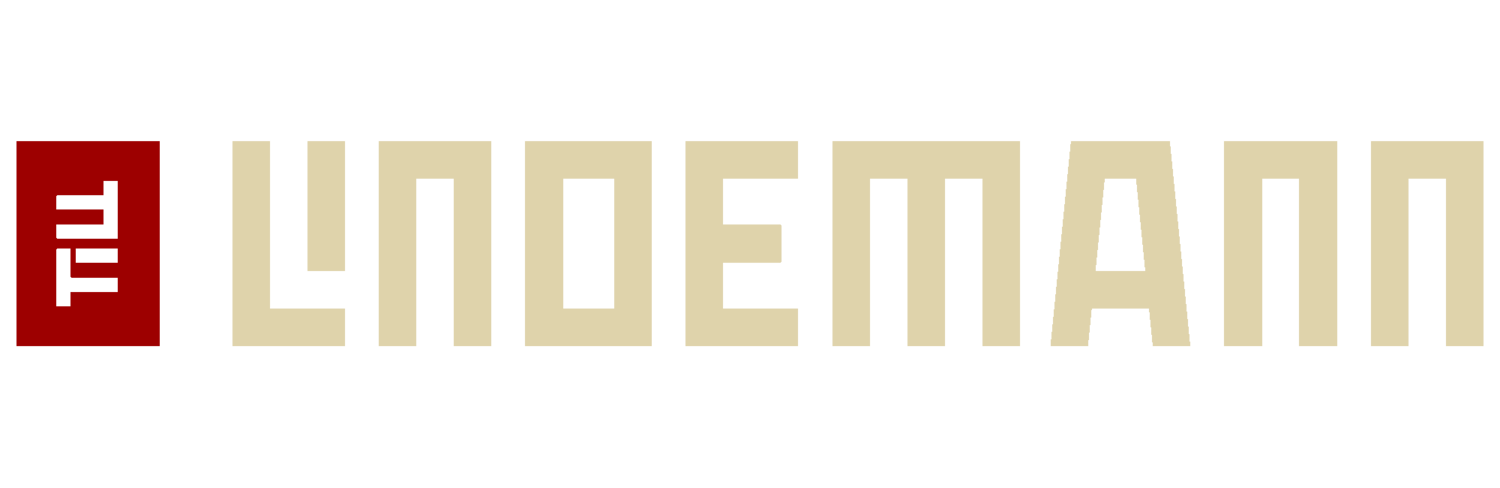
- Location: Europe; North America; South America
- Start date: 16 April 2027
- End date: 12 December 2027
- Legs: 2
- No. of shows: 50

Till Lindemann concert chronology
- Meine Welt Tour (2025–2026); World Tour 2027

The World Tour 2027 is an upcoming concert tour by German singer Till Lindemann. Announced in October 2026, the tour is currently scheduled to comprise more than 50 performances worldwide, including 33 concerts across 22 European countries. It is set to begin in 16 April 2027 in North America and South America, followed by a second leg in Europe in the fall.

== Background ==
The World Tour 2027 follows Lindemann's Meine Welt solo tour, which took place in 2025 and the Till Fest in 2026. According to the tour's promoter, the earlier tour sold more than 200,000 tickets across Europe. The European Tour Dates were announced on the 26th October, the same day, on which the death of Till Lindemann's mother, Gitta Lindemann was announced. On 11 November 2026, shows for North America and South America were announced.

The 2027 tour continues Lindemann's activities as a solo performer, separate from his work with Rammstein.

== Reception ==
The announcement prompted discussion among Rammstein fans about the band's future touring plans. Some fans expressed concern that Lindemann's extensive solo touring schedule could make a Rammstein tour in 2027 less likely. Even the Rammstein Keyboarder Christian „Flake“ Lorenz stated, that 2027 would be too early for a new Rammstein Tour, following their Stadium Tour from 2019 to 2024.

== Tour Overview ==
The European leg comprises 34 concerts in 22 countries, with Germany accounting for ten performances. Other countries included in the announced itinerary include Latvia, Finland, Norway, Denmark, the Netherlands, the United Kingdom, France, Italy, Spain, Portugal, Switzerland, Austria, Hungary, Serbia, Turkey and Moldova. The European leg is scheduled to begin in Riga, Latvia, in October 2027 and conclude in Prague, Czech Republic, in December 2027.

== Tour dates ==
List of 2027 concerts
Date (2027)	City	Country	Venue	Attendance	Revenue
16 April	São Paulo	Brazil	Tokio Marine Hall	—	—
18 April	Buenos Aires	Argentina	Estadio Obras Sanitarias	—	—
20 April	Santiago de Chile	Chile	Teatro Caupolicán	—	—
23 April	Quito	Ecuador	Arena Bicentenario	—	—
25 April	Bogotá	Columbia	El Corazón de Bogotá	—	—
28 April	Heredia	Costa Rica	Palacio de los Deportes	—	—
30 April	Mexico City	Mexico	Pepsi Center	—	—
06 May	Miami Beach	United States	The Fillmore	—	—
08 May	Daytona Beach	United States	Welcome to Rockville	—	—
10 May	Brooklyn	United States	Brooklyn Paramount	—	—
12 May	Montreal	Canada	MTELUS	—	—
13 May	Montreal	Canada	MTELUS	—	—
15 May	Columbus	United States	Sonic Temple	—	—
17 May	Denver	United States	Fillmore Auditorium	—	—
19 May	San Francisco	United States	The Regency Ballroom	—	—
21 May	Los Angeles	United States	The Wiltern	—	—
2 October	Riga	Latvia	Xiaomi Arena	—	—
4 October	Helsinki	Finland	Helsinki Ice Hall	—	—
6 October	Oslo	Norway	Oslo Spektrum	—	—
8 October	Gothenburg	Sweden	Partille Arena	—	—
10 October	Copenhagen	Denmark	K.B. Hallen	—	—
12 October	Rostock	Germany	Stadthalle	—	—
13 October	Rostock	Germany	Stadthalle	—	—
15 October	Münster	Germany	MCC Halle Münsterland	—	—
17 October	Amsterdam	Netherlands	AFAS Live	—	—
19 October	Manchester	England	O2 Apollo	—	—
21 October	London	England	Hammersmith Apollo	—	—
23 October	Antwerp	Belgium	Lotto Arena	—	—
26 October	Mannheim	Germany	SAP Arena	—	—
28 October	Oberhausen	Germany	Rudolf Weber-Arena	—	—
30 October	Kassel	Germany	Probonio Arena	—	—
1 November	Zurich	Switzerland	Hallenstadion	—	—
2 November	Milan	Italy	Alcatraz	—	—
5 November	Madrid	Spain	La Riviera	—	—
7 November	Lisbon	Portugal	Sagres Campo Pequeno	—	—
9 November	Barcelona	Spain	Razzmatazz	—	—
11 November	Paris	France	Zénith	—	—
13 November	Nuremberg	Germany	PSD Bank Nürnberg Arena	—	—
15 November	Munich	Germany	Olympiahalle	—	—
17 November	Vienna	Austria	Wiener Stadthalle	—	—
19 November	Belgrade	Serbia	Belgrade Arena	—	—
23 November	Istanbul	Turkey	Ülker Sports and Event Hall	—	—
28 November	Cluj-Napoca	Romania	BTarena	—	—
30 November	Chișinău	Moldova	Chișinău Arena	—	—
2 December	Budapest	Hungary	MVM Dome	—	—
4 December	Dresden	Germany	MESSE	—	—
6 December	Hamburg	Germany	Barclays Arena	—	—
7 December	Magdeburg	Germany	GETEC Arena	—	—
9 December	Kraków	Poland	Tauron Arena Kraków	—	—
12 December	Prague	Czech Republic	O2 Arena	—	—
