= Grün & Blau =

Compilation album by Feeling B
- Released: 2007
- Recorded: 1989, 1991, 1993, 2007
- Genre: Punk rock
- Length: 48:27

Feeling B chronology
Die Maske des Roten Todes (1993)	Grün & Blau (2007)

Grün & Blau (Green and Blue) is a compilation album by Feeling B. It contains re-recorded and remixed Feeling B songs that were uncovered by Christian Lorenz. It was released in 2007.

== Track listing ==
1. Graf Zahl (Count von Count)
2. Langeweile (Boredom)
3. Dufte (Awesome)
4. Frosch im Brunnen (Frog In The Well)
5. Herzschrittmacher (Pacemaker)
6. Keine Zeit (No Time)
7. Häßlich (Ugly)
8. Gipfel (Summit)
9. Schlendrian (Spend)
10. Wieder keine Zeit (No Time Again)
11. Space Race
12. Veris Dulcis
13. Grün & Blau (Green & Blue)
