= Christian Lorenz =

German keyboardist (born 1966)

Christian "Flake" Lorenz
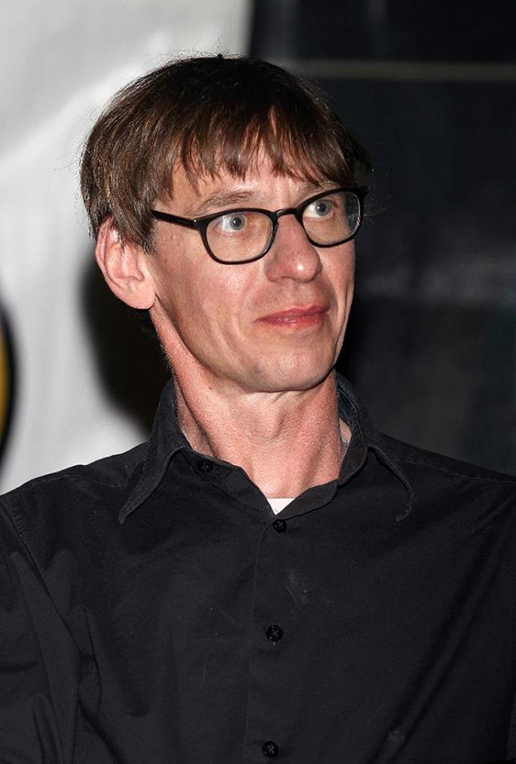
- Lorenz in 2013

Background information
- Also known as: Doktor Lorenz, Flake
- Born: Christian Lorenz; 16 November 1966 (age 59); East Berlin, East Germany
- Genres: Neue Deutsche Härte, industrial metal, punk rock (early)
- Occupation: Musician
- Instrument: Keyboards
- Years active: 1983–present
- Member of: Rammstein
- Formerly of: Feeling B Die Magdalene Keibel Kombo
- Partner: Jenny Rosemeyer (married)

Christian "Flake" Lorenz (German: [ˈkʁɪsti̯a(ː)n ˈflaːkə ˈloːʁɛnts]; born 16 November 1966) is a German musician. He is best known as the keyboardist in Neue Deutsche Härte band Rammstein, as well as the main composer of the band's songs along with guitarist Richard Kruspe. He was also a member of the East German punk band Feeling B.

Lorenz has released a solo album named Flake feiert Weihnachten ("Flake celebrates Christmas"), which consists of covers of popular Christmas songs.

== Career ==
=== Feeling B ===
In 1983, at age 16, Lorenz began to play in the band Feeling B with Paul Landers and Aljoscha Rompe, a Swiss singer living in East Berlin. He stayed with the band for about ten years. Feeling B started out firmly grounded in the underground punk scene.

Lorenz lived in an apartment with Landers during their early years. When they were not playing gigs, they would sell jackets made from cut-up bed sheets and dusters on the black market. Two jackets a month meant as much money as an average salaried worker. "It was quite easy to make a living; not to work and stay out of trouble," said Landers, "You only got problems if you were caught."

The group disbanded in the mid-1990s. On special occasions, the band members would get together for concerts at punk festivals, until Rompe died in November 2000 of an asthma attack.

=== Rammstein ===
In 1994, Till Lindemann, Richard Kruspe, Oliver Riedel and Christoph Schneider entered and won the Berlin Senate Metro beat contest that allowed them to professionally record a four track demo. Paul Landers formally joined the band, followed by Lorenz. He was initially reluctant to join his five bandmates and had to be pestered into becoming a member of Rammstein, as he thought they would be too boring. Eventually, he agreed to join, and the group began work on their first album, Herzeleid (Heartache).

In early live performances of the song "Bück dich" ("Bend down" or "Bend over"), Lorenz and vocalist Till Lindemann engaged in simulated sodomy with a liquor-squirting dildo. On 23 September 1998, in Worcester, Massachusetts (USA) Lindemann and Lorenz were arrested and charged with lewd and lascivious behavior. A statement from Sergeant Thomas Radula of the Worcester Police Department stated that Lindemann was simulating sex with Lorenz onstage "using a phallic object that shot water over the crowd". They were held and released the following day on US$25 bail. After months of legal debate, they were fined US$100.

Until 2002, Lorenz would "surf" the audience in an inflatable rubber dinghy during the performance of "Seemann" ("Seaman"). Riedel took his place in 2002. According to Lorenz, the change occurred because he was injured too often. During a 2001 concert in St. Petersburg, Lorenz was tipped out of the boat by the crowd and almost completely undressed. Despite this, Lorenz returned to riding the dinghy for Rammstein's 2009 tour during the performance of "Haifisch" ("Shark").

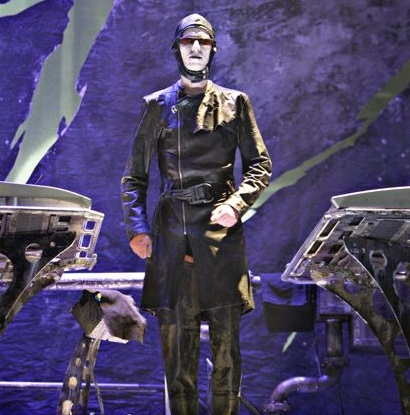
Lorenz in his band costume (2009)

During a concert in Gothenburg, Sweden on 30 July 2005, Till Lindemann suffered a knee injury when Lorenz accidentally ran into him with the Segway he rides during the performance of "Amerika" ("America"). This caused concerts scheduled in Asia to be cancelled.

In 2005, Lorenz suffered from mumps, causing concerts in South America to be cancelled.

In January 2012, Lorenz, along with Lindemann, was interviewed by heavy metal anthropologist Sam Dunn for the VH1 Classic series Metal Evolution, on the topic of shock rock.

== Personal life ==
Lorenz has been divorced once and has five children. On 12 September 2008, Lorenz married artist Jenny Rosemeyer, who provided the whistling for Rammstein's song "Roter Sand". He has a brother who is four years older. Lorenz is an amateur painter and likes classic cars. He has a Mercedes and is involved in the vintage car hire business. In November 2011 Lorenz's house was set on fire. The police managed to identify and capture the arsonist, a 28-year-old male with a criminal record who crashed his car nearby while fleeing from the scene.

=== Nicknames ===
Lorenz commonly goes by the nicknames "Flake" (pronounced as "Flak-eh" in German, derived from the Viking village in which the Vicke Viking series of children's books take place) and "Doktor". "Doktor" came about because at one point he wanted to be a surgeon, but he was unable to study to become one because of his refusal to join the East German military. In a 16 December 2000 interview, he stated that "Flake" is his proper name.

=== Religion and politics ===
Lorenz has stated "I disapprove of religions which are made into rigid institutions. I also think that religious fanaticism and missionary work are dangerous."

Lorenz has criticized the United States which, in a 2001 interview, he called a "sick and decadent country with no culture". However, in the same interview, he stated: "I prefer playing in the USA [over Germany] because the attitude to music is more relaxed [in America]," and also opined that he favored the American city of Seattle when touring.

On 5 October 2005, Lorenz appeared briefly on Deutsche Welle. When asked how he felt about the reunification of Germany, he said he misses the way things were then. "Even if the GDR survived, I still would've stayed a musician. The increased size of the world also brought the danger of being compared to all of the international acts. The bands which were in the east were the only ones there, and if you were successful there, you were successful. I miss the simplicity. You went into a bar, ordered a beer, and you got a beer!... They didn't ask if you wanted... with a head or without a head, foam top or bottom... It really gets on my nerves having all of these choices I really don't want". In 2014, in an essay titled "I'm missing the GDR" Flake Lorenz stated "I miss the GDR even today. More so than the bands from that time."

In a 2014 interview with Rolling Stone, Lindemann stated that "Flake is still a citizen of the GDR, and he will die a citizen of the GDR". In a 2019 interview with Metal Hammer, he recalled life in East Germany as "free of trouble and pressure, we all had enough money to live".

== Discography ==
=== With Rammstein ===
See Rammstein discography

=== With Feeling B ===
- Hea Hoa Hoa Hea Hea Hoa (1989)
- Wir kriegen Euch alle (1991)
- Die Maske des Roten Todes (1993)
- Grün & Blau (2007)

=== Solo ===
==== Studio albums ====
- Flake feiert Weihnachten (2024)
- Flake feiert wieder Weihnachten (2025)

==== Singles ====
- Happy Xmas (War is over) (2024)
- Weisser Winterwald (2024)
- Leise rieselt der Schnee (2025)

== Bibliography ==
- Der Tastenficker: An was ich mich so erinnern kann (Autobiography, 2015)
- Heute hat die Welt Geburtstag (Novel, 2017)
