= Skills in Pills =

- Standard edition cover

Studio album by Lindemann
- Released: 23 June 2015
- Studio: The Abyss (Pärlby, Sweden)
- Genre: Industrial metal
- Length: 40:26
- Label: Warner Central Europe
- Producer: Peter Tägtgren

Lindemann chronology
Skills in Pills (2015)	F & M (2019)

Singles from Skills in Pills
- 1. "Praise Abort" Released: 28 May 2015; 2. "Fish On" Released: 9 October 2015

Skills in Pills is the debut studio album by the European supergroup Lindemann, featuring Rammstein frontman Till Lindemann and Peter Tägtgren, founder of Hypocrisy and Pain. It was released on 23 June 2015 through Warner Central Europe. It was preceded by the lead single "Praise Abort", released on 28 May 2015, with "Fish On" receiving a single release later on 9 October. The album reached number one in Finland and Germany, also peaking within the top 10 in Austria, Croatia, Czechia, Denmark, Hungary, Norway, and Switzerland. This was the only Lindemann album to have been recorded completely in English, as Till reverted to his usual native of German on the group's second studio album F & M.

== Composition ==
When commenting on the way the album was prepared, Tägtgren said:

We went over everything on telephone and emails for how we wanted to construct the song itself. When we finally got into the studio, after half a year of emailing and things like that, he came in and nailed four songs in 12 hours or something like that.

He defined it as a "party album [...] I see it as a 2015 Billy Idol kinda thing, except the lyrics are more ironic and funny. It's good music to pre-party to before you go out to the bar". Unlike in Rammstein, Lindemann sings all the songs in English instead of his native German. About this, Tägtgren said:

I don't miss the German, let's put it that way. [laughs] His voice is so strong, I just think it's genius. I know the hardcore Rammstein fans might not be happy but when he sings in English you don't miss the German language. [...] He came from East Germany, where it was very difficult, because of Communism, to learn English. So, for him, it's still very new. [...] when Rammstein went out of Germany, he learned a lot of English. For him, it's like a new beginning.

Lindemann himself said: "It's very different and very difficult too. I had to kinda crawl into it and Peter encouraged me to do it. To be honest, I wasn't sure about it. My self-confidence was really low, but it became better and better. I researched a lot with the lyrics and even my experience in writing e-mails in English was like zero, so I had to learn a lot and work with dictionaries and shit like that".

Tägtgren defined the lyrics as "spooky" and said: "Read between the lines and find the irony. Don't think it's all so serious. For us, it's not to provoke. Yes, we want to shock people but, like I said, it's a party album". Lindemann also commented on this matter: "We didn't want to be really nasty or provocative or insulting. [This is] the first time English speakers can understand the lyrics, which is usually impossible in Rammstein. It's very sexual, but that's what I've done in Rammstein for twenty years, it's just that nobody's understood it!"

"Ladyboy" was the first song written by the duo. "Golden Shower" and "Skills in Pills" are songs based on Lindemann's personal experiences. Referring to the latter, he commented: "I grew up in the eastern part of Germany and we had booze of course, but sometimes we had these 'pills parties', where we put shit together. We collected stuff, because it was hard to get medication, and then we had like medication orgies which was really strange".

"Praise Abort" was composed around something Lindemann sang to his smartphone and sent to Tägtgren. The song received a promotional video, released on 28 May, which Tägtgren defined as "grotesque" and "very sick".

"Cowboy" was a critique of American masculinity, showing the cowboys as the ones that would come over and beat up the Indians, contradicting Hollywood's propaganda.

== Release ==
Professional ratings
Review scores
Source	Rating
AllMusic	3.5/5 stars
Consequence of Sound	F
Metal Hammer	7/10
Sputnikmusic	4.5/5

On 22 and 23 April, respectively, the band revealed the track listing and the cover for the album at their Facebook page. On 2 May, the band released audio snippets of the title track. On 11 June, snippets for the remaining songs were released.

The album was released on 22 June 2015 via Warner Central Europe.

In October 2015, the band streamed a B-side of their second single "Fish On", titled "G-Spot Michael".

== Packaging ==
The album is available in several different editions, including a standard edition, digital, special, super deluxe, and vinyl. The latter three include a bonus track, while the super deluxe edition also comes with an 80-page hardcover book and different cover art.

== Track listing ==
All lyrics are written by Lindemann; all music is composed by Tägtgren.

No.	Title	Length
1.	"Skills in Pills"	4:13
2.	"Ladyboy"	3:20
3.	"Fat"	4:12
4.	"Fish On"	4:12
5.	"Children of the Sun"	3:40
6.	"Home Sweet Home"	3:45
7.	"Cowboy"	3:11
8.	"Golden Shower"	4:24
9.	"Yukon"	4:45
10.	"Praise Abort"	4:44
Total length:		40:26

Special edition bonus track
No.	Title	Music	Length
11.	"That's My Heart"	Tägtgren, Lindemann, Wijers	4:35
Total length:			45:01

== Personnel ==
Writing, performance and production credits are adapted from the album liner notes.

Lindemann

- Till Lindemann – vocals
- Peter Tägtgren – all instruments, orchestra arrangement

Additional musicians

- Clemens Wijers (Carach Angren) – orchestra treatment; vocals on "That's My Heart"
- Jonas Kjellgren – banjo on "Cowboy"
- Pärlby Choir – children's choir

Production

- Peter Tägtgren – production, engineering; mixing (only "Fish On", "Golden Shower", "That's My Heart")
- Jonas Kjellgren – recording (drums only)
- Stefan Glaumann – mixing (except "Fish On", "Golden Shower", "That's My Heart")
- Svante Forsbäck – mastering
- Jacob Hellner – post-production
- Tom van Heesch – post-production editing

Artwork and design

- Rocket & Wink – artwork
- Heilemania – photography

Studios

- Abyss Studio, Pärlby – recording, mixing
- Studio Drispeth Nr. 1 – pre-production (vocals only)
- Hometown Studios, Stockholm – mixing
- Chartmakers Audio Mastering, Helsinki – mastering
- Big Island Sound, Stockholm – post-production

== Charts ==
=== Weekly charts ===
Chart (2015)	Peak position
Australian Albums (ARIA)	17
Austrian Albums (Ö3 Austria)	3
Belgian Albums (Ultratop Flanders)	17
Belgian Albums (Ultratop Wallonia)	19
Canadian Albums (Billboard)	15
Croatian International Albums (HDU)	3
Czech Albums (ČNS IFPI)	4
Dutch Albums (Album Top 100)	6
Finnish Albums (Suomen virallinen lista)	1
French Albums (SNEP)	16
German Albums (Offizielle Top 100)	1
Hungarian Albums (MAHASZ)	2
Italian Albums (FIMI)	33
South Korean International Albums (Circle)	33
New Zealand Albums (RMNZ)	23
Norwegian Albums (VG-lista)	9
Polish Albums (ZPAV)	31
Portuguese Albums (AFP)	18
Scottish Albums (OCC)	28
Spanish Albums (PROMUSICAE)	28
Swedish Albums (Sverigetopplistan)	27
Swiss Albums (Schweizer Hitparade)	2
UK Albums (OCC)	35
UK Album Downloads (OCC)	71
UK Rock & Metal Albums (OCC)	2
US Billboard 200	144
US Top Rock Albums (Billboard)	18

=== Year-end charts ===
Chart (2015)	Position
Belgian Albums (Ultratop Flanders)	188
German Albums (Offizielle Top 100)	47

== Certifications ==
Region	Certification	Certified units/sales
Germany (BVMI)	Gold	100,000^{‡}
^{‡} Sales+streaming figures based on certification alone.
