= Dekadance (band) =

Bandmembers
Lead Vocals	Bert Stephan
Trombone	Black Buster
Sax	White Buster
Electric violin	Hansi Noack
Guitar	Feuer Buster
Bass Guitar	Tom Götze
Drums	Gabi Schubert

Dekadance is a rock band from Dresden, Germany, founded in the early 1980s. Their music is influenced by many genres, for instance folk, jazz, rock and experimental - being described as is quite Zappaesque. They were seen as an alternative music band that shared more or less open criticism of the East German political system. The band is known for its surreal and bizarre form of humour that tends to underpin its live performance.

The band members are also involved in various independent projects, such as The New Fantastic Art Orchestra Of North, Aufruhr in der Savanne (a.i.d.s.), the Rockys, Potentia Animi, and Olaf Schubert.

== Discography ==
- Happy Birthday (1989)
- Dem Deutschen Volke (1991)
- Peace Light (1992)
- Unfugged (1994)
- The Lappen (1997)
- Die Fette kommt (1999)
- Live in London (2002)
