= Till Lindemann =

German singer (born 1963)

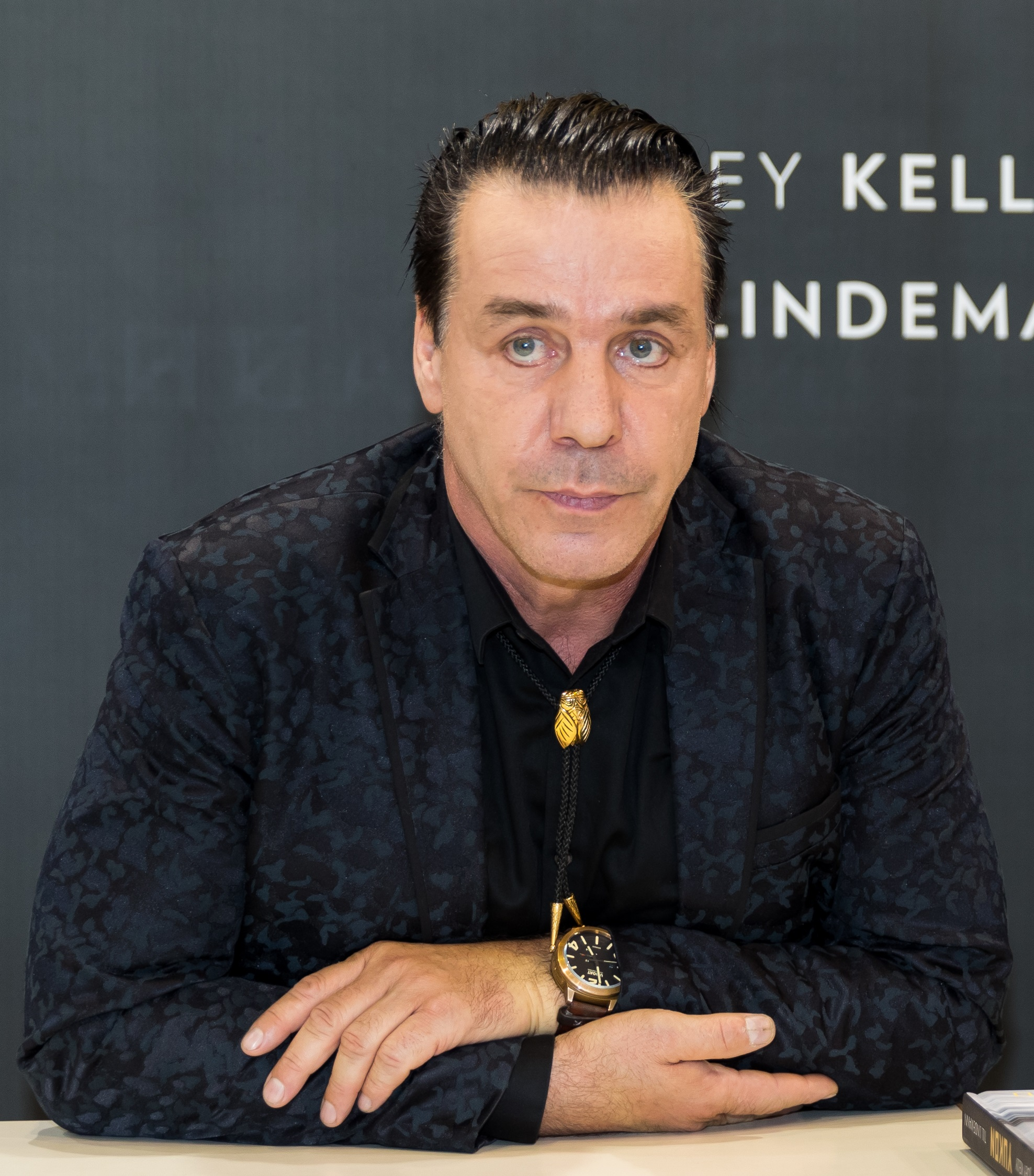
- Lindemann in 2017
- Born: 4 January 1963 (age 63); Leipzig, East Germany
- Occupations: Singer; songwriter; poet; actor
- Years active: 1986–present
- Parents: Werner Lindemann; Brigitte Lindemann
- Musical career
- Genres: Neue Deutsche Härte; industrial metal
- Instruments: Vocals; drums
- Member of: Rammstein
- Formerly of: First Arsch; Lindemann
- Website: till-lindemann.com

Till Lindemann (German pronunciation: [tɪl ˈlɪndəman]; born 4 January 1963) is a German singer-songwriter and poet, best known as the lead vocalist and lyricist of the Neue Deutsche Härte band Rammstein. Renowned for his theatrical stage performances, poetic lyrics, and distinctive bass-baritone voice, he is a central figure in the band’s international success. He was also part of the musical project Lindemann before beginning to release music under his own name. He has appeared in several films in minor roles and has published three books of poetry.

Rammstein has sold over 25 million records worldwide, with five of their albums receiving platinum status, and Lindemann has been listed among the "50 Greatest Metal Frontmen of All Time" by Roadrunner Records.

== Early life ==
Lindemann was born on 4 January 1963 in Leipzig (then in East Germany), the son of Norddeutscher Rundfunk (NDR) journalist Brigitte Hildegard "Gitta" Lindemann and poet Werner Lindemann. His parents first met at a conference in Bitterfeld in 1959. He grew up in Wendisch-Rambow alongside his younger sister, Saskia. At age 11, Lindemann went to a sports school at the sports club SC Empor Rostock, and attended a boarding school from 1977 to 1980. His parents lived separately for career reasons after 1975, and divorced when Lindemann was still young. He lived with his father for a short time, but the relationship was unhealthy; in the book Mike Oldfield im Schaukelstuhl, his father wrote about his own problems with alcoholism and the difficulties of being a father to a teenage Lindemann.

In 1978, Lindemann participated in the European Junior Swimming Championships in Florence, finishing 11th in the 1500 m freestyle and 7th in the 400 m freestyle, swimming a time of 4'17"58; he was shortlisted to go to the 1980 Olympics in Moscow, but left the sport due to an injury. According to Lindemann, "I never liked the sport school actually, it was very intense. But as a child you don't object." He later worked as an apprentice carpenter, a gallery technician, a peat cutter, and a basket weaver. His mother dedicated a letter titled Mein Sohn, der Frontmann von Rammstein ("My son, the frontman of Rammstein") to Lindemann in 2009. The first album he owned was Deep Purple's Stormbringer.

== Career ==
=== Music ===
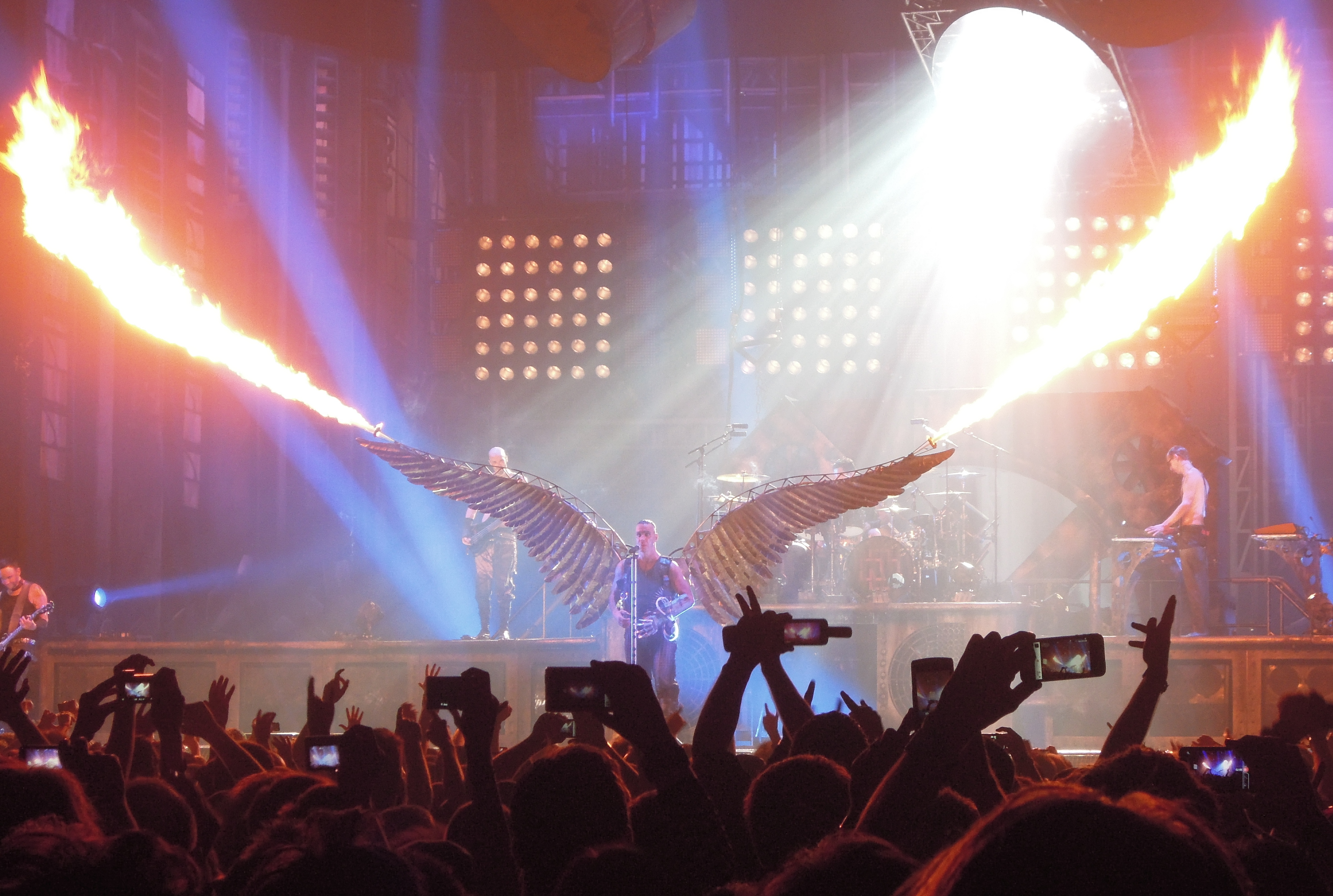
Lindemann at a Rammstein concert during a performance of "Engel", wearing angel wings fitted with flamethrowers in 2012

Lindemann started to play drums for Schwerin-based experimental rock band First Arsch in 1986, who released an album titled Saddle Up in 1992, and played one song ("Lied von der unruhevollen Jugend") with a punk band called Feeling B, which was the future band of Rammstein members Paul Landers, Christoph Schneider and Christian "Flake" Lorenz in 1989. During his time in Feeling B, he played the drums in the band. In the 1990s, Lindemann began to write lyrics. In 1994, the band entered and won a contest in Berlin that allowed them to record a four track demo professionally. When questioned as to why Rammstein was named after the Ramstein air show disaster, he said he viewed images of the incident on television, and that he and the bandmates wanted to make a musical memorial.

Lindemann then moved to Berlin. During Rammstein's early years, because of his use of over-the-top pyrotechnics, Lindemann burned his ears, hair and arms. Bandmate Christoph Schneider commented, "Till gets burned all the time, but he likes the pain." An incident in September 1996 caused a section of the band's set to burn, and as a result, Lindemann got his certification in pyrotechnics so the band could perform with pyrotechnics more safely than it had previously.

During Rammstein's US tour in June 1999, Lindemann and his bandmate Christian "Flake" Lorenz were arrested in Worcester, Massachusetts, for lewd conduct performed during their song "Bück dich" ("bend over"), which consisted of Lindemann using a liquid squirting dildo and simulating anal sex on Lorenz. Both Lindemann and Lorenz were released the following day after bail was met. This incident did not stop Lindemann from performing in the same manner for future shows outside the United States, particularly in Australia when they performed at the 2011 Big Day Out, but the United States performances of this song were changed into a sadomasochistic theme that did not feature dildos, although this was not the case for all remaining US shows on the tour. For example, on 18 June 1999, "Bück dich" was performed in the same manner at the Roseland Theater in Portland, Oregon. In 1999, the band was blamed for the 1999 Columbine massacre, but they denied their music was a factor.

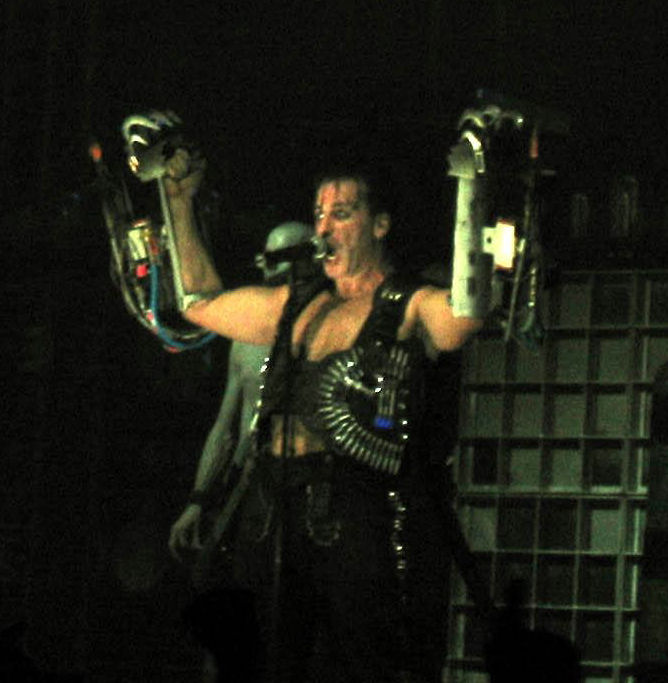
Lindemann during a performance of the song "Rammstein", wearing dual arm-mounted flamethrowers in 2005

Lindemann is not a stranger to injury, as he mentioned in Rammstein's early career that he'd gotten burned several times with unprofessionally rigged pyrotechnics. At a performance in Sweden in 2005, he received a knee injury on stage when keyboardist Flake accidentally ran into him while riding a Segway PT. This injury caused several tour dates in Asia to be cancelled.

In 2005, five Rammstein albums received platinum awards and the band also received the "World Sales Awards" for over 10 million sold copies worldwide.

During the filming of the band's music video for "Ich tu dir weh", Lindemann wanted a light put in his mouth to create a visually stunning effect. Bandmate Paul Landers suggested that he use a flesh colored wire and run it along his cheek to shine a light into his mouth from the outside. Lindemann refused, and instead opted to have a surgical incision in his left cheek, so that a light could be fed into his mouth directly, and largely out of sight.

There is a specific performance move of Lindemann's, dubbed "The Till Hammer". This move is where he bends his knees, beats his thigh with a fist in a hammering motion while turning his head from side to side. On occasion, Flake has been seen to parody the move onstage.

Unlike most frontmen, Lindemann stated in an interview that he does not like being looked at while on stage, and would wear sunglasses to block out views of the audience. The main purpose of the band's signature pyrotechnics has also been stated to actually be a tool in taking the audience's attention away from Lindemann, whilst doubling as a spectacle for the audience. Lindemann often opts to just look directly at the mixing booth in the center of the crowd, except when directly interacting with an audience member.

In 2011, Roadrunner Records listed Lindemann at number 50 of the 50 greatest metal frontmen of all time.

On his 52nd birthday (4 January 2015), it was announced that Lindemann would start a new project with Peter Tägtgren named Lindemann. The band released their debut album Skills in Pills in June 2015. On 22 November 2019, Lindemann released their second album, F&M.

Lindemann was nominated for Best Narrative at the Berlin Music Video Awards 2020 with his music video ''Frau & Mann''. In 2021, his music video ''Alle Tage ist kein Sonntag'' received a nomination for Most Bizarre.

==== Guest appearances ====
Lindemann has featured alongside many other artists throughout his career, such as Feeling B, Apocalyptica, and his bandmate Richard Kruspe's solo project, Emigrate. He also wrote some lyrics in 2014 for German Schlager singer Roland Kaiser for his album Soul Tracks. In 2023, he appeared on "Child of Sin" by Kovacs.

=== Poetry ===
Lindemann has published three books of Poetrypoetry, all originally written in German and later translated into multiple languages.

==== Messer (2002) ====
Lindemann’s first poetry collection, Messer (Knife), was published in November 2002 and contains 54 poems written between 1995 and 2002. The poems were compiled by Gert Hof, author of the book Rammstein, who was also the band’s pyro designer. The book includes photographs of Lindemann with plastic mannequins taken by Jens Rötzsch. A few poems were later adapted into Rammstein lyrics. A Russian edition featuring paintings by Den Zozulya was released in 2018, after which Lindemann undertook a promotional tour in Russia that included special signing sessions. Lindemann showed up to his book signing in Moscow with an unknown person in a gimp costume. The female gimp was led through the crowd by Lindemann before he sat down to sign autographs and talk to fans. It is still unknown who was in the outfit, but suggestions are that of his girlfriend at the time.

==== In stillen Nächten (2013) ====
His second collection, In stillen Nächten (On Quiet Nights), was released in 2013 and features 97 poems, accompanied by illustrations from Matthias Mathies. More extensive than the last volume, the book has been translated into multiple languages, including English, French, and Russian. A number of the poems were later reworked into lyrics for Rammstein, Lindemann, and his solo releases. He commented on the poetry, saying "The vast majority of my poems could have been written a few hundred years earlier." In 2014, Lindemann presented two sculptures and his original scripts of poems from In stillen Nächten in a Dresden gallery.

==== 100 Gedichte (2020) ====
Lindemann’s third collection, 100 Gedichte (100 Poems), was published in 2020 and includes 100 poems, again illustrated by Matthias Mathies. The book has been translated into several languages, such as English, French, and Russian. As with his previous works, some poems were adapted into lyrics for Rammstein, Lindemann, and his solo material.

In 2025, Rammstein made available for purchase through their official website a complete edition containing all three of Lindemann’s poetry collections

==== Additional poetry projects ====
In addition to his three primary poetry collections, Lindemann has contributed to several other literary and artistic projects.

In 2015, the compilation Die Gedichte (The Poems) was released, bringing together the poems from Messer and In stillen Nächten into a single volume.

Together with Joey Kelly, Lindemann has published three illustrated travel books: Yukon (2017), Amazonas (2020), and Der Rhein (2024). These volumes feature landscape photography by Thomas Stachelhaus alongside poems written by Lindemann.

In 2018, Flemish sculptor Johan Tahon included six poems by Lindemann in his exhibition Wir überleben das Licht (We Survive the Light). The exhibition title was taken from one of Lindemann’s poems, which Tahon claimed he felt inspired by.

In 2023, the art book Am Sonntag muss ich sterben (I Must Die on Sunday) was released, containing 37 poems by Lindemann accompanied by 15 original etchings by Bodo W. Klös.

Lindemann has also occasionally shared original poems on social media, including Aus Rot wird Braun and Jegliches hat seine Zeit.

=== Film and television ===
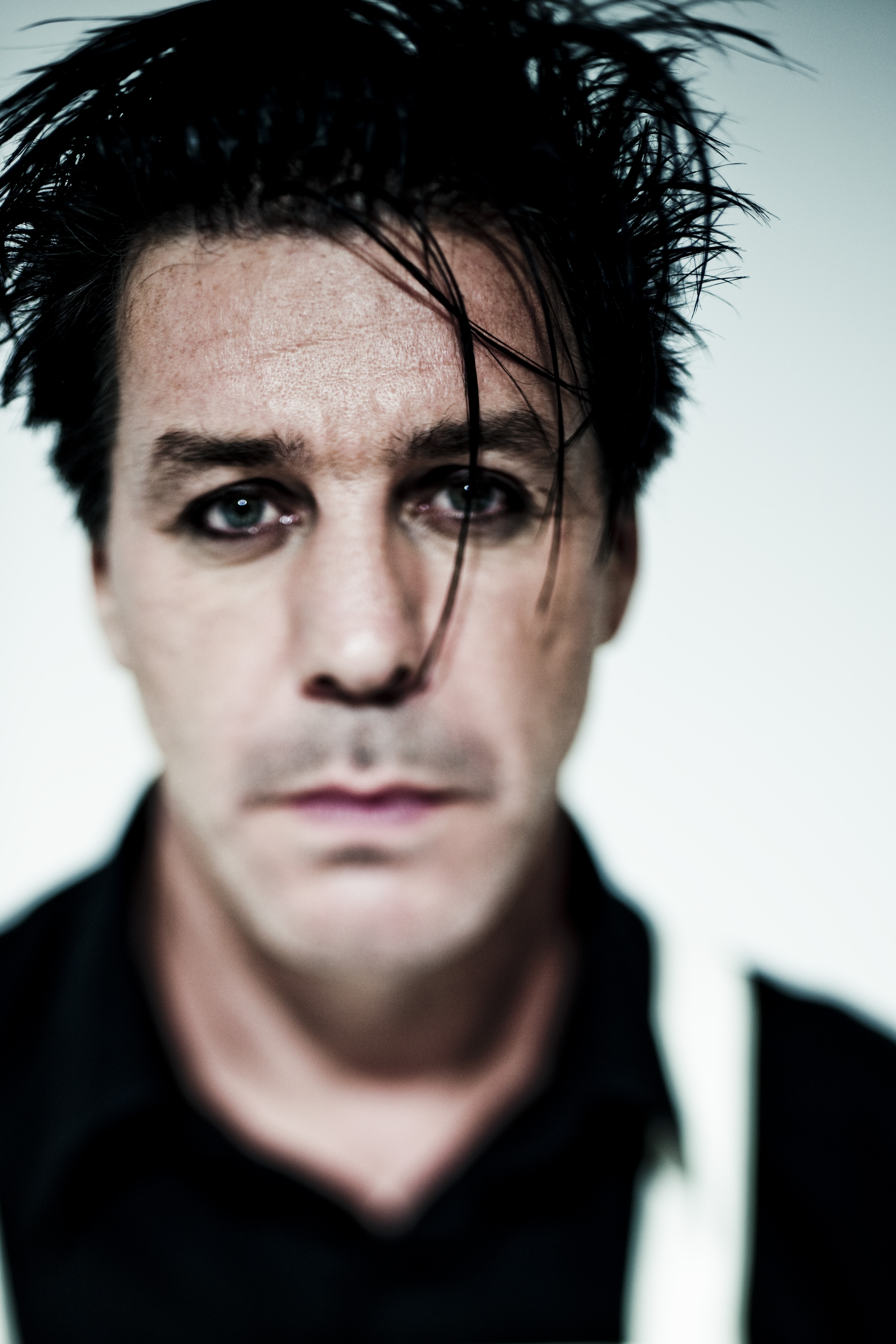
Lindemann in 2009

Two songs from the album Herzeleid were used in David Lynch's 1997 film, Lost Highway. Lindemann has also played minor roles in some films, appearing with his bandmate Christoph Schneider as musicians in the 1999 film Pola X, playing a character named Viktor in the children's comedy film Amundsen der Pinguin (2003), and also appearing as an animal rights activist in the 2004 film Vinzent. Lindemann and the rest of Rammstein also appeared in the 2002 movie xXx while performing "Feuer frei!" In July 2001, Lindemann, along with Flake, was interviewed by heavy metal anthropologist Sam Dunn for the VH1 Classic series Metal Evolution, on the topic of shock rock.

In 2021, Lindemann performed a Soviet war song Lubimy Gorod (Russian: Любимый город, Beloved Town) in Russian – originally sung by Mark Bernes in 1939 – for the Russian movie V2. Escape from Hell (Devyatayev).

== Musicianship ==
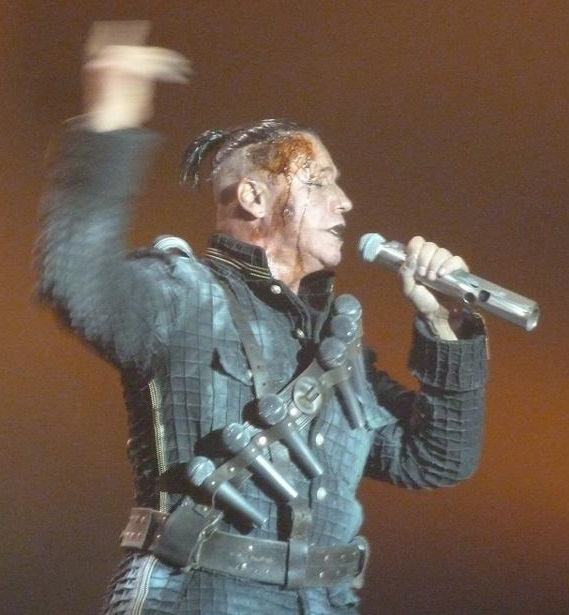
Lindemann during the Made in Germany tour, 2011

Lindemann's vocal range is that of a dramatic baritone. He has a tendency to press his voice with force from below and use the alveolar trill, stating in an interview that he sings it out of instinct. However, this trait could be connected to his youth years in Mecklenburg. In 2005, the New York Times commented on Lindemann's voice: "He commands a low, powerful bass rarely used in contemporary pop music, untrained but electrifying."

Lindemann himself describes his lyrics as "love songs". Some songs written by him have references to 19th century or earlier literature. For example, "Dalai Lama" from the album Reise, Reise is an adaptation of Goethe's "Der Erlkönig". He also used more of Goethe's poems, as "Rosenrot" contains elements from the poem "Heidenröslein", while "Feuer und Wasser" has narrative elements from Friedrich Schiller's "Der Taucher". Lindemann also used elements from Der Struwwelpeter by Heinrich Hoffmann on "Hilf mir" from the album Rosenrot. "Mein Herz brennt" has lyrics taken from a narrative line in the East German children's show Das Sandmännchen.

Lindemann has used contemporary literature for intertextual references; the song title "Non, je ne regrette rien" was used as a chorus for the song "Frühling in Paris", and the song lyrics of "Links 2-3-4" are based on the song "Einheitsfrontlied" by Bertolt Brecht. According to Lindemann, the lyrics of the song state the band's political category, positioning themselves on the left. He has also used another song composed by Brecht, titled "Mack the Knife", and the chorus was used for the song "Haifisch".

The song "Cowboy" is a criticism of the hypermasculine character of Americans. Despite "Hollywood propaganda", Lindemann states that it was actually the cowboys who beat up the Native Americans.

== Personal life ==
Lindemann has two children. His older child, a daughter, Nele, was born in 1985, and he spent the first seven years of her life as a single father. He has one grandson through Nele.

Lindemann is an atheist. In a 2011 interview, he said that he still has strong connections to the traditions of East Germany, and that he finds "detraditionalization" disturbing and believes there is "no longer any authenticity". He has said that he "hates noise" and often spends time in a small village somewhere in Mecklenburg-Vorpommern, the name of which he has not disclosed.

=== 2023 misconduct allegation ===
In June 2023, a woman alleged that her drink was spiked at a Rammstein concert in Lithuania and that a Russian woman on social media recruited her for sex with Lindemann. After the show, she was brought to a room with Lindemann and refused to have sex with him, as he reacted angrily and left. She emphasised that she was never sexually assaulted, but the story highlighted the band's "Row Zero" practice, where female fans who stood in a restricted area directly in front of the stage would be invited to pre- and after-show parties with Lindemann as potential sex partners.

Berlin prosecutors opened an investigation into sexual offences and the distribution of narcotics after more women claimed to have been "cast" for sex with Lindemann. Lindemann and the band denied all criminal wrongdoing. Lindemann's book publisher Kiepenheuer & Witsch dropped him as a client, claiming that a pornographic video he starred in and his 2013 book On Quiet Nights celebrated sexual violence. In August, an anonymous woman spoke to Der Spiegel claiming that she had a sexual relationship with Lindemann beginning in 2011 when she was 15. While she was above the age of consent in Germany, she felt she "was way too young" to understand what happened and it caused her "long-lasting damage".

On 29 August, the German prosecutors dropped the case, saying that the investigations did not provide any evidence and that they were unable to substantiate allegations as law enforcement agencies had not received direct testimony from the accusers.

On 15 May 2024, an investigation from the Vilnius police provided new findings that further refuted the accusation. With evidence indicating that the gaps in the woman's memory that she described and injuries she has alleged were due to her own consumption of a wide variety of alcoholic drinks and her use of cannabis.

Lindemann filed a criminal complaint against the German publication Der Spiegel. The investigation into the alleged sexual misconduct was dropped in August 2023 – the complaint alleges that the publication's reporting included falsified documents.

== Solo band ==
- Emily Ruvidich – guitars (2022–present)
- Danny Lohner – guitars (2025–present), bass (2022–2025)
- Brynn Route – keyboards (2022–present)
- Joe Letz – drums (2022–present)

=== Former contributors ===
- Krissy Kaminski – guitars (2022–2025)
- Jes Paige – guitars (2022–2025)
- Dani Sophia – guitars (2025)
- Constance Antoinette Day – keyboards (2023–2025)

== Discography ==
=== First Arsch ===
- Saddle Up (1992)

=== Rammstein ===
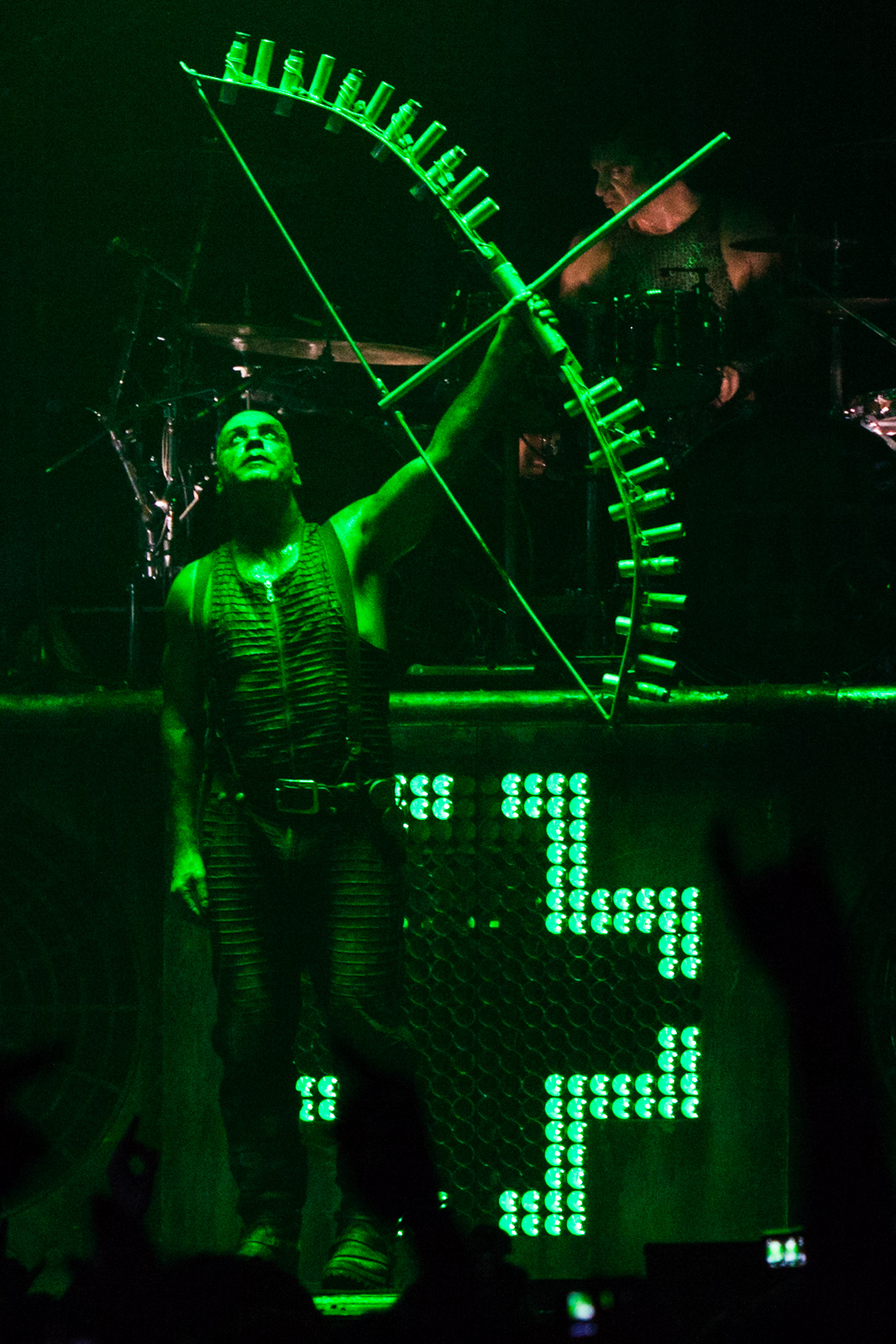
Lindemann performing "Du riechst so gut" in 2012

- Herzeleid (1995)
- Sehnsucht (1997)
- Mutter (2001)
- Reise, Reise (2004)
- Rosenrot (2005)
- Liebe ist für alle da (2009)
- Rammstein (2019)
- Zeit (2022)

=== Lindemann ===
- Skills in Pills (2015)
- F & M (2019)

=== Na Chui ===
- Till the End (2020)

=== Solo ===
==== Studio albums ====
- Zunge (2023)
- Zunge 2025 (2025)

==== Live albums ====
- Live in Kraków (2026)

==== Singles ====
- Alle Tage ist kein Sonntag (2020) – with David Garrett
- Любимый город (Lubimiy gorod, Beloved Town) (2021) – performed in Russian
- Ich hasse Kinder (2021)
- Entre dos tierras (2023) – Héroes del Silencio cover, performed in Spanish
- Übers Meer (Radio Edit) (2024)
- Übers Meer (Remix) (2024)
- Meine Welt (2024)
- Und die Engel singen (2025)
- Alles ändert sich (2025)
- Es brennt... (2026)

=== As a guest artist ===
- Lindemann appeared as a guest as drummer on the album Hea Hoa Hoa Hea Hea Hoa by Feeling B for the song "Lied von der unruhevollen Jugend", which is in Russian. The song was played at a Rammstein concert in St. Petersburg on 19 November (2001) during the Mutter tour.
- Lindemann provided vocals for the track Helden (a cover version of Bowie's Heroes) on the Apocalyptica album Worlds Collide.
- Lindemann also sings the song "Wut Will Nicht Sterben" by Puhdys.
- Lindemann and Richard Z. Kruspe covered the Aria song Shtil and released it as Schtiel (2003).
- Lindemann has also appeared on Knorkator's music video Du nich.
- Lindemann also sings on some songs with Richard Z. Kruspe, the songs Let's Go and Always On My Mind by Emigrate.
- In 2019 Lindemann collaborated with German rappers Deichkind, singing on the track 1000 Jahre Bier.
- Lindemann also sings a song with Zaz, the song Le Jardin Des Larmes (2021).
- Lindemann also appears on the song "Child of Sin" by Kovacs (2023).

== Poetry ==
- Lindemann, Till (2002). Messer [Knife]. Frankfurt am Main: Eichborn. ISBN 3-8218-0927-2.
- Lindemann, Till (2013). In stillen Nächten [In Silent Nights]. Köln: Kiepenheuer & Witsch. ISBN 978-3462045246.
- Lindemann, Till (2020). 100 Gedichte [100 Poems]. Köln: Kiepenheuer & Witsch. ISBN 978-3462053326.

== Tours ==
=== Lindemann ===
- Messer Tour (2018)
- Lindemann Tour (2020)

=== Solo ===
- Zunge Tour (2023–2024)
- Meine Welt Tour (2025)
- World Tour 2027

== Cited sources ==
- Bettendorf, Michele (2002). Ursprung Punkszene, oder: "Rammstein hätte es im Westen nie gegeben" (in German) (1st ed.). Book on Demand. ISBN 978-3831144938.
- Littlejohn, John T.; Putnam, Michael T. (2013). Rammstein on fire : new perspectives on the music and performances. Jefferson, North Carolina: McFarland & Company, Inc., Publishers. ISBN 978-0786474639.
