= Wendisch-Rambow =

Human settlement in Germany

Coordinates: 53.7756°N 11.4122°E

Wendisch-Rambow is a village of Schwerin in northern Germany. It is in the state of Mecklenburg-Western Pomerania. The population as of 1996 was approximately 201.

== History ==
Rambow is mentioned in 1282 in a document, in which Duke Mestwin II of the Stanislaus church, in guard of its father, confirmed donations. In 1531, it was held by Chorken. Rambow came into the possession of the Grumbkows in 1724. The Minister of State Philipp Otto von Grumbkow sold it 1733 at Joachim honour realm of Kettelhack, and of this they turned into the family from Kleist.

At the end of World War II, the Russians occupied this area and drove out the residents. The inhabitants of nearby Ramnitz could not escape the Russian advance. They hid in the Rambower forest and returned on the following day to the village. The East Prussia refugees had fled the Russians, but more people came after that. The Russians occupied Ramnitz in the evening hours of 8 March 1945.

Poland could, because of the Russian crew, only 1950 into the possession of the village set itself. The inhabitants were driven out at a relatively late time from their homeland. The residence card index Pommern determined 192 refugees from this village in the Federal Republic of Germany and 78 in the GDR. The German municipality, Ramnitz, became the Polish Karznica.

== Demographics ==
There were approximately 201 inhabitants in the village as of 1996.
