= First Arsch =

German punk rock band

- Origin: Schwerin, East Germany
- Genres: Punk rock; experimental rock
- Years active: 1986–present
- Members: Jörg E. Mielke; Volker Voigt; Tom Knopf
- Past members: Till Lindemann; Paul Landers; Richard Kruspe

First Arsch (lit. 'first arse') are a Schwerin-based German punk rock band formed in 1986 by Till Lindemann, the subsequent lead singer of German band Rammstein. In First Arsch, Lindemann initially played the drums.

The band would also book concerts under the name First Art due to the restrictions of East German authorities.

== History ==
First Arsch formed in 1986 when singer-bassist Jörg Mielke and then-drummer Till Lindemann met at Lindemann's birthday party. The group played concerts around East Germany and in the early 1990s recorded their debut album, Saddle Up, released in November 1992, with Paul Landers of Feeling B and Richard Kruspe of Das Elegante Chaos as guitarists.

In 1993, Lindemann, Kruspe and Landers left First Arsch to form Rammstein and Mielke replaced them with Volker Voigt and Tom Knopf. This lineup released a new song, "Das Schlagzeug fliegt da fast außernander", in 1995.

The band is still active, and occasionally performs in its members' hometown of Schwerin.

== Saddle Up ==
Saddle Up
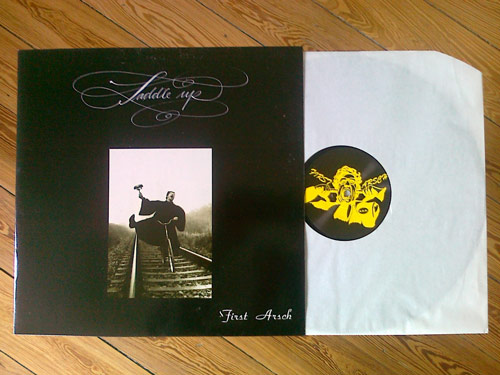

Studio album by First Arsch
- Released: November 1992
- Genre: Punk
- Length: 42:22
- Label: D.D.R / Kessel Records
- Producer: First Arsch

Saddle Up is First Arsch's first and only album. It was released in November 1992. The album's art was created by Matthias Mathies, who would later work together with Rammstein front man Till Lindemann on his book In stillen Nächten (English: In Silent Nights).

On 18 December 2020, the album was remastered and reissued on vinyl, and hit No. 44 on the German charts that Christmas.

=== Track listing ===
All tracks are written by First Arsch.

No.	Title	Length
1.	"Train"	2:25
2.	"Priest in Love"	3:05
3.	"SKA(T)"	2:11
4.	"In the Name of Love"	3:39
5.	"Crowded House"	2:59
6.	"Pregnant"	2:29
7.	"AHA-ha"	3:04
8.	"Superstition"	3:36
9.	"Saddle Up"	2:59
10.	"O-Cult"	2:33
11.	"Moder Blues"	2:09
12.	"Come Together"	2:54
13.	"Hip Hop Flop"	2:39
14.	"Chicken Steps"	2:04
15.	"Big Dong" (subtitled (für Saskia S.) on the original release)	4:00

The track "Pregnant" was misspelled as "Preagnant" on the original release.

=== Personnel ===
- Till Lindemann – vocals, drums
- Richard Kruspe – lead guitar, vocals
- Paul Landers – rhythm guitar, vocals
- Jörg E. Mielke – bass guitar, vocals
