= Kaffee Burger =

Club and artist bar in Berlin

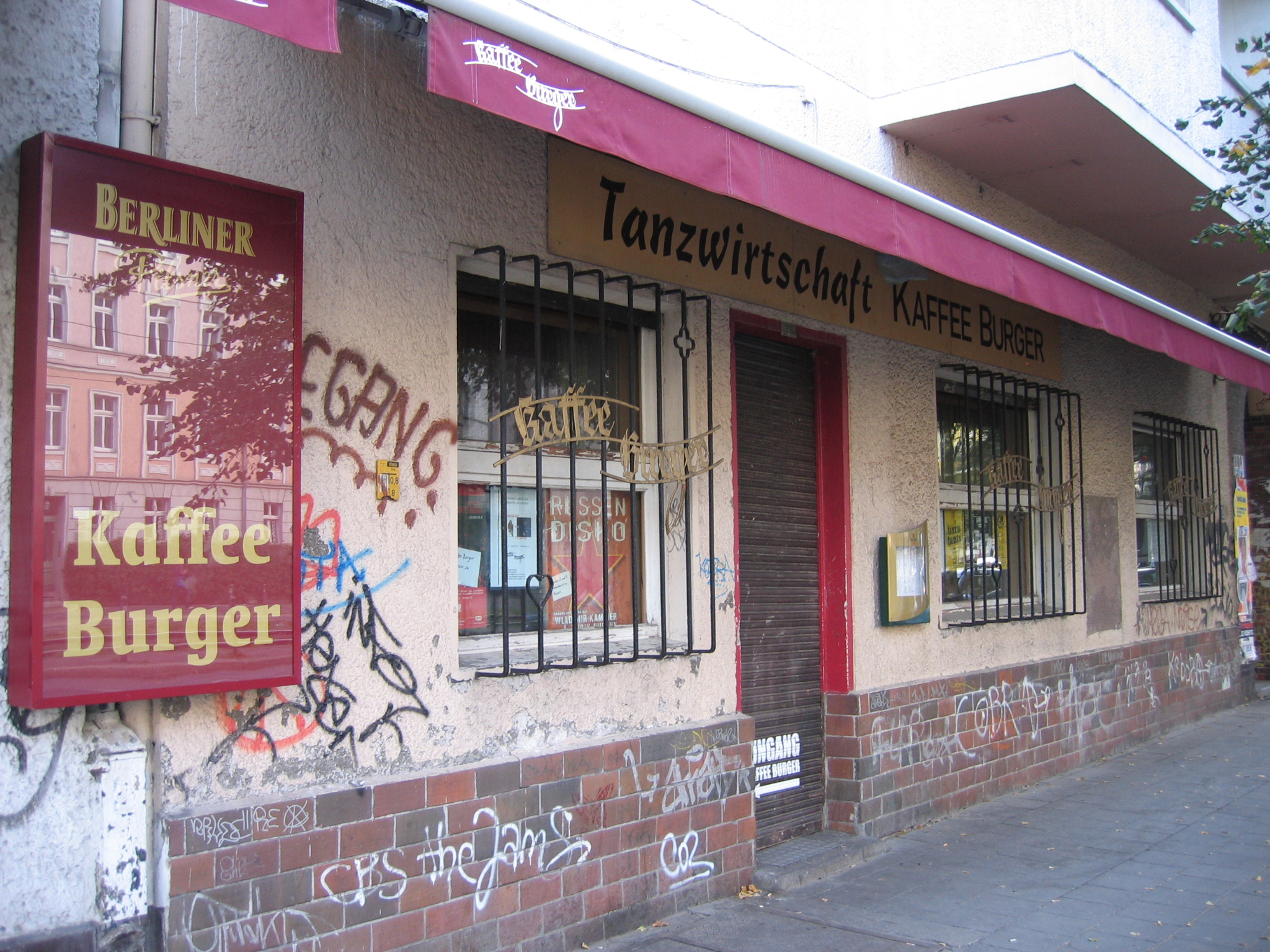
Street front

The Kaffee Burger is an artistic restaurant and club on Torstraße in Berlin-Mitte, Germany.

== History ==
The restaurant has existed since 1890. The restaurant continued to be run as a private company in the GDR. Since the 1970s, the Kaffee Burger became popular in East Berlin, with Volksbühne making a significant contribution to its popularity.
