= Feeling B =

Former German punk band

- Origin: East Berlin, East Germany
- Genres: Punk rock, experimental rock
- Years active: 1983–1993; 2007
- Past members: Aljoscha Rompe (died 2000); Christian "Flake" Lorenz; Paul Landers; Alexander Kriening; Christoph Zimmermann (died 1999); Christoph "Doom" Schneider

Feeling B was a punk rock band founded in East Berlin in 1983. They started out firmly grounded in the underground punk scene. Over time, Feeling B's popularity grew greatly, and climaxed around the end of the German Democratic Republic.

Frontman Aljoscha Rompe (1947–2000), a Swiss living in East Berlin, supplied the vocals to the band's songs. Rompe, guitarist Paul Landers, and keyboardist Christian "Flake" Lorenz were the only consistent members throughout the band's history. At various times, the band included bassist Christoph Zimmermann and drummers Alexander Kriening and Christoph "Doom" Schneider. Landers, Lorenz, and Schneider later found fame with Rammstein.

First Arsch drummer and future Rammstein singer Till Lindemann participated once with Feeling B for the song "Lied von der unruhevollen Jugend", an interpretation of a Russian communist song, for which he is credited on the album Hea Hoa Hoa Hea Hea Hoa. Landers contributed guitar to First Arsch's 1992 album Saddle Up. Lindemann and Landers, as members of Rammstein, performed this song live in St. Petersburg and Moscow in 2001, during that band's 'Mutter' tour.

On 9 November 1989, when the Berlin Wall fell, Feeling B was performing in West Berlin as part of a gig endorsed by the socialist government in order to promote the eastern side. Flake noticed some friends among the crowd that wouldn't normally be able to be there and was informed of the collapse of the wall. The band was unable to return home that night because all the holes through the wall were so crowded.

Feeling B released two albums following the fall of the Wall, Wir kriegen Euch alle in 1991 and Die Maske des Roten Todes in 1993, both more successful than their predecessor, according to Flake.

The group disbanded in the mid-1990s. On special occasions, the band members got together for individual concerts at punk festivals, until Rompe died in November 2000 of an asthma attack at 53 years old. Zimmermann died in a plane crash in 1999. Eventually, Lorenz re-discovered tapes of old and partial unreleased recordings. This unreleased material and remixes of some already known songs were released as Grün & Blau in 2007.

== Members ==
- Aljoscha Rompe – lead-vocals
- Christian "Flake" Lorenz – keyboards
- Paul Landers – electric guitar
- Alexander Kriening – drums, percussion (1983–1990)
- Christoph Zimmermann – bass guitar
- Christoph "Doom" Schneider – drums (1990–1993, 2007)

== Discography ==
- Hea Hoa Hoa Hea Hea Hoa (1989)
- Wir kriegen Euch alle (1991)
- Die Maske des Roten Todes (1993)
- Grün & Blau (2007)
