= Lindemann (band) =

German-Swedish metal band

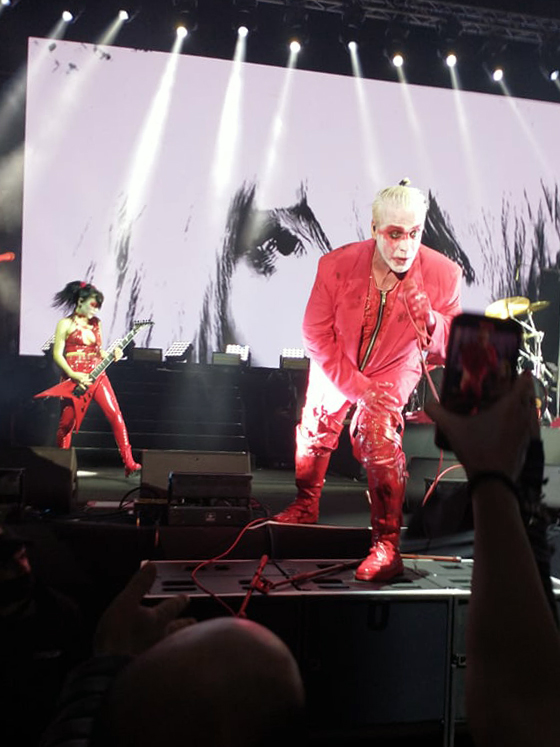
- Till Lindemann performing in 2022

Background information
- Origin: Germany
- Genres: Industrial metal; Neue Deutsche Härte
- Years active: 2014–2020
- Labels: Universal; Warner Central Europe
- Past members: Till Lindemann; Peter Tägtgren
- Website: lindemann.band
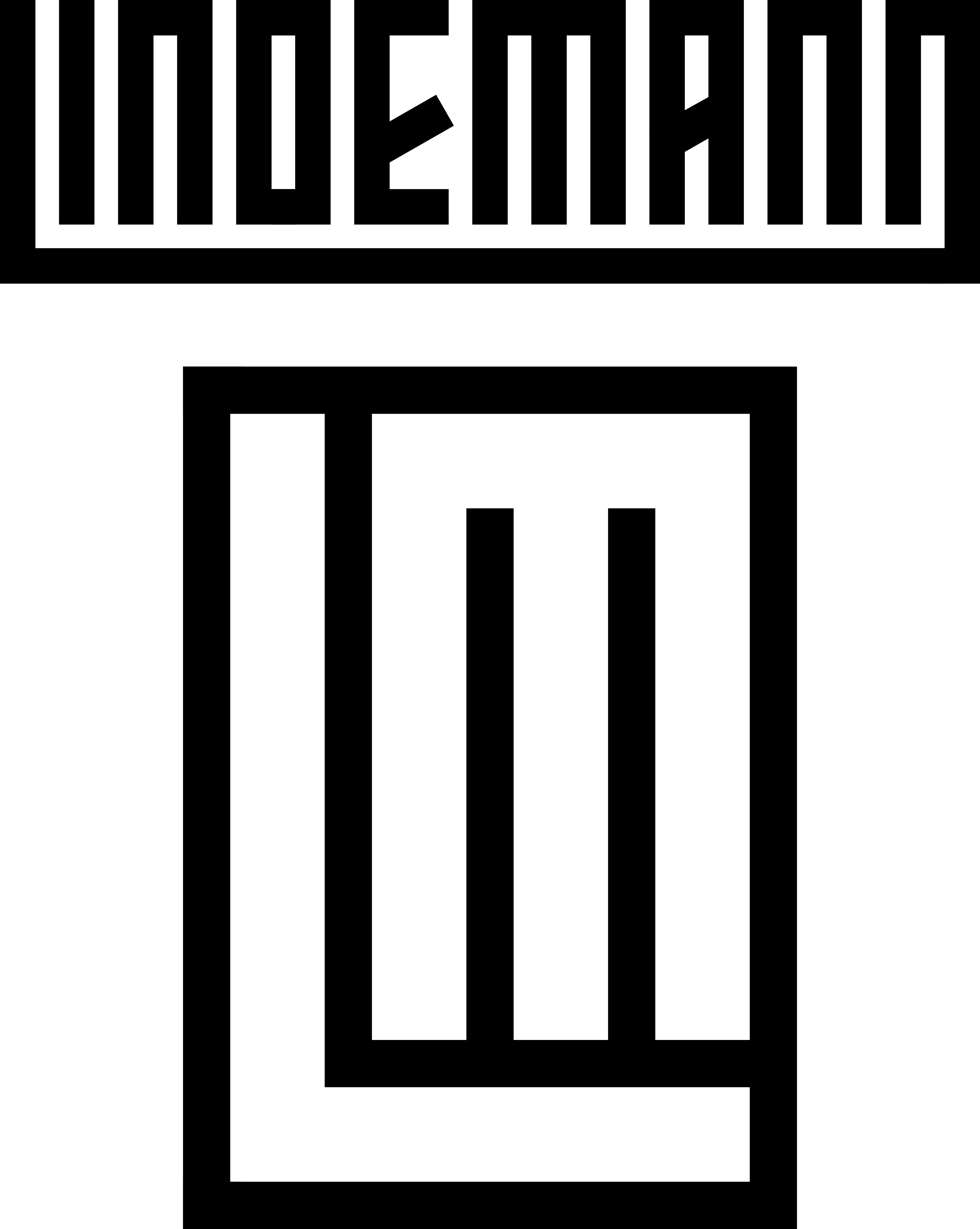

Lindemann was a German musical project fronted by vocalist Till Lindemann. It was formed in 2014 as a super-duo alongside Swedish multi-instrumentalist Peter Tägtgren. Tägtgren originally defined their sound as a cross between his project Pain and Lindemann's main band Rammstein, adding "at least it's a mix of Rammstein vocals and Pain music." Together, they released two studio albums Skills in Pills (2015) and F & M (2019), as well as the live album Live in Moscow (2021). After Tägtgren's departure from the band in 2020, Lindemann started releasing music under his own name.

== History ==
=== Origins and Skills in Pills (2013–2016) ===
Lindemann and Tägtgren met around the year 2000 in a rock pub in Stockholm, when members of Clawfinger introduced them to each other. In 2013, when Rammstein was headlining a festival in Sweden, the German singer invited Tägtgren to their show and proposed that they do a project together as Rammstein would be on a break for the next two years. They originally planned to do only one or two songs, but Tägtgren felt they were "too good" and wanted to write more.

The name of the band "was the only thing we couldn't come up with". All names considered by the band were already taken by other groups, so they eventually accepted a suggestion by somebody else and simply called it "Lindemann", though Tägtgren was initially unhappy with it.

On 28 May 2015, the band released its debut single "Praise Abort". Their debut studio album titled Skills in Pills was released on 19 June 2015. When asked about possible future live performances, Tägtgren said it would depend on fan response to the project. Lindemann joined Tägtgren and Pain on stage for an encore performance of "Praise Abort" on 9 November 2016 in Hamburg.

=== F & M and departure of Tägtgren (2018–2020) ===
In 2018, the duo composed music for an adaptation of the play "Hänsel und Gretel", with Till Lindemann also appearing in the play. In September, Lindemann and Tägtgren announced a tour of Russia, Ukraine and Kazakhstan in support of Lindemann's book "Messer".

On 16 August 2019, Peter Tägtgren announced that the new album was done, mixed and produced. On 10 September 2019, a teaser for the new single "Steh auf" was posted on social media announcing that the music video would be released on 13 September 2019. The music video featured Swedish actor Peter Stormare. The album F & M was released on 22 November 2019. In November 2019, the band announced a 2020 tour with members of Pain completing the live lineup. The band toured in February and March 2020, but the tour was cut short due to the COVID-19 pandemic.

In November 2020, the duo announced that their collaboration had ended and that their final release together would be a concert film of their 2020 show in Moscow. Till Lindemann announced his plan to continue recording in the future under the name "Till Lindemann" with a different lineup. Lindemann released his first solo single "Ich Hasse Kinder" on 31 May 2021. A short film with the same title premiered on 26 June 2021.

== Past members ==
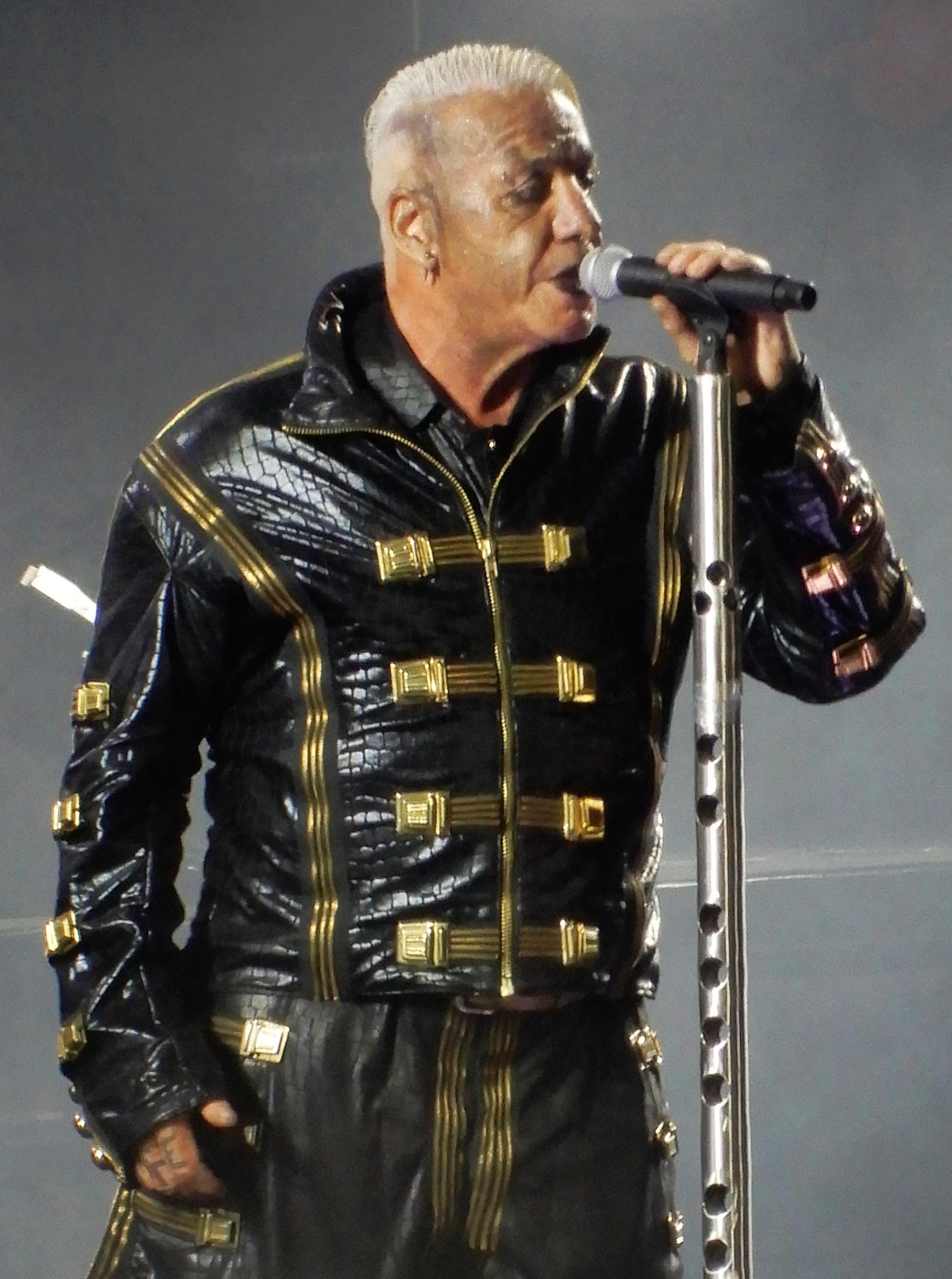
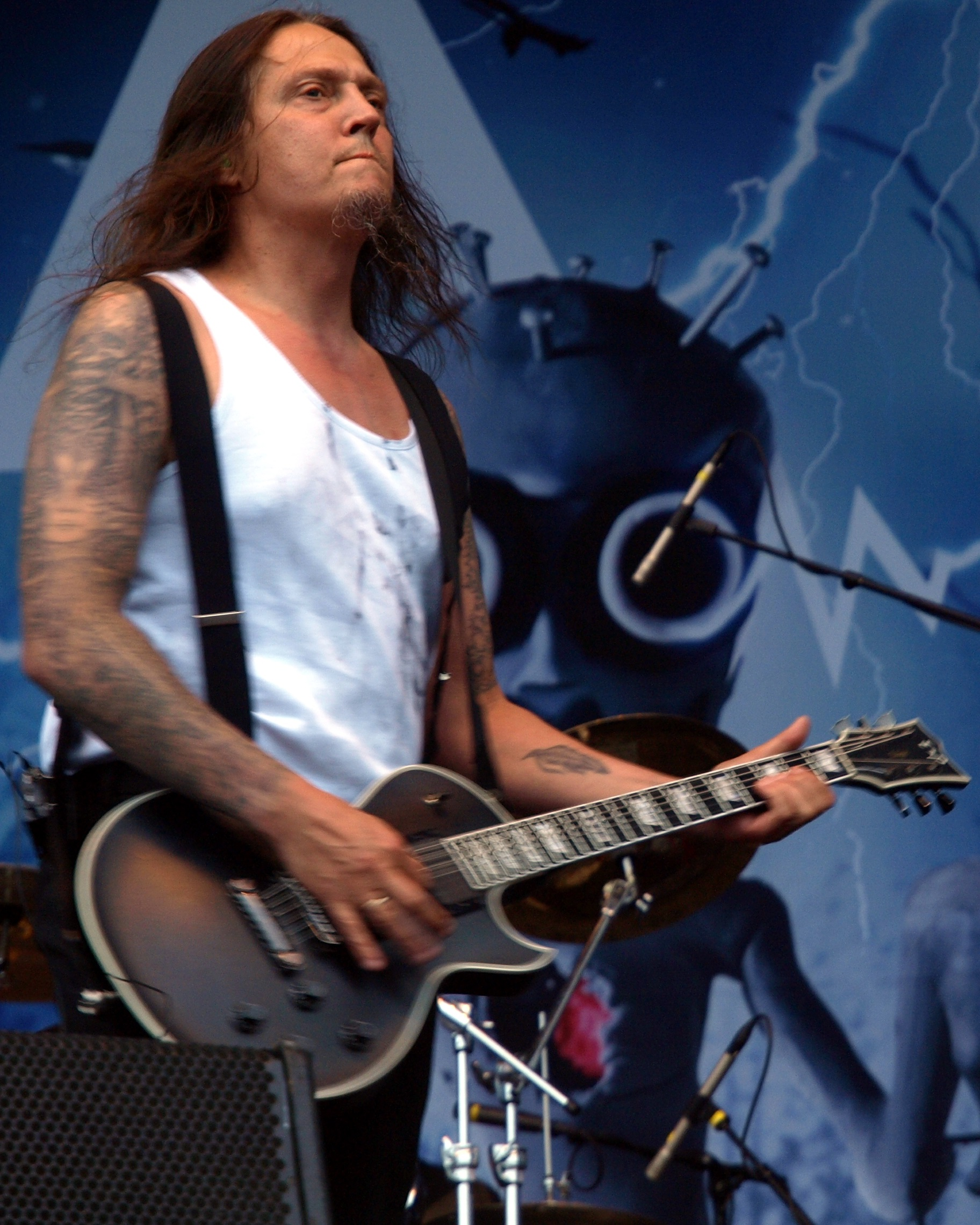
Till Lindemann and Peter Tägtgren
- Till Lindemann – vocals
- Peter Tägtgren – all instruments, production

=== Live/touring members ===
- Emily Ruvidich – guitars, backing vocals
- Danny Lohner – bass, guitars, backing vocals
- Joe Letz – drums
- Kristin Kaminski – bass
- Brynn Route – keyboards
- Sebastian Svalland – guitars
- Jonathan Olsson – bass
- Sebastian Tägtgren – drums
- Acey Slade – bass
- Jes Paige – guitars, backing vocals
- Dani Sophia – guitars, backing vocals
- Constance Antoinette – keyboards

== Discography ==
=== Studio albums ===
List of studio albums, with selected chart positions, sales figures and certifications
Title	Album details	Peak chart positions										Sales	Certifications
Title	Album details	GER	AUS	AUT	FIN	FRA	NLD	SWE	SWI	UK	US	Sales	Certifications
Skills in Pills	Released: 23 June 2015; Label: Warner Central Europe; Format: CD, LP, DL	1	17	3	1	16	6	27	2	35	144		BVMI: Gold
F & M	Released: 22 November 2019; Label: Universal; Format: CD, LP, DL	1	—	3	5	38	—	23	3	85	—		BVMI: Gold

=== Live albums ===
- Live in Moscow (2021)

=== Singles ===
List of singles, with selected chart positions and certifications, showing year released and album name
Title	Year	Peak chart positions		Album
Title	Year	GER	BEL (WA) Tip	Album
"Praise Abort"	2015	42	—	Skills in Pills
"Fish On"	2015	—	—	Skills in Pills
"Mathematik" (featuring Haftbefehl)	2018	—	—	F & M (Deluxe)
"Steh Auf"	2019	8	33	F & M
"Ich weiß es nich"	2019	82	—	F & M
"Knebel"	2019	—	—	F & M
"Frau & Mann"	2019	—	42	F & M
"Platz Eins"	2020	—	—	F & M
"Allesfresser (Unkle Reconstruction)"	2020	—	—	F & M
"—" denotes releases that did not chart or were not released in that country.

=== EPs ===
- Praise Abort (Remixes) (2015)

=== Music videos ===
- 2015 — "Praise Abort"
- 2015 — "Fish On"
- 2018 — "Mathematik"
- 2019 — "Steh auf"
- 2019 — "Ich weiß es nicht"
- 2019 — "Knebel"
- 2019 — "Frau & Mann"
- 2019 — "Ach so gern
- 2020 — "Ach so gern (One Shot Video)"
- 2020 — "Ach so gern (Pain Version)"
- 2020 — "Ach so gern (Clemens Wijers Version)"
- 2020 — "Ach so gern (Drago Baotić Version)"
- 2020 — "Platz Eins"

== Awards and nominations ==
Metal Hammer Awards (GER)

Year	Nominee / work	Award	Result
2015	Lindemann	Best German Band	Nominated
2015	Skills in Pills	Best Debut Album	Nominated

Berlin Music Video Awards

Year	Nominated Work	Category	Result
2020	FRAU & MANN	Best Narrative	Nominated
2020	KNEBEL	Most Bizarre	Nominated
