= Aljoscha Rompe =

German punk musician (1947–2000)

- Birth name: Arthur Alexander Rompe
- Born: 20 October 1947; Berlin, Soviet occupation zone (now Germany)
- Died: 23 November 2000 (aged 53); Berlin, Germany
- Genres: Punk rock
- Occupation: Singer
- Years active: 1974–2000

Arthur Alexander "Aljoscha" Rompe (20 October 1947 in Berlin-Buch – 23 November 2000 in Berlin-Prenzlauer Berg) was the lead singer of the East German punk band Feeling B.

== Career ==
Feeling B began in 1983 as part of the second wave of underground punk acts operating outside the state-sanctioned music scene. By the time East Germany (the GDR) imploded in 1989, Feeling B had become one of the country's most popular bands.

Soon after the fall of the Berlin Wall, Rompe co-founded the political party Wydoks, which wanted to reclaim public property on former GDR soil and fight against the takeover of the country by "money people", i.e. West Germans. He and like-minded members of the punk scene squatted several buildings in the East Berlin districts of Mitte and Prenzlauerberg. Rompe made films, ran pirate radio stations, and squatted for long periods of his life.

== Personal life ==
Rompe spent long periods of time camping on Hiddensee, in the Baltic Sea, with his bandmates, playing gigs, selling drinks and organizing underground festivals. He was of Swiss origin and died in Berlin in the year 2000 (aged 53), following a severe asthma attack. Christian "Flake" Lorenz, Rompe's friend and bandmate in Feeling B who later found fame with Rammstein, said "he knew how money was able to corrupt people, he didn't want to be successful in a monetary sense either, neither of us wanted to, as we were all punks."
