= Wir kriegen Euch alle =

Wir kriegen euch alle

Studio album by Feeling B
- Released: 1991
- Recorded: 1989–1990
- Genre: Punk rock, experimental rock
- Length: 41:35
- Label: Pirates Press

Feeling B chronology
Hea Hoa Hoa Hea Hea Hoa (1989)	Wir kriegen euch alle (1991)	Die Maske des Roten Todes (1993)

Wir kriegen euch alle (Loosely translated as "We'll Get You All") is the second album by the East German punk band Feeling B. It was released in 1991.

== Track list ==
1. Ich such die DDR (I'm Searching for the DDR)
2. Every Night
3. Dumdum Geschoß (Dumdum Bullet)
4. You Can't Beat the Feeling B
5. Slamersong
6. Izrael
7. Schlendrian (Spend)
8. Soviel was ich sah (As Much as I Saw)
9. Hopla He
10. Schampuuu-Schaum (Shampooo-Foam)
11. Finale
12. Unter dem Pflaster (Under the Pavement)
13. Du findest keine Ruh (You Can't Find Rest)
14. Revolution 89
