= Hea Hoa Hoa Hea Hea Hoa =

Studio album by Feeling B
- Released: 1989
- Genre: Punk rock, experimental rock
- Length: 40:06; 56:24 (1992 re-release)
- Label: Amiga; Zorg (1990 CD reissue); Pirates Press (1992 expanded CD reissue)

Feeling B chronology
Hea Hoa Hoa Hea Hea Hoa (1989)	Wir Kriegen Euch Alle (1991)

Hea Hoa Hoa Hea Hea Hoa is the first album by the East German punk band Feeling B. It was released in 1989.

It was initially released by the DDR state label Amiga on LP and Cassette. Shortly after reunification, Zorg released the album on CD. In 1992, Pirates Press reissued it with slightly different artwork and bonus tracks.

== Track list ==
1. "Artig" (Natured)
2. "Kim Wilde"
3. "Mix mir einen Drink" (Mix Me a Drink)
4. "Am Horizont" (On The Horizon)
5. "Frusti, machs gut" (Frusti, Rest In Peace)
6. "Geh zurück in dein Buch" (Get Back In Your Book)
7. "Lied von der unruhevollen Jugend" (Song of The Restless Youth)*
8. "Ohne Bewußtsein" (Without Consciousness)
9. "Alles ist so unheimlich dufte" (Everything Is So Exceptionally Fine)
10. "Du wirst den Gipfel nie erreichen" (You Will Never Reach The Summit)
11. "Tschaka" (Tschaka)
12. "Ich weiß nicht was soll es bedeuten" (I Don't Know What It Should Mean)

Bonus tracks

1. "Du findest keine Ruh" (You Can't Find Any Rest)
2. "Artig" (Natured)
3. "Mix" (Mix)
4. "Trance" (Trance)
5. "Der Klavierspieler" (The Piano Player)
- "Lied von der unruhevollen Jugend" is a Russian anthem that Rammstein has played live. That track began side B of the LP and cassette versions.
