= Teldex Studio =

Teldex Studio Berlin GmbH
- Founded: 2002
- Founder: Friedemann Engelbrecht, Tobias Lehmann, Martin Sauer
- Genre: classical, pop
- Country of origin: Germany
- Location: Berlin
- Official website: www.teldexstudio.de

Teldex Studio for sound recordings is in the borough of Lichterfelde in Berlin, Germany. It was named in 2002 as successor to the Teldec Studio, operated by Teldec Classics and, earlier, by Telefunken, on the same premises, and it underwent a major upgrade the following year. Its main live area, the "Hall", is 455 metres square, roughly 4,900 square feet. The upgrade (and rebuilding) replaced a 72-input Solid State Logic 9000 with a 48-input Studer 980 and an Avid 5-MC Controller. Teldex Studio came into existence after Warner Music wound down several operations of the labels Teldec Classics in Germany and Erato Disques in France and Teldec Studio members Friedemann Engelbrecht, Tobias Lehmann and Martin Sauer (Teldec's last managing director) chose to continue their work by establishing a new company. In 2002 the team began a cooperation with French label Harmonia Mundi. This was soon supplemented by contracts with Warner, BMG, Deutsche Grammophon, EMI, Sony Classical and independent labels. Projects have included Jonas Kaufmann and Helmut Deutsch's 2005 acclaimed traversal of Strauss Lieder for Harmonia Mundi, the Nielsen Wind Quintet with members of the Berlin Philharmonic for EMI in 2006, and Arcadi Volodos' intimate 2012 survey of Mompou's piano music for Sony.
