= Die Maske des Roten Todes =

Studio album by Feeling B
- Released: 1993
- Genres: Punk rock, experimental rock
- Length: 34:47; 76:01 (CD version)
- Label: Pirates Press

Feeling B chronology
Wir kriegen Euch alle (1991)	Die Maske des Roten Todes (1993)	Grün & Blau (2007)

Die Maske des Roten Todes (German: "The Masque of the Red Death") is the third album by German punk band Feeling B. It was released in 1993. It is named after a short story by Edgar Allan Poe.

== Track listing ==
1. "Vorwort" (Foreword)
2. "Heiduckentanz" (Hajduk-Dance)
3. "Rumba, Rumba" (Rhumba, Rhumba)
4. "Mystisches Mysterium" (Mystic Mysterium)
5. "Rotta" (Rotta)
6. "Traubentritt" (Grape Kick)
7. "Hammersong" (Hammersong)
8. "Tod des Florio" (Death of Florio)
9. "Die Pest" (The Pest)
10. "Cantigas" (Cantigas)
11. "Veris Dulcis" (Art Dulcis)

=== Bonus tracks on CD version ===
1. "Rumba Rai" (Rhumba Rai)
2. "Ankunft der Gesandten" (Arrival of the Messenger)
3. "Stockkampf" (Floor Fight)
4. "Nachwort" (Outro)
5. "Space Race"
