= Sleep Token discography =

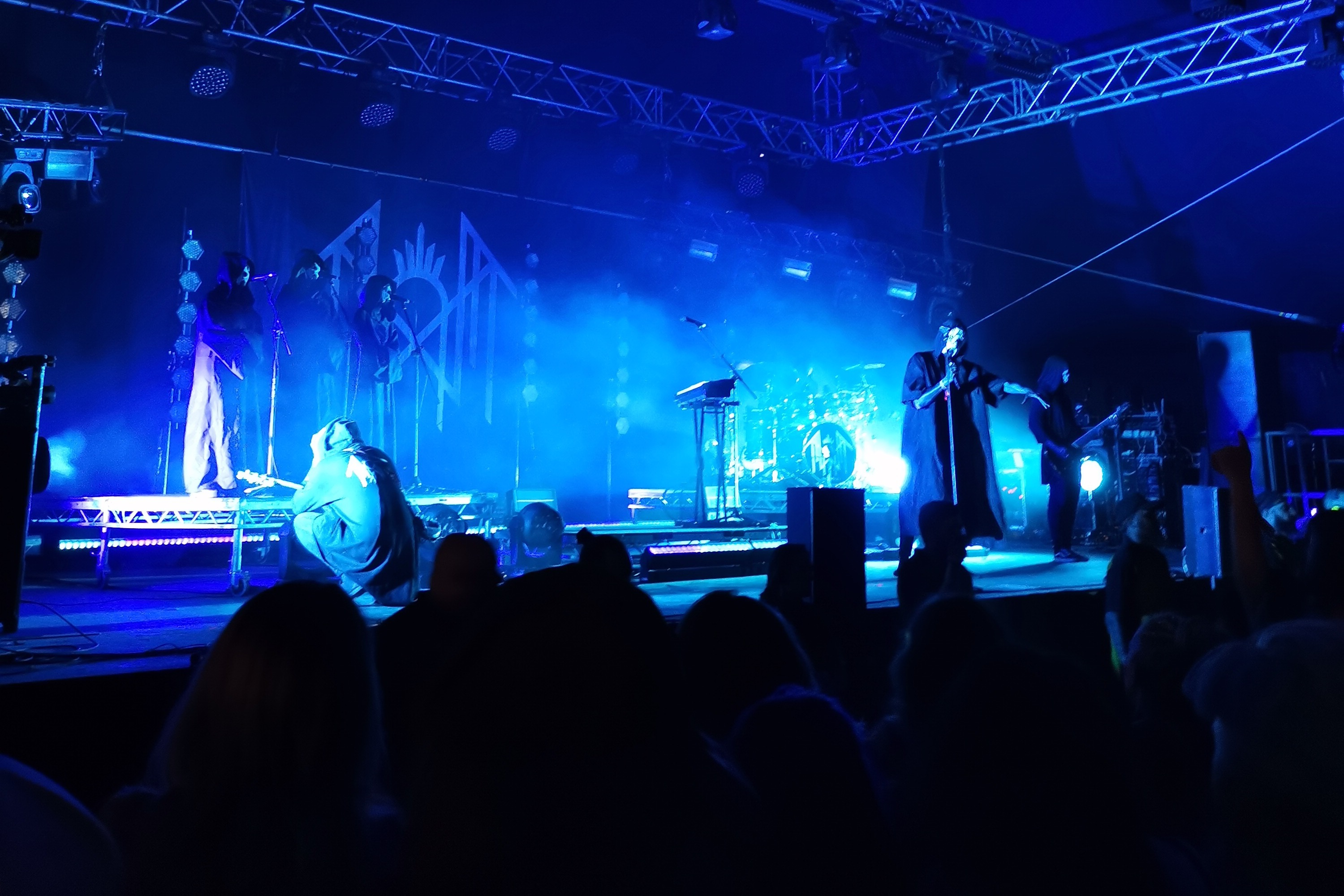
- Sleep Token performing live in 2022
- Studio albums: 4
- EPs: 2
- Singles: 19
- Music videos: 10

English rock band Sleep Token have released four studio albums, two extended plays (EPs), 19 singles, and ten music videos.

== Studio albums ==
List of studio albums, with selected chart positions, sales figures and certifications
Title	Album details	Peak chart positions										Sales	Certifications
Title	Album details	UK	AUS	AUT	BEL (FL)	CAN	GER	NZ	SCO	SWI	US	Sales	Certifications
Sundowning	Released: 21 November 2019; Label: Spinefarm; Formats: CD, 2LP, DL, streaming	— (Note: Sundowning did not enter the UK Albums Chart, but peaked at number 29 on the UK Albums Sales Chart.)	—	—	—	—	—	—	53	—	—	UK: 108,055	BPI: Silver
This Place Will Become Your Tomb	Released: 24 September 2021; Label: Spinefarm; Formats: CD, 2LP, DL, streaming	39	—	—	—	—	37	—	13	—	—	UK: 83,213	BPI: Silver
Take Me Back to Eden	Released: 19 May 2023; Label: Spinefarm; Formats: CD, 2LP, DL, streaming	3	3	12	47	69	5	12	4	24	16	UK: 167,039; US: 819,000	BPI: Gold; RIAA: Platinum; RMNZ: Gold
Even in Arcadia	Released: 9 May 2025; Label: RCA; Formats: CD, LP, DL, streaming	1	1	1	1	1	1	1	1	2	1	UK: 102,799; US: 127,000	BPI: Gold; ARIA: Gold; RIAA: Gold; RMNZ: Gold
"—" denotes a release that did not register on that chart.

== Extended plays ==
Title	EP details
One	Released: 2 December 2016; Label: none (self-released); Formats: CD, DL, streaming
Two	Released: 21 July 2017; Label: Basick; Formats: CD, DL, streaming

== Singles ==
List of singles as lead artist, with selected chart positions and certifications, showing year released and album/EP name
Title	Year	Peak chart positions										Certifications	Album/EP
Title	Year	UK	UK Rock	AUS	CAN	IRE	NZ	US	US Main.	US Rock	WW	Certifications	Album/EP
"Thread the Needle"	2016	—	—	—	—	—	—	—	—	—	—		One
"Calcutta"	2017	—	—	—	—	—	—	—	—	—	—		Two
"Nazareth"	2017	—	—	—	—	—	—	—	—	—	—		Two
"Jaws"	2018	— (Note: "Jaws" did not enter the UK Singles Chart, but peaked at number 35 on the UK Physical Singles Chart.)	—	—	—	—	—	—	—	—	—		Non-album singles
"Hey Ya!" (Outkast cover)	2018	—	—	—	—	—	—	—	—	—	—		Non-album singles
"The Way That You Were"	2018	—	—	—	—	—	—	—	—	—	—		Non-album singles
"Alkaline"	2021	—	—	—	—	—	—	—	—	—	—	BPI: Silver	This Place Will Become Your Tomb
"The Love You Want"	2021	—	—	—	—	—	—	—	—	—	—		This Place Will Become Your Tomb
"Fall for Me"	2021	—	—	—	—	—	—	—	—	—	—		This Place Will Become Your Tomb
"Is It Really You?" (with Loathe)	2022	—	—	—	—	—	—	—	—	—	—		Non-album single
"Chokehold"	2023	—	—	—	—	—	—	—	—	37	—		Take Me Back to Eden
"The Summoning"	2023	— (Note: "The Summoning" did not enter the UK Singles Chart, but peaked at number 54 on the UK Singles Sales Chart.)	14	—	—	—	— (Note: "The Summoning" did not enter the NZ Top 40 Singles Chart, but peaked at number 27 on the NZ Hot Singles Chart.)	—	— (Note: "The Summoning" did not enter the Mainstream rock chart, but peaked at number 2 on the Hot Hard Rock Songs Chart.)	22	—	BPI: Silver; RIAA: Platinum; RMNZ: Gold	Take Me Back to Eden
"Granite"	2023	—	—	—	—	—	—	—	31	38	—	BPI: Silver	Take Me Back to Eden
"Aqua Regia"	2023	—	—	—	—	—	—	—	—	—	—		Take Me Back to Eden
"Vore"	2023	—	—	—	—	—	—	—	—	— (Note: "Vore" did not enter the Hot Rock & Alternative Songs chart, but peaked at number 21 on the Hot Hard Rock Songs Chart.)	—		Take Me Back to Eden
"DYWTYLM"	2023	—	—	—	—	—	—	—	—	—	—		Take Me Back to Eden
"Emergence"	2025	17	1	38	78	81	— (Note: "Emergence" did not enter the NZ Top 40 Singles Chart, but peaked at number 8 on the NZ Hot Singles Chart.)	57	2	7	80	BPI: Silver; RIAA: Gold	Even in Arcadia
"Caramel"	2025	10	1	36	59	61	28	34	2	6	46	BPI: Silver; RIAA: Platinum	Even in Arcadia
"Damocles"	2025	25	1	54	69	92	38	47	—	11	83	RIAA: Gold	Even in Arcadia
"—" denotes a release that did not register on that chart.

== Other charted and certified songs ==
List of other charted songs, with selected chart positions, showing year released and album name
Title	Year	Peak positions									Certifications	Album
Title	Year	UK	UK Rock	CAN	NZ Hot	US	US Hard Digi.	US Hard Rock	US Rock	WW	Certifications	Album
"Ascensionism"	2023	—	27	—	34	—	—	7	33	—		Take Me Back to Eden
"Rain"	2023	—	—	—	39	—	—	9	36	—		Take Me Back to Eden
"Take Me Back to Eden"	2023	—	21	—	32	—	4	5	29	—	BPI: Silver; RMNZ: Gold	Take Me Back to Eden
"The Apparition"	2023	—	—	—	—	—	—	14	41	—		Take Me Back to Eden
"Are You Really Okay?"	2023	—	—	—	—	—	—	18	—	—		Take Me Back to Eden
"Euclid"	2023	—	—	—	—	—	—	19	—	—		Take Me Back to Eden
"Look to Windward"	2025	38	4	84	2	66	—	4	15	137		Even in Arcadia
"Past Self"	2025	— (Note: "Past Self" did not enter the UK Singles Chart, but peaked at number 97 on the UK Audio Streaming Chart.)	17	—	4	70	—	—	17	182		Even in Arcadia
"Dangerous"	2025	— (Note: "Dangerous" did not enter the UK Singles Chart, but peaked at number 82 on the UK Streaming Chart.)	23	76	3	56	—	1	11	129	RIAA: Gold	Even in Arcadia
"Even in Arcadia"	2025	31	2	80	1	61	—	—	14	123		Even in Arcadia
"Provider"	2025	—	21	—	—	77	—	7	20	—		Even in Arcadia
"Gethsemane"	2025	—	7	—	—	75	—	6	19	—		Even in Arcadia
"Infinite Baths"	2025	—	32	—	—	100	—	8	24	—		Even in Arcadia
"—" denotes a release that did not register on that chart.

== Music videos ==
Year	Song	Creator(s)	Album
2016	"Thread the Needle"	MindHackTV; Nyxea Illustrations	One
2016	"Fields of Elation"	MindHackTV; Nyxea Illustrations	One
2017	"Calcutta"	G1 Productions	Two
2017	"Nazareth"	G1 Productions	Two
2018	"Jaws"	Loki Films	Non-album singles
2018	"The Way That You Were"	Loki Films	Non-album singles
2020	"Blood Sport" (from the room below)	—N/a	Sundowning (Deluxe Edition)
2021	"Alkaline"	—N/a	This Place Will Become Your Tomb
2021	"The Love You Want"	Holly Stubbings (choreography)	This Place Will Become Your Tomb
2021	"Fall for Me"	—N/a	This Place Will Become Your Tomb
