= Et in Arcadia ego =

Et in Arcadia ego (Latin for 'Even in Arcadia, there am I') may refer to:

- A phrase often used in memento mori, an artistic and literary trope acting as a reminder of the inevitability of death
- Et in Arcadia ego (Poussin), also called The Arcadian Shepherds, a 1637–38 painting by French Baroque artist Nicolas Poussin
- Et in Arcadia ego (Guercino), a c. 1618–1622 painting by the Italian Baroque artist il Guercino
- "Et in Arcadia Ego" (Brideshead Revisited), a 1981 television episode
- The namesake phrase of Arcadia, a 1993 stage play written by Tom Stoppard
- "Et in Arcadia Ego" (Star Trek: Picard), a 2020 two-part television episode
- Even in Arcadia, a 2025 album by anonymous metal band Sleep Token
- Et in Arcadia Ego, an inscription on the rifle of Judge Holden as depicted in the novel Blood Meridian by Cormac McCarthy

== See also ==
- Arcadia (utopia), a vision of pastoralism and harmony with nature derived from the Greek region of the same name
- Eclogue 5, a pastoral poem by the Latin poet Virgil often considered the inspiration for the phrase
