= List of UK Rock & Metal Singles Chart number ones of 2025 =

The UK Rock & Metal Singles Chart is a record chart which ranks the best-selling rock and heavy metal songs in the United Kingdom. Compiled and published by the Official Charts Company, the data is based on each track's weekly physical sales and digital downloads . The first number one of the year was "Iris" by Goo Goo Dolls.

== Chart history ==
Issue date	Single	Artist(s)	Record label(s)	Ref.
3 January	"Iris"	Goo Goo Dolls	Warner	
10 January	"Iris"	Goo Goo Dolls	Warner	
17 January	"Iris"	Goo Goo Dolls	Warner	
24 January	"Iris"	Goo Goo Dolls	Warner	
31 January	"Iris"	Goo Goo Dolls	Warner	
7 February	"Iris"	Goo Goo Dolls	Warner	
14 February	"Iris"	Goo Goo Dolls	Warner	
21 February	"Iris"	Goo Goo Dolls	Warner	
28 February	"Iris"	Goo Goo Dolls	Warner	
7 March	"Iris"	Goo Goo Dolls	Warner	
14 March	"Iris"	Goo Goo Dolls	Warner	
21 March	"Emergence"	Sleep Token	RCA	
28 March	"Iris"	Goo Goo Dolls	Warner	
4 April	"Iris"	Goo Goo Dolls	Warner	
11 April	"Caramel"	Sleep Token	RCA	
18 April	"Iris"	Goo Goo Dolls	Warner	
25 April	"Iris"	Goo Goo Dolls	Warner	
2 May	"Damocles"	Sleep Token	RCA	
9 May	"Iris"	Goo Goo Dolls	Warner	
16 May	"Iris"	Goo Goo Dolls	Warner	
23 May	"Iris"	Goo Goo Dolls	Warner	
30 May	"Iris"	Goo Goo Dolls	Warner	
6 June	"Iris"	Goo Goo Dolls	Warner	
13 June	"Iris"	Goo Goo Dolls	Warner	
20 June	"Iris"	Goo Goo Dolls	Warner	
27 June	"Iris"	Goo Goo Dolls	Warner	
4 July	"Iris"	Goo Goo Dolls	Warner	
11 July	"Iris"	Goo Goo Dolls	Warner	
18 July	"Iris"	Goo Goo Dolls	Warner	
25 July	"Iris"	Goo Goo Dolls	Warner	
1 August	"Paranoid"	Black Sabbath	Sanctuary	
8 August	"Iris"	Goo Goo Dolls	Warner	
15 August	"Iris"	Goo Goo Dolls	Warner	
22 August	"Iris"	Goo Goo Dolls	Warner	
29 August	"Iris"	Goo Goo Dolls	Warner	
5 September	"Iris"	Goo Goo Dolls	Warner	
12 September	"Iris"	Goo Goo Dolls	Warner	
19 September	"Iris"	Goo Goo Dolls	Warner	
26 September	"Iris"	Goo Goo Dolls	Warner	
3 October	"Iris"	Goo Goo Dolls	Warner	
10 October	"Iris"	Goo Goo Dolls	Warner	
17 October	"Iris"	Goo Goo Dolls	Warner	
24 October	"Iris"	Goo Goo Dolls	Warner	
31 October	"Iris"	Goo Goo Dolls	Warner	
7 November	"Iris"	Goo Goo Dolls	Warner	
14 November	"Iris"	Goo Goo Dolls	Warner	
21 November	"Iris"	Goo Goo Dolls	Warner	
28 November	"Iris"	Goo Goo Dolls	Warner	
5 December	"Iris"	Goo Goo Dolls	Warner	
12 December	"Iris"	Goo Goo Dolls	Warner	
19 December	"Iris"	Goo Goo Dolls	Warner	
26 December	"Iris"	Goo Goo Dolls	Warner	

== See also ==
- List of UK Rock & Metal Albums Chart number ones of 2025
