= Shepherd's Monument =

Coordinates: 52°48′05″N 2°00′45″W

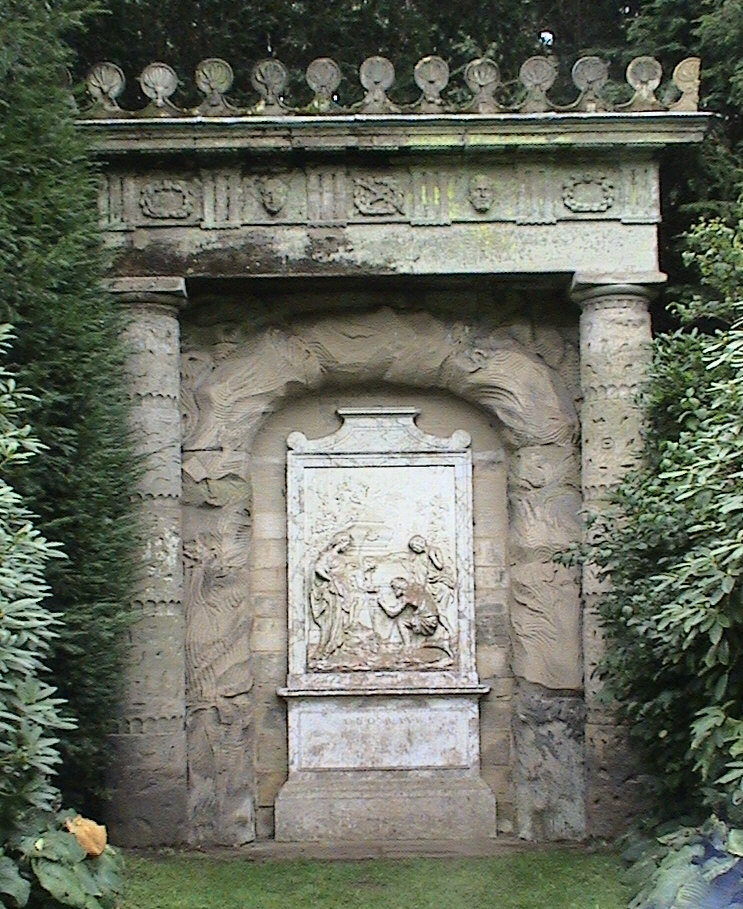
The Shepherds Monument, enclosed in its rustic arch

The Shepherd's Monument at Shugborough is one of a number of 18th-century structures in the park of Shugborough Hall, Staffordshire, England. It was commissioned by the owner of the park, Thomas Anson, who had an interest in Greek architecture. It consists of an entablature below which is a rustic arch enclosing a tomb-like structure which features a relief. The relief is the work of the sculptor Peter Scheemakers. Scheemakers also worked on another monument at Shugborough, the Arch of Hadrian.

Scheemakers's sculpture is based on a painting from the 1630s, the second version of Nicolas Poussin's The Shepherds of Arcadia. Scheemakers appears to have been working from an engraving because his relief is a mirror image of the painting (although the inscription runs left to right). The painting was available in versions by engravers such as Bernard Picart.

== Inscriptions ==
There are two inscriptions on the monument. One is part of the bas-relief and features the Latin words ET IN ARCADIA EGO which appear in the painting.

Fingers touching the letters 'N' and 'R' in the phrase ET IN ARCADIA EGO ("I am also in Arcadia")

The meaning of the phrase is somewhat ambiguous. The words are often taken as referring to death, but it could refer to something else.

Below the relief is a stone plaque displaying a ten-letter inscription. This cryptic inscription, the so-called Shugborough inscription, has been internationally well-known since 1982, as a result of being mentioned in the book The Holy Blood and the Holy Grail. During the time the Shugborough Estate was managed by Staffordshire County Council, there was an attempt to crack the code with the help of experts from Bletchley Park.

== Conservation ==
The monument has been protected as a Grade II* listed building since 1953. The Shugborough Estate currently belongs to the National Trust. It having been noted that the monument was adversely affected by being in a damp site, in 2010 the Trust took steps to remedy this.
