= Caramel (Sleep Token song) =

2025 single by Sleep Token

Single by Sleep Token

from the album Even in Arcadia
- B-side: "Emergence" (instrumental)
- Released: 4 April 2025
- Length: 4:50
- Label: RCA
- Songwriters: Vessel; II
- Producer: Carl Bown

Sleep Token singles chronology
"Emergence" (2025)	"Caramel" (2025)	"Damocles" (2025)

Visualizer
- "Caramel" on YouTube

"Caramel" is a song by anonymous English rock band Sleep Token, released on 4 April 2025 as the second single from their fourth studio album, Even in Arcadia. The song became the band's first top 10 single in the UK and first top 40 single in the US.

"Caramel" was nominated for a Grammy for "Best Rock Song" at the 68th Annual Grammy Awards.

== Release ==
=== Album campaign ===
The release campaign for the album began in February of 2025, starting with a series of cryptic social media posts on TikTok, Instagram and other platforms. On 19 February, the band released a TikTok video directing people to a website that teased new music, named showmehowtodanceforever.com. The video marks the first appearance of the black flamingo, the presumed "Feathered Host", that serves as the ambassador to Arcadia. In order to access the site's contents, visitors had to arrange letters on the page in the correct sequence of the Shugborough inscription, which is associated with the painting Et in Arcadia ego ("Shepherds of Arcadia"). The website allowed users to enter their e-mail address and could "choose their allegiance" to one of two houses they preferred to be a part of: 'The Feathered Host' or 'House Veridian'.

On 27 February, private Instagram accounts for each house were created, to which untitled piano sheet music was posted, later revealed to be the instrumental version of "Even in Arcadia".

=== Song release ===
Sleep Token teased the song via American weatherman Chris Michaels, who is known for referencing metal lyrics in his weather reports based in North Carolina. Michaels posted a video on social media announcing a release from Sleep Token on 27 March 2025, following with two more on 29 March and 2 April. Each teaser included a puzzle regarding the song in a weather segment for fans to guess and the date of the next update.

One day before the release, the final teaser was released, showing the black "Feathered Host" flamingo walking inside what looks like a great hall of a mansion, with ambient music in the background.

On the day of release, the track was accompanied by a visualiser video which depicts a green banner with the "Caramel" coat of arms hung on a black stand, placed on a platform in the great hall, slowly burning as the song plays.

A limited edition vinyl was released for Record Store Day on 18 April 2026 - a 12" liquid-filled vinyl with "Caramel" on the A-side and the instrumental version of "Emergence" on the B-side, previously only on the Japanese album release as a bonus track.

== Concept and composition ==
No details were provided by the band, leaving listeners to speculate amongst themselves the underlying meaning of "Caramel" and how it connects to the overarching story of Even in Arcadia. The album was described as the start of "a new chapter" after the events of Take Me Back to Eden. (Note: "This new chapter follows Take Me Back To Eden and continues the unfolding journey, where Sleep Token further intertwines the boundaries of sound and emotion, dissolving into something otherworldly".) The lyrics find Vessel exploring his struggles with fame, including achieving it from music made from his own sadness, and dealing with fans attempting to uncover Sleep Token's real identities.

=== Lyrics ===
Sammi Caramela of VICE wrote that the pop-like sound of the music "disguises a long-ignored cry for respect and privacy" and that the lyrics "are a testament to [Vessel's] struggles in the public eye", such as "Acting like I'm never stressed out by the hearsay / Guess that's what I get for hiding in the limelight ... / Everybody wants on 'em, I just wanna hear you sing that topline". Liberty Dunworth of NME also pointed out how the lyrics deal with the "element of anonymity", like "Every time they try to shout my real name just to get a rise from me". Those lyrics refer to at least one real-life incident caught on camera and posted to social media. At the end of a performance, a few people in a crowd yell out Vessel's real first name, and in acknowledgement, Vessel spits on the ground and gives them the middle finger as he walks off stage.

"Genius" writer Kevin Loo also believes that Vessel is also struggling with a few "paradoxes", citing such lyrics as "right foot in the roses, left foot on a landmine" and "they can sing the words while I cry into the bassline." Vessel is grateful for Sleep Token's "followers", but expressing his "private pain" can be taxing after a while. He adds that Vessel eventually concedes to the place he finds himself in: "Too blessed to be caught ungrateful, I know/So I'll keep dancing along to the rhythm."

=== Musical style ===
Quentin Thane Singer of Forbes called the single "genre-bending" with "many melodic and heavy moments." It starts with a "music box...motif" - "soft", "soothing" and sounds "stripped-down" for the first two minutes. The song gradually becomes more "danceable" with a reggaeton beat and an "atmospheric", pop-influenced chorus. A breakdown in the style of deathcore metal occurs three and a half minutes into the song, with "pummeling moments" at the end.

== Reception ==
=== Critical ===
Reviews of "Caramel" were positive on the whole. Gregory Adams at Revolver praised the song's "genre-defying instrumentation" with Vessel's "expressive vocals. Quentin Thane Singer at Forbes thought the use of "reggaeton grooves" in the song was the "biggest surprise" and the most "interesting aspect" of the song. He was impressed by how they "innovatively amalgamated the latin style with metal music." Staff writers at Blabbermouth thought that the combinations of the melodies and rhythms were a "unique mix of tender beauty and unrelenting force", and the lyrics were full of "haunting vulnerability and unspoken pain."

=== Commercial ===
"Caramel" earned Sleep Token their first UK "Top 10" hit at number 10 on the Top 40 Singles chart. They also took the number 1 spot on the UK Rock & Metal Singles chart. In the US, it debuted at number 1 on the US Billboard Hot Hard Rock Songs chart, number 6 on the US Hot Rock & Alternative Songs chart, and landed at number 34 on the US Billboard Hot 100 for one week after its release.

=== Accolades ===
In November 2025, "Caramel" was nominated for 'Best Rock Song' at the 2026 Grammy Awards. It won 'Radio Song of the Year' at the 2025 Nocturnal Awards one month later. It also received acclaim from the New York Times with writer Jon Caramanica placing it atop his "50 Best Songs of 2025" list.

Year	Organization	Category	Result	Ref.
2025	The New York Times	Best Song of the Year	Won	
2026	Grammy Awards	Best Rock Song	Nominated	
2026	Nik Nocturnal Awards	Radio Song of the Year	Won	

== Personnel ==
Adapted from Tidal.

- Carl Bown – production, engineering, mixing
- Jim Pinder – engineering
- Adam "Nolly" Getgood – additional studio production
- Sebastian Sendon – additional engineering, drum editing
- Ste Kerry – mastering
- Vessel1 - composer, lyricist
- Vessel2 - composer

== Charts ==
=== Weekly charts ===
Weekly chart performance for "Caramel"
Chart (2025)	Peak position
Australia (ARIA)	36
Canada (Canadian Hot 100)	59
Global 200 (Billboard)	46
Ireland (IRMA)	61
Lithuania Airplay (TopHit)	52
New Zealand (Recorded Music NZ)	28
Portugal (AFP)	178
Sweden Heatseeker (Sverigetopplistan)	5
UK Singles (Official Charts)	10
UK Rock & Metal (Official Charts)	1
US Billboard Hot 100 (Note: The URL shows April 19, 2025 but the chart shows April 12, 2025.)	34
US Hot Hard Rock Songs (Billboard)	1
US Hot Rock & Alternative Songs (Billboard)	6

=== Year-end charts ===
Year-end chart performance for "Caramel"
Chart (2025)	Position
US Hot Rock & Alternative Songs (Billboard)	19

== Certifications ==
Certifications for "Caramel"
Region	Certification	Certified units/sales
United Kingdom (BPI)	Silver	200,000^{‡}
United States (RIAA)	Platinum	1,000,000^{‡}
^{‡} Sales+streaming figures based on certification alone.
