= Vore =

Vore may refer to:

- -vore, a Latin suffix related to eating
- Vorarephilia, a typically erotic desire or sexual fantasy to be consumed or to consume another
- A monster, also known as Shalrath, in the 1996 video game Quake
- Vorë, a commune in Albania
- "Vore", a song by Sleep Token from Take Me Back to Eden
