= Emergence (song) =

Single by Sleep Token

from the album Even in Arcadia
- B-side: "Even in Arcadia (instrumental)"
- Released: 13 March 2025
- Genre: Progressive metal; trap; pop; djent
- Length: 6:26
- Label: RCA
- Songwriters: Vessel; II
- Producer: Carl Bown

Sleep Token singles chronology
"DYWTYLM" (2023)	"Emergence" (2025)	"Caramel" (2025)

Visualizer
- "Emergence" on YouTube

"Emergence" is a song by anonymous English rock band Sleep Token. It was written by Vessel and II, produced by Carl Bown, and released on 13 March 2025. It was chosen as the lead single from the band's fourth studio album, Even in Arcadia, which was their first album released by RCA Records after signing with them in 2024.

The track was Sleep Token's first to register on the main singles charts in both the UK and the US, reaching number 17 on the UK Singles Chart and number 57 on the US Billboard Hot 100. "Emergence" was nominated for a Grammy for "Best Metal Performance" at the 68th Annual Grammy Awards in 2026.

== Release ==
=== Album campaign ===
The release campaign for the album began in February of 2025, starting with a series of cryptic social media posts on TikTok, Instagram and other platforms. On 19 February, the band released a TikTok video directing people to a website that teased new music, named showmehowtodanceforever.com. The video marks the first appearance of the black flamingo, the presumed "Feathered Host", that serves as the ambassador to Arcadia. In order to access the site's contents, visitors had to arrange letters on the page in the correct sequence of the Shugborough inscription, which is associated with the painting Et in Arcadia ego ("Shepherds of Arcadia"). The website allowed users to enter their e-mail address and could "choose their allegiance" to one of two houses they preferred to be a part of: 'The Feathered Host' or 'House Veridian'.

On 27 February, private Instagram accounts for each house were created, to which untitled piano sheet music was posted, later revealed to be the instrumental version of "Even in Arcadia". The song would appear on the "Emergence" 7-inch vinyl as well as on the Japanese version of the album as a bonus track.

=== Song release ===
After hinting at a possible tour three days before, on 13 March, Sleep Token simultaneously released "Emergence", announced the album title and release date of 9 May, and announced their U.S. arena headlining tour with confirmed dates, which was set to commence in September. The website also launched brand new merchandise to celebrate the album, available to pre-order.

The track was accompanied by a visualiser video which depicts a green banner with a coat of arms and three axes, standing amid a "flowery pink landscape", slowly burning as the song plays.

== Concept ==
No details were provided by the band, leaving listeners to speculate amongst themselves the underlying meaning of "Emergence" and how it connects to the overarching story of Even in Arcadia. The album was described as the start of "a new chapter" after the events of Take Me Back to Eden. (Note: "This new chapter follows Take Me Back To Eden and continues the unfolding journey, where Sleep Token further intertwines the boundaries of sound and emotion, dissolving into something otherworldly".)

Writer Pete Bailey of Primordial Radio believes that the song is about the aftermath of Vessel "[escaping] control" of 'Sleep', reflecting on past events and on the person he was during that relationship, while also giving himself permission to move forward. Ultimately, it is about Vessel regaining his "bodily and cosmic power" to emerge as an independent (human) being.

== Composition ==
=== Lyrics ===
Similarly to Bailey, Revolver writer Gregory Adams suggested that "the vibe [of the song] seems to hinge on people being on the precipice of a major change, citing the lyrics "it's time to come out from underneath who you were" and "you know that it's time to emerge". Putting the theory put forth by Primordial Radio in context, the 'you' that Vessel references in the lyrics is likely a past version of himself. Adams describes some of the lyrics as "poetic" and "mystical", while other lyrics like "“burst out of my chest and hide out in the vents” as "Xenomorph-like wordplay", referencing the 1979 sci-fi film Alien.

Not only do the lyrics allude to Vessel escaping 'Sleep', but possibly about him getting revenge: "Godspeed to my enemies who've been askin' for that call sign / You know the behaviour, canines of the saviour / Glory to the legion, trauma for the neighbours." "Canines of the saviour" is another way of phrasing "Teeth of God" - the name of Sleep Token's 2023 and 2024 tours in support of Take Me Back to Eden as well as their graphic novel published in 2024.

=== Musical style ===
In reviewing "Emergence" for NME, Rishi Shah drew comparisons to "Ascensionism" and "Take Me Back to Eden", tracks on Sleep Token's previous album, noting the similarities in length and the "effortless switch" between multiple genres in one song. He also describes the guitar tapping in the song as "Avenged Sevenfold-esque". To illustrate his thoughts further, Shah recounted all four 'acts' of the track. The first act contains piano and guitar which carry "the hallmarks of a more blissful new chapter", before transitioning into heavier sections with guitar and "trap-pop". The third and fourth acts contain "one signature...chorus" and "an extended jazz outro", courtesy of Gabi Rose, a touring saxophonist with Bilmuri who Sleep Token toured with in 2024. Writers at Revolver identified similar compositional elements, noting the track's opening with "soulful vocals, sparse piano and ambient hum", which is then followed by "skittering electronic beats", "heavy downtuned riffage" and an "epic climax".

In a feature published by Rock Sound analysing the musicality of "Emergence", four experts weighed in on what made the song unique and successful. Conductor Edwin Outwater thought it sounded like "a prog metal ballad" which later "transforms into something new..." He believed that the band choose multiple genres "intentionally" to make something that sounds different. Composer and Berklee music professor Shaun Michaud likened its style to pop music, specifically naming Taylor Swift, Duran Duran, Toto, and King Crimson as possible influences. Classic music commentator Kyle Macdonald could hear elements of opera music in the song, highlighting "the drama of the shifts in the instrumentation, from piano, to gentle guitar, then to full metal orchestration". Lastly, Simon Hall, Head of Music Technology at the Royal Birmingham Conservatoire, noted that the song was composed in "E natural minor", which, according to Ernst Pauer, an early 1900s musicologist, "[represented] grief, mournfulness and restlessness of spirit…" which is contradictory towards the existing theories of what or who the song is about.

== Reception ==
=== Critical ===
Media response to "Emergence" was positive. Revolver called the track "stunning", while Quentin Thane Singer of Forbes dubbed it "another great offering" and "very dynamic", citing the saxophone outro "a notable sonic aspect" of the song. Rishi Shah of NME awarded the single four stars out of five, claiming that it "showcases [Sleep Token] at their sprawling, genre-defying best" with no traces of "anything commercial" despite being signed to a major label.

Each of Revolver's music experts praised something different from the song. Edwin Outwater claimed there was "really interesting songwriting" and that the song was successful because it was "full of [musical] references constantly... but it still sounds like a different thing." Shaun Michaud complimented the pop elements of the song: "...the timbre goes so strange on that hook of ‘go ahead and wrap your arms around me'... there’s a lot of textures in there, and they’re all amazing ear candy…". He also thought the song was "well recorded" from an engineer's perspective. Simon Hall focused on the metal elements: "There’s many different influences... but they are still very much within that metal sound in terms of the drum production." He also thought the "structural cohesion" of the sound and tempo was "clever." Kyle Macdonald was impressed by Vessel's voice: "The singer’s baritone voice has great sonority, that hits you like it’s Tchaikovsky." Similar to Hall, he praised the "harmony" present in the song: "[it] becomes the glue that holds together the journey through so many vocal and instrumental styles.”

In November 2025, "Emergence" was nominated for the award of Best Metal Performance at the 68th Annual Grammy Awards.

=== Commercial ===
Upon its release, "Emergence" became Sleep Token's first song to register on the UK Singles Chart, debuting at number 17. It also debuted at number 30 on the UK Singles Downloads Chart, number 31 on the UK Streaming Chart, and number 32 on the UK Singles Sales Chart.

The single was also a success in the United States, achieving two major "firsts" on the Billboard charts. It was the band's first to register on the main US Billboard Hot 100 chart, debuting at number 57, and topped the Hot Hard Rock Songs chart. It also peaked at number seven on the Hot Rock & Alternative Songs chart. Additionally, it received 9.9 million streams in the US during the first week of its release.

Elsewhere, "Emergence" reached number 8 in New Zealand, number 38 in Australia, number 78 in Canada, and number 81 in Ireland.

== Personnel ==
Adapted from Tidal.

- Carl Bown – production, engineering, mixing
- Jim Pinder – engineering
- Adam "Nolly" Getgood – additional studio production
- Sebastian Sendon – additional engineering, drum editing
- Ste Kerry – mastering
- Gabi Rose (from Bilmuri) – saxophone
- Vessel – vocals, piano, guitar
- II – drums

== Charts ==
=== Weekly charts ===
Weekly chart performance for "Emergence"
Chart (2025)	Peak position
Australia (ARIA)	38
Canada (Billboard Hot 100)	78
Global 200 (Billboard)	80
Ireland Singles Chart (IRMA)	81
New Zealand Hot 40 Singles (RMNZ)	8
UK Singles (OCC)	17
UK Rock & Metal (OCC)	1
US Billboard Hot 100	57
US Hot Rock & Alternative Songs (Billboard)	7
US Hot Hard Rock Songs (Billboard)	1
US Rock & Alternative Airplay (Billboard)	4

=== Year-end charts ===
Year-end chart performance for "Emergence"
Chart (2025)	Position
US Hot Rock & Alternative Songs (Billboard)	23
US Rock & Alternative Airplay (Billboard)	25

== Certifications ==
Certifications for "Emergence"
Region	Certification	Certified units/sales
United Kingdom (BPI)	Silver	200,000^{‡}
United States (RIAA)	Gold	500,000^{‡}
^{‡} Sales+streaming figures based on certification alone.
