= Dangerous (Sleep Token song) =

2025 song by Sleep Token

Song by Sleep Token

from the album Even in Arcadia
- Released: 9 May 2025
- Length: 4:11
- Label: RCA
- Composers: Vessel; II
- Lyricist: Vessel
- Producer: Carl Bown

Visualizer
- "Dangerous" on YouTube

"Dangerous" is a song by anonymous English rock band Sleep Token. It is the fourth out of ten tracks from their fourth studio album, Even in Arcadia, released May 2025.

== Critical reception ==
Susan Hansen of Clash wrote "Suitably, starting in a state of introversion, the electronic ballad-esque 'Dangerous' offers a quietude prior to storm vitality that engages".

Eli Enis of Pitchfork commented that the album's "fleetingly pleasurable moments arrive when Vessel sings mournfully over stormy guitars and pummeling rock drums", mentioning the "explosion" in the song as an example.

In a ranking of the album's songs, Mackenzie Cummings-Grady of Billboard placed "Dangerous" at #10 of 10 , stating that the use of trap and dubstep was "admirable, [but] Even in Arcadia is filled with moments [...] where the guitars are so heavy, and the screams are so dense [...] a dubby bass hit just packs less of a punch." It "feels crowded, with Vessel's voice drowned out by the mash of guitars and beats and backing vocals that perforate the song".

== Personnel ==
Adapted from Qobuz.

- Carl Bown – production, engineering, mixing
- Jim Pinder – engineering
- Adam "Nolly" Getgood – additional production
- Sebastian Sendon – additional engineering, drum editing
- Ste Kerry – mastering

== Charts ==
=== Weekly charts ===
Weekly chart performance for "Dangerous"
Chart (2025)	Peak position
Canada (Canadian Hot 100)	76
Global 200 (Billboard)	129
New Zealand Hot Singles (RMNZ)	3
UK Audio Streaming (Official Charts)	79
UK Rock & Metal (OCC)	23
US Billboard Hot 100	56
US Hot Rock & Alternative Songs (Billboard)	11

=== Year-end charts ===
Year-end chart performance for "Dangerous"
Chart (2025)	Position
US Hot Rock & Alternative Songs (Billboard)	73

== Certifications ==
Certifications for "Dangerous"
Region	Certification	Certified units/sales
United States (RIAA)	Gold	500,000^{‡}
^{‡} Sales+streaming figures based on certification alone.
