= Look to Windward (song) =

2025 song by Sleep Token

Song by Sleep Token

from the album Even in Arcadia
- Released: 9 May 2025
- Length: 7:46
- Label: RCA
- Songwriter: Vessel
- Producer: Carl Bown

Visualizer
- "Look to Windward" on YouTube

"Look to Windward" is a song by anonymous English rock band Sleep Token and the opening track from their fourth studio album, Even in Arcadia, released in May 2025.

== Musical style ==
Maura Johnston of Rolling Stone called the song "a shape-shifting cut that surrounds the vocalist in (at different moments) dial-tone synths, charging strings, trap drums, and commanding piano chords, all of which are eventually steamrolled by heavy guitars and crashing drums".

== Critical reception ==
Mackenzie Cummings-Grady of Billboard ranked the song as the second best from the album, describing it as "a transmuting whirl of an opener. [...] It's a harrowing first impression that pushes back against any expectations one might have when entering Vessel's world".

NME reviewer Rishi Shah said the song "could be an entire album in itself", setting the tone for the rest of the album "with its unbearable, cinematic tension, which is then annihilated by a heaviness that chops through it like an executioner's axe".

== Personnel ==
Adapted from Tidal:

- II – composer
- Carl Bown – production, engineering, mixing
- Jim Pinder – engineering
- Adam "Nolly" Getgood – additional production
- Sebastian Sendon – additional engineering, drum editing
- Ste Kerry – mastering
- Vessel – lyricist, composer

== Charts ==
=== Weekly charts ===
Chart (2025)	Peak position
Canada (Canadian Hot 100)	84
Global 200 (Billboard)	137
New Zealand Hot Singles (RMNZ)	2
UK Singles (OCC)	38
UK Rock & Metal (OCC)	4
US Billboard Hot 100	66
US Hot Rock & Alternative Songs (Billboard)	15

=== Year-end charts ===
Year-end chart performance for "Look to Windward"
Chart (2025)	Position
US Hot Rock & Alternative Songs (Billboard)	98
