= Even in Arcadia =

Studio album by Sleep Token
- Released: 9 May 2025
- Recorded: 2024
- Genres: Alternative metal; pop; R&B; djent; progressive metal
- Length: 56:32
- Label: RCA
- Producer: Carl Bown

Sleep Token chronology
Take Me Back to Eden (2023)	Even in Arcadia (2025)

Singles from Even in Arcadia
- 1. "Emergence" Released: 13 March 2025; 2. "Caramel" Released: 4 April 2025; 3. "Damocles" Released: 25 April 2025

Even in Arcadia is the fourth studio album by the anonymous English rock band Sleep Token. The album was released on 9 May 2025 through RCA Records. The album was produced by Carl Bown and features writing credits from Sleep Token member Vessel. It was promoted by the release of three preceding singles; "Emergence" on 13 March 2025, "Caramel" on 4 April 2025, and "Damocles" on 25 April 2025. In the United Kingdom, the tracks peaked on the Official Charts Company's Official Singles Chart at respective numbers 17, 10, and 25, while on the Billboard Hot 100, they were positioned at numbers 57, 34, and 47. "Emergence" became their first charted track onto either of the two charts, while "Caramel" became their first top-10 entry on the Official Singles Chart.

Even in Arcadia was a commercial success upon release. The album opened with 127,000 first-week sales, making it the band's biggest sales week to date. It debuted atop the Billboard 200 chart, not only becoming their first leader the chart, but also their first top-10 entry. In the United Kingdom, it led on the Official Charts Company's Official Albums Chart. Much of Even in Arcadia's success is due, predominantly, to streaming audience; the album marked the most successful first-week streaming debut of all time for a hard rock album. Even in Arcadia was generally well received by critics, many of which praised Sleep Token's ability to implement differentiating genres and styles to develop "unused genre territory"; in an alternate vein, the album was criticized by some for being "almost offensively boring", and several critics placed it on year-end lists among the worst albums of 2025.

== Concept ==
The title is a partial English translation of the phrase "Et in Arcadia ego", which is "Even in Arcadia, I exist". According to one interpretation, it is believed that this was spoken by Death itself, implying that the threat of death, or misfortune, looms even at the peak of life's successes.

This album marks a new era for the band, having concluded the story of Vessel's relationship with 'Sleep' with Take Me Back to Eden in 2023. (Note: "This new chapter follows Take Me Back To Eden and continues the unfolding journey, where Sleep Token further intertwines the boundaries of sound and emotion, dissolving into something otherworldly".) It is arguably a more personal album, partially unveiling who Vessel is behind the mask. The songs mostly delve into the mental and emotional fallout from attaining international fame, while also touching on identity and relationship issues that may or may not involve 'Sleep'. (Note: Article excerpt: "...a relationship's effect is also explored in 'Dangerous', implying that a relationship can be just that, dangerous. The lyrics of 'Provider' imply a sort of desire to be consumed by the relationship, wanting to be somebody's everything. 'Gethsemane' discusses betrayal in love and fighting not to lose it".)

As part of the album's release, two "houses" were presented with the sentence "Behold, a divide". These were named House Veridian and The Feathered Host. Each had its own coat of arms. House Veridian's was dark green and gold with two crossed swords in the middle, and its slogan was "The House Must Endure". The Feathered Host's was beige and gold with a feather in the middle, and its slogan was "The Cycle Must End". Fans eventually took this to mean that Vessel was at a crossroads in his career – should he continue climbing the ladder of success or end it all?

== Release ==
=== Initial release ===
The release campaign for the album began in February 2025, starting with a series of cryptic social media posts on TikTok, Instagram and other platforms. On 19 February, the band released a TikTok video directing people to a website that teased new music, named showmehowtodanceforever.com. The video marks the first appearance of the black flamingo, the presumed "Feathered Host", that serves as the ambassador to Arcadia. In order to access the site's contents, visitors had to arrange letters on the page in the correct sequence. The sequence of letters turned out to be the Shugborough inscription, which is associated with the painting Et in Arcadia ego ("Shepherds of Arcadia"). Additionally, the website's source coding contained the coordinates of the Shepherd's Monument at Shugborough Hall in Staffordshire, England. Initially, the website allowed users to enter their e-mail address and be randomly assigned to a "house": either 'Arcadia House' or 'Veridian House', later renamed to 'The Feathered Host' and 'House Veridian'. Eventually, the website was updated so that users could "choose their allegiance" to which house they preferred to be a part of.

On 27 February, private Instagram accounts for each house were created, to which untitled piano sheet music was posted. Musicians took to social media to render their own interpretatons of the sheet music. It wasn't until the album was released that the tune was revealed as "Even in Arcadia", the title track of the album. (An instrumental version of this appears on the "Emergence" 7-inch vinyl as well as on the Japanese version of the album as a bonus track.) Hidden messages in cyphers and on the sheet music contained references to a blood moon and the numbers 72, 13, and 3, hinting towards an announcement on 13 March, the 72nd day of the year and the date of a blood moon lunar eclipse.

=== Album, tour, and single announcements ===
In March, there were a few concert venues in the U.S. that temporarily changed their social media profile pictures to either the House Veridian or The Feathered Host designs, hinting that a tour announcement was imminent. On 13 March, Sleep Token simultaneously released their first single, "Emergence", announced the album title and release date of 9 May, and announced their U.S. arena headlining tour with confirmed dates, which was set to commence in September. The website also launched brand new merchandise to celebrate the album, available to pre-order.

Within a week, "Emergence" landed on the Billboard Hot 100 after gaining more than 9.9 million plays in the United States.

The second and third singles, "Caramel" and "Damocles", were also released in April with clues and puzzles for fans to solve. "Caramel" was revealed through a series of posts by American meteorologist Chris Michaels of WRAL-TV, popular for his unique use of rock song lyrics in his weather forecasts. The song debuted at number 34 on the US Billboard Hot 100, becoming the band's highest-charting single to date.

"Damocles" was revealed in a subtler way than "Caramel" was. On the YouTube countdown to the "Caramel" music video premiere, there was a message in binary code that spelled out "Damocles". Additionally, fans noticed randomly capitalized letters in a Billboard interview which also spelled out each letter in "Damocles". (Note: Interview excerpt: "We've got such an amazing plan ahead and so much to Do thAt I think is really going to shake things up and set fans up for an epic experience of Even In Arcadia. This is one of the MOst intelligent and exCited fan bases I've ever seen. They often know what's coming with even the LittleESt kernel of information that's put out there, so I'll keep it to that".) The song reached number 47 on the Billboard Hot 100.

One week before "Damocles" was released, on 18 April, the full album tracklist was announced. The band collaborated with Spotify to create two separate puzzles which were posted to the House Veridian and Feathered Host Instagram accounts. Fans had to unscramble letters and fill in missing ones to figure out each title. House Veridian was assigned tracks 1–5 and The Feathered Host was assigned tracks 6–10, suggesting that those groups of tracks corresponded with each house motto.

== Musical style ==
Musically, Even in Arcadia has been described as alternative metal, djent, pop, R&B, progressive metal, and pop rap, with elements of math rock, emo, arena rock, trip hop, electronic, and reggaeton.

== Reception ==
Professional ratings
Aggregate scores
Source	Rating
AnyDecentMusic?	6.4/10
Metacritic	64/100
Review scores
Source	Rating
The Arts Desk	4/5 stars
AllMusic	4.5/5 stars
Clash	8/10
Dork	4/5
Kerrang!	4/5
NME	5/5 stars
Pitchfork	2.3/10
Rolling Stone	3/5 stars
The Skinny	3/5 stars
Sputnikmusic	1.5/5

=== Critical ===
At Metacritic, which assigns a rating out of 100 to reviews from professional publications, the album received a weighted average score of 64, based on eight reviews, which the website categorised as "generally favorable" reception.

Neil Z. Yeung of AllMusic gave Even in Arcadia a positive review, commending the band for incorporating many different "styles" on the album. He described the track "Caramel" as the album standout, while deeming the album "a streamlined evolution of their established sound". Writing for Clash, Susan Hansen opined that the album "is an absorbing listen" and that the band explores "unused genre territory" on the record. Emma Wilkes of Kerrang! wrote an overall positive review, describing the track "Past Self" as "airy synth-and-drum-machine pop" that "gets a little wobbly", but claiming that the album's "minor quibbles are easily dwarfed by the height of its peaks". Rishi Shah of NME acclaimed the album, opining that it "shatters any pressure of expectation into oblivion, building on the bravery of its predecessor, sonically...".

Conversely, the album was panned by Eli Enis of Pitchfork, who described it as "smooth, flat, edgeless, and utterly lacking in dynamic payoffs, despite its many attempts to swing from breathy ballads to bludgeoning breakdowns", and that "if metal has to reconfigure itself into Benson Boone with a Spirit Halloween gift card in order to reassert its commercial authority, then maybe it's better off toiling away in basements. At least there it can retain its dignity". One staff reviewer from Sputnikmusic was critical of its lyrics and called the band "wholly incompetent songwriters" and that the album itself was "almost offensively boring".

Ben Beaumont-Thomas, music editor of The Guardian, named Even in Arcadia the worst album of the year, believing that "it sounds like Maroon 5 if they had an iron deficiency". Similarly, Paste ranked it as the second-worst album of 2025 out of fifteen listed.

=== Commercial ===
Even in Arcadia became a commercial success, debuting atop the UK Albums Chart. The album debuted at number one on the US Billboard 200 with 127,000 album-equivalent units, including 73,500 pure album sales. The album amassed their first songs to chart on the UK Singles Chart, where the lead single "Emergence" became the band's first top 20 single, peaking at number 17, as well as becoming their first song to enter the US Billboard Hot 100, peaking at number 57. In April, "Caramel" became the band's first single to become a top 10 hit in their home country. In the United States, it became their first top 40 hit, peaking at number 34.

== Accolades ==
At the 68th Annual Grammy Awards, "Emergence" was nominated for "Best Metal Performance" while "Caramel" was nominated for "Best Rock Song".

== Track listing ==
All lyrics are written by Vessel; all music is composed by Vessel and II unless otherwise noted.

Even in Arcadia track listing
No.	Title	Music	Length
1.	"Look to Windward"		7:47
2.	"Emergence"		6:26
3.	"Past Self"	Vessel	3:34
4.	"Dangerous"		4:11
5.	"Caramel"		4:50
6.	"Even in Arcadia"	Vessel	4:28
7.	"Provider"		6:05
8.	"Damocles"		4:25
9.	"Gethsemane"		6:23
10.	"Infinite Baths"		8:24
Total length:			56:32

Japanese bonus tracks
No.	Title	Length
11.	"Emergence" (instrumental)	6:26
12.	"Even in Arcadia" (piano version)	2:50
Total length:		01:05:46

== Personnel ==
Adapted from Qobuz.

- Carl Bown – production, mixing
- Jim Pinder – engineering
- Adam "Nolly" Getgood – additional production
- Sebastian Sendon – additional engineering, drum editing
- Ste Kerry – mastering
- Gabi Rose – saxophone (2)

== Charts ==
=== Weekly charts ===
Weekly chart performance for Even in Arcadia
Chart (2025)	Peak position
Australian Albums (ARIA)	1
Austrian Albums (Ö3 Austria)	1
Belgian Albums (Ultratop Flanders)	1
Belgian Albums (Ultratop Wallonia)	4
Canadian Albums (Billboard)	1
Croatian International Albums (HDU)	32
Danish Albums (Hitlisten)	8
Dutch Albums (Album Top 100)	1
Finnish Albums (Suomen virallinen lista)	5
French Albums (SNEP)	18
French Rock & Metal Albums (SNEP)	2
German Albums (Offizielle Top 100)	1
German Rock & Metal Albums (Offizielle Top 100)	1
Greek Albums (IFPI)	91
Hungarian Albums (MAHASZ)	3
Icelandic Albums (Tónlistinn)	8
Irish Albums (Official Charts)	3
Italian Albums (FIMI)	15
Japanese Albums (Oricon)	46
Japanese Rock Albums (Oricon)	10
Japanese Top Albums Sales (Billboard Japan)	22
Lithuanian Albums (AGATA)	16
New Zealand Albums (RMNZ)	1
Norwegian Albums (VG-lista)	6
Polish Albums (ZPAV)	8
Portuguese Albums (AFP)	4
Scottish Albums (Official Charts)	1
Spanish Albums (Promusicae)	24
Swedish Albums (Sverigetopplistan)	4
Swedish Hard Rock Albums (Sverigetopplistan)	2
Swiss Albums (Schweizer Hitparade)	2
UK Albums (Official Charts)	1
UK Progressive Albums (Official Charts)	1
UK Rock & Metal Albums (Official Charts)	1
US Billboard 200	1
US Top Rock & Alternative Albums (Billboard)	1

Chart performance for Even in Arcadia (Instrumental)
Chart (2026)	Peak position
Australian Albums (ARIA)	40
French Physical Albums (SNEP)	48
French Rock & Metal Albums (SNEP)	22
Scottish Albums (Official Charts)	16
UK Albums Sales (Official Charts)	18
UK Rock & Metal Albums (Official Charts)	3
US Top Album Sales (Billboard)	8

=== Year-end charts ===
Year-end chart performance for Even in Arcadia
Chart (2025)	Position
Australian Albums (ARIA)	19
Austrian Albums (Ö3 Austria)	56
Belgian Albums (Ultratop Flanders)	127
Canadian Top Album Sales (Billboard)	30
German Albums (Offizielle Top 100)	90
New Zealand Albums (RMNZ)	34
UK Albums (OCC)	84
US Billboard 200	143
US Top Rock & Alternative Albums (Billboard)	34

== Certifications ==
Certifications for Even in Arcadia
Region	Certification	Certified units/sales
Australia (ARIA)	Gold	35,000^{‡}
New Zealand (RMNZ)	Gold	7,500^{‡}
United Kingdom (BPI)	Gold	100,000^{‡}
United States (RIAA)	Gold	500,000^{‡}
^{‡} Sales+streaming figures based on certification alone.

== Release history ==
Release history and formats for Even in Arcadia
Region	Date	Format	Label	Ref.
Various	9 May 2025	CD; vinyl; cassette; digital download; streaming	RCA	
Japan	25 June 2025	CD; vinyl; cassette; digital download; streaming	RCA	
