= Damocles (song) =

Single by Sleep Token

from the album Even in Arcadia
- Released: 25 April 2025
- Length: 4:24
- Label: RCA
- Songwriters: Vessel; II
- Producer: Carl Bown

Sleep Token singles chronology
"Caramel" (2025)	"Damocles" (2025)

Visualizer
- "Damocles" on YouTube

"Damocles" is a song by anonymous English rock band Sleep Token from their fourth studio album, Even in Arcadia. It was released on 25 April 2025, written by Vessel and II, and produced by Carl Bown.

== Release ==
"Damocles" was released as the third and final single following "Emergence" and "Caramel". Like the previous singles, it received its own teaser, visualiser video, and album cover art with its own crest.

The teaser depicts the flamingo standing outdoors atop a marble staircase with an ornate fountain in the background. The music video shows a flag with the crest on a stand, burning at the bottom of the staircase. At the end, the video "glitches", showing past or future scenes of battles between multiple beings.

== Concept ==
As per the band:

"The track delves into the quiet unravelling beneath the surface, where grandeur fades and unspoken battles take centre stage. With their signature blend of mystique and vulnerability, "Damocles" captures the weight of unseen struggle and the haunting echo of former glory, inviting listeners to confront what lies beneath the mask."

Similar to "Caramel", Vessel breaks the fourth wall and shares his insecurities regarding his success. He wonders not only when the metaphoric sword of Damocles would fall on him, 'killing' his career, but what will become of him once it does.

=== Music and lyrics ===
"Damocles" derives its title from the story of the Sword of Damocles in ancient Greek mythology. Damocles was a man who wondered what it’d be like to be king for a day. His friend, the king Dionysus II, invited him to attend a banquet. He affixed a sword above Damocles’ head while he ate. Instead of enjoying the banquet, he was distracted by the sword over his head, wondering if and when it would drop. Dionysus II explained later on that that the uneasiness that Damocles felt during the evening was the way he felt every day as a king.

Taking this into account, the lyrics portray Vessel as a modern-day Damocles: achieving fame and success in the music industry, but constantly dreading when he might fade into irrelevance instead of revelling in the highs of the moment.

The song incorporates piano elements, being described as softer and lighter than previous works, as well as being labeled as a ballad. It later progresses into a heavier and more modern sound.

== Reception ==
=== Critical ===
Reviewers have described the lyrics as "honest" and "vulnerable", though "sombre" and "melancholic." Spencer Kaufman of Consequence appreciated the "mellow" instrumentation and letting "Vessel's vocals shine through."

=== Commercial ===
Upon release, "Damocles" debuted at its peak position of number 25 on the OCC UK Singles chart, while the song topped the UK Rock & Metal Singles. On the ARIA Top 20 New Music Singles chart, the song peaked at number 14, and on the IRMA Ireland Singles chart, the song reached number 92. The song reached number 38 on the RMNZ New Zealand Top 40 chart.

== Personnel ==
Adapted from Tidal.

- II – composer
- Adam "Nolly" Getgood – additional producer
- Carl Bown – producer, mixing, engineer
- Sebastion Sendon – drum editing, additional engineering
- Sta Kerry – masterer, engineer
- Vessel – composer, writer

== Charts ==
=== Weekly charts ===
Weekly chart performance for "Damocles"
Chart (2025)	Peak position
Australia (ARIA)	54
Canada (Canadian Hot 100)	69
Global 200 (Billboard)	83
Ireland (IRMA)	92
New Zealand (Recorded Music NZ)	38
UK Singles (OCC)	25
UK Rock & Metal (OCC)	1
US Billboard Hot 100	47
US Hot Rock & Alternative Songs (Billboard)	11

=== Year-end charts ===
Year-end chart performance for "Damocles"
Chart (2025)	Position
US Hot Rock & Alternative Songs (Billboard)	43

== Certifications ==
Certifications for "Damocles"
Region	Certification	Certified units/sales
United States (RIAA)	Gold	500,000^{‡}
^{‡} Sales+streaming figures based on certification alone.
