= Even in Arcadia (song) =

2025 song by Sleep Token

Song by Sleep Token

from the album Even in Arcadia
- Released: 9 May 2025
- Length: 4:28
- Label: RCA
- Songwriter: Vessel
- Producer: Carl Bown

Visualizer
- "Even in Arcadia" on YouTube

"Even in Arcadia" is a song by anonymous English rock band Sleep Token. It shares a title with their album of the same name, and is the sixth track of ten total on the album, released in May 2025.

== Critical reception ==
Rishi Shah of NME described the song as "straight out of the Game of Thrones score, carrying the hallmarks of some sort of critical judgement day for Vessel. We hear him momentarily roar for the first time, perhaps finally owning the image of the deity he's been built up to be". Reviewing Even in Arcadia for Rolling Stone, Maura Johnston commented that Vessel's voice "is a sturdy burr that flutters with intensity on cuts like the windswept title track".

Mackenzie Cummings-Grady of Billboard ranked it as the seventh best song from the album, stating "'Even in Arcadia' is spellbinding. Guided by nothing more than a piano and Vessel's voice, the song serves as both a nice break from the upbeat anthems that came before it, and a haunting call to arms for Sleep Token's longtime supporters, thanking them for taking this strange journey into the mainstream eye with them".

== Personnel ==
Adapted from Tidal.

- Carl Bown – production, engineering, mixing
- Jim Pinder – engineering
- Adam "Nolly" Getgood – additional production
- Sebastian Sendon – additional engineering, drum editing
- Ste Kerry – mastering

== Charts ==
=== Weekly charts ===
Weekly chart performance for "Even in Arcadia"
| Chart (2025) | Peak position |
|---|---|
| Canada (Canadian Hot 100) | 80 |
| Global 200 (Billboard) | 123 |
| New Zealand Hot Singles (RMNZ) | 1 |
| Sweden Heatseeker (Sverigetopplistan) | 13 |
| UK Singles (Official Charts) | 31 |
| UK Rock & Metal (Official Charts) | 2 |
| US Billboard Hot 100 | 61 |
| US Hot Rock & Alternative Songs (Billboard) | 14 |

=== Year-end charts ===
Year-end chart performance for "Even in Arcadia"
| Chart (2025) | Position |
|---|---|
| US Hot Rock & Alternative Songs (Billboard) | 100 |
