= Take Me Back to Eden =

Studio album by Sleep Token
- Released: 19 May 2023
- Studio: Treehouse Studios (Chesterfield)
- Genres: Alternative metal; progressive metal; djent; pop; R&B
- Length: 63:26
- Label: Spinefarm
- Producers: Vessel; Carl Bown

Sleep Token chronology
This Place Will Become Your Tomb (2021)	Take Me Back to Eden (2023)	Even in Arcadia (2025)

Singles from Take Me Back to Eden
- 1. "Chokehold" Released: 5 January 2023; 2. "The Summoning" Released: 6 January 2023; 3. "Granite" Released: 19 January 2023; 4. "Aqua Regia" Released: 20 January 2023; 5. "Vore" Released: 16 February 2023; 6. "DYWTYLM" Released: 20 April 2023

Take Me Back to Eden is the third studio album by the anonymous English rock band Sleep Token. It was recorded at Treehouse Studios and released by Spinefarm Records on 19 May 2023. It is the first album produced by Carl Bown rather than by George Lever.

While initial reviews were mixed, the album eventually received numerous accolades and featured on several well-known best of 2023 lists. It became a commercial hit and was Spotify's most streamed metal album of 2023.

== Concept ==
Take Me Back to Eden was described as "Part 3 of a trilogy, a spectacular chapter-closer in the ongoing Sleep Token saga, a saga that kicked off in earnest with debut album Sundowning".

== Release and promotion ==
"Chokehold" and "The Summoning" were the first two singles, released on 5 and 6 January 2023 respectively. These were followed by "Granite" on 19 January and "Aqua Regia" on 20 January.

The quick succession of releases led to a rapid increase in popularity for the band, who grew from having reportedly "less than 300,000 monthly listeners on Spotify at the beginning of January" to having over 1.58 million by the end of the month. "Vore" was announced as the fifth single on 16 February, the same day the official album title and release date were revealed. "DYWTYLM" was issued as the sixth pre-release track from the album on 23 April 2023.

== Musical style ==
The album combines elements of various genres including funk, electronic, pop, R&B, alternative metal, progressive metal, djent, metalcore, and blues.

== Reception ==
Professional ratings
Aggregate scores
Source	Rating
Metacritic	60/100
Review scores
Source	Rating
Blabbermouth.net	8/10
Clash	5/10
Kerrang!	4/5
The Line of Best Fit	6/10
Metal Hammer	4/5 stars
Metal Injection	6.5/10
MetalSucks	4.5/5
NME	5/5 stars
The Skinny	4/5 stars
Wall of Sound	10/10

=== Critical ===
Take Me Back to Eden received polarized reviews from music critics. On Metacritic, which assigns a normalised rating out of 100 to reviews from professional publications, the album received an average score of 60, based on seven reviews, indicating "mixed or average reviews".

In a five-star review for NME, Emma Wilkes described the album as "an ambitious, emotional monolith of a record, with all the hallmarks of future classic status", praising its "unpredictability" and adoption of multiple musical styles. In a four-star review for Metal Hammer, Dannii Leivers described Take Me Back to Eden as "a record that not only expands the band's universe and continues to prod metal's boundaries, but considers what it means to be human", proposing that it is "Sleep Token's strongest effort to date".

Clash writer Ims Taylor claimed that "Some moments are impressive", [but it's] "an album let down by over-indulgence", suggesting that the record features too many songs that "stretch on longer than [they] need to". Similarly, Elliott Burr of The Line of Best Fit thought that Take Me Back to Eden "tends to drag along with bread-and-butter formulas", concluding his 6/10 review with: "[it] may not be revolutionary in its music or pantomime...".

=== Commercial ===
Take Me Back to Eden debuted number 3 in the UK and number 16 on the US Billboard 200. The second single "The Summoning" was the band's first song to register on the official UK and US charts, reaching number 14 on the UK Rock & Metal Singles Chart, number 26 on the Billboard Hot Rock & Alternative Songs chart, and number two on the Billboard Hard Rock Digital Song Sales chart.

"The Summoning" also reached number 1 on the Spotify Top 50 Viral Songs chart and received over one million views on YouTube within two weeks.

== Accolades ==
=== 2023 ===
At the end of 2023, Take Me Back to Eden was included in a number of music publication's end-of-year lists:

Publication	List	Rank	Ref.
Alternative Press	5 Best Albums of 2023 (Readers' Vote)	#5	
Alternative Press	50 Best Albums of 2023 (Writers' Vote)	unordered	
Kerrang!	50 Best Albums of 2023	#3	
Metal Hammer	50 Best Metal Albums of 2023 (Readers' Vote)	#1	
Metal Hammer	50 Best Metal Albums of 2023 (Writers' Vote)	#4	
Metal Injection	Top 20 Albums of 2023	#5	
NME	Best Albums of 2023	#21	
Revolver	5 Best Albums of 2023 (Readers' Vote)	#1	
Revolver	30 Best Albums of 2023 (Writers' Vote)	#1	
Rock Sound	Top 50 Albums of 2023	#1	

=== 2024–present ===
On 22 August 2024, Take Me Back to Eden won the Heavy Music Award for Best Album of the Year.

On 12 December 2024, Take Me Back to Eden won the Billboard Music Award for Best Hard Rock Album.

In March 2026, Metal Hammer ranked 'TMBTE' as the fourth best metal album of the decade "so far." The magazine believes that this album helped the band "[pave] the way for a new school of metal."

== Track listing ==
All tracks are written by Vessel and II unless otherwise noted.

Take Me Back to Eden track listing
No.	Title	Writer(s)	Length
1.	"Chokehold"		5:04
2.	"The Summoning"		6:35
3.	"Granite"		3:45
4.	"Aqua Regia"		3:56
5.	"Vore"		5:39
6.	"Ascensionism"		7:08
7.	"Are You Really Okay?"		5:06
8.	"The Apparition"		4:28
9.	"DYWTYLM (Note: Initialism stands for "Do You Wish That You Loved Me")"	Vessel	4:00
10.	"Rain"		4:12
11.	"Take Me Back to Eden"		8:20
12.	"Euclid"		5:13
Total length:			63:26

== Personnel ==
- Vessel – vocals, guitar, bass, keyboards, synthesizers, production
- II – drums
- Carl Bown – production, engineering
- Ste Kerry – mastering

== Charts ==
=== Weekly charts ===
Weekly chart performance for Take Me Back to Eden
Chart (2023–25)	Peak position
Australian Albums (ARIA)	3
Austrian Albums (Ö3 Austria)	12
Belgian Albums (Ultratop Flanders)	47
Belgian Albums (Ultratop Wallonia)	84
Canadian Albums (Billboard)	69
Dutch Albums (Album Top 100)	36
Finnish Albums (Suomen virallinen lista)	37
French Albums (SNEP)	133
German Albums (Offizielle Top 100)	5
New Zealand Albums (RMNZ)	12
Polish Albums (ZPAV)	92
Portuguese Albums (AFP)	185
Scottish Albums (Official Charts)	4
Swiss Albums (Schweizer Hitparade)	24
UK Albums (Official Charts)	3
UK Rock & Metal Albums (Official Charts)	2
US Billboard 200	16
US Independent Albums (Billboard)	4
US Top Alternative Albums (Billboard)	2
US Top Hard Rock Albums (Billboard)	2
US Top Rock Albums (Billboard)	4

=== Year-end charts ===
Year-end chart performance for Take Me Back to Eden
Chart (2023)	Position
UK Cassette Albums (OCC)	7
US Top Alternative Albums (Billboard)	44
US Top Hard Rock Albums (Billboard)	23

Chart (2024)	Position
US Top Hard Rock Albums (Billboard)	13

== Certifications ==
Certifications for Take Me Back to Eden
Region	Certification	Certified units/sales
New Zealand (RMNZ)	Gold	7,500^{‡}
United Kingdom (BPI)	Gold	132,796
United States (RIAA)	Platinum	1,000,000^{‡}
^{‡} Sales+streaming figures based on certification alone.
