= Arcadia (utopia) =

Utopian ideal

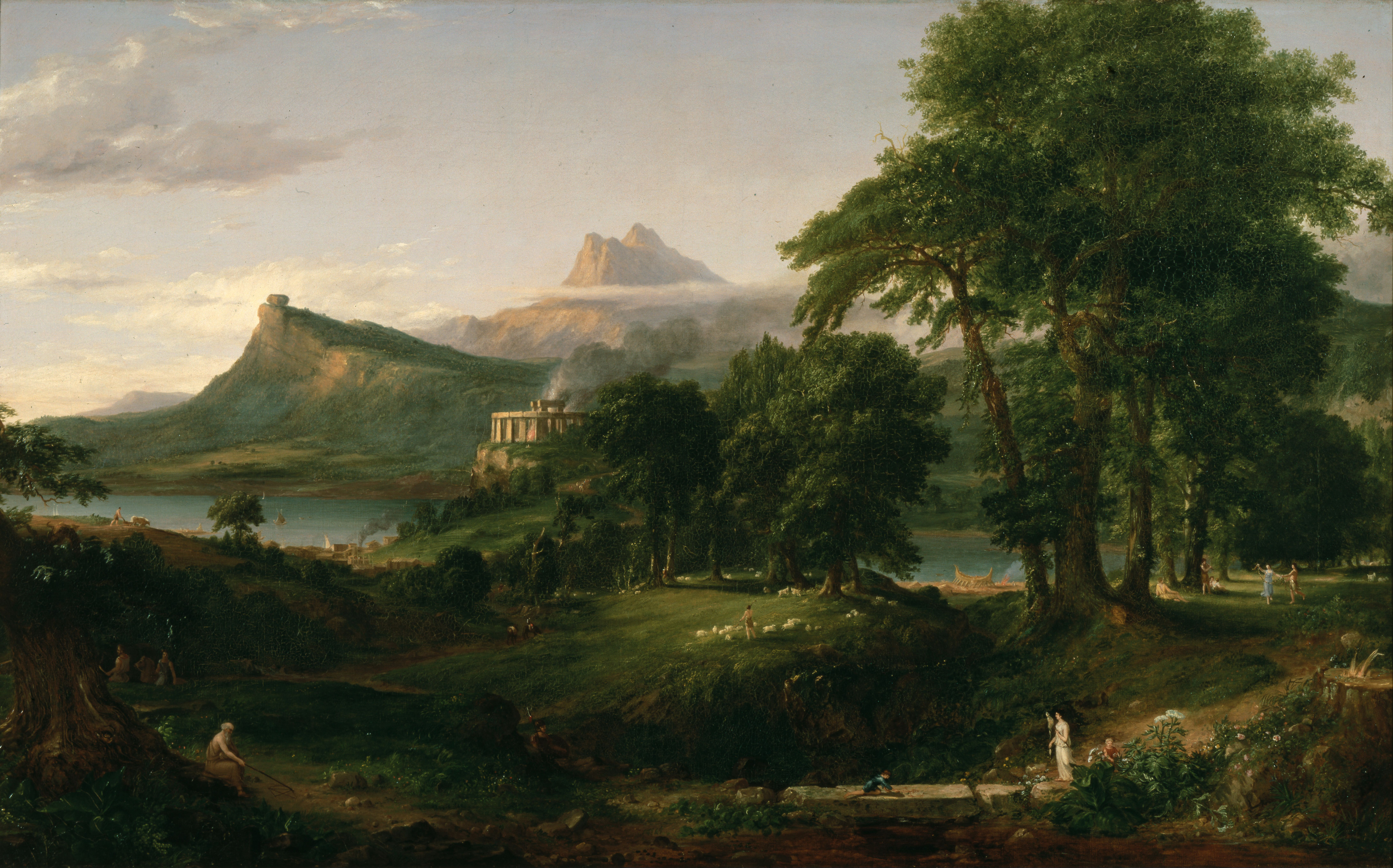
Thomas Cole's The Arcadian or Pastoral State, 1834

Arcadia (/ɑːrˈkeɪdiə/ ar-KAY-dee-ə; Greek: Ἀρκαδία, romanized: Arkadía) is an idyllic conception of the pastoral in harmony with nature. The term is derived from the Greek province of the same name which dates to antiquity; the province's mountainous topography and sparse population of pastoralists later caused the word Arcadia to develop into a poetic byword for a utopian vision of unspoiled wilderness.

Arcadia is a poetic term associated with bountiful natural splendor and harmony. The 'Garden' is often inhabited by shepherds. The concept also figures in Renaissance mythology. Although commonly thought of as being in line with Utopian ideals, Arcadia differs from that tradition in that it is more often specifically regarded as unattainable. Furthermore, it is seen as a lost, Edenic form of life, contrasting to the progressive nature of Utopian desires.

The inhabitants were often regarded as having continued to live after the manner of the Golden Age, without the pride and avarice that corrupted other regions. It is also sometimes referred to in English poetry as Arcady (/ˈɑːrkədi/ AR-kə-dee). The inhabitants of this region bear an obvious connection to the figure of the noble savage, both being regarded as living close to nature, uncorrupted by civilization, and virtuous.

== In antiquity ==
According to Greek mythology, Arcadia of Peloponnesus was the domain of Pan, a virgin wilderness home to the god of the forest and his court of dryads, nymphs and other spirits of nature. It was one version of paradise, though only in the sense of being the abode of supernatural entities, not an afterlife for deceased mortals.

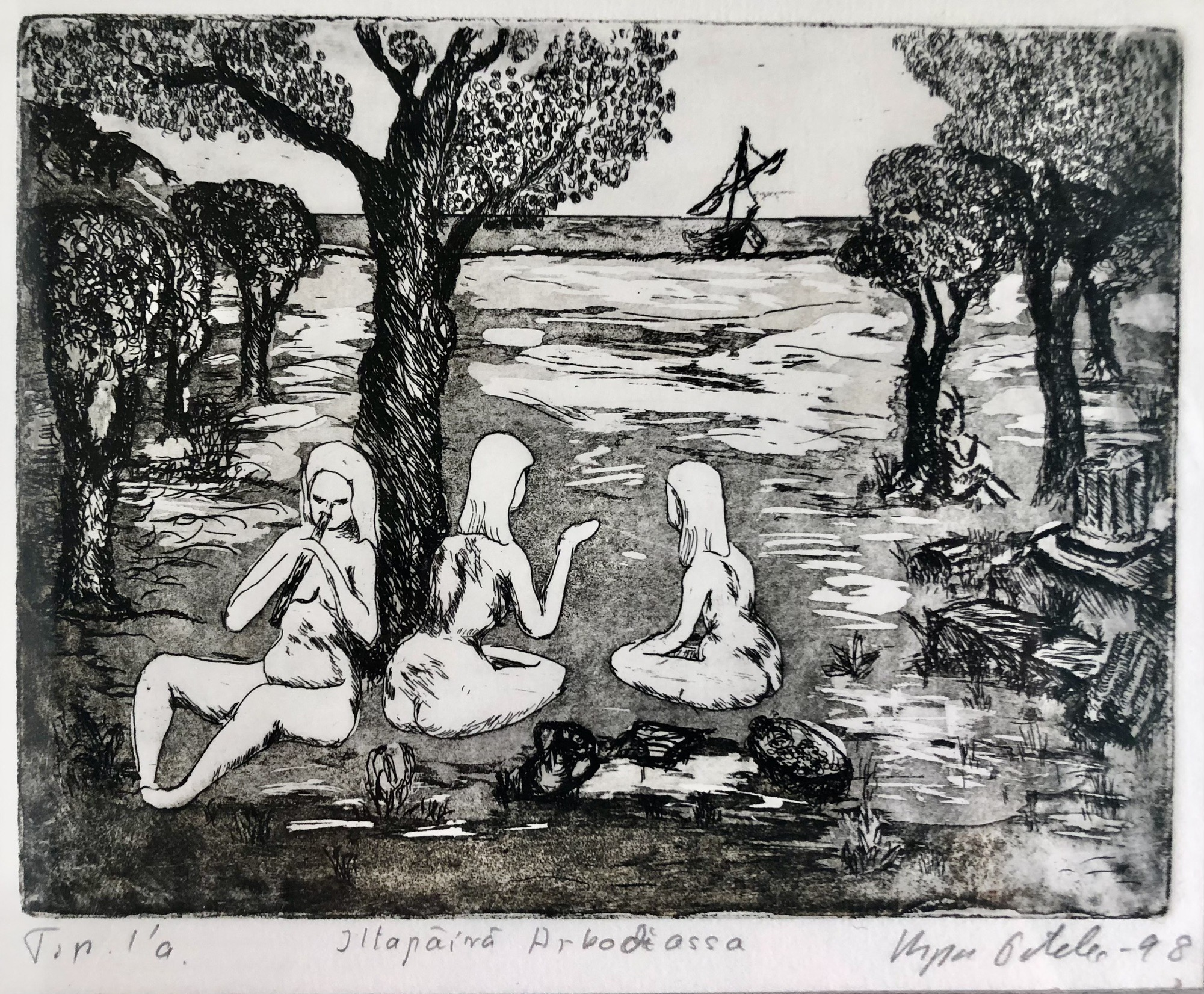
Urpo Tikka's etching Afternoon at Arcadia, 1995

In the 3rd century BCE the Greek poet Theocritus wrote idealised views of the lives of peasants in Arcadia for his fellow educated inhabitants of the squalid and disease-ridden city of Alexandria.

Greek mythology and the poetry of Theocritus inspired the Roman poet Virgil to write his Eclogues, a series of poems with references to Arcadia as the home of Pan, pipes and singing.

== In the Renaissance ==
Arcadia has remained a popular artistic subject since antiquity, both in visual arts and literature. As Renaissance artists turned to classical antiquity for inspiration, artistic references to Arcadia underwent a revival. Images of beautiful nymphs frolicking in lush forests have been a frequent source of inspiration for painters and sculptors. Because of the influence of Virgil in medieval European literature, e. g. in Divine Comedy, Arcadia became a symbol of pastoral simplicity. European Renaissance writers (for instance, the Spanish poet Garcilaso de la Vega) often revisited the theme, and the name came to apply to any idyllic location or paradise.

Of particular note is Et in Arcadia Ego by Nicolas Poussin. In 1502 Jacopo Sannazaro published his long poem Arcadia that fixed the Early Modern perception of Arcadia as a lost world of idyllic bliss, remembered in regretful dirges.

In the 1580s Sir Philip Sidney circulated copies of his influential prose romance The Countess of Pembroke's Arcadia, which established Arcadia as an icon of the Renaissance; although the story is plentifully supplied with shepherds and other pastoral characters, the primary characters are all royal visitors of the countryside. In 1598 the Spanish playwright and poet Lope de Vega published Arcadia: Prose and Verse, which was a bestseller at the time.

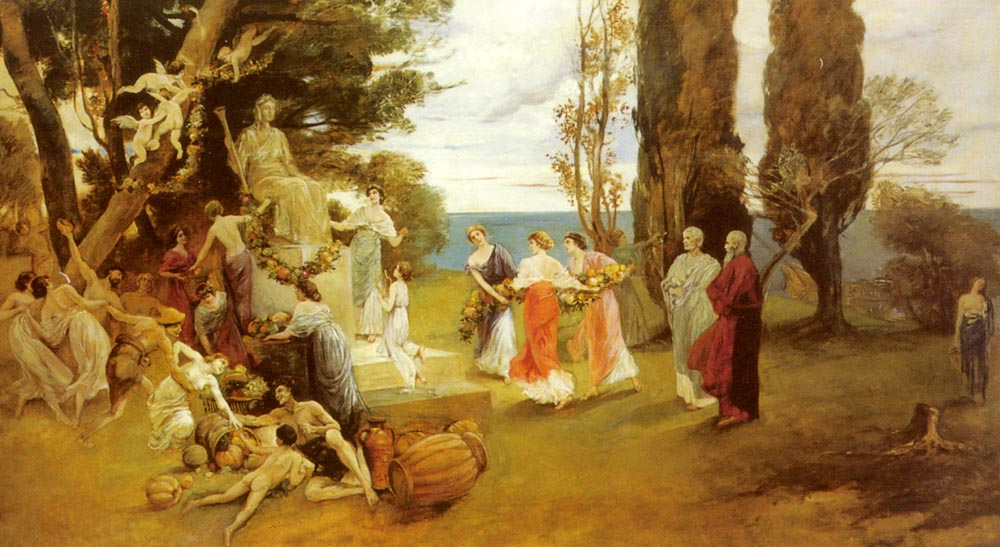
Friedrich August von Kaulbach's In Arcadia

Though depicted as contemporary, this pastoral form is often connected with the Golden Age. It may be suggested that its inhabitants have merely continued to live as persons did in the Golden Age, and all other nations have less pleasant lives because they have allowed themselves to depart from original simplicity.

=== Acadia ===
The 16th-century Italian explorer Giovanni da Verrazzano applied the name "Arcadia" to the entire North American Atlantic coast north of Virginia. In time, this mutated to Acadia. The Dictionary of Canadian Biography says: "Arcadia, the name Verrazzano gave to Maryland or Virginia 'on account of the beauty of the trees', made its first cartographical appearance in the 1548 Gastaldo map and is the only name on that map to survive in Canadian usage. . . . In the 17th century Champlain fixed its present orthography, with the 'r' omitted, and Ganong has shown its gradual progress northwards, in a succession of maps, to its resting place in the Atlantic Provinces".

Revival of Mi'kmaq language has provided strong reason to believe that Verrazzano was informed by the name the Mi'kmaq gave to this place. The name Acadie may be derived from the Mi'kmaq, because in their language the word "cadie" means "place of abundance" and can be found in names such as "Tracadie" and "Shubenacadie".

== In 19th-century art ==
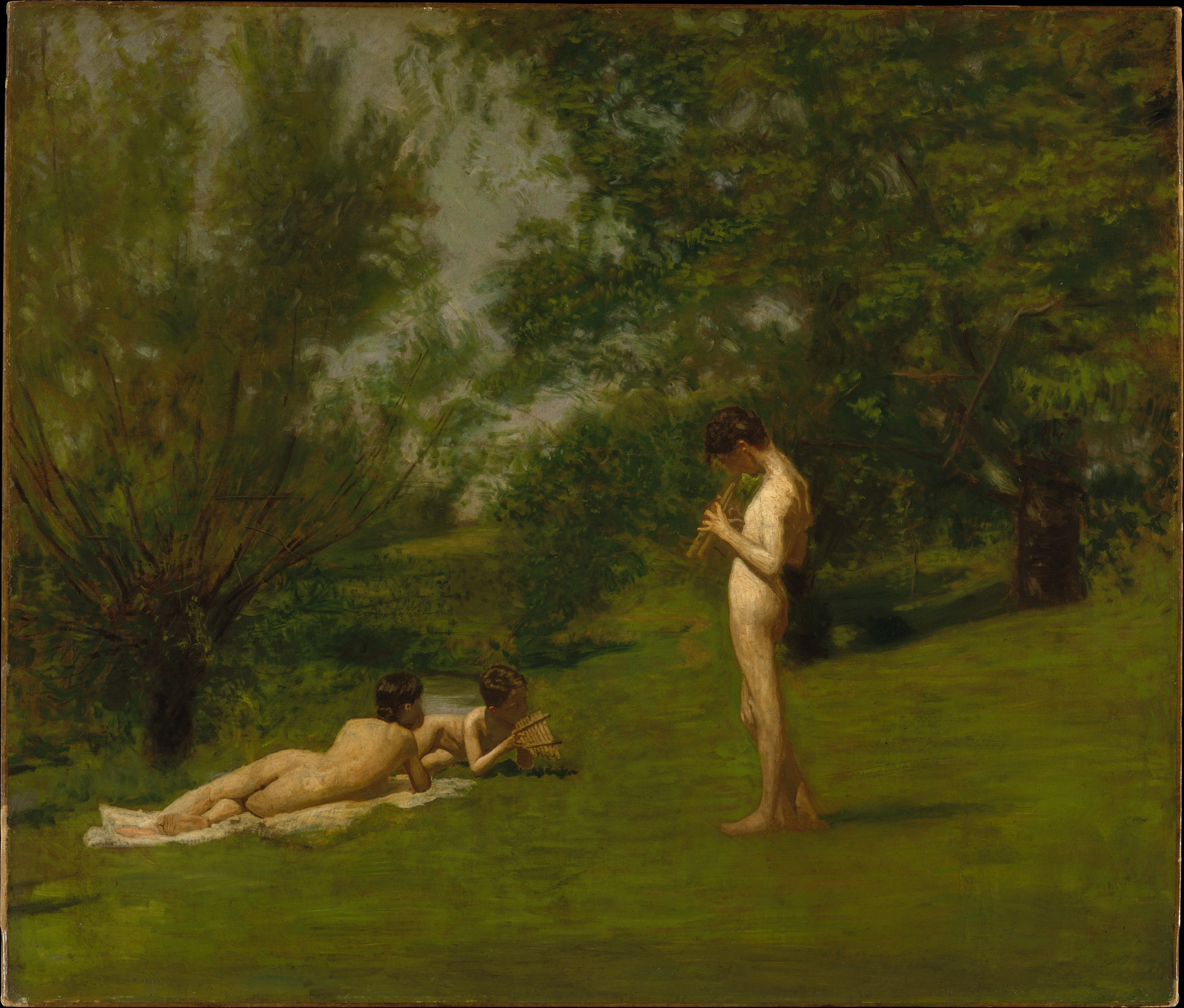
Thomas Eakins's Arcadia

In 1848, Judge Samuel Treat, of St. Louis described life of the early settlers in the Midwest with the sentence "Each family produced whatever was necessary for its own consumption, and lived in almost Arcadian simplicity."

Composer W. S. Gilbert used the concept of Arcadia in his musicals Happy Arcadia (1872) and Iolanthe (1882).

Around 1880, the German painter Wilhelm von Kaulbach produced an etching, named Faust und Helena in Arkadien. Faust and Helena are shown in the Arcadian grove, at the place of cheerful poetry, where they produced a son, Euphorion. He represent the spirit of antiquity married to the Nordic-German spirit, as an allegory of German-Greek poetry.

The American painter Thomas Eakins produced a series of Arcadian works in the 1880s: His painting In Arcadia, which was an "unusual venture into mythology, tackled using the most modern of methods: the camera" and a relief with nearly 20 sculptures, paintings and photographs connected with it. The atmosphere of the relief has been described as "vespertinal mixture of sadness and tranquility", a "sylvan realm far removed from the realities in 1883 Philadelphia".

The New York critic Mark Stevens wrote: "His [Eakins] joy in the natural body rarely made its way into his major paintings, perhaps because the subject was so personally complex for him. Only in his great "Swimming", which shows naked young men at a swimming hole, did he create an American Arcadia." Eakins' student Thomas Pollock Anshutz (1851–1912) had a long preoccupation painting "Arcadian subjects".

== In popular culture ==
One of the most popular Edwardian musical comedies is The Arcadians (1909).

=== Pastoral science fiction ===
Pastoral science fiction is a subgenre of science fiction which uses bucolic, rural settings, like other forms of pastoral literature. Since it is a subgenre of science fiction, authors may set stories either on Earth or another habitable planet or moon, sometimes including a terraformed planet or moon. Unlike most genres of science fiction, pastoral science fiction works downplay the role of futuristic technologies. The pioneer is author Clifford Simak (1904–1988), a science fiction Grand Master whose output included stories written in the 1950s and 1960s about rural people who have contact with extraterrestrial beings who hide their alien identity.

Pastoral science fiction stories typically show a reverence for the land, its life-giving food harvests, the cycle of the seasons, and the role of the community. While fertile agrarian environments on Earth or Earth-like planets are common settings, some works may be set in ocean or desert planets or habitable moons. The rural dwellers, such as farmers and small-townspeople, are depicted sympathetically, albeit with the tendency to portray them as conservative and suspicious of change. The simple, peaceful rural life is often contrasted with the negative aspects of noisy, dirty, fast-paced cities. Some works take a Luddite tone, criticizing mechanization and industrialization and showing the ills of urbanization and over-reliance on advanced technologies.

== See also ==
- Acadia
- Arcadia (region of Greece)
- Et in Arcadia ego (Guercino), painting by Italian artist Giovanni Francesco Barbieri
- Garden of Eden
- Locus amoenus
- Millennialism
- Neverland
- Olam Haba
- Otherworld
