= Sleep Token =

English rock band

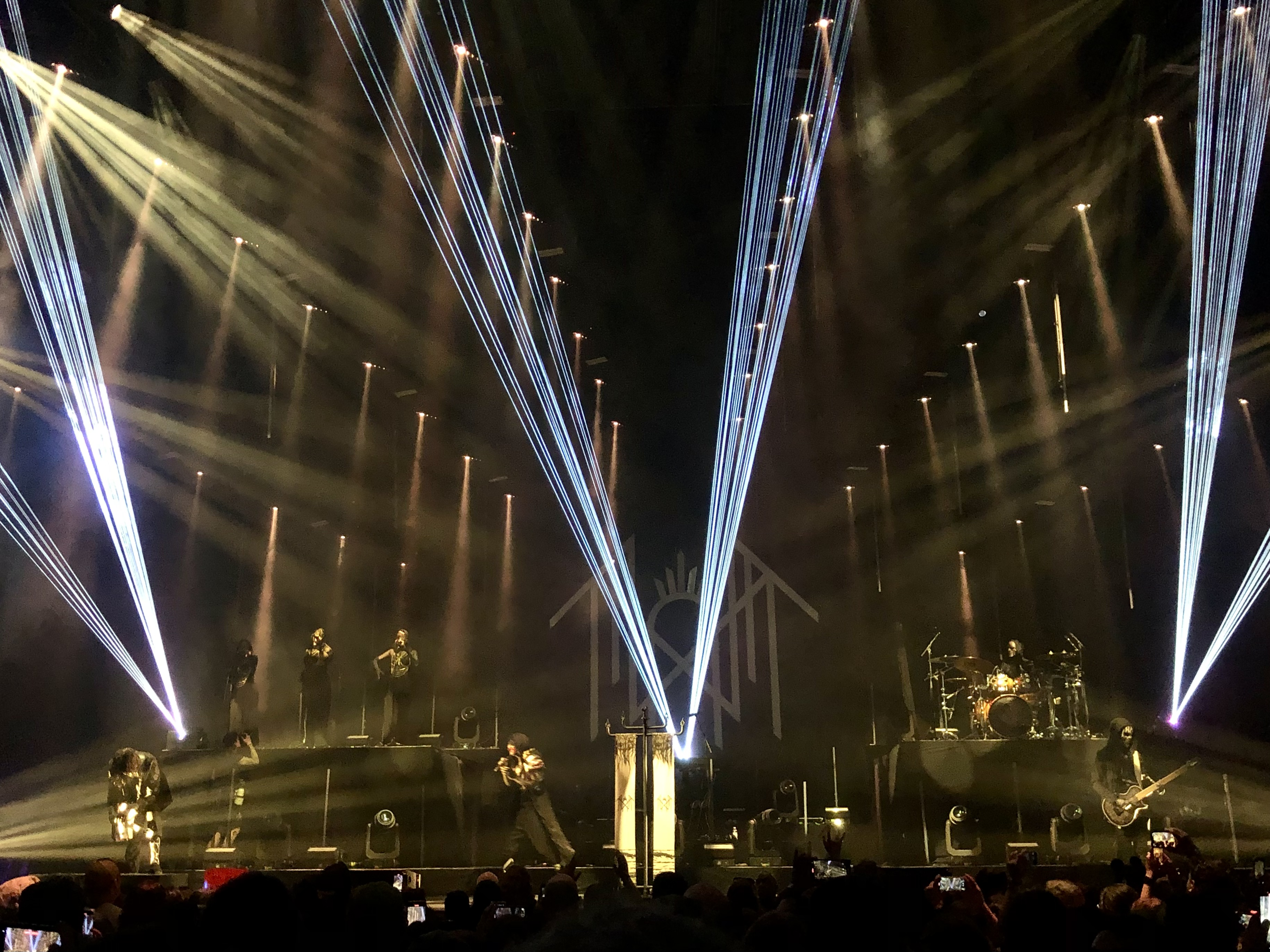
- Sleep Token performing with Espera in 2024

Background information
- Origin: London, England
- Genres: Alternative metal; indie pop; progressive metal; post-metal; djent
- Works: Discography
- Years active: 2016–present
- Labels: Spinefarm; Basick; RCA
- Members: Vessel; II
- Website: sleep-token.com
- Logo

Sleep Token are an anonymous English rock band formed in London in 2016. They have released four studio albums, two EPs, two standalone songs, and multiple covers.

The band consists of two main members, only known as Vessel and II. Live, they are joined by five touring musicians: bassist III, guitarist IV, and a trio of backing vocalists known as Espera. The members have never revealed their real names or identities. On stage, they conceal themselves with masks, long robes, and black body paint.

After self-releasing their debut EP, One, in 2016, the band signed with Basick Records and issued a follow-up EP, Two, the next year. The group signed with Spinefarm Records and released their first full-length album (LP), Sundowning, in 2019, which was followed in 2021 by This Place Will Become Your Tomb. A third album, Take Me Back to Eden, was released in 2023. Their fourth album, Even in Arcadia, was released in 2025 through RCA Records.

== History ==
=== One, Two and other early releases (2016–2019) ===
Their first single, "Thread the Needle", was released in September 2016, which was later revealed to be a part of their self-released debut EP One in December. The EP featured two additional songs plus alternative piano arrangements of all three tracks.

On 28 February 2017 they released a cover of Outkast's "Hey Ya!" on YouTube.

In May 2017, it was announced that Sleep Token had signed with independent label Basick Records and would release their second EP Two in July. Ahead of the EP's release, the group issued two new singles – "Calcutta" in May and "Nazareth" in June. "Calcutta" received an exclusive premiere through Metal Hammer, where writer Luke Morton described the song as "an odd and unique mix of technical metal and expansive indie soundscapes".

Two was positively reviewed by Distorted Sound's Matt Corcoran, who noted the combination of elements from multiple genres: "Across these three spellbinding tracks the band fully delivers on their genre-blending promise, moving between light indie atmospherics and dark, Meshuggah-esque heaviness and covering most of the spectrum in between".

Besides releasing music, Sleep Token also began performing live in 2017 as support for larger acts. Their earliest-known performances were at O2 Academy Islington supporting Norwegian band Motorpsycho in October and at Student Central supporting French synthwave artist Perturbator in November.

2018 saw Sleep Token focus more on their live shows than releasing music. Only two standalone singles were released that year - "Jaws" in June and "The Way That You Were" in October. Both singles were later issued together on 10" vinyl for Record Store Day in 2021.

In March, Sleep Token was nominated for 'Best New Artist' at the Metal Hammer Golden Gods Awards, "honouring the young artists who have set the metal scene alight over the past 12 months."

Early on in the year, they were a supporting act for Loathe and Holding Absence. In April they performed at Maida Vale Studios for the BBC Radio 1 Rock Show with Daniel P. Carter. In June they played at Camden Rocks Festival.

Sleep Token announced their inaugural headline show on 28 August 2018. It was their eleventh show overall, which was held at St Pancras Old Church on 11 October.

=== Sundowning (2019–2020) ===
In June 2019, Sleep Token signed with their first major label: UMG subsidiary Spinefarm Records. It was also announced that their debut full-length album, Sundowning, was confirmed for a November release, with "The Night Does Not Belong to God" released as the first single. The group continued issuing songs from the album every two weeks up to the album release date. Sundowning received generally positive reviews from music critics. Kerrang! columnist Tom Shepherd gave the album a rating of four out of five, writing that it contains "moments here to truly savour, and ideas and experiences that feel unique", but noting that "the continuous nature of this dark mood entwined with the group's slow-burning, listless pace does begin to drag across [its] 50-minute runtime".

Prior to the album's release, Sleep Token played two sold-out shows in London and Manchester. After its release, they embarked on their first North American tour supporting metalcore group Issues, alongside progressive rock band Polyphia and rapper Lil Aaron.

Sleep Token were nominated for 'Best UK Breakthrough Band' by the Heavy Music Awards in 2019.

After a short UK tour at the beginning of 2020, several shows were cancelled due to the COVID-19 pandemic. These included planned appearances at Knotfest Japan in March, Download Festival in June, and Madrid's Mad Cool in July. During the summer, the band released an expanded version of Sundowning with four new piano-based tracks collectively known as The Room Below. This release included cover versions of Billie Eilish's "When the Party's Over" and Whitney Houston's "I Wanna Dance with Somebody (Who Loves Me)".

Sundowning received a 'Best Album' nomination by the Heavy Music Awards in 2020.

=== This Place Will Become Your Tomb (2021–2022) ===
The group planned to return to live performing in March 2021 with five socially-distanced shows called "The Isolation Rituals", however these were ultimately cancelled due to ongoing pandemic-related concerns. They eventually returned in the summer headlining the second stage at the Download Festival Pilot on 18 June. The day before, the band announced their second album This Place Will Become Your Tomb and released a new single, "Alkaline". "Alkaline" was followed by "The Love You Want" and "Fall for Me" in August and September.

This Place Will Become Your Tomb was released on 24 September 2021 and was promoted on an eight-date headline tour of the UK and Ireland in November, with support from A.A. Williams. The album earned Sleep Token their first chart positions when it debuted at number 39 on the UK Albums Chart and number 13 on the Scottish Albums Chart.

In January 2022, Sleep Token were featured as a cover artist for Metal Hammer magazine. More shows followed in the spring and summer. In April, frontman Vessel performed an "intimate" solo show (joined by only three backing vocalists) dubbed A Ritual from the Room Below. In May, the group supported Architects alongside Malevolence on a short tour of the UK. During the summer months, they play several festivals, including Download, and toured with Northlane in Australia. Later dates followed in North America supporting In This Moment with Nothing More and Cherry Bombs.

Sleep Token were nominated for both 'Best UK Artist' and 'Best Live Artist' by the Heavy Music Awards in 2022.

=== Take Me Back to Eden (2023–2024) ===
Towards the end of 2022, Sleep Token announced a UK headline tour for January 2023 supported by Northlane, as well as an Australian tour for April/May. The band attracted significant international attention when video footage of their 29 April 2023 performance of "Atlantic" in Sydney, Australia went viral due to an audience member's audible fart.

Ahead of a string of shows in Germany, the band released the single "Chokehold", their first new material since This Place Will Become Your Tomb, on 5 January 2023. This was followed by "The Summoning" the next day, "Granite" two weeks later, and "Aqua Regia" the day after. All four tracks were included on the band's third album, Take Me Back to Eden, which was released in May. Take Me Back to Eden marked a significant change in the band's creative process, as they stopped working with their long-time producer George Lever in favour of Carl Bown. Vessel also took on a co-producer role with Bown for the first time in the band's career.

The month of May also saw the band win 'Best UK Artist' at the 2023 Heavy Music Awards. The band were also booked to perform at that year's summer festivals, including Graspop Metal Meeting in Belgium, Wacken Open Air in Germany, and Reading and Leeds Festivals in the UK.

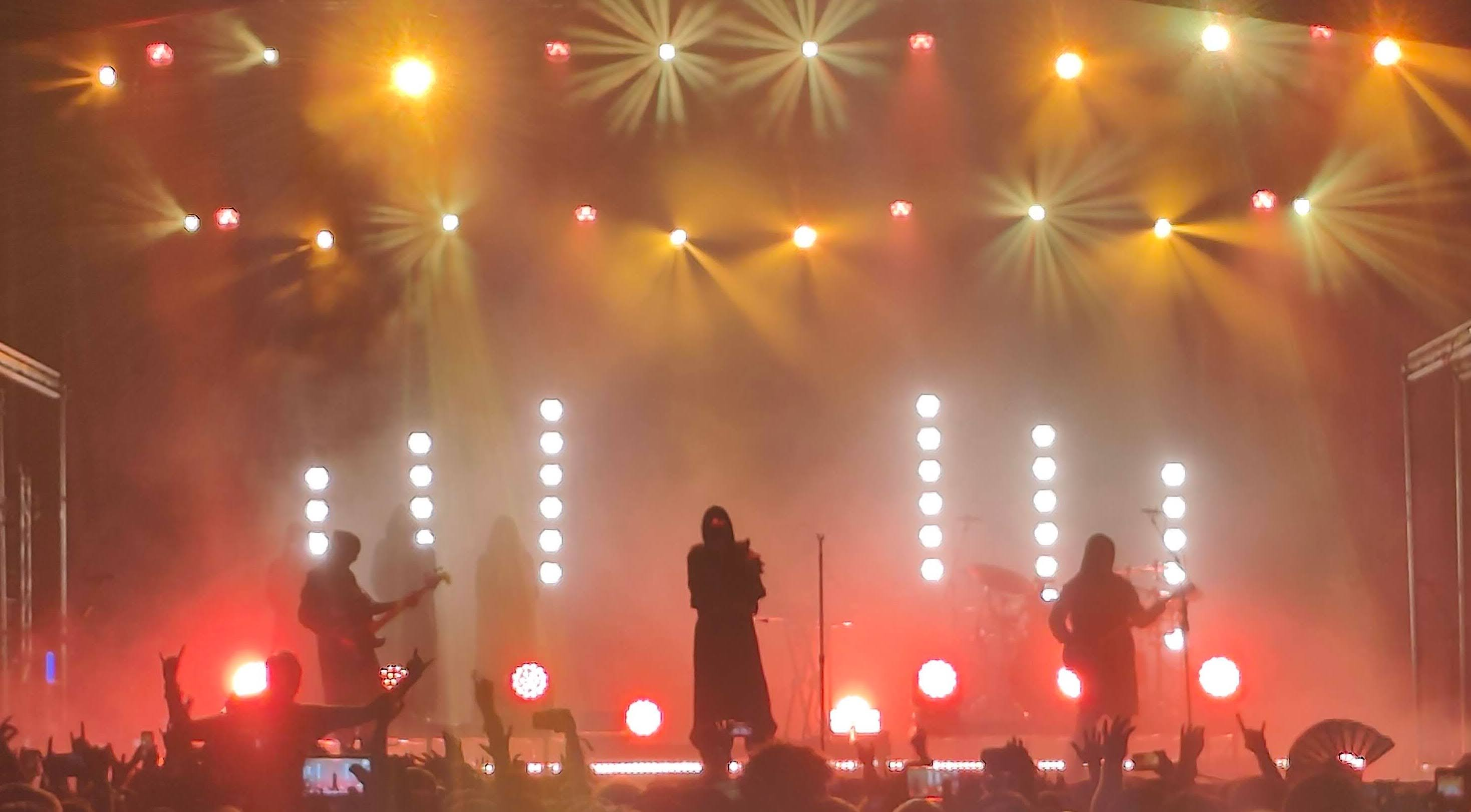
Sleep Token performing at Aftershock 2023

In December, the band played a standalone headline show at Wembley Arena, which was also announced in May. NME reported that tickets had sold out within ten minutes of them going on general sale. During the show, the band revealed new masks to indicate the band entering a new era.

Their immense success in 2023 was rewarded with widespread acclaim from the music press. Both Revolver and Rock Sound ranked Take Me Back to Eden as number 1 on their year-end lists, Kerrang! ranked the album third, Metal Hammer placed it as the fourth, and NME placed it 21st. Metal Hammer readers separately voted Take Me Back to Eden as the Best Album of the Year. Additionally, NME named "The Summoning" the 18th best song of the year.

Both Revolver and Rock Sound honoured Sleep Token with deluxe collector's issues of their magazines. Revolver recognised Sleep Token as their 'Artist of the Year' for 2023, while Rock Sound named them the 'Best British Band of the Year.' In an essay penned for Rock Sound, vocalist Will Ramos of Lorna Shore wrote: "There's been this idea that a metal band needs to be heavy, that you need to have a breakdown in every song... It's been so refreshing to see...bands like Sleep Token bring all these different sounds to the forefront of metal. [...] It's music like this that keeps [metal] alive. It doesn't just move the scene forward, it expands it."

By February 2024, Music Week reported that the album had sold over 50,000 copies in the United Kingdom. On 14 February 2024, Sleep Token announced that they signed a new deal with RCA Records.

In the summer of 2024, Sleep Token announced that a graphic novel titled Teeth of God would be published on 19 August by Sumerian Comics. The novel shares a title with the 2024 tours of the same name, and is based on events alluded to on the Take Me Back to Eden album. It was both written and illustrated by comic artist Huenito and colourist Fabi Marques.

On 22 August, Take Me Back to Eden won 'Best Album of the Year' at the Heavy Music Awards. On 12 December, it also won 'Top Hard Rock Album' at the 2024 Billboard Music Awards. In March 2026, Metal Hammer ranked Take Me Back to Eden as the fourth best metal album of the decade "so far". The magazine believes that the album helped the band "[pave] the way for a new school of metal."

=== Even in Arcadia (2025–present) ===
On 19 February 2025, the band released a TikTok video directing people to a website that teased new music. The website depicted the Shugborough inscription, which is associated with the painting Et in Arcadia ego ("Shepherds of Arcadia"), a hint to the title of the upcoming album. The website also allowed users to choose a "house" (initially assigned via e-mail), and could choose between either House Veridian or The Feathered Host. On 27 February 2025, the band created two separate Instagram accounts for the respective houses to which sheet music was posted, hinting at another unreleased song.

On 13 March 2025, Sleep Token released a single, "Emergence", and announced that their fourth album Even in Arcadia was to be released on 9 May 2025. Within a week, the single landed on the Billboard Hot 100 after gaining more than 9.9 million plays in the United States. The band also announced a U.S. arena headlining tour, which was set to commence in September 2025.

On 4 April 2025, the band released the album's second single, "Caramel". In the lead-up to its release, Sleep Token collaborated with North Carolina meteorologist Chris Michaels, known for incorporating metal references into his forecasts, to tease the track through a series of cryptic weather segments. It landed at number 34 on the Billboard Hot 100 for one week after its release, and received acclaim from the New York Times, with writer Jon Caramanica placing it atop his "50 Best Songs of 2025" list.

On 25 April 2025, the album's third single, "Damocles", was released.

Following its release, Even in Arcadia debuted at number one on the Billboard 200 with 127,000 album-equivalent units, becoming Sleep Token's first number-one album in the United States. It also recorded the largest streaming week for a hard rock album at the time.

In November 2025, they were nominated for two Grammy awards: "Emergence" for 'Best Metal Performance' and "Caramel" for 'Best Rock Song'. In December 2025, Even in Arcadia was awarded 'Album of the Year' by both the Revolver Awards and the Nocturnal Awards. "Caramel" won 'Radio Song of the Year' and Vessel won 'Masked Musician of the Year' at the Nocturnal Awards as well.

On 5 December 2025, Sleep Token released an official colouring book through UK independent publisher Rock N’ Roll Colouring.

The band continued to earn nominations and awards in 2026. Even in Arcadia won 'Rock Album of the Year' at the iHeartRadio Music Awards. Sleep Token was nominated for 'Rock Artist of the Year' at the iHeartRadio Music Awards and 'Group of the Year' at the Brit Awards. In April, the American Music Awards nominated Sleep Token for 'Best Rock/Alternative Artist', Even in Arcadia for 'Best Rock/Alternative Album', and their 2025 United States Even in Arcadia tour for 'Breakout Tour'.

In August 2026, bassist III, and guitarist IV debuted signature instruments with Jackson and Charvel.

== Artistry and identity ==
=== Backstory ===
==== Logo ====
The original logo, or sigil, is a simplified version of the current one, which made its debut on the cover art for "Hey Ya!" in February 2017. It is also used on the cover art for "Jaws" and "The Way That You Were" in 2018. Fans theorize that it may be created from the Elder Futhark alphabet, although nothing has been confirmed by the band. It was not until 2019 that the current iteration was revealed starting with Sundowning, seemingly incorporating more runes and symbols within it.

=== Anonymity ===
Since their formation, the members of Sleep Token have sought to remain anonymous. When asked exactly why they want to stay anonymous, their answer was this:

Our identities are unimportant. Music is marketed on who is or isn't in a band; it's [pushed], prodded and moulded into something it isn't. Vessel endeavours to keep the focus on His offerings.

Rich Hobson of Metal Hammer explains that the members, who all wear masks and cloaks, "obscure their faces, they don't talk onstage, and they have only ever done one interview." (Two interviews have actually been granted to date. One was with Metal Hammer itself in 2017, and the second was a video interview and playthrough with II on YouTube channel Drumeo in 2023.)

The group's focus on anonymity and visual style have been likened to similar practices employed by Ghost, Slipknot, and Gwar, though Vessel has rejected these comparisons. (Note: MH: "Do you worry people will liken you to bands like Ghost?" V: “No. The only comparison that can be drawn with Ghost is our anonymity. Our verses are a token, crafted to magnify and embody the multitude of emotion that writhes in our subconscious. Sonically our voice is rooted in the resonation between the notes and your emotion.”) Slipknot's frontman Corey Taylor has praised the band's image and artistry, comparing their approach to the one Slipknot took in the band's early days. (Note: Interview excerpt: "There are hints of early, early Slipknot there... At first we were like, 'Nope. You get nothing. This is what you get, you figure it out. We’ll let the music speak for ourselves'.")

==== Names ====
'Vessel' is the moniker of the lead singer and primary songwriter of the band. Vessel and drummer II are the only members of the band who have been credited as performers on Sleep Token's studio albums. II is also the only member apart from Vessel who has been given songwriting credits.

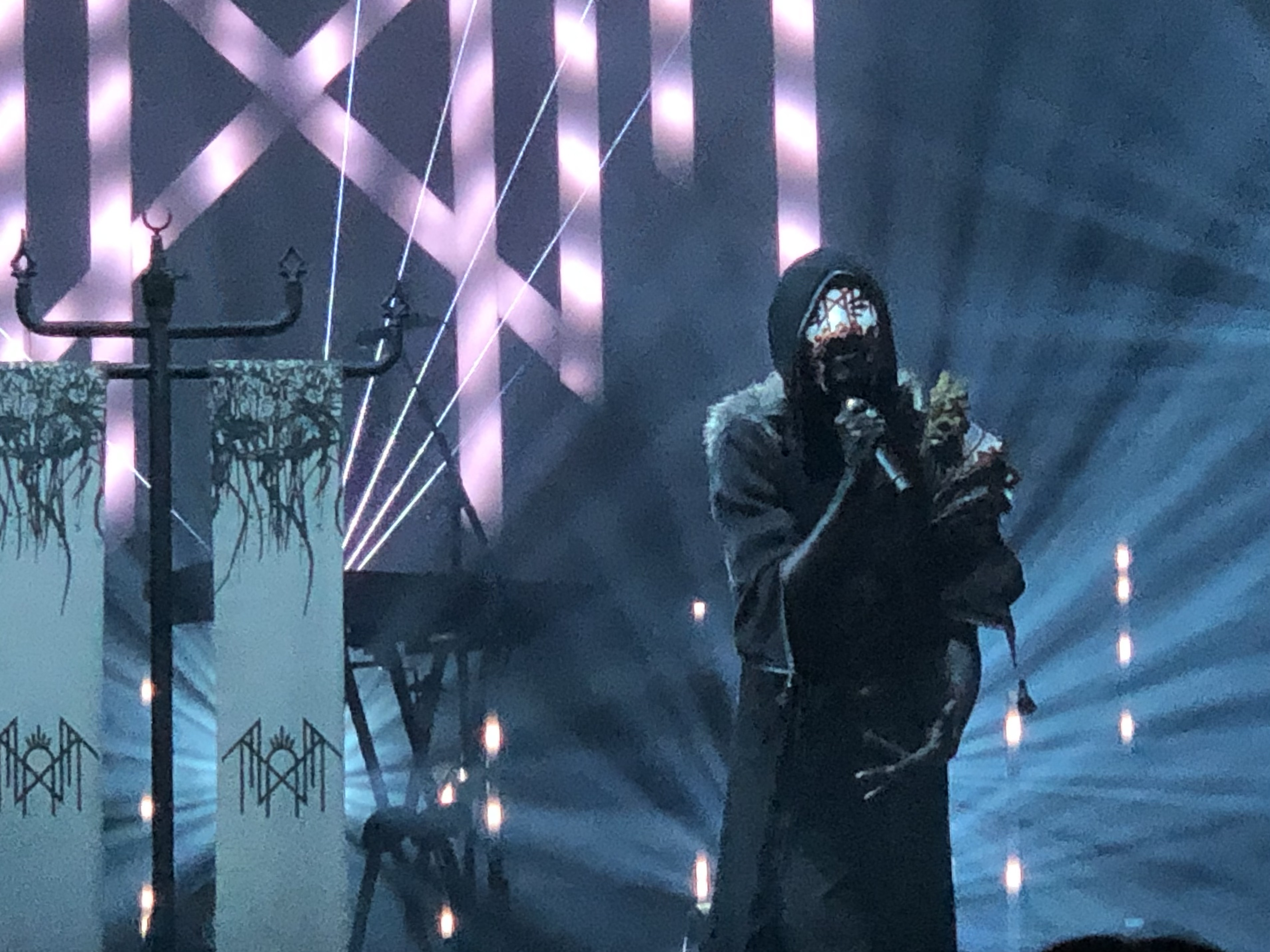
Lead singer Vessel during a concert.

==== Wardrobe ====
On stage, they conceal themselves with masks, long robes, and black body paint. Their stage outfits have evolved over the years.

In the 2017 Metal Hammer interview, Vessel revealed that the "markings on his mask" were the band's initials in "ancient runes". He is referring to his original mask, which can be seen in the videos for "Calcutta" and "Nazareth."

== Musical style ==
Musically, Sleep Token have been categorised in a wide range of genres, including alternative metal, post-metal, progressive metal, indie rock/pop, and djent. Emma Wilkes, of Revolver, noted elements of trap and jazz. According to Mary Varvaris of The Music, "[the band fuses] heavy metal, electronica, hip-hop, and modern-day djent/progressive metal." Rich Hobson has suggested that the band has a "fluid approach to genre", claiming that they incorporate "elements of everything from tech metal and alternative to pop and R&B". Similarly, John D. Buchanan of the website AllMusic has written that Sleep Token "combine post-rock, post-classical, and post-metal tropes with soulful indie pop vocals into a blend that sounds like nothing else".

The band have been vague, simply crediting "a plethora of artists" as inspiration. Early in their career, though, they did name Leprous, Agent Fresco, Bon Iver, Meshuggah and Failure as influences. In 2023, II cited British electronic music, drum and bass, Matt McDonaugh from Mudvayne, Joey Jordison of Slipknot, Derek Roddy of Nile, Hate Eternal and Malevolent Creation and Eric Moore, live drummer for Bobby Brown and Suicidal Tendencies, as his main influences. Commentators have also posited performers such as Casey, Loathe, Deftones, Cult of Luna, Explosions in the Sky and Ólafur Arnalds as possible influences.

== Collaborations and side projects ==
II, III and IV have pursued projects outside of the band using their Sleep Token monikers.

=== II ===
II has performed at drum festivals around Europe in 2024 and 2025.

In June 2025, he collaborated with MixWave to create a virtual "drum library". It consists of the gear that he often uses on tour.

On 5 July 2025, he participated in a "supergroup" performing "Changes" at Black Sabbath's and Ozzy Osbourne's final concert, "Back to the Beginning". He was joined onstage by vocalist Yungblud, guitarist Nuno Bettencourt of Extreme, bassist Frank Bello of Anthrax, and Black Sabbath's longtime touring keyboardist Adam Wakeman. The standout performance earned them a 2026 Grammy Award for 'Best Rock Performance' where he was credited as 'II'.

=== III ===
In 2023, he collaborated with Charvel to design a custom bass, although it was not for sale to the public. However, he collaborated with Richter in December 2025 to design a signature bass guitar strap for sale in black and adorned with several red question marks.

On 8 August 2025, III joined Trivium onstage at Bloodstock Open Air Festival to play bass on "Throes of Perdition". (Note: Time stamp: "36:17 Throes of Perdition - with III of Sleep Token")

=== IV ===
On 20 April 2024, IV joined Bring Me The Horizon on stage to perform guest vocals on "Antivist" during their final headlining show in Brisbane, Australia. Sleep Token was one of three supporting acts on Bring Me The Horizon's "Down Under 2024" tour. In a "moment of synergy", IV and frontman Oli Sykes donned matching black cloth masks while performing the song.

== Members ==
=== Main members ===
- Vessel – lead vocals, guitar, keyboards, bass (2016–present)
- II – drums, percussion (2016–present)

=== Touring musicians ===
- III – bass (2017–present)
- IV – guitar, unclean vocals (2021–present)
- Espera – backing vocals (2019–present)

=== Former touring musicians ===
- Unknown musician – guitar (2017–2019)
- Samuel Kubrick Finney – guitar (2019–2021) (Note: Interview excerpt: "In 2019, [Sam] was invited to join masked phenomenon Sleep Token, ultimately playing guitar in the group for two years. [...] 'I was a glorified session musician... I say that with no insult to what my role was, but that’s how that worked.'")

== Discography ==
- Sundowning (2019)
- This Place Will Become Your Tomb (2021)
- Take Me Back to Eden (2023)
- Even in Arcadia (2025)

== Awards and nominations ==
All awards and nominations listed should be in chronological order by the date they were nominated.

Year	Award	Nominee/work	Title	Result	Ref.
2018	Metal Hammer Golden Gods Awards	Sleep Token	Best New Artist	Nominated	
2019	Heavy Music Awards	Sleep Token	Best UK Breakthrough Band	Nominated	
2020	Heavy Music Awards	Sundowning	Best Album	Nominated	
2022	Heavy Music Awards	Sleep Token	Best UK Artist	Nominated	
2022	Heavy Music Awards	Sleep Token	Best Live Artist	Nominated	
2023	Heavy Music Awards	Sleep Token	Best UK Artist	Won	
2024	Heavy Music Awards	Take Me Back to Eden	Best Album	Won	
2024	Heavy Music Awards	Take Me Back to Eden	Best Album Artwork	Nominated	
2024	Heavy Music Awards	Sleep Token	Best UK Artist	Nominated	
2024	Heavy Music Awards	Sleep Token	Best UK Live Artist	Nominated	
2024	Billboard Music Awards	Take Me Back to Eden	Top Hard Rock Album	Won	
2025	Heavy Music Awards	Sleep Token	Best UK Artist	Nominated	
2025	Heavy Music Awards	Sleep Token	Best UK Live Artist	Nominated	
2025	Revolver Awards	Even in Arcadia	Album of the Year	Won	
2025	Nocturnal Awards	"Caramel"	Radio Song of the Year	Won	
2025	Nocturnal Awards	Even in Arcadia	Album of the Year	Won	
2025	Nocturnal Awards	Vessel	Masked Musician of the Year	Won	
2025	Nocturnal Awards	II	Masked Musician of the Year	Nominated	
2025	Nocturnal Awards	III	Masked Musician of the Year	Nominated	
2025	Nocturnal Awards	IV	Masked Musician of the Year	Nominated	
2026	Grammy Awards	"Emergence"	Best Metal Performance	Nominated	
2026	Grammy Awards	"Caramel"	Best Rock Song	Nominated	
2026	Brit Awards	Sleep Token	Group of the Year	Nominated	
2026	iHeartRadio Music Awards	Even in Arcadia	Rock Album of the Year	Won	
2026	iHeartRadio Music Awards	Sleep Token	Rock Artist of the Year	Nominated	
2026	American Music Awards	Even in Arcadia	Best Rock/Alternative Album	Nominated	
2026	American Music Awards	Sleep Token	Best Rock/Alternative Artist	Nominated	
2026	American Music Awards	Even in Arcadia 2025 U.S. Tour	Breakout Tour	Pending	
