= Et in Arcadia ego (Poussin) =

Painting by Nicolas Poussin

- Les Bergers d'Arcadie
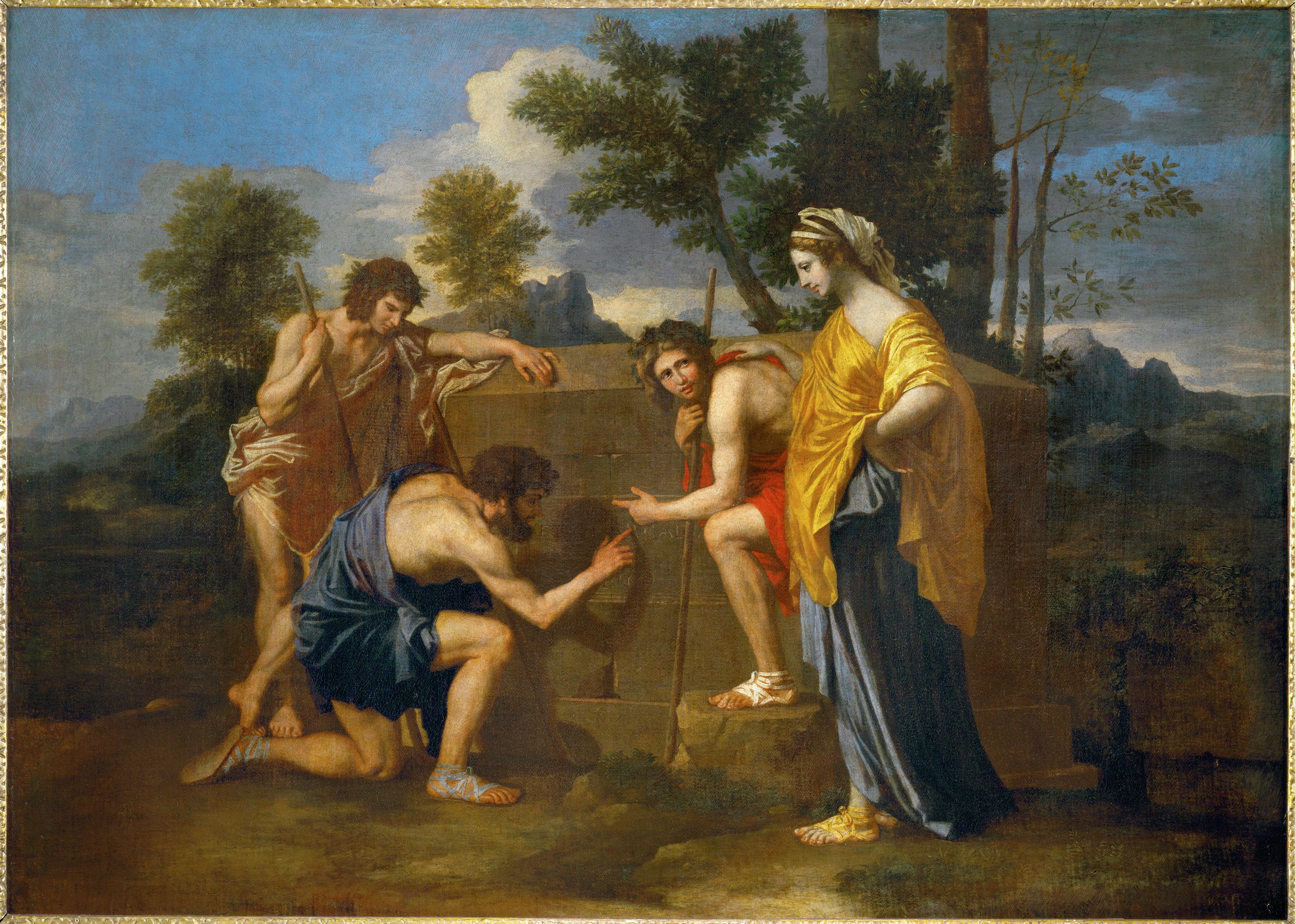
- Artist: Nicolas Poussin
- Year: 1637–1638
- Medium: oil on canvas
- Dimensions: 85 cm × 121 cm (34.25 in × 47.24 in)
- Location: Musée du Louvre, Paris

Et in Arcadia ego (also known as Les bergers d'Arcadie or The Arcadian Shepherds) is a 1637–38 painting by Classical painter Nicolas Poussin. It depicts a pastoral scene with idealized shepherds from classical antiquity, and a woman, possibly a shepherdess, gathered around an austere tomb that includes the Latin inscription "Et in Arcadia ego", which is translated to "Even in Arcadia, there am I"; "Also in Arcadia am I"; or "I too was in Arcadia". Poussin also painted another version of the subject in 1627 under the same title.

The 1630s version is held in the Musée du Louvre, Paris, while the 1627 version is held at Chatsworth House, England. An earlier treatment of the theme was painted by Guercino c. 1618–1622, also titled Et in Arcadia ego.

== Inspiration ==
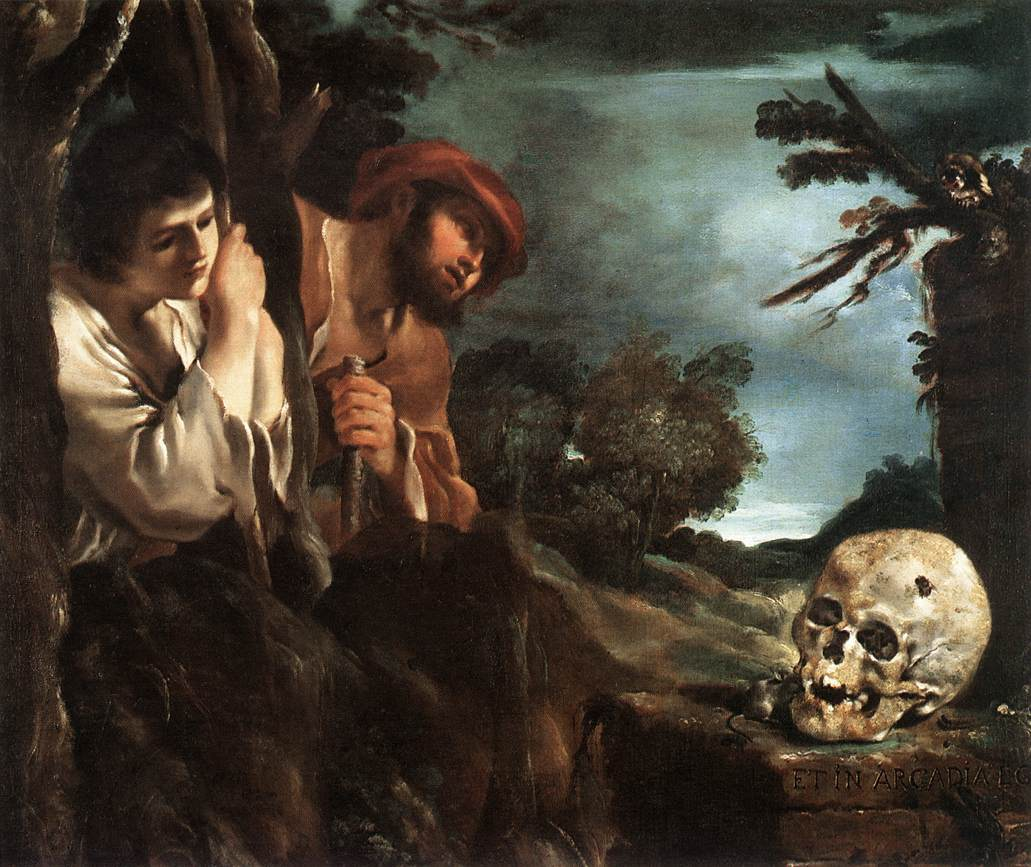
Guercino's version of the subject (c. 1618–1622)

A tomb with a memorial inscription (to Daphnis) amid the idyllic settings of Arcadia is first described in Virgil's Eclogues V 42 ff. Virgil took the idealized Sicilian rustics included in the Idylls of Theocritus and set them in the primitive Greek region of Arcadia (see Eclogues VII and X). The idea was taken up anew in the circle of Lorenzo de' Medici in the 1460s and 1470s, during the Florentine Renaissance.

In his pastoral work Arcadia (1504), Jacopo Sannazaro fixed the Early Modern perception of Arcadia as a lost world of idyllic bliss, remembered in regretful dirges. The first pictorial representation of the familiar memento mori theme, which was popularized in 16th-century Venice, now made more concrete and vivid by the inscription ET IN ARCADIA EGO, is Guercino's version, painted between 1618 and 1622. (It is held in the Galleria Nazionale d'Arte Antica, Rome.) The inscription gains force from the prominent presence of a skull in the foreground, beneath which the words are carved.

== 1627 version ==
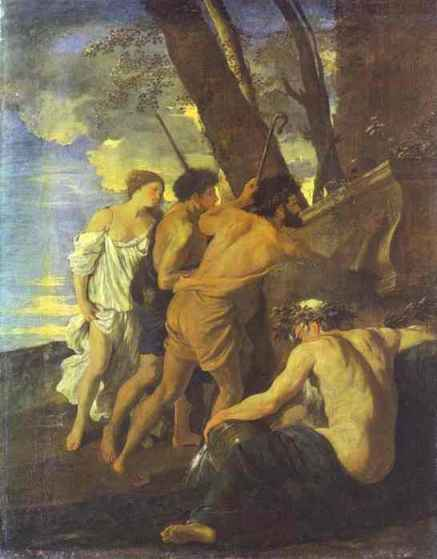
Poussin's 1627 version of the Et in Arcadia ego, in Chatsworth House, depicting a different tomb with the same inscription

Poussin's own first version of the painting (now in Chatsworth House) was probably commissioned as a reworking of Guercino's version. It is in a more Baroque style than the later version, and is characteristic of Poussin's early work. In the Chatsworth painting, the shepherds are discovering the half-hidden and overgrown tomb, and are reading the inscription with curious expressions. The woman, standing at the left, is posed in sexually suggestive fashion, very different from her austere counterpart in the later version, which is based on a statue from antiquity known as the Cesi Juno. The later version has a far more geometric composition and the figures are much more contemplative.

== Sculpted versions ==
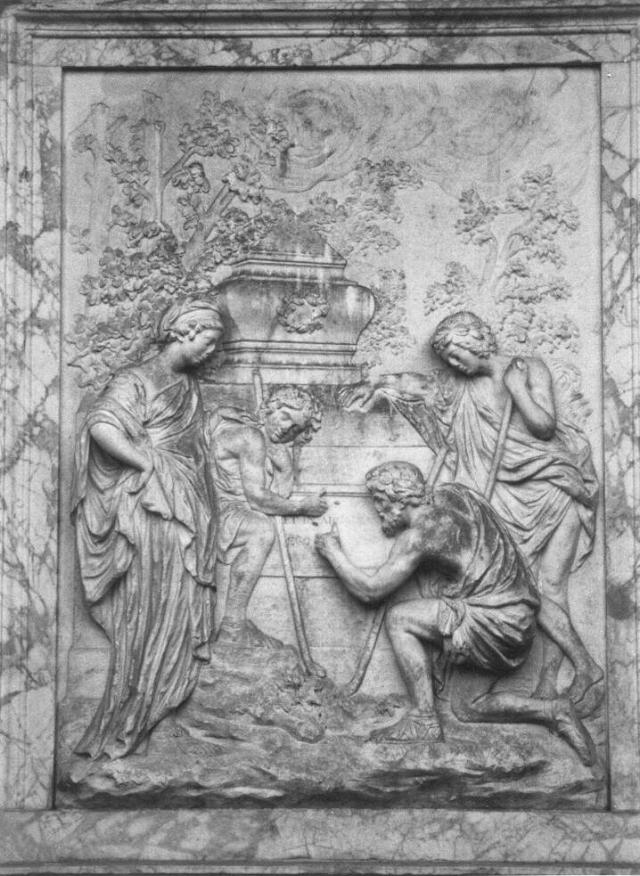
The Shugborough relief, adapted from an engraving of Poussin's second version

This undated, mid-eighteenth-century marble bas-relief is part of the Shepherd's Monument, a garden feature at Shugborough House, Staffordshire, England. Beneath it is the cryptic Shugborough inscription, as yet undeciphered. The reversed composition suggests that it was copied from an engraving, the compositions of which are commonly reversed because direct copies to the plate produce mirror images on printing.

In 1832 another relief was sculpted as part of the monument marking Poussin's tomb in Rome, on which it appears beneath a bust of the artist. In the words of art historian Richard Verdi, it appears as if the shepherds are contemplating "their own author's death."

== Interpretation ==
The literal translation of "Et in Arcadia Ego" is "Even in Arcadia, there am I". Poussin's earliest biographer, Giovanni Pietro Bellori, understood the 'I' of the phrase to refer to Death, thus making the painting a memento mori, reminding the viewer that even in the blissful utopia of Arcadia, death still exists. Another biographer, André Félibien, interpreted the 'I' to refer to the occupant of the tomb, but still took the overall meaning of the painting to be a reminder that death is present even in idyllic Arcadia.

The most important difference between the two versions is that in the latter version, one of the two shepherds recognizes the shadow of his companion on the tomb and circumscribes the silhouette with his finger. According to an ancient tradition (see Pliny the Elder, Natural History XXXV 5, 15), this is the moment in which the art of painting is first discovered. Thus, the shepherd's shadow is the first image in art history. But the shadow on the tomb is also a symbol of death (in the first version symbolized by a skull on the top of the tomb). The meaning of this highly intricate composition seems to be that, from prehistory onward, the discovery of art has been the creative response of humankind to the shocking fact of mortality. Thus, death’s claim to rule even Arcadia is challenged by art (symbolized by the beautifully dressed maiden), who must insist that she was discovered in Arcadia too, and that she is the legitimate ruler everywhere, whilst death only usurps its power.

The vagueness of the phrase is the subject of a famous essay by the art historian Erwin Panofsky, who suggested that, compared to Poussin's 1627 version, this second version shifted the focus from a warning about the inevitability of death to a contemplation of the past and a sense of nostalgia. In the course of this re-interpretation of his own composition by Poussin himself the meaning of the inscription changed. Notwithstanding the rules of Latin grammar, according to which et should be conjuncted with Arcadia, not with ego, in Panofsky’s view, the speaker now is no longer death, but the dead, who, speaking to the viewer from the tomb, reminds him that he himself once was enjoying his happy life in Arcadia. This new meaning of the second version prepared the way for the translation "Auch ich war in Arkadien (geboren)" ("I, too, was born in Arcadia") given by Herder, Schiller and Goethe. The sentence now comes out of the viewer’s mouth, which means that he, like every human being, once was born in Arcadia.

== In popular culture ==
Pierre Plantard, the creator of the Priory of Sion hoax, adopted "Et in Arcadia ego..." as the motto of both his family and the Priory of Sion.

Et in Arcadia Ego is also the title of the first section of the novel Brideshead Revisited by English author Evelyn Waugh. It details the early days of protagonist Charles Ryder’s association with the Flyte family and his early time at the University of Oxford.

In the novel Blood Meridian by American author Cormac McCarthy, the phrase is inscribed on a rifle owned by the book's primary antagonist, Judge Holden.

== See also ==
- List of paintings by Nicolas Poussin
- Et in Arcadia ego (Guercino)
