= Emigrate (band) =

American industrial metal band

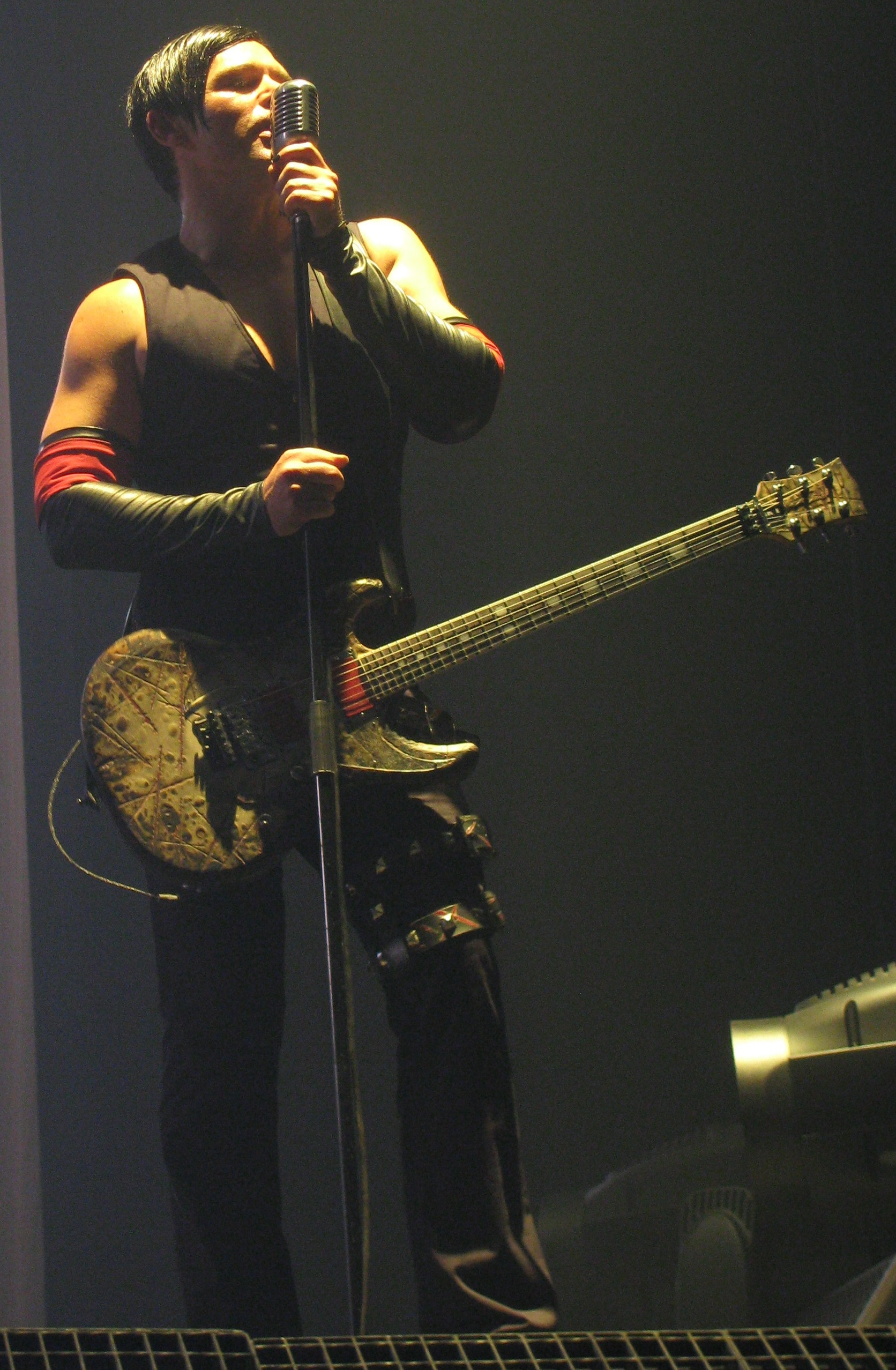
- Emigrate frontman Richard Kruspe in 2010

Background information
- Origin: New York City, U.S.
- Genres: Industrial metal, alternative metal, industrial rock, alternative rock
- Years active: 2005–2008, 2011–present
- Label: Spinefarm Records
- Members: Richard Kruspe; Arnaud Giroux; Mikko Sirén; Sky van Hoff
- Past members: Olsen Involtini; Henka Johansson
- Website: emigrate.eu

Emigrate is an industrial metal band formed in 2005 by Richard Kruspe of Rammstein as a side project. The band was formed in New York City and later relocated to Berlin. They have released four studio albums, with several musicians contributing to their recordings. Emigrate is a studio band, and have therefore never performed live.

== History ==
=== Formation and debut album (2000–2010) ===
The band's logo

During the recording of Rammstein's third studio album, Mutter, in 2000, tension and frustration within the band led Richard Kruspe to the idea of forming a side project where he could exercise full creative control. Kruspe relocated from Berlin to New York City in 2001 and officially formed Emigrate in 2005, during Rammstein's break. The guitarist started writing songs with his then-wife, Caron Bernstein, and recruited guitarist and producer Olsen Involtini, bassist Arnaud Giroux and Clawfinger drummer Henka Johansson for the recording of their self-titled debut album. In September 2006, samples for the songs "My World", "Babe" and "Temptation" off the band's upcoming album were made available online. On 27 July 2007, Kruspe made an appearance on Iron Maiden vocalist Bruce Dickinson's radio show on BBC in promotion of their debut album. Emigrate was released on 31 August 2007 and co-produced by long-time Rammstein collaborater Jacob Hellner. The single "My World" was later included in the soundtrack for Resident Evil: Extinction and a video for the song featured footage from the movie. The single "New York City" was released in October 2007. Kruspe put Emigrate on hiatus following Rammstein's decision to reunite and start work on their new studio album in 2007. A final single off the Emigrate's debut album, "Temptation" was released in March 2008. Kruspe focused full-time on Rammstein for the next three years.

=== Silent So Long and A Million Degrees (2011–2019) ===
In 2011, Kruspe moved back to Berlin. In June of that year, Joe Letz, who had appeared in the band's video for "My World" as a drummer, announced on social media that Kruspe had been working on a new album. In December 2012, an announcement made on Emigrate's Facebook page announced that studio sessions had been scheduled for the following month for the recording of an untitled sophomore album. In January 2013, Kruspe stated on social media that drums were being mixed for the new record. In January 2014, Kruspe announced that twenty tracks had been recorded for the album and that mixing would be performed in Los Angeles alongside Ben Grosse, with a projected release in the summer of 2014. On 7 March, 2014, Kruspe announced that work on the band's second album was completed. On July 22, 2014, a post was made to Emigrate's official Facebook page with a teaser trailer to Emigrate's new album, titled Silent So Long and an official release date of 17 October, 2014. Silent So Long was released on 9 December, 2014, and featured Mikko Sirén as the band's new drummer, in addition to guest vocals from Lemmy, Marilyn Manson, Jonathan Davis and Peaches.

On July 26, 2018, a post on the band's official Facebook page announced the upcoming filming of a new music video with guests Benjamin Kowalewicz and Ian D'Sa of Billy Talent, inviting applicants to participate in the video. The music video for the single "1234" was released on October 18. Emigrate's third album, A Million Degrees, was released on November 30, 2018, and featured Kowalewicz, Till Lindemann and Cardinal Copia as guest vocalists, in addition to production and instrumental contributions by Sky van Hoff. Kruspe revealed in interviews that he was forced to re-record the album following a flooding in his studio that destroyed his hard drives in 2016. The videos for the album's singles "You Are So Beautiful" and "War" was released on November 30, 2018 and March 5, 2019, respectively.

=== The Persistence of Memory (2020–present) ===
Following Rammstein's stadium tour in 2019 and during the COVID-19 pandemic, Kruspe began work on Emigrate's fourth studio album, featuring songs written and recorded before the release of their debut album. The album The Persistence of Memory was released on November 12, 2021 and produced by Kruspe, van Hoff and Olsen Involtini.

== Members ==
=== Current members ===
- Richard Kruspe – guitar, vocals, keyboards, electronics (2005–present)
- Arnaud Giroux – bass, backing vocals (2005–present)
- Mikko Sirén – drums (2013–present)
- Sky van Hoff – bass, synthesizer (2018–present)

=== Former members ===
- Henka Johansson – drums (2005–2008) and on The Persistence of Memory (2021)
- Olsen Involtini – rhythm guitar, backing vocals (2005–2018)

=== Contributors ===
- Joe Letz – music video performer (2007–2021)
- Andrea Marino – music video performer (2021)
- Alice Lane – music video performer (2021)
- Caron Bernstein – lyrics on Emigrate and The Persistence of Memory
- Margaux Bossieux – backing vocals on Emigrate, lyrics and vocals on Silent So Long, songwriter, lyrics and vocals on A Million Degrees, backing vocals on The Persistence of Memory
- Grace Risch – backing vocals on Emigrate
- Ruth Renner – backing vocals on Emigrate
- Sascha Moser – programming on Emigrate
- Frank Dellé – vocals on Silent So Long
- Peaches – vocals on Silent So Long
- Lemmy – vocals on Silent So Long
- Marilyn Manson – vocals on Silent So Long
- Jonathan Davis – vocals on Silent So Long
- Terry Matlin – lyrics on Silent So Long, A Million Degrees and The Persistence of Memory
- Thomas Borman – lyrics on Silent So Long and A Million Degrees
- Benjamin Kowalewicz – vocals on A Million Degrees
- Till Lindemann – lyrics and vocals on A Million Degrees, vocals on The Persistence of Memory
- Cardinal Copia – vocals on A Million Degrees
- Meral Al Me – backing vocals on A Million Degrees
- Kriss Jacob – backing vocals on A Million Degrees
- Steve Binetti – lead guitar on A Million Degrees
- Ghostkid – backing vocals on The Persistence of Memory
- Marcel Caccamese – backing vocals on The Persistence of Memory
- Matthias Schmitt – backing vocals on The Persistence of Memory
- Maxim Alaska Kruspe Bossieux – backing vocals on The Persistence of Memory
- Ufo Walter – bass on The Persistence of Memory
- Jens Dreesen – drums on The Persistence of Memory
- Leon Pfeiffer – percussion on The Persistence of Memory

== Discography ==
- Emigrate (2007)
- Silent So Long (2014)
- A Million Degrees (2018)
- The Persistence of Memory (2021)
