= Sky van Hoff =

German musician and producer

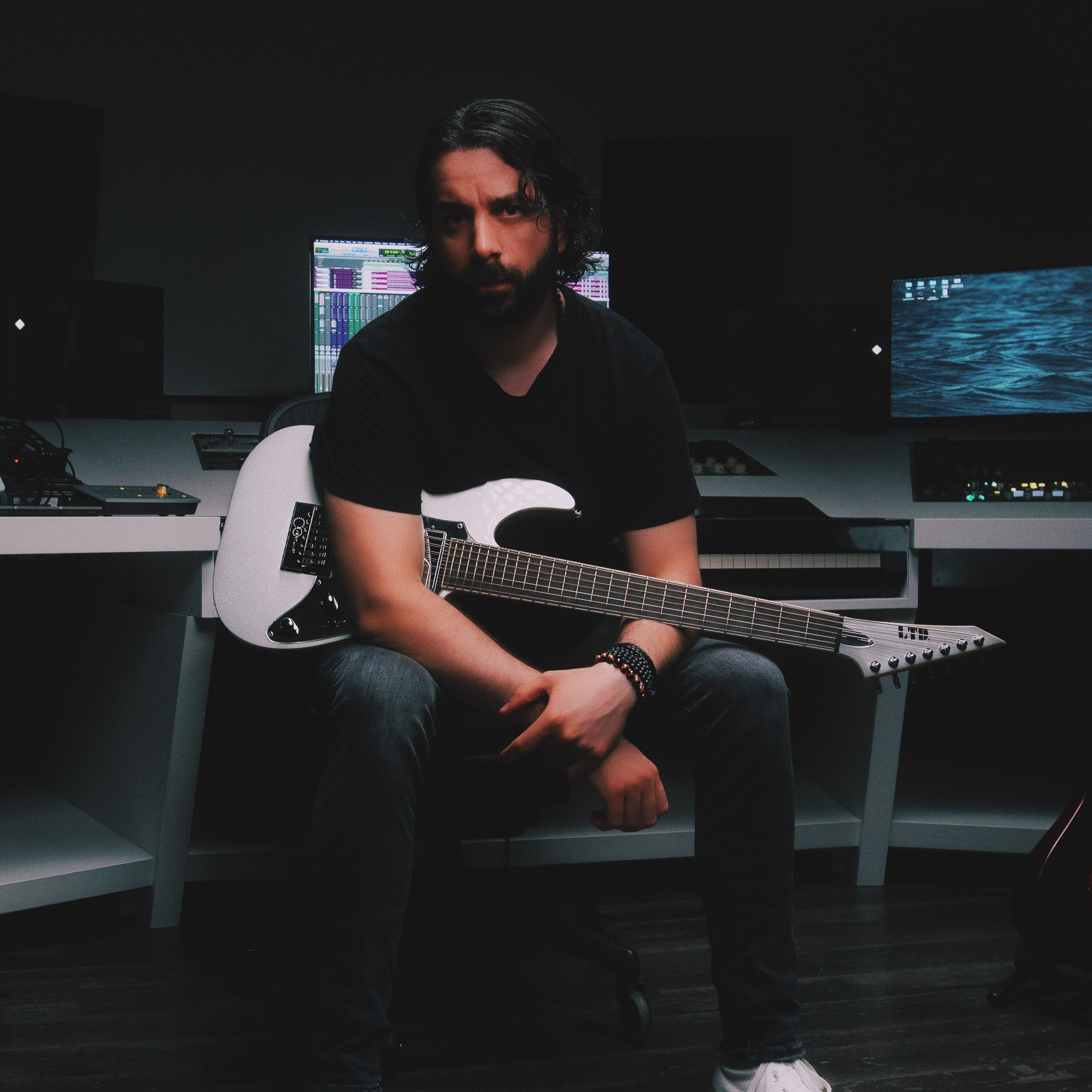
- van Hoff in the studio in 2021

Background information
- Born: Sky Hoff; 1986 (age 39–40)
- Origin: Cologne, Germany
- Genres: Rock; metal; indie; pop
- Occupations: Record producer; musician; songwriter; composer; engineer; record mixer
- Instruments: Guitar; Bass; Drums; Vocals; Synthesizer; Keyboards; Orchestral Arrangements
- Years active: 2003–present
- Formerly of: Machinemade God
- Website: https://www.skyvanhoff.com/

Sky van Hoff (born 1986) is a German record producer, songwriter and musician. He works primarily with acts in the metal and rock genres, including Rammstein, Emigrate, Till Lindemann, Sleep Token, Kreator and Electric Callboy, and has contributed to multiple platinum- and gold-certified productions. Before becoming a producer, van Hoff was a guitarist for metal band Machinemade God and toured extensively with the band until opening his own studio in 2008.

== Career ==
In 2003, van Hoff joined metal band Machinemade God as a guitarist and signed his first record deal as a band member with Metal Blade Records in 2005. His first album with the band, The Infinity Complex, was released the following year. He wrote and produced the band's next album, Masked, released the following year. After receiving requests to produce other German metal acts, van Hoff opened his own studio in 2008. In the years that followed, he worked with Kreator, The Sorrow and Caliban. In 2012, van Hoff appeared on the third season of the German version of The X Factor as a musical director for Sandra Nasić's team, where he supervised and produced the "Groups and Bands" category. He was a producer for the folk duo Mrs. Greenbird, the winner of the season, and subsequently produced their self-titled debut album released the same year.

In 2018, van Hoff contributed to Rammstein guitarist Richard Kruspe's solo project Emigrate and their third album, A Million Degrees, with production, recording and mixing. He was later brought in by Kruspe to record and edit guitar parts for Rammstein's untitled studio album. Following the album's release in 2019, van Hoff joined the band on their stadium tour as Kruspe's monitoring engineer. In 2021, van Hoff produced and composed the music for Rammstein singer Till Lindemann's first solo single, "Ich Hasse Kinder", and was a producer on Emigrate's fourth studio album, The Persistence of Memory. He received notable praise for his work on Lindemann's single from YouTube personality and music producer Rick Beato. van Hoff rejoined Rammstein in the studio for their next studio album, Zeit, contributing guitar production, recording and editing. After the album's release in 2022, van Hoff continued touring with the band as a monitoring engineer until the end of the tour the following year. He again collaborated with Lindemann on the singer's debut solo album, Zunge, as a producer, songwriter and instrumentalist.

== Discography ==
=== With Machinemade God ===
==== Studio albums ====
- The Infinity Complex (2006)
- Masked (2007)

=== Production and writing credits ===
Year	Artist	Title	Song(s)	Notes
2009	Caliban	Say Hello To Tragedy		Engineer
2010	Der Weg einer Freiheit	Der Weg einer Freiheit		Drum Recording engineer
2010	Kreator	Terror Prevails - Live At Rock Hard Festival		Mixer
2010	Arma Gathas	Dead To This World		Composer (orchestra, synthesizer and piano parts), producer, recording engineer, mixer, arrangements
2010	The Sorrow	The Sorrow		Co-producer, mixer
2011	Artwon Artown Artnow	–	"Love Rodeo"	Producer, engineer
2011	Artwon Artown Artnow	–	"My Lawyer"	Producer, engineer
2012	Kreator	Terror Prevails - Live at Rock Hard Festival, Pt. 2		Mixer
2012	Kreator	Phantom Antichrist		Recording engineer (pre-production)
2012	The Sorrow	Misery Escape		Composer, producer, mixer
2012	Mrs. Greenbird	Mrs. Greenbird		Producer, recording engineer, mixer
2015	Dikta	Easy Street		Producer, mixer
2015	Unleash The Sky	Youth		Producer, recording engineer, mixer
2016	Drescher	Erntezeit		Producer, mixer
2018	Emigrate	A Million Degrees		Recording engineer, mixer
2018	Hannah Trigwell	Red	"Nobody", "Another Beautiful Mistake"	Producer, recording engineer, mixer, arrangements
2018	Hopelezz	Stories Of A War Long Forgotten		Producer
2019	Rammstein	Untitled		Additional producer, recording engineer
2019	Mental Cruelty	Inferis		Producer, engineer, mixer, mastering
2019	Une Misère	Sermon	"Sermon"	Songwriter
2019	Une Misère	Sermon	All tracks	Producer, engineer, mixer
2019	Kassogtha	The Call		Mixer
2019	Eskimo Callboy	Rehab	"Rehab", "Hurricane", "Disbeliever", "Made By America", "Prism"	Songwriter
2019	Eskimo Callboy	Rehab	All tracks	Producer, mixer, arrangements
2020	Aborted	La Grande Mascarade	"Gloom And The Art Of Tribulation", "Serpent Of Depravity"	Recording engineer
2020	Eskimo Callboy	MMXX	"Prism"	Songwriter
2020	Enslaved	Utgard		Engineer, technician
2020	Ghostkid	Ghostkid		Producer, engineer, mixer, editing
2020	Shape Of Water	Great Illusions	"Scar", "Not All The Things"	Mixer
2021	Sleep Token	This Place Will Become Your Tomb		Mixer, editing
2021	Emigrate	The Persistence Of Memory		Producer, recording engineer, mixer, editing
2021	Till Lindemann	–	"Ich Hasse Kinder"	Composer, producer, engineer, mixer
2022	Ghostkid	–	"Ugly"	Songwriter, producer, engineer, mixer, editing
2022	Rammstein	Zeit		Additional producer, recording engineer, editing
2022	Dikta	–	"Dig Deeper"	Producer
2022	Nebelhaus	–	"Alle Jahre wieder"	Mixer
2023	Our Hollow, Our Home	–	"Downpour"	Producer, mixer
2023	Till Lindemann	Zunge	"Sport frei", "Altes Fleisch", "Du hast kein Herz", "Tanzlehrerin", "Schweiss"	Songwriter, producer, engineer, mixer
2024	Ghostkid	Hollywood Suicide		Producer

=== Instrumental and vocal credits ===
Year	Artist	Title	Song(s)	Notes
2006	Caliban	The Undying Darkness	"Nothing Is Forever", "Army Of Me"	Guitar
2009	Caliban	Say Hello To Tragedy	"The Denegation of Humanity"	Guitar (solo)
2010	Arma Gathas	Dead To This World		Orchestra, synthesizer, piano
2012	Kreator	Phantom Antichrist		Programming (pre-production)
2012	The Sorrow	Misery Escape		Electronics, strings
2012	Mrs. Greenbird	Mrs. Greenbird	"Shooting Stars & Fairy Tales", "After All", "It Will Never Rain Roses"	Bass
2012	Mrs. Greenbird	Mrs. Greenbird		Piano
2015	Unleash The Sky	Youth	"Concrete Walls"	Vocals
2015	Unleash The Sky	Youth		Programming, synths
2018	Emigrate	A Million Degrees		Bass, synthesizer
2018	Hannah Trigwell	Red	"Nobody", "Another Beautiful Mistake"	Guitar, instruments
2019	Une Misère	Sermon	"Sermon"	Backing vocals
2019	Eskimo Callboy	Rehab		Synthesizer, electronics
2020	Ghostkid	Ghostkid		Guitar, bass, synthesizer
2021	Sleep Token	This Place Will Become Your Tomb		Synthesizer, programming
2021	Emigrate	The Persistence Of Memory		Bass
2021	Till Lindemann	–	"Ich Hasse Kinder"	All instruments except drums, programming
2022	Ghostkid	–	"Ugly"	Guitar, bass, synthesizer, programming
2023	Till Lindemann	Zunge	"Sport frei", "Altes Fleisch", "Du hast kein Herz", "Tanzlehrerin", "Schweiss"	All instruments except drums
