= The Persistence of Memory (album) =

Studio album by Emigrate
- Released: November 12, 2021
- Studio: Studio Engine 55 (Berlin, Germany); Funkhaus Studio (Berlin, Germany); Sky van Hoff Studios
- Genre: Alternative metal, industrial rock, pop metal
- Length: 34:17
- Label: Sony
- Producer: Richard Kruspe; Sky van Hoff; Olsen Involtini

Emigrate chronology
A Million Degrees (2018)	The Persistence of Memory (2021)

Professional ratings
Review scores
Source	Rating
Kerrang!	3/5
laut.de	1/5 stars
Loudersound	3.5/5 stars
metal-hammer.de	5.5/7

The Persistence of Memory is the fourth studio album by the rock band Emigrate. It was released on November 12, 2021, through Sony Music Entertainment. Recording sessions took place at Studio Engine 55 in Berlin, at Funkhaus Studio in Berlin-Treptow-Köpenick, and at Sky van Hoff Studios. Production was handled by Richard Kruspe, Sky van Hoff and Olsen Involtini. It features a guest appearance from Till Lindemann. The album debuted at number 39 on the Offizielle Deutsche Charts.

Music videos were released for "Freeze My Mind" and "You Can't Run Away", both directed by Anuk Rohde, and "I'm Still Alive", directed by David Gesslbauer.

== Track listing ==
All lyrics are written by Richard Kruspe and Terrence Matlin, except for track 1 written with Caron Bernstein, and track 2 written by Johnny Christopher, Mark James & Wayne Carson; all music is composed by Richard Kruspe and Terrence Matlin, except for track 2 composed by Johnny Christopher, Mark James & Wayne Carson.

No.	Title	Length
1.	"Rage"	4:19
2.	"Always on My Mind"	3:29
3.	"Freeze My Mind"	3:19
4.	"I'm Still Alive"	3:00
5.	"Come Over"	3:47
6.	"You Can't Run Away"	4:09
7.	"Hypothetical"	3:51
8.	"Blood Stained Wedding"	4:56
9.	"I Will Let You Go"	3:27
Total length:		34:17

== Personnel ==
- Richard Kruspe – lyrics & music (tracks: 1, 3–9), instrument, producer
- Terrence Matlin – lyrics (tracks: 1, 3–9)
- Arnaud Giroux – bass, artwork
- Sky van Hoff – bass, producer, recording, mixing
- Jens Dreesen – drums (tracks: 1, 5), mastering
- Mikko Sirén – drums (tracks: 2, 4, 6–9)
- Henka Johansson – drums (track 3)
- Ghostkid – backing vocals
- Margaux Bossieux – backing vocals
- Maxim Alaska Kruspe Bossieux – backing vocals
- Caron Bernstein – lyrics (track 1)
- Johnny Christopher – lyrics & music (track 2)
- Mark James – lyrics & music (track 2)
- Wayne Carson Thompson – lyrics & music (track 2)
- Marcel Caccamese – backing vocals (track 1)
- Matthias Schmitt – backing vocals (track 1)
- Till Lindemann – vocals (track 2)
- Ufo Walter – bass (track 6)
- Leon Pfeiffer – additional percussion (track 6)
- Olsen Involtini – producer, recording
- Anne Rebenstorff – management
- Sven Kaselow – management

== Charts ==
Chart performance for The Persistence of Memory
Chart (2021)	Peak position
Belgian Albums (Ultratop Wallonia)	181
German Albums (Offizielle Top 100)	39
UK Album Downloads (OCC)	81
UK Rock & Metal Albums (OCC)	14
