= Hunny Hunny =

"Hunny Hunny"/ "Chatterbox (Pt. 2)"

Single by Book of Love

from the album Lovebubble
- A-side: "Double A-side single"
- Released: 23 September 1993
- Recorded: 1992–1993
- Genre: Synthpop, new wave
- Length: "Hunny Hunny"; 4:06 (album version); 4:09 (radio remix) "Chatterbox (Pt. 2)"; 3:32 (album version)
- Label: Sire Records
- Songwriters: Lauren Roselli and Ted Ottaviano ("Hunny Hunny"); Jade Lee and Ted Ottaviano ["Chatterbox (Pt. 2)"]
- Producer: Ted Ottaviano

Book of Love singles chronology
"Boy Pop" (1993)	"Hunny Hunny"/ "Chatterbox (Pt. 2)" (1993)	"Boy (Remixes)" (2001)

Music video
- Hunny Hunny on YouTube

Alternate cover
- German CD Maxi-Single sleeve

"Hunny Hunny"/"Chatterbox (Pt. 2)" is the twelfth single released by the American synthpop band Book of Love. The single is a double A-side single, and was released on September 23, 1993, as the second single from the band's fourth album Lovebubble.

"Hunny Hunny" was written by band member Ted Ottaviano, and "Chatterbox (Pt. 2)" by Jade Lee and Ted Ottaviano; the latter was a spoken word commentary featuring the two members.

"Hunny Hunny" was remixed by Ben Grosse into seven different remixes for the singles. The song "Chatterbox (Pt. 2)" was remixed into five different remixes by Tony Garcia and Guido Osorio.

== Track listings ==
=== 1993 12" Maxi-Single (Sire Records 9 41052-0) ===
Side A:

1. "Hunny Hunny" (Sweet & Sticky Mix) - 5:39
2. "Hunny Hunny" (Sweet & Sticky Dub) - 5:34
3. "Hunny Hunny" (Tribal Rock Mix) - 5:04
4. "Hunny Hunny" (Tribal Rock Edit) - 4:01

Side B:

1. "Chatterbox (Pt. 2)" (Late Nite Chat Mix) - 5:45
2. "Chatterbox (Pt. 2)" (Unspoken Dub) - 5:47
3. "Chatterbox (Pt. 2)" (Translator Mix) - 6:11
4. "Chatterbox (Pt. 2)" (Translator Instrumental) - 6:26

=== 1993 CD Maxi-Single (Sire Records 9 41052-2) ===
1. "Hunny Hunny" (Radio Remix) - 4:09
2. "Chatterbox (Pt. 2)" (Album Version) - 3:32
3. "Hunny Hunny" (Sweet & Sticky Mix) - 5:39
4. "Chatterbox (Pt. 2)" (Translator Mix) - 6:11
5. "Hunny Hunny" (Tribal Rock Mix) - 5:04
6. "Chatterbox (Pt. 2)" (Late Nite Chat Mix) - 5:45
7. "Chatterbox (Pt. 2)" (Translator Instrumental) - 6:26
8. "Hunny Hunny" (Sweet & Sticky Edit) - 3:47
9. "Chatterbox (Pt. 2)" (Late Nite Chat Edit) - 4:00
10. "Chatterbox (Pt. 1)" (Album Version) - 1:09

=== 1993 "Hunny Hunny" Cassette Single (Sire Records 9 18388-4) ===
Side A: "Hunny Hunny" (Radio Remix) - 4:09
Side B: "Hunny Hunny" (Album Version) - 4:05

=== 1993 "Hunny Hunny" Promo CD Single (Sire Records PRO-CD-6332) ===
1. "Hunny Hunny" (Radio Remix) - 4:09
2. "Hunny Hunny" (Sweet & Sticky Edit) - 3:47
3. "Hunny Hunny" (Album Version) - 4:05

=== 1993 "Hunny Hunny" Promo 12" Single Sire Records PRO-A-6332) ===
Side A:

1. "Hunny Hunny" (Sweet & Sticky Mix) - 5:39
2. "Hunny Hunny" (Sweet & Sticky Dub) - 5:34
3. "Hunny Hunny" (Sweet & Sticky Edit) - 3:47

Side B:

1. "Hunny Hunny" (Tribal Rock Mix) - 5:04
2. "Hunny Hunny" (Tribal Rock Edit) - 4:01
3. "Hunny Hunny" (Radio Remix) - 4:09

=== 1993 European "Hunny Hunny" (Special DJ Edit) CD Maxi-Single (Sire Records W 0212CD DJ) ===
1. "Hunny Hunny" (Radio Remix Edit) - 3:30
2. "Hunny Hunny" (Sweet & Sticky Edit) - 3:47
3. "Hunny Hunny" (Sweet & Sticky Mix) - 5:39
4. "Chatterbox (Pt. 2)" (Late Night Chat Mix) - 5:45

== Personnel ==
"Hunny Hunny" written by Ted Ottaviano. "Chatterbox (Pt. 2)" written by Jade Lee and Ted Ottaviano. "Chatterbox (Pt. 1)" written by Jade Lee. All instruments arranged, programmed, and performed by Book of Love.

- Lauren Roselli - Keyboards, backing vocals, lead vocals on "Hunny Hunny"
- Ted Ottaviano - Keyboards
- Jade Lee - Keyboards, Percussion, backing vocals, lead vocals on "Chatterbox (Pt. 2)" & "Chatterbox (Pt. 1)"
- Susan Ottaviano - Vocals

Credits

- Produced by Ted Ottaviano.
- "Hunny Hunny"
  Mix and Additional Production: Ben Grosse.
  Mixes and Additional Recording done at Pearl Sound Studios, Canton, MI.
  Assisted by Dave Skryznski and Bill Bingham.
  Programming on 'Sweet & Sticky Mix', 'Sweet and Sticky Edit', and 'Sweet & Sticky Dub' by Ben Grosse and The Funky Bass Team.
  Programming on 'Tribal Rock Mix' and 'Tribal Rock Edit' by Ben Grosse and John Vitale.
  Guitars on 'Radio Remix' and 'Radio Remix Edit' by Curtis Mathewson.
- "Chatterbox (Pt. 2)"
  Additional Production by Tony Garcia for MCT.
  Remixed by Tony Garcia and Guido Osorio for MCT.
- Design: David Harlan and Heather Laurie

== Official versions ==
Year	Official versions of "Hunny Hunny"	Length	Mixed/Remixed by	Comment
1993	Album version	4:06	Michael Hutchinson	Found on the CD maxi-single (Sire Records 9 41052-2), promo CD single (Sire Records PRO-CD-6332), cassette single (Sire Records 9 18388-4), and all formats of the album Lovebubble.*
1993	Radio Remix	4:09	Ben Grosse	Found on the promo 12" single (Sire Records PRO-A-6332), CD maxi-single (Sire Records 9 41052-2), promo CD single (Sire Records PRO-CD-6332), the cassette single (Sire Records 9 18388-4), and the CD of I Touch Roses: The Best of Book of Love.*
1993	Radio Remix Edit	3:30	Ben Grosse	Special DJ edit of the 'Radio Remix'. Found exclusively on the European CD maxi-single (Sire Records W 0212CD DJ).
1993	Sweet & Sticky Mix	5:39	Ben Grosse	Found on the 12" vinyl maxi-single (Sire Records 9 41052-0), the promo 12" single (Sire Records PRO-A-6332), CD maxi-single (Sire Records 9 41052-2), promo CD single (Sire Records PRO-CD-6332), and the 2009 CD reissue of Lovebubble (Noble Rot).
1993	Sweet & Sticky Edit	3:47	Ben Grosse	Found on the promo 12" single (Sire Records PRO-A-6332), CD maxi-single (Sire Records 9 41052-2), and the promo CD single (Sire Records PRO-CD-6332).
1993	Sweet & Sticky Dub	5:34	Ben Grosse	Found on the 12" vinyl maxi-single (Sire Records 9 41052-0), and the promo 12" single (Sire Records PRO-A-6332).
1993	Tribal Rock Mix	5:04	Ben Grosse	Found on the 12" vinyl maxi-single (Sire Records 9 41052-0), promo 12" single (Sire Records PRO-A-6332), and the CD maxi-single (Sire Records 9 41052-2).
1993	Tribal Rock Edit	4:01	Ben Grosse	Found on the 12" vinyl maxi-single (Sire Records 9 41052-0) and the promo 12" single (Sire Records PRO-A-6332).

Year	Official versions of "Chatterbox (Pt. 2)"	Length	Mixed/Remixed by	Comment
1993	Album version	3:32	Hugo Dwyer	Found on the CD maxi-single (Sire Records 9 41052-2), and all formats of the album Lovebubble.*
1993	"Chatterbox (Pt. 1)" Album version	1:10	Ted Ottaviano	Found on the CD maxi-single (Sire Records 9 41052-2), and all formats of the album Lovebubble.*
1993	Late Nite Chat Mix	5:45	Tony Garcia; Guido Osorio	Found on the 12" vinyl maxi-single (Sire Records 9 41052-0), CD maxi-single (Sire Records 9 41052-2), German DJ CD single (Sire Records W 0212CD DJ), and the 2009 CD reissue of Lovebubble (Noble Rot).
1993	Late Nite Chat Edit	4:00	Tony Garcia; Guido Osorio	Found exclusively on the CD maxi-single (Sire Records 9 41052-2).
1993	Translator Mix	6:11	Tony Garcia; Guido Osorio	Found on the 12" vinyl maxi-single (Sire Records 9 41052-0), and the CD maxi-single (Sire Records 9 41052-2).
1993	Translator Instrumental	6:26	Tony Garcia; Guido Osorio	Found on the 12" vinyl maxi-single (Sire Records 9 41052-0), and the CD maxi-single (Sire Records 9 41052-2).
1993	Unspoken Dub	5:47	Tony Garcia; Guido Osorio	Found exclusively on the 12" vinyl maxi-single (Sire Records 9 41052-0).

" * " denotes that version is available as digital download
