= Counting the Rosaries =

"Counting The Rosaries"

Single by Book of Love

from the album Candy Carol
- B-side: "Sunny Day" (Single Remix)
- Released: 7 November 1991
- Recorded: 1989–1990
- Genre: Synthpop, new wave
- Length: 3:40 (album version)
- Label: Sire Records
- Songwriter(s): Lauren Roselli; Theodore Ottaviano
- Producer(s): Ted Ottaviano and Ben Grosse

Book of Love singles chronology
| "Sunny Day" (1991) | "Counting The Rosaries" (1991) | "Boy Pop" (1993) |

"Counting the Rosaries" is the tenth single released by the American synthpop band Book of Love. The song was released as the third and final single from the band's third album, 1991's Candy Carol.

"Counting the Rosaries" was written by band members Lauren Roselli and Ted Ottaviano. The single's back sleeve and inner CD sleeve artwork contains instructions titled 'How To Say The Rosary', and continues, "The Rosary is a form of vocal and mental prayer on the mysteries of our redemption, divided into fifteen decades. The recitation of each decade is accompanied by meditation on one of the fifteen events or "mysteries". The Mysteries consist of three groups, The Joyful, The Sorrowful, and The Glorious."

Marc Roselli, a Jesuit priest and brother of band member Lauren Roselli, sang the Sanctus from a Mass on the track. "Counting The Rosaries" was remixed for the 12" single and CD single into five different remixes, three by Ben Grosse and two by Bill Coleman.

Also appearing on the singles are the 'Single Remix' and 'Heal Your Positive Body' remix of Candy Carol track "Sunny Day".

== Track listings ==
=== 1991 12" Maxi-Single (Sire Records 9 40240-0) ===
Side A:

1. "Counting The Rosaries" (Full Confession Mix) - 7:58
2. "Counting The Rosaries" (Full Confession Dub) - 5:53

Side B:

1. "Counting The Rosaries" (Happiness & Love Mix) - 6:17
2. "Counting The Rosaries" (Crying Angels Mix) - 5:03
3. "Sunny Day" (Heal Your Positive Body Mix) - 6:04

=== 1991 CD Maxi-Single (Sire Records 9 40240-2) ===
1. "Counting The Rosaries" (Partial Confession Mix) - 4:11
2. "Counting The Rosaries" (Full Confession Mix) - 7:58
3. "Counting The Rosaries" (Happiness & Love Mix) - 6:17
4. "Sunny Day" (Heal Your Positive Body Mix) - 6:04
5. "Counting The Rosaries" (Crying Angels Mix) - 5:03
6. "Counting The Rosaries" (Album Version) - 3:32
7. "Sunny Day" (Single Remix) - 3:48

== Personnel ==
"Counting The Rosaries" written by Lauren Roselli and Ted Ottaviano. "Sunny Day" written by Theodore Ottaviano. All instruments arranged, programmed, and performed by Book of Love.

- Lauren Roselli - Keyboards, backing vocals (lead vocals on "Counting The Rosaries")
- Ted Ottaviano - Keyboards, backing vocals (lead vocals on "Sunny Day")
- Jade Lee - Keyboards, Percussion, backing vocals
- Susan Ottaviano - backing vocals

Credits

- Produced by Ted Ottaviano and Ben Grosse.
- Remix and additional production on 'Partial Confession Mix', 'Full Confession Mix', and 'Full Confession Dub' by Ben Grosse;
  Programming by John Vitale and Ben Grosse;
  Assisted by Matt King and Walter Balfour
- Post production and remix on 'Happiness & Love Mix' and 'Crying Angels Mix' by Bill Coleman for Peace Bisquit Productions;
  Engineer: Heinrich Zwahlen @ Spike Recording, NYC
- 'Happiness & Love Mix' features Leslie Winer;
  Leslie Winer appears courtesy of Rhythm King Records, UK
- "Sunny Day" (Heal Your Positive Body Mix) remixed by Book of Love
- "Sunny Day" (Single Remix) remixed by Ben Grosse
- Sanctus on "Counting The Rosaries" sung by Marc Roselli, S.J.
- Guitars on "Sunny Day" by Ray Carroll

== Official versions ==
| Year | Version | Length | Mixed/Remixed by | Comment |
|---|---|---|---|---|
| 1991 | Album version | 3:40 | Ben Grosse | Found on the CD maxi-single (Sire Records 9 40240-2), and all formats of the album Candy Carol.* |
| 1991 | Partial Confession Mix | 4:11 | Ben Grosse | A short edit of the 'Full Confession Mix'. Found on the 12" vinyl single (Sire Records 9 40240-0), and the CD single (Sire Records Sire Records 9 40240-2). |
| 1991 | Full Confession Mix | 7:58 | Ben Grosse | Found on the 12" vinyl single (Sire Records 9 40240-0), and the CD single (Sire Records Sire Records 9 40240-2). |
| 1991 | Full Confession Dub | 5:53 | Ben Grosse | Found exclusively on the 12" vinyl single (Sire Records 9 40240-0). |
| 1991 | Happiness & Love Mix | 6:17 | Ben Grosse; Bill Coleman | Found on the 12" vinyl single (Sire Records 9 40240-0), the CD single (Sire Records Sire Records 9 40240-2), and the 2009 reissue CD of Candy Carol (Noble Rot). |
| 1991 | Crying Angels Mix | 7:16 | Ben Grosse; Bill Coleman | Found on the 12" vinyl single (Sire Records 9 40240-0), and the CD single (Sire Records Sire Records 9 40240-2). |

" * " denotes that version is available as digital download
