= Silent So Long =

Studio album by Emigrate
- Released: November 14, 2014 (EU)
- Studio: Studio Engine 55 (Berlin, Germany); Funkhaus Studio (Berlin, Germany)
- Genre: Industrial metal; alternative metal
- Length: 43:51
- Label: Vertigo Berlin; Universal
- Producer: Emigrate

Emigrate chronology
| Emigrate (2007) | Silent So Long (2014) | A Million Degrees (2018) |

Professional ratings
Review scores
| Source | Rating |
|---|---|
| Blabbermouth.net | 9/10 |
| Exclaim! | 5/10 |
| Metal Hammer | 5/7 |

Silent So Long is the second studio album by industrial rock band Emigrate. It was released on November 14, 2014 in Europe and December 9, 2014 in the United States via Vertigo/Capitol and Spinefarm/Universal Music. Recording session took place at Studio Engine 55 and at Funkhaus Studio in Berlin, with vocals for "Hypothetical" recorded at Poolhouse in Los Angeles. It features guest appearances from Frank Dellé of Seeed, Jonathan Davis, Lemmy, Margaux Bossieux, Marilyn Manson and Peaches.

Frontman Richard Kruspe's equipment included ESP Guitars, Mesa Boogie Rectifier amps, Pro Tools, Apple Logic, Jim Dunlop pedals, strings and guitar picks, TC Electronic effects and pedals, EMG guitar pickups, and Native Instruments plug-ins.

== Track listing ==
All lyrics are written by Richard Kruspe, Terry Matlin, Thomas Borman and Margaux Bossieux; all music is composed by Richard Kruspe.

| No. | Title | Length |
|---|---|---|
| 1. | "Eat You Alive" (featuring Frank Dellé of Seeed) | 3:33 |
| 2. | "Get Down" (featuring Peaches) | 4:32 |
| 3. | "Rock City" (featuring Lemmy Kilmister) | 3:28 |
| 4. | "Hypothetical" (featuring Marilyn Manson) | 3:50 |
| 5. | "Rainbow" | 3:34 |
| 6. | "Born On My Own" | 4:40 |
| 7. | "Giving Up" | 3:58 |
| 8. | "My Pleasure" | 3:36 |
| 9. | "Happy Times" (featuring Margaux Bossieux) | 3:36 |
| 10. | "Faust" | 3:42 |
| 11. | "Silent So Long" (featuring Jonathan Davis) | 5:17 |
| Total length: | | 43:51 |

== Personnel ==
- Richard Kruspe – lyrics, guitars, vocals, keyboards, electro sequencer
- Terry Matlin – lyrics
- Thomas Borman – lyrics
- Margaux Bossieux – lyrics, backing vocals, featured artist (track 9)
- Sascha Moser – drum and guitar editing
- Mikko Sirén – drums
- Arnaud Giroux – bass, vocal recording and production, cover design
- Olsen Involtini – additional guitars, vocal recording and production, drum recording and engineering
- Florian Ammon – vocal recording (track 4)
- Ulf Kruckenberg – drum recording and engineering
- Ben Grosse – mixing
- Tom Baker – mastering
- Erik Laser – management
- Birgit Fordyce – management
- Stefan Mehnert – management
- Klaus Merz – photography
- Frank Dellé – featured artist (track 1)
- Merrill Beth Nisker – featured artist (track 2)
- Ian Fraser Kilmister – featured artist (track 3)
- Brian Hugh Warner – featured artist (track 4)
- Jonathan Davis – featured artist (track 11)

== Charts ==
| Chart (2014) | Peak position |
|---|---|
| Austrian Albums (Ö3 Austria) | 55 |
| Belgian Albums (Ultratop Flanders) | 193 |
| Belgian Albums (Ultratop Wallonia) | 170 |
| French Albums (SNEP) | 119 |
| German Albums (Offizielle Top 100) | 28 |
| Swiss Albums (Schweizer Hitparade) | 30 |
| UK Rock & Metal Albums (OCC) | 15 |
