= Candy Carol =

Studio album by Book of Love
- Released: 23 January 1991
- Recorded: 1989, 1990 at Chung King House of Metal, NYC; The Hit Factory, NYC; Unique Recording, NYC
- Genres: New wave, synth-pop
- Length: 34:56; 59:05 (2009 reissue)
- Label: Sire
- Producers: Ted Ottaviano & Ben Grosse

Book of Love chronology
| Lullaby (1988) | Candy Carol (1991) | Lovebubble (1993) |

Singles from Candy Carol
- 1. "Alice Everyday" Released: 18 January 1991; 2. "Sunny Day" Released: 20 April 1991; 3. "Counting The Rosaries" Released: 7 November 1991

Professional ratings
Review scores
| Source | Rating |
|---|---|
| AllMusic | 3/5 stars |
| Entertainment Weekly | A− |
| PopMatters | 6/10 stars |

Candy Carol is the third studio album by American synth-pop band Book of Love, released on January 23, 1991, by Sire Records.

== History ==
Book of Love released their third record two years following their moderately successful album, Lullaby. After having substantial success on college radio stations and the dancefloor in the eighties, Candy Carol was released amidst the changing musical landscape of the early nineties. In a 2009 interview, Lauren Roselli Johnson stated, "I think we had great momentum going from Book of Love to Lullaby. Then, after the eighties were gone and the nineties arrived with a very heavy shift in [music] genres, production became valued-or not. There was hip hop, grunge, and house music. I think we fit in less and less with that stuff. It was kind of the beginning of the end of our story."

The songs for Candy Carol were written and recorded in 1989 and 1990, and were "musically based on the late-60s pop idiom". The band's intent was to record a modern album recreating the style of late-'60s pop. Explaining the meaning of Candy Carol, Ted Ottaviano stated, "To me, Candy Carol represents melody. The purity of melody is something that can give you a good feeling the way a Christmas carol can. I don't think there is anything religious about the songs on the album. But, they are inspired by the idea and feeling of a carol. I am inspired by carols the same way I would be inspired by a Renaissance or Byzantine painting."

The band spent time recording the album at three different studios in New York City with Ted Ottaviano co-producing the record with Ben Grosse. Lauren Roselli, for the first time, contributed creatively as a songwriter, and co-wrote two songs, "Flower Parade" and "Counting The Rosaries". For the two tracks, she also took on lead vocal duties for the first time. In a 2009 interview, Lauren Roselli Johnson stated, "Ted really nurtured me and shared his process with me openly. In return, I always respected and tried to help him to hear out his vision. I think at that point, I was ready and wanted to write. Ted encouraged it and facilitated it." For recording of the album track "Turn The World", Book of Love invited thirty of their friends to the recording studio to be the singing choir in the chorus of the song. Another album track titled "Wall Song", a semi-instrumental piece, was inspired by the breakdown of the Berlin Wall, and features spoken word sections of Jade Lee reading a German version of the poem "Autumn" by Austrian poet Rainer Maria Rilke.

Recording sessions with co-producer Ben Grosse began January 15, 1990, at Chung King House of Metal, where the band laid down basic tracks for a month and a half. After the taking a break in early March to pursue individual projects, they reconvened on April 16, 1990 at The Hit Factory to record vocals until mid-May. From there, the band moved to Unique Recording Studios to record overdubs, and finishing the recording of the album on June 8, 1990. In July, the album was mixed at Pearl Sound, Detroit, MI. by Ted Ottaviano and Ben Grosse, and then finally mastered at Sterling Sound.

Candy Carol was originally scheduled to be released on October 15, 1990. The band had hoped to have the album out well before Christmas, so as not to compete with holiday releases. The remixing of "Alice Everyday" took producer Ben Grosse a couple extra weeks, causing the label to push the release back. The band decided to delay the release until the new year so that it would receive full support from the label. On the subject, Ted Ottaviano stated, "At first it really upset us because we were anticipating the release of it for almost two and a half years. But as January approached, it was obvious that it was the best thing to do because you don't get the attention you deserve when you're a smaller band."

The first single taken from the record was "Alice Everyday", released prior to the album in January 1991, and features sing-song vocals and a refrain consisting of a laundry list of girls' names. The title of the song "Alice Everyday" is an actual real name of a woman from the 1800s that Ted Ottaviano came across while collecting girls names in a notebook. In the dance clubs, the song was a moderate hit, and made it to no. 21 on the Hot Dance Club Play Chart, spending nine weeks on the chart. A promotional video was shot and released for "Alice Everyday" by director Rocky Schenck. There are two versions of the video, one that uses the album version of "Alice Everyday" and the other, the 'Everyday Glo Mix' version of the song. The video emulates the Candy Carol album cover, showing the band dancing and performing inside of snow globes, wearing outfits similar to the album cover.

Book of Love's third album Candy Carol was finally released on January 23, 1991 with twelve tracks, and sold 60,000 copies in the first week of release. The album spent four weeks on the Billboard 200, peaking at No. 174, the second best placing of their career. The album sleeve, designed by Jade Lee and photographed by Marc David Cohen, is of a crafted snow globe with miniatures of the band members performing amid falling snowflakes. The band continued their tradition of using Roman numerals to denote the year of the release. This time, the design used the lower case letters mcmxci (1991) and appeared inside on the record sleeve insert and the cassette and CD booklets.

The second single taken from the album was "Sunny Day", with its sun-kissed guitars, bells, and arpeggiated harps. It became the second Book of Love song to feature Ted Ottaviano on lead vocals. The single from the album that failed to make the Billboard charts but was featured in Jonathan Demme's 1991 film, The Silence of the Lambs. In a strange twist of fate, Lauren Roselli was cast in the role of Stacy Hubka in the movie. In a 2009 interview, Lauren Roselli Johnson explained, "We were working on Candy Carol while Jonathan was working on Silence [of the Lambs]. I played him a rough mix of the record and I think he liked "Sunny Day" and felt he could use it somewhere in the film."

The third and final single from the album was "Counting The Rosaries", featuring Lauren Roselli on lead vocals, a whistling section, and Marc Roselli, a Jesuit priest and brother to Lauren Roselli, singing the Sanctus from a Mass on the track. The song failed to make an impact on the charts.

To promote Candy Carol, the band headlined their own Candy Carol Tour of small clubs in the spring of 1991 with various local acts opening in each city. The band's U.S. tour lasted for three months, with dates spanning March 2nd through June 1st of 1991.

The album track "Quiver" was later remixed by Boris Granich and included on the single for 1993's "Boy Pop" as the 'Extended Mix'.

Reflecting on the album in 2009, Ted Ottaviano stated, "Something was happening. My vocabulary wasn't connecting with people. On the surface, Candy Carol is a very candy-coated album, but the songs are lyrically coming from dark places. They were these little, idiosyncratic operettas that were a bit of a disconnect with fans and even with us. It's like that line from 'Cabaret': 'If you could see it through my eyes.' Well, if you could hear Candy Carol through my ears..." Lauren Roselli Johnson stated, "With Candy Carol, we had really crafted our sound and palette, but music had changed so much. We had gone back to writing and crafting the three-minute pop song, and people didn't care about that then. I remember feeling so sad at our shows because people seemed to have moved on. I still feel that some of our best moments are on Candy Carol. After that, we probably should've stopped, as we were not into the same things musically. I think we could have had a bigger spot in the history of pop music, but we might have been a little too ahead of the curve. And timing is everything."

In 2009, Candy Carol was remastered and reissued by Collector's Choice/Noble Rot Records. The reissue featured four rare bonus remixes: "Alice Everyday" (Everyday Glo Mix), "Alice Everyday" (Sam The Butcher Mix) which samples The Brady Bunch and Nitzer Ebb; "Sunny Day" (Single Remix), and "Counting The Rosaries" (Happiness and Love Mix).

== Release and reception ==
Candy Carol was released on January 16, 1991, with twelve tracks in all three formats of CD, LP, and cassette. Candy Carol spent four weeks on the Billboard 200, peaking at No. 174, the second best placing of their career. Three singles were culled from the album: "Alice Everyday", "Sunny Day", and "Counting The Rosaries" in 1991.

Entertainment Weekly's Chuck Eddy gave the album an A−, stating that its "electronic soda-pop sound is wonderful enough to put over its innocent lyrical wonder. Exquisitely layered pre-hippie harmonies quote old soul and doo-wop classics (and even Christmas hymns). Ted Ottavino's computerized keyboards realign succulent '60s melodies into dance-floor-ready '90s hooks..."

AllMusic's Brian Mansfield compared the album to "an aural trip to the candy shop. The arrangements, especially on "Turn the World" and "Quiver," sound like some sort of electro-pop Christmas album. These pop confectioners have always used sweetness and innocence in their recipe, but never has it sounded so sugary."

Reviewing the 2009 reissue, PopMatters' Christel Loar gave Candy Carol a 6/10 and stated, "If Book of Love represents the band’s masterwork and Lullaby is the apex of its chart success, then 1991’s Candy Carol was its psychedelic period."

== Track listing ==
| No. | Title | Writer(s) | Length |
|---|---|---|---|
| 1. | "Intro" | Theodore Ottaviano | 1:12 |
| 2. | "Turn The World" | Theodore Ottaviano | 3:47 |
| 3. | "Quiver" | S. Ottaviano/T. Ottaviano | 3:27 |
| 4. | "Butterfly" | S. Ottaviano/T. Ottaviano | 2:09 |
| 5. | "Sunny Day" | Theodore Ottaviano | 3:40 |
| 6. | "Flower Parade" | L. Roselli/T. Ottaviano | 0:42 |
| 7. | "Wall Song" | Theodore Ottaviano | 2:40 |
| 8. | "Alice Everyday" | Theodore Ottaviano | 3:40 |
| 9. | "Counting The Rosaries" | L. Roselli/T. Ottaviano | 3:40 |
| 10. | "Miss Melancholy" | S. Ottaviano/T. Ottaviano | 3:23 |
| 11. | "Orange Flip" | S. Ottaviano/T. Ottaviano | 3:00 |
| 12. | "Candy Carol" | Theodore Ottaviano | 3:09 |

Bonus tracks on 2009 CD reissue
| No. | Title | Writer(s) | Length |
|---|---|---|---|
| 13. | "Alice Everyday (Everyday Glo Mix)" | Theodore Ottaviano | 6:46 |
| 14. | "Alice Everyday (Sam The Butcher Mix)" | Theodore Ottaviano | 7:18 |
| 15. | "Sunny Day (Single Remix)" | Theodore Ottaviano | 3:50 |
| 16. | "Counting The Rosaries (Happiness and Love Mix)" | L. Roselli/T. Ottaviano | 6:17 |

== Personnel ==
- Lauren Roselli – keyboards, vocals (lead vocals on "Flower Parade" and "Counting The Rosaries")
- Ted Ottaviano – keyboards, programming, vocals (lead vocals on "Sunny Day")
- Susan Ottaviano – vocals
- Jade Lee – keyboards, percussion, vocals (spoken word on "Wall Song")

Additional personnel:

- Produced by Ted Ottaviano & Ben Grosse
- Mixed by Ben Grosse
- Mastered by Jose Rodriguez at Sterling Sound
- Engineered by Richard Joseph and Tom Fritze
- Assistant Engineers: Ken Quarterone, Warren Shaw, and Matt King
- Recorded at Unique Recording, The Hit Factory, and the Chung King House of Metal, NYC
- Mixed at Pearl Sound, Detroit
- Art Direction and Design: Jade Lee
- Cover Photographed by Marc David Cohen
- Book Of Love photographed by Janette Beckman
- Clothing by Jeffrey Costello
- Management: Steve Wax/Gary Kief
- Guitar solo on "Turn The World" by Richard Joseph
- Chorus on "Turn The World" by friends of Book of Love
- Guitars on "Sunny Day" and "Candy Carol" by Ray Carroll
- Sanctus on "Counting The Rosaries" sung by Marc Roselli, S.J.
- Marching drum on "Intro" and "Candy Carol" by Tony Drootin

Reissue credits:

- Reissue Executive Producer: Gordon Anderson
- Liner Notes: Michael Paoletta
- Mastered by: Bob Fisher
- Thanks to: Mark Pinkus and Dave Kapp
- Management: Michael Pagnotta for Reach Media

== Chart positions ==
=== Album ===
| Year | Chart | Peak position | Total weeks |
|---|---|---|---|
| 1991 | U.S. Billboard 200 | 174 | 4 |

=== Singles ===
| Year | Song | Chart peak positions |
| Year | Song | US Club Play |
|---|---|---|
| 1991 | "Alice Everyday" | 21 |
| 1991 | "Sunny Day" | — |
| 1991 | "Counting The Rosaries" | — |

"—" denotes a release that did not chart.
