= Boy Pop =

Single by Book of Love

from the album Lovebubble
- B-side: "Quiver" (Extended Mix)
- Released: 6 May 1993
- Recorded: 1992–1993
- Genre: Synthpop, new wave
- Length: 4:05 (album version); 3:40 (radio mix)
- Label: Sire
- Songwriters: Lauren Roselli; Ted Ottaviano
- Producer: Ted Ottaviano

Book of Love singles chronology
"Counting The Rosaries" (1991)	"Boy Pop" (1993)	"Hunny Hunny/Chatterbox (Pt. 2)" (1993)

Music video
- Boy Pop on YouTube

"Boy Pop" is the eleventh single released by the American synthpop band Book of Love. The song was released on May 6, 1993, by Sire Records, as the first single from the band's fourth album, Lovebubble (1993).

"Boy Pop" was written by band members Lauren Roselli and Ted Ottaviano. The song is a dance anthem, and an ode to gay men, with its lyric of "Brother love... Across the nation... On the bottom or the top, when we go, we go pop... Boys united cannot be divided...". Although the song did not chart on the US Billboard Hot 100, the song became a huge club hit, peaking at no. 4 on the Billboard Hot Dance Club Play chart, spending twelve weeks on the chart and becoming the band's second biggest dance club hit.

The song features a sample of Ted Ottaviano singing "Boy Pop", a rap by Ron Malloy, and Lauren Roselli and Jade Lee singing "brother love, across the nation". The track was remixed into six different remixes for the release, with two remixes by Josh Wink and the other four by Mood II Swing. An extended remix of "Quiver", a track from the band's previous album Candy Carol, was also included on the single, and was remixed by Boris Granich.

A promotional video was shot showing the band at a club/bar and many dancing muscular fit men. (See External links below for video)

== Track listings ==
=== 1993 12" Maxi-Single (Sire Records 9 40806-0) ===
Side A:

1. "Boy Pop" (Extended Radio Mix) - 4:33
2. "Boy Pop" (Go Bottom Go Top Mix) - 7:35
3. "Boy Pop" (Swinging Boy Pop Mix) - 3:38

Side B:

1. "Boy Pop" (WinKing Breakbeat Trance) - 6:28
2. "Boy Pop" (The Deeper X Dub) - 7:00
3. "Quiver" (Extended Mix) - 5:21

=== 1993 CD Maxi-Single (Sire Records 9 40806-2) ===
1. "Boy Pop" (Album Version) - 4:05
2. "Boy Pop" (Extended Radio Mix) - 4:33
3. "Boy Pop" (WinKing Breakbeat Trance Mix) - 6:28
4. "Quiver" (Extended Mix) - 6:20
5. "Boy Pop" (Go Bottom Go Top Mix) - 7:35
6. "Boy Pop" (Swinging Boy Pop Mix) - 3:48
7. "Boy Pop" (The Deeper X Dub) - 7:00
8. "Boy Pop" (Radio Mix) - 3:40

=== 1993 Promo 12" Single (Sire Records SAM 1197) ===
Side A:

1. "Boy Pop" (WinKing Breakbeat Trance Mix) - 6:28

Side B:

1. "Boy Pop" (Go Bottom Go Top Mix) - 7:35
2. "Boy Pop" (The Deeper X Dub) - 7:00

== Personnel ==
"Boy Pop" written by Lauren Roselli and Ted Ottaviano. "Quiver" written by Susan Ottaviano and Ted Ottaviano. All instruments arranged, programmed, and performed by Book of Love.

- Lauren Roselli - Keyboards, backing vocals
- Ted Ottaviano - Keyboards, backing vocals
- Jade Lee - Keyboards, Percussion, backing vocals
- Susan Ottaviano - Vocals

Credits

- Produced by Ted Ottaviano.
- Rap by Ron Malloy.
- Additional production and remix on "Boy Pop" (WinKing Breakbeat Trance Mix) and "Boy Pop" (Radio Mix) by Josh Wink for WinKing Prod/MCT.
  Engineered by John Wicks at 3rd Story Recording Studios, Philadelphia, PA.
- "Boy Pop" (Extended Radio Mix), "Boy Pop" (Go Bottom Go Top Mix), "Boy Pop" (Swinging Boy Pop Mix), and "Boy Pop" (The Deeper X Dub) rebuilt by Mood II Swing Productions for Gregory Ruben Entertainment, Inc.
  Recorded and engineered by Steve Barkan for 23 West Entertainment.
- "Quiver" Produced by Ted Ottaviano and Ben Grosse.
- Remix and additional production on "Quiver" (Extended Mix) by Boris Granich for Powermix Productions.
- Photos by Jayne Wexler, assisted by Laura Stojanovic.

== Charts ==
Chart (1993)	Peak position
US Dance Club Play (Billboard)	4
US Maxi-Singles Sales (Billboard)	22

== Official versions ==
Year	Version	Length	Mixed/Remixed by	Comment
1993	Album version	4:05	Michael Hutchinson	Found on the CD maxi-single (Sire Records 9 40806-2), and all formats of the album Lovebubble.*
1993	Radio Mix	3:40	Josh Wink	Found only on the CD maxi-single (Sire Records 9 40806-2).
1993	Extended Radio Mix	4:33	Mood II Swing	Found only on the CD maxi-single (Sire Records 9 40806-2).
1993	WinKing Breakbeat Trance Mix	6:28	Josh Wink	Found on the promo 12" vinyl (Sire Records SAM 1197), the 12" vinyl maxi-single (Sire Records 9 40806-0), and the CD maxi-single (Sire Records 9 40806-2).
1993	Go Bottom Go Top Mix	7:35	Mood II Swing	Found on the promo 12" vinyl (Sire Records SAM 1197), the 12" vinyl maxi-single (Sire Records 9 40806-0), CD maxi-single (Sire Records 9 40806-2), and the 2009 CD reissue of Lovebubble (Noble Rot).
1993	Swinging Boy Pop Mix	3:48	Mood II Swing	Found on the 12" vinyl maxi-single (Sire Records 9 40806-0), the CD maxi-single (Sire Records 9 40806-2), and the 2009 CD reissue of Lovebubble (Noble Rot).
1993	The Deeper X Dub	7:00	Mood II Swing	Found on the promo 12" vinyl (Sire Records SAM 1197), the 12" vinyl maxi-single (Sire Records 9 40806-0), and the CD maxi-single (Sire Records 9 40806-2).

" * " denotes that version is available as digital download
