= A Million Degrees =

Studio album by Emigrate
- Released: 30 November 2018
- Studios: Studio Engine 55 (Berlin, Germany)
- Genres: Industrial metal; alternative metal; electronic rock
- Length: 45:19
- Label: Vertigo
- Producer: Emigrate

Emigrate chronology
Silent So Long (2014)	A Million Degrees (2018)	The Persistence of Memory (2021)

Professional ratings
Review scores
Source	Rating
AllMusic	4/5 stars

A Million Degrees is the third studio album by the industrial rock band Emigrate. It was released on November 30, 2018, via Vertigo Records. First recorded in 2015, the album was destroyed in a flood in 2017, and had to be re-recorded. Recording sessions took place at Studio Engine 55 in Berlin with drums recorded at Funkhaus Studio. It features guest appearances from Ben Kowalewicz, Cardinal Copia, Margaux Bossieux and Till Lindemann.

Frontman Richard Kruspe's equipment included ESP Guitars, Mesa Boogie Rectifier amps, Pro Tools and Native Instruments.

Music videos for "1234" and "You Are So Beautiful" were shot in Los Angeles directed by Bill Yukich and released on October 18 and November 30, 2018, respectively. The video for "War" was directed by David Gesslbauer and released on March 5, 2019.

== Track listing ==
All music is composed by Richard Kruspe, except track 4 (composed with Margaux Bossieux).

No.	Title	Lyrics	Length
1.	"War"	Richard Kruspe; Terry Matlin	4:34
2.	"1234" (featuring Ben Kowalewicz Ian D'sa)	Richard Kruspe; Terry Matlin	3:23
3.	"A Million Degrees"	Richard Kruspe; Terry Matlin	4:02
4.	"Lead You On" (featuring Margaux Bossieux)	Richard Kruspe; Margaux Bossieux	4:10
5.	"You Are So Beautiful"	Richard Kruspe; Thomas Borman	4:10
6.	"Hide and Seek"	Richard Kruspe; Terry Matlin	2:50
7.	"We Are Together"	Richard Kruspe; Terry Matlin	6:00
8.	"Let's Go" (featuring Till Lindemann)	Richard Kruspe; Till Lindemann	4:11
9.	"I'm Not Afraid" (featuring Cardinal Copia)	Richard Kruspe; Terry Matlin	4:34
10.	"Spitfire"	Richard Kruspe; Terry Matlin	2:32
11.	"Eyes Fade Away"	Richard Kruspe; Terry Matlin	4:52
Total length:			45:19

== Personnel ==
- Richard Kruspe – guitars, vocals, keyboards, electro sequencer, lyrics
- Terry Matlin – lyrics
- Thomas Borman – lyrics (track 5)
- Till Lindemann – lyrics & vocals (track 8)
- Margaux Bossieux – lyrics & vocals (track 4), backing vocals
- Olsen Involtini – vocal recording & production, drum recording & engineering, backing vocals
- Tom Dalgety – vocal recording (track 9)
- Sky van Hoff – additional guitar recording & production, bass, mixing
- Sascha Moser – drum editing
- Possi Possberg – drum tuning
- Arnaud Giroux – backing vocals, bass
- Meral Al Me – backing vocals
- Kriss Jacob – backing vocals
- Steve Binetti – additional solo guitar (tracks: 1, 11)
- Mikko Sirén – drums
- Svante Forsbäck – mastering
- Benjamin Kowalewicz – vocals (track 2)
- Tobias Forge – vocals (track 9)
- Sven Kaselow – management
- Birgit Fordyce – management
- Stefan Mehnert – management
- Büro Dirk Rodolph – artwork
- Gregor Hohenberg – photography
- Anthony Kurtz – photography

== Charts ==
Chart (2018)	Peak position
Austrian Albums (Ö3 Austria)	70
Belgian Albums (Ultratop Flanders)	133
French Albums (SNEP)	195
German Albums (Offizielle Top 100)	30
Swiss Albums (Schweizer Hitparade)	38
UK Rock & Metal Albums (Official Charts)	6
