= Alice Everyday =

Single by Book of Love

from the album Candy Carol
- B-side: "Candy Carol"
- Released: 18 January 1991
- Recorded: 1989–1990
- Genre: Synth-pop, new wave
- Length: 3:40 (album version)
- Label: Sire Records
- Songwriter: Theodore Ottaviano
- Producers: Ted Ottaviano and Ben Grosse

Book of Love singles chronology
"Witchcraft" (1989)	"Alice Everyday" (1991)	"Sunny Day" (1991)

Music video
- Alice Everyday on MTV.com

Music video
- Alice Everyday (Everyday-Glo Mix) on YouTube

Alternate cover
- 12" vinyl Maxi-Single sleeve

"Alice Everyday" is the eighth single released by the American synth-pop band Book of Love. The song was released prior to the band's third album, 1991's Candy Carol, as the first single.

"Alice Everyday" was released to radio in the fall of 1990 and features sing-song lyrics and a refrain consisting of a laundry list of girls' names. In the dance clubs, the song was a moderate hit, and made it to no. 21 on the Hot Dance Club Play chart, spending nine weeks on the chart.

The track was remixed for the 12" single and CD single into three different remixes by Ben Grosse, and was released in stores on Jan. 18, 1991. All three remixes were also edited down into single mixes and released on the promo CD. "Alice Everyday" (Sam The Butcher Mix) contains samples from The Brady Bunch TV series, a drumbeat sample from Nitzer Ebb's "Let Your Body Learn", and other industrial music samples.

Also appearing on the single are the album version of title track "Candy Carol" and a 1990 remix by Ben Grosse of "With A Little Love", a song originally on the band's previous album, 1988's Lullaby.

A promotional video was shot and released for "Alice Everyday" by director Rocky Schenck. There are two versions of the video; one that uses the album version of "Alice Everyday" and the other, the 'Everyday-Glo Mix' version of the song. The video emulates the Candy Carol album cover, with the band dancing and performing inside of snow globes and wearing outfits similar to the album cover.

== Track listings ==
=== 1990 12" Maxi-Single (Sire Records 9 21767-0) ===
Side A:

1. "Alice Everyday" (Everyday-Glo Mix) - 6:45
2. "Alice Everyday" (Sunshine Day Mix) - 7:33
3. "With A Little Love" (1990 Version) - 3:17

Side B:

1. "Alice Everyday" (Sam The Butcher Mix) - 7:16
2. "Candy Carol" (Album Version) - 3:11

=== 1990 CD Maxi-Single (Sire Records 9 21767-2) ===
1. "Alice Everyday" (Album Version) - 3:40
2. "Alice Everyday" (Everyday-Glo Mix) - 6:45
3. "With A Little Love" (1990 Version) - 3:17
4. "Alice Everyday" (Sam The Butcher Mix) - 7:16
5. "Alice Everyday" (Sunshine Day Mix) - 7:33
6. "Candy Carol" (Album Version) - 3:11

=== 1990 Promo CD Single (Sire Records PRO-CD-4479) ===
1. "Alice Everyday" (Album Version) - 3:41
2. "Alice Everyday" (Everyday-Glo Single Mix) - 4:06
3. "Alice Everyday" (Sam The Butcher Single Mix) - 3:59
4. "Alice Everyday" (Sunshine Day Single Mix) - 4:04

== Personnel ==
"Alice Everyday" and "Candy Carol" written by Theodore Ottaviano. All instruments arranged, programmed, and performed by Book of Love.

- Susan Ottaviano - Lead vocals
- Ted Ottaviano - Keyboards, backing vocals
- Lauren Roselli - Keyboards, backing vocals
- Jade Lee - Keyboards, backing vocals

Credits

- Produced by Ted Ottaviano and Ben Grosse.
- Remix and Postproduction on 'Everyday-Glo Mix', 'Sam The Butcher Mix', 'Sunshine Day Mix' and single remix versions by Ben Grosse.
- Programming on 'Everyday-Glo Mix', 'Sam The Butcher Mix', 'Sunshine Day Mix' and single remix versions by Ben Grosse, John Vitale, David Klinger, Mark Bass.
- Assistant Engineers on 'Everyday-Glo Mix', 'Sam The Butcher Mix', 'Sunshine Day Mix' and single remix versions: Matt King, Walter Balfour.
- 'Everyday-Glo Mix', 'Sam The Butcher Mix', 'Sunshine Day Mix' and single remix versions mixed at Pearl Sound Studios/Canton, MI.
- "With A Little Love" (1990 Version) remixed by Ben Grosse at The Hit Factory, Times Square, NYC. Assisted by Tom Fritze.

== Charts ==
Chart (1991)	Peak position
US Hot Dance Club Play (Billboard)	21
US Cash Box Top 100	85

== Official versions ==
Year	Version	Length	Mixed/Remixed by	Comment
1991	Album version	3:40	Ben Grosse	Found on the CD maxi-single (Sire Records 9 21767-2), and all formats of the album Candy Carol.*
1991	Everyday-Glo Single Mix	4:06	Ben Grosse	A short edit of the 'Everyday-Glo Mix'. Found exclusively on the 1990 promo CD single (Sire Records PRO-CD-4479).
1991	Everyday-Glo Mix	6:45	Ben Grosse	Found on the 12" vinyl maxi-single (Sire Records 9 21767-0), the CD single (Sire Records 9 21767-2), and the 2009 reissue CD of Candy Carol (Noble Rot).
1991	Sam The Butcher Single Mix	3:59	Ben Grosse	A short edit of the 'Sam The Butcher Mix'. Found exclusively on the 1990 promo CD single (Sire Records PRO-CD-4479).
1991	Sam The Butcher Mix	7:16	Ben Grosse	Found on the 12" vinyl maxi-single (Sire Records 9 21767-0), the CD single (Sire Records 9 21767-2), and the 2009 reissue CD of Candy Carol (Noble Rot).
1991	Sunshine Day Single Mix	4:04	Ben Grosse	A short edit of the 'Sunshine Day Mix'. Found exclusively on the 1990 promo CD single (Sire Records PRO-CD-4479).
1991	Sunshine Day Mix	7:33	Ben Grosse	Found on the 12" vinyl maxi-single (Sire Records 9 21767-0) and CD single (Sire Records 9 21767-2).

" * " denotes that version is available as digital download
