= Emigrate (album) =

Studio album by Emigrate
- Released: August 31, 2007 (Europe)
- Studio: Puk Recording Studios (Kærby, Denmark)
- Genre: Industrial metal; alternative metal
- Length: 44:38
- Label: Motor Music
- Producer: Richard Kruspe; Jacob Hellner (co.); Olsen Involtini (co.); Arnaud Giroux (co.)

Emigrate chronology
Emigrate (2007)	Silent So Long (2014)

Singles from Emigrate
- 1. "New York City" Released: October 8, 2007; 2. "Temptation" Released: March 7, 2008

Professional ratings
Review scores
Source	Rating
AllMusic	3.5/5 stars

Emigrate is the debut studio album by the industrial rock band Emigrate. It was released on August 31, 2007 in Europe and on January 29, 2008 in the United States and in Australia via Motor Music. Recording sessions took place at Puk Recording Studios in Denmark. Production was handled by Richard Kruspe with Jacob Hellner, Arnaud Giroux and Olsen Involtini.

== Track listing ==
All lyrics are written by Richard Kruspe and Caron Bernstein; all music is composed by Richard Kruspe.

No.	Title	Length
1.	"Emigrate"	4:07
2.	"Wake Up"	3:37
3.	"My World"	4:18
4.	"Let Me Break"	3:35
5.	"In My Tears"	4:34
6.	"Babe"	4:37
7.	"New York City"	3:28
8.	"Resolution"	3:42
9.	"Temptation"	4:13
10.	"This Is What"	4:38
11.	"You Can't Get Enough"	4:03
Total length:		44:38

Limited edition bonus tracks
No.	Title	Length
12.	"Blood"	3:34
13.	"Help Me"	3:15
Total length:		51:27

== Personnel ==
- Richard Kruspe – lyrics, guitars, vocals, producer
- Caron Bernstein – lyrics
- Margaux Bossieux – backing vocals (tracks: 2, 3, 6, 7, 9)
- Grace Risch – backing vocals (track 11)
- Ruth Renner – backing vocals (track 11)
- Arnaud Giroux – bass, vocal recording and production, co-producer
- Olsen Involtini – additional guitar, vocal recording and production, co-producer
- Henka Johansson – drums
- Sascha Moser – programming (Logic and Pro Tools)
- Ulf Kruckenberg – drum engineering
- Jacob Hellner – co-producer
- Stefan Glaumann – mixing
- Howie Weinberg – mastering
- Dirk Rudolph – design
- Felix Broede – photography

== Charts ==
Chart (2007)	Peak position
Austrian Albums (Ö3 Austria)	28
Belgian Albums (Ultratop Wallonia)	65
Dutch Albums (Album Top 100)	59
Finnish Albums (Suomen virallinen lista)	29
French Albums (SNEP)	41
German Albums (Offizielle Top 100)	8
Swedish Albums (Sverigetopplistan)	47
Swiss Albums (Schweizer Hitparade)	18
UK Rock & Metal Albums (OCC)	7
UK Independent Albums (OCC)	12
