= Sunny Day (song) =

Single by Book of Love

from the album Candy Carol
- Released: 20 April 1991
- Recorded: 1989–1990
- Genre: Synthpop, new wave
- Length: 3:40 (album version); 3:48 (single version)
- Label: Sire Records
- Songwriter: Theodore Ottaviano
- Producers: Ted Ottaviano and Ben Grosse

Book of Love singles chronology
"Alice Everyday" (1991)	"Sunny Day" (1991)	"Counting The Rosaries" (1991)

"Sunny Day" is the ninth single released by the American synthpop band Book of Love. The song was released as the second single from the band's third album, 1991's Candy Carol.

"Sunny Day" was written by band member Ted Ottaviano, who also sings the lead vocals on the track. It became the second Book of Love song to feature him on lead vocals. The single was featured in Jonathan Demme's 1991 film, The Silence of the Lambs. In a strange twist of fate, band member Lauren Roselli was cast in the role of Stacy Hubka in the movie.

"We were working on Candy Carol while Jonathan was working on Silence [of the Lambs]. I played him a rough mix of the record and I think he liked "Sunny Day" and felt he could use it somewhere in the film." -Lauren Roselli Johnson, 2009

The song was initially remixed by Ben Grosse and released as a CD promo single and cassette single. Shortly thereafter, the band themselves remixed the track, and this remix appeared on their following single "Counting The Rosaries", the CD maxi-single edition of which also included the Ben Grosse remix.

"Sunny Day" was reworked in 1993 for Ted Ottaviano's post Book of Love project with Basil Lucas, Doubleplusgood. The 1993 version, found on Sire's 1993 compilation, New Faces, features Lambert Moss on vocals and is more of a dance oriented track.

In 2001, "Sunny Day" was once again re-recorded as a new version, for the band's best of compilation, I Touch Roses: The Best of Book of Love. The 2001 version of "Sunny Day" featured Lori Lindsay on guitar, who would later become the lead vocalist of The Myrmidons, Ted Ottaviano and Lauren Roselli's band formed in the mid-2000s.

== Track listings ==
=== 1991 Promo CD Single (Sire Records PRO-CD-4805) ===
1. "Sunny Day" (Remix) - 3:51

=== 1991 "Counting The Rosaries"/"Sunny Day" CD Maxi-Single (Sire Records 9 40240-2) ===
1. "Counting The Rosaries" (Partial Confession Mix) - 4:11
2. "Counting The Rosaries" (Full Confession Mix) - 7:58
3. "Counting The Rosaries" (Happiness & Love Mix) - 6:17
4. "Sunny Day" (Heal Your Positive Body Mix) - 6:04
5. "Counting The Rosaries" (Crying Angels Mix) - 5:03
6. "Counting The Rosaries" (Album Version) - 3:32
7. "Sunny Day" (Single Remix) - 3:48

=== 1991 "Counting The Rosaries"/"Sunny Day" 12" Maxi-Single (Sire Records 9 40240-0) ===
Side A:

1. "Counting The Rosaries" (Full Confession Mix) - 7:58
2. "Counting The Rosaries" (Full Confession Dub) - 5:53

Side B:

1. "Counting The Rosaries" (Happiness & Love Mix) - 6:17
2. "Counting The Rosaries" (Crying Angels Mix) - 5:03
3. "Sunny Day" (Heal Your Positive Body Mix) - 6:04

== Personnel ==
"Sunny Day" written by Theodore Ottaviano. "Counting The Rosaries" written by Lauren Roselli and Ted Ottaviano. All instruments arranged, programmed, and performed by Book of Love.

- Ted Ottaviano - Keyboards, backing vocals (lead vocals on "Sunny Day")
- Lauren Roselli - Keyboards, backing vocals (lead vocals on "Counting The Rosaries")
- Jade Lee - Keyboards, Percussion, backing vocals
- Susan Ottaviano - backing vocals

Credits

- Produced by Ted Ottaviano and Ben Grosse.
- "Sunny Day" (Single Remix) remixed by Ben Grosse
- "Sunny Day" (Heal Your Positive Body Mix) remixed by Book of Love
- Guitars on "Sunny Day" by Ray Carroll
- Remix and additional production on 'Partial Confession Mix', 'Full Confession Mix', and 'Full Confession Dub' by Ben Grosse;
  Programming by John Vitale and Ben Grosse;
  Assisted by Matt King and Walter Balfour
- Post production and remix on 'Happiness & Love Mix' and 'Crying Angels Mix' by Bill Coleman for Peace Bisquit Productions;
  Engineer: Heinrich Zwahlen @ Spike Recording, NYC
- 'Happiness & Love Mix' features Leslie Winer;
  Leslie Winer appears courtesy of Rhythm King Records, UK
- Sanctus on "Counting The Rosaries" sung by Marc Roselli, S.J.

== Official versions ==
Year	Version	Length	Mixed/Remixed by	Comment
1991	Album version	3:40	Ben Grosse	Found on all formats of the album Candy Carol.*
1991	Single Remix	3:48	Ben Grosse	Found on the cassette single, promo CD single (Sire Records PRO-CD-4805), and the "Counting The Rosaries" CD single (Sire Records 9 40240-2).
1991	Heal Your Positive Body Mix	6:04	Book of Love	Found on both the "Counting The Rosaries" 12" vinyl single (Sire Records 9 40240-0) and CD single (Sire Records Sire Records 9 40240-2).
1993	Doubleplusgood version	4:08	Ted Ottaviano	New version by Ted Ottaviano's Doubleplusgood project with vocals by Lambert Moss. Found exclusively on the Sire/Warner Bros. 1993 CD compilation New Faces (Sire Records 9 45320-2).
2001	2001 Version	3:25	Ben Grosse; Ted Ottaviano	Found exclusively on the CD version of I Touch Roses: The Best of Book of Love.*

" * " denotes that version is available as digital download
