= New York City (Emigrate song) =

2007 single by Emigrate

Single by Emigrate

from the album Emigrate
- B-side: "Blood, My World"
- Released: October 12, 2007
- Genre: Hard rock, alternative rock
- Length: 3.42
- Label: Motor Music
- Songwriter: Richard Kruspe

Emigrate singles chronology
"My World" (2007)	"New York City" (2007)	"Temptation" (2008)

"New York City" is a single by industrial metal band Emigrate. It has been considered the band's most successful song.

The promo version of the single has an alternative cover. The gas mask has a burning building instead of a woman reflected in lenses. In the music video to the song, band frontman Richard Kruspe can be seen walking through New York City and sitting down and singing.

Till Lindemann stated that Kruspe does "[an] incredible job at singing and makes the song perfect in every way, who would have known my fellow German guitarist would now be singing in great American dialect, I'm very proud of Rick".

== Track listing ==
=== CD single ===
1. New York City (Single Edit) – 3:26
2. Blood – 3:34
3. My World – 4:17
4. New York City (Eat Your Heart Out Remix by Alec Empire) – 3:49
5. My World ("Resident Evil: Extinction" Video) – 4:21

=== 7" vinyl single ===
1. New York City (Eat Your Heart Out Remix by Alec Empire) 3:49
2. My World 4:17

=== Promo ===
1. New York City (Single Edit) – 3:26
2. New York City (Eat Your Heart Out Remix by Alec Empire) – 3:49

== Release history ==
Country	Date	Format
Austria	October 12, 2007	Digital single
Germany	October 12, 2007	Digital single
Switzerland	October 12, 2007	Digital single
United Kingdom	October 15, 2007	Physical single
