= Sundowning (Sleep Token album) =

Studio album by Sleep Token
- Released: 21 November 2019
- Studios: G1 Productions (Wells); VADA Studios (Worcestershire)
- Genres: Alternative metal; post-metal; art pop; progressive metal
- Length: 54:37
- Label: Spinefarm
- Producer: George Lever

Sleep Token chronology
Two (2017)	Sundowning (2019)	This Place Will Become Your Tomb (2021)

Sundowning is the debut studio album by the anonymous English rock band Sleep Token. It was recorded at G1 Productions in Wells, Somerset, produced by George Lever, and released on 21 November 2019 as the band's first release on Spinefarm Records.

== Concept ==
Sundowning is the first of an album trilogy, preceding This Place Will Become Your Tomb (2021) and Take Me Back to Eden (2023).

Each track was given its own emblem and accompanying visualiser, all of which contributed to the lore of the album.

== Release ==
Alongside the announcement of Sleep Token joining Universal Music Group label Spinefarm Records in June 2019, they announced Sundowning and released the album's opener, "The Night Does Not Belong to God". More songs were released bi-weekly in tracklist sequence, which were posted on YouTube at the time of sunset in the United Kingdom.

On 20 June 2020, seven months after the album's initial release and the day of the summer solstice, Sleep Token issued a deluxe version of Sundowning containing four bonus tracks performed entirely on piano dubbed The Room Below. The four tracks consisted of a new version of "Blood Sport" (for which a music video was also released), a new track titled "Shelter", and cover versions of Billie Eilish's "When the Party's Over" and Whitney Houston's "I Wanna Dance with Somebody (Who Loves Me)".

On 20 March 2022, the vernal equinox, an instrumental version of the original 12-track album was released.

== Live performances ==
According to Setlist.fm, "The Offering" is the song performed live most times by the band; "Higher" is ranked third, with "The Night Does Not Belong to God" also in the top ten from Sundowning.

== Reception ==
Professional ratings
Review scores
Source	Rating
Distorted Sound	10/10
Kerrang!	4/5

=== Critical ===
Sundowning received critical acclaim from music critics. Distorted Sound magazine's Daniel Fella gave the album a perfect 10/10 rating, praising it for providing a "dense palette" featuring "sheer beauty". Fella claimed that Sundowning served as a "redefinition" of heavy music, praising various elements of the tracks therein and predicting that its release would lead to "a storm of well deserved success" for the band.

Reviewing the album for Kerrang!, Tom Shepherd gave Sundowning a rating of four out of five, writing that the record features "moments here to truly savour, and ideas and experiences that feel unique". Shepherd highlighted in particular the songs "The Offering", "Dark Signs" and "Drag Me Under", but also noted that "the continuous nature of this dark mood entwined with the group's slow-burning, listless pace does begin to drag across [the album's] 50-minute runtime".

At the end of 2019, Distorted Sound ranked Sundowning as the No. 2 album of the year, with Dan McHugh writing that "Sundowning has proved that [Sleep Token] are not just a flash in the pan with its spellbinding experimentation ... the combined product is a force to be reckoned with".

In January 2023, Metal Hammer included "Gods" and "The Offering" in its list of Sleep Token's ten best songs.

=== Commercial ===
The album did not initially chart, but would later register on the UK Albums Sales, Physical Albums and Vinyl Albums charts, as well as in Scotland, following a 2023 vinyl reissue.

== Track listing ==
All tracks are written by Vessel. While II is listed as a writer for some songs, that is referring to the drum tracks, which he wrote and performed..

Sundowning track listing
No.	Title	Length
1.	"The Night Does Not Belong to God"	5:03
2.	"The Offering"	5:49
3.	"Levitate"	4:58
4.	"Dark Signs"	4:28
5.	"Higher"	5:21
6.	"Take Aim"	3:39
7.	"Give"	3:56
8.	"Gods"	3:25
9.	"Sugar"	4:52
10.	"Say That You Will"	5:03
11.	"Drag Me Under"	3:56
12.	"Blood Sport"	4:07
Total length:		54:37

Deluxe version - from The Room Below
No.	Title	Writer(s)	Length
13.	"Blood Sport" (from the room below - acoustic version)		4:15
14.	"Shelter"		3:12
15.	"When the Party's Over" (Billie Eilish cover)	Finneas O'Connell	2:26
16.	"I Wanna Dance with Somebody (Who Loves Me)" (Whitney Houston cover)	George Merrill; Shannon Rubicam	2:49
Total length:			67:19

== Personnel ==
- Vessel – vocals, guitar, keyboards, piano
- II – drums
- George Lever – production, engineering, bass
- Jens Bogren – mastering

== Charts ==
Chart performance for Sundowning
Chart (2019–25)	Peak position
Scottish Albums (OCC)	45
Uk Album Downloads (OCC)	98
UK Albums Sales (OCC)	29
UK Rock & Metal Albums (OCC)	4

== Certifications ==
Certifications for Sundowning
Region	Certification	Certified units/sales
United Kingdom (BPI)	Silver	60,000^{‡}
^{‡} Sales+streaming figures based on certification alone.
