= Origin of the Storm =

Studio album by The Sorrow
- Released: February 27, 2009
- Genre: Melodic metalcore
- Length: 54:00
- Label: Drakkar Records
- Producer: Toni Meloni & The Sorrow

The Sorrow chronology
Blessings from a Blackened Sky (2007)	Origin of the Storm (2009)	The Sorrow (2010)

Origin of the Storm is the second full-length album by the Melodic metalcore band The Sorrow. It was released on February 27, 2009 through Drakkar Records.

The album was rated a seven out of ten by Metal.de.

== Track listing ==
No.	Title	Length
1.	"Apnoia"	1:36
2.	"Where Is the Sun?"	4:28
3.	"My Immortal Guardian"	4:24
4.	"Scars"	4:40
5.	"Eyes of Darkness"	5:29
6.	"Raising the Devil"	4:45
7.	"Anchor In the Storm"	5:24
8.	"From This Day On"	3:17
9.	"Heaven Is No Place for Us"	4:08
10.	"Tempestuous"	1:22
11.	"Collector of Tears"	4:24
12.	"Faceless"	5:09
13.	"Day of the Lord"	4:47
Total length:		54:00
