= Zunge (album) =

Studio album by Till Lindemann
- Released: 3 November 2023
- Recorded: 2021–2023, 2024–2025 (2025 edition bonus tracks)
- Genre: Neue Deutsche Härte
- Length: 46:27
- Language: German
- Labels: Self-released; Out of Line (digital, re-release)
- Producers: Sky van Hoff; Daniel Karelly; Olsen Involtini; Lois Cass; Clemens Wijers

Singles from Zunge
- 1. "Ich hasse Kinder" Released: 31 May 2021; 2. "Zunge" Released: 8 September 2023; 3. "Schweiss" Released: 29 September 2023; 4. "Nass" Released: 29 September 2023; 5. "Lecker" Released: 29 September 2023; 6. "Sport frei" Released: 27 October 2023; 7. "Übers Meer" Released: 3 May 2024

Singles from Zunge 2025
- 1. "Entre dos tierras" Released: 25 Dec 2023; 2. "Meine Welt" Released: 20 December 2024; 3. "Und die Engel singen" Released: 11 Jun 2025

Zunge (German for "tongue") is the debut solo studio album by Rammstein frontman Till Lindemann, released independently on 3 November 2023. It was preceded by the eponymous single on 8 September 2023 as well as the three singles "Schweiss", "Nass" and "Lecker" on 29 September and "Sport frei" on 27 October. While Lindemann wrote the album's lyrics, the music was written and produced by Sky van Hoff, Daniel Karelly, Olsen Involtini, Lois Cass and Clemens Wijers.

== Background ==
On 7 July 2023, German newspaper Die Zeit confirmed that the album had been completed for some time. While the album was finished and in the hands of Universal Music, both Lindemann and the label agreed to suspend their collaboration for the album's release. As a result, the eponymous lead single and the following singles were not released by the label.

The album was self-released by Lindemann on 3 November 2023. The singer toured in support of the record with 24 shows in Europe from November to December 2023.

In 2025, Lindemann re-released the album under the title of "Zunge 2025". The reissue includes the original album, along with nine additional tracks, three of which are previously unreleased, as well as several remixes.

== Track listing ==
All lyrics are written by Till Lindemann.

No.	Title	Music	Length
1.	"Zunge" (Tongue)	Daniel Karelly	4:35
2.	"Sport frei" (Sport Free)	Sky van Hoff	4:12
3.	"Altes Fleisch" (Old Flesh)	Sky van Hoff	4:24
4.	"Übers Meer" (Over the Sea)	Lois Cass; Olsen Involtini	3:19
5.	"Du hast kein Herz" (You Don't Have a Heart)	Sky van Hoff	3:52
6.	"Tanzlehrerin" (Dance Teacher)	Sky van Hoff	4:22
7.	"Nass" (Wet)	Daniel Karelly	3:53
8.	"Alles für die Kinder" (All for the Children)	Clemens Wijers	3:50
9.	"Schweiß" (Sweat)	Sky van Hoff	4:01
10.	"Lecker" (Yummy)	Daniel Karelly	3:31
11.	"Selbst verliebt" (Self-Love) (ends at 2:50, hidden track starts at 3:20)	Olsen Involtini; Daniel Karelly	6:28
Total length:			46:27

Physical edition (CD, Vinyl), 2025 Edition
No.	Title	Music	Length
7.	"Ich hasse Kinder" (I hate children)	Sky van Hoff	3:52

2025 edition
No.	Title	Music	Length
13.	"Prostitution" (Prostitution)	Sky van Hoff	3:32
14.	"Und die Engel singen" (And the angels sing)	Sky van Hoff	3:27
15.	"Meine Welt" (My world)	Nicolas Ludwig	4:02
16.	"Entre dos tierras" (Between two lands) (Héroes del Silencio cover)	Sky van Hoff	3:45
17.	"Meine Welt - Weltuntergang Remix by Aesthetic Perfection" (My world)	Nicolas Ludwig	3:46
18.	"Und die Engel singen - Alas Caidas Mix" (And the angels sing)	Sky van Hoff	4:17
19.	"Übers Meer - Piano version" (Over the sea)	Lois Cass	2:58
20.	"Lolipop" (Lolipop)	Clemens Wijers	4:09

== Personnel ==
- Till Lindemann – vocals
- Sky van Hoff – producer, engineer, mixer, instruments (2, 3, 5, 6, 9), choir (2)
- Daniel Karelly – producer, mixer, instruments, backing vocals (1, 7, 10, 11)
- Olsen Involtini – producer (4, 11), mixer (4, 8)
- Lois Cass – producer, keyboards, programming (4)
- Clemens Wijers – producer, engineer, instruments, backing vocals (8)
- Svante Forsbäck – mastering (all tracks)
- Marco Bayati – editor, drums (2, 3, 5, 9), choir (2)
- Marco Kollenz – editor, vocals (2, 3, 5, 9), choir, engineer (2)
- Constantin Krieg – keyboards, programming (4)
- Martin Te Laak – choir, conductor, arrangements (2)
- Aachener Kammenchor – choir, performer (2)
- Den Zozulya – artwork
- Rocket & Wink – artwork, art direction, design
- Gleb Davydov – artwork, concept

== Charts ==
=== Weekly charts ===
2023–2025 weekly chart performance for Zunge
Chart (2023–2025)	Peak position
Austrian Albums (Ö3 Austria)	10
Belgian Albums (Ultratop Flanders)	64
German Albums (Offizielle Top 100)	2
German Rock & Metal Albums (Offizielle Top 100)	2
Polish Albums (ZPAV) Zunge 2025	30
Swiss Albums (Schweizer Hitparade)	18
UK Album Downloads (Official Charts)	26

=== Year-end charts ===
2023 year-end chart performance for Zunge
Chart (2023)	Position
German Albums (Offizielle Top 100)	66

2025 year-end chart performance for Zunge
Chart (2025)	Position
German Albums (Offizielle Top 100)	87
