= Vattica =

American singer-songwriter

VATTICA
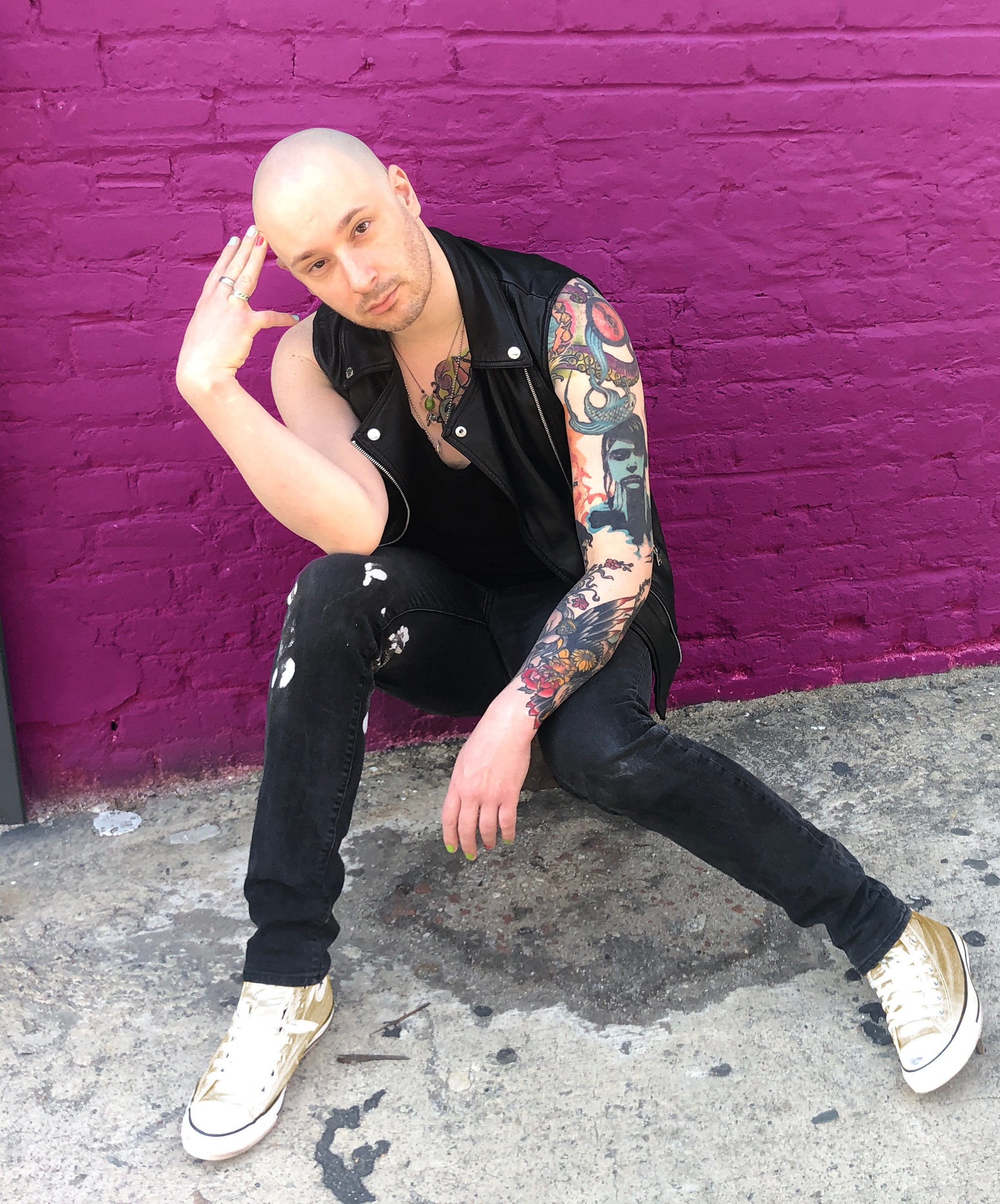
- Alexander Millar in 2021

Background information
- Also known as: Vattica
- Origin: Los Angeles, California, U.S.
- Genres: Alternative rock
- Years active: 2013–present
- Labels: RED Music; Another Century Records; Sony Music
- Members: Alexander Millar (singer)
- Website: officialvattica.com

Vattica, (stylized VATTICA) is an American alternative rock band from Los Angeles, California formed in 2013. Singer, songwriter, multi-instrumentalist, and producer Alexander Millar is the only permanent member of the band. The band has performed at venues such as The Viper Room, The Roxy Theater and The Troubadour. They were signed to a recording contract in 2015 by Another Century / Sony Music.

== History ==
VATTICA formed in 2013 in Los Angeles, California as a collaboration between Alexander Millar, Prentice and Joey Jane. The name VATTICA is a fusion of Old English and Latin root words and syllables: Vat (faet), meaning vessel, and Vatic/Vatical (of or characteristic of a prophet or oracle), and Ah (exclamation expressing surprise/irony). By 2014 the group had performed at various notable venues and clubs around Los Angeles, including The Roxy Theater, Whisky a Go Go, The Viper Room and The Troubadour.

=== Early years (2014–2017) ===
In August 2014, VATTICA entered the studio to record a self-produced demo album in Los Angeles. In January 2015, the band announced their signing to Another Century Records.

=== Debut album recording (2016–2017) ===
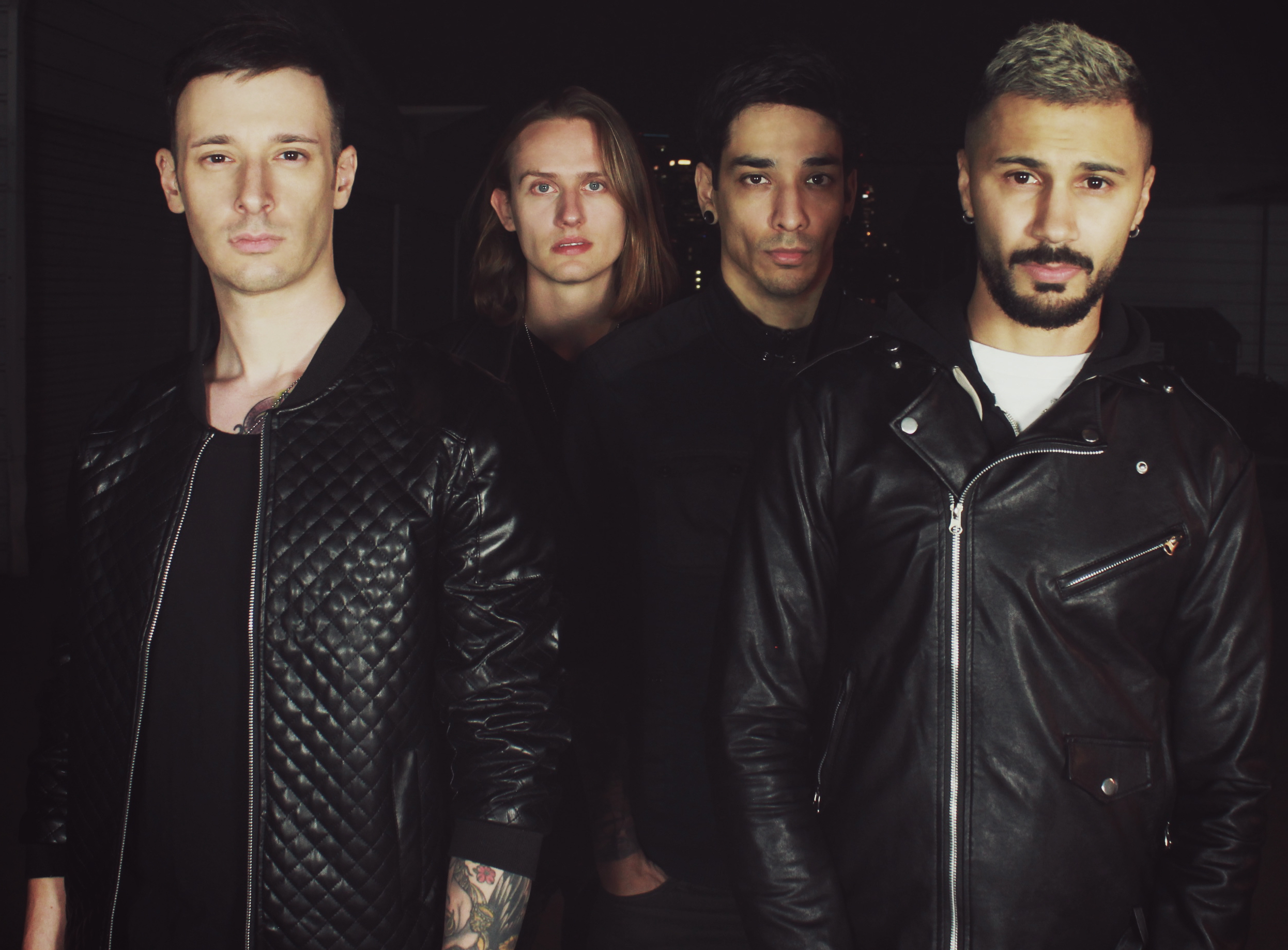
VATTICA in 2016

In 2016 VATTICA entered the studio to begin recording their debut album at The Mix Room in Burbank, California, with record producer Ben Grosse. In 2017 VATTICA finished their debut album. At the same time, Another Century was absorbed by RED Music. Alexander elaborated on the separation further in an interview with Pure Grain Media. In an interview with Bi Pride UK in 2020 Alexander spoke further about getting out of the band's recording contract. VATTICA then joined forces with new management and released their first single, “REMEMBER TO BREATHE”, on their own label VILLIS with distribution through The Orchard in April 2018.

=== Criminal (2018–2019) ===
VATTICA released their second single and music video, "Criminal", in October 2018. In 2019 VATTICA announced that the band would be appearing on the High School Nation tour.

=== Believe, Make It (I Know) (2020–2021) ===
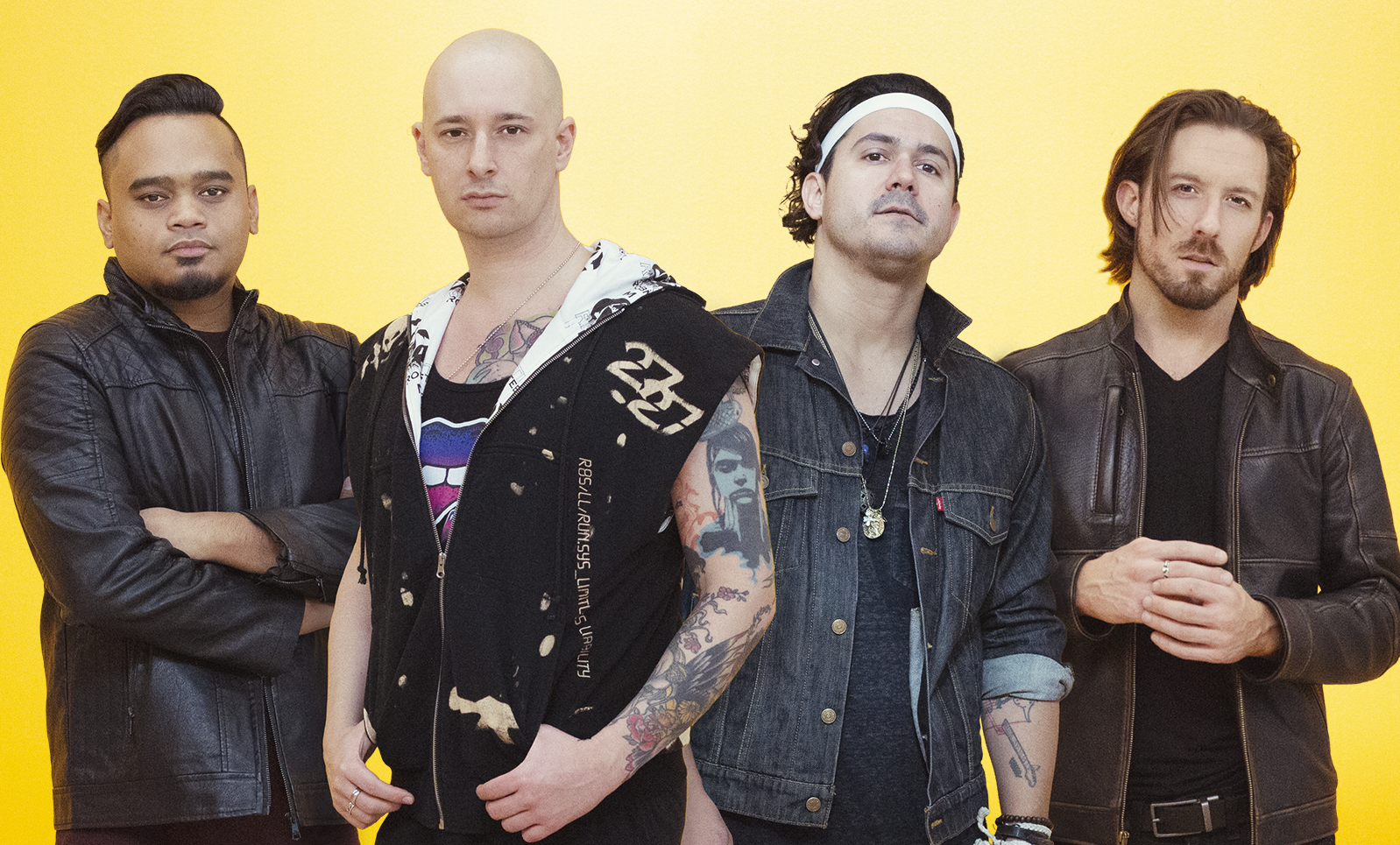
VATTICA in 2020

In 2020 VATTICA released their debut EP entitled "Believe". That same month the COVID-19 pandemic hit the United States and all of their shows were canceled and the newly added members of the group went their separate ways. During this time Alexander kept writing music and VATTICA released their single "Make It (I Know)".

=== Broken Glass, Gasoline (2021–2023) ===
VATTICA released two singles in 2021; "Broken Glass" and "Gasoline". The official music video for "Gasoline" was released exclusively on TikTok.

=== TikTok influence (2020–present) ===
Alexander does a regular series on VATTICA's TikTok called "Self Made is a Toxic Myth" where they critique the idea that there is such a thing as a self made artist. The series has garnered millions of views. In 2023 they debuted another series on TikTok, called "Nothing Is Neutral", which is also popular.

=== Back To Life (2023–present) ===
On February 24 VATTICA released a new single called "BACK TO LIFE". Alexander stated in interviews that they wrote the song about their struggles with OCD and Anxiety.

== Musical style ==
VATTICA's music is alternative pop rock characterized by soaring vocal melodies, driving guitars, vast orchestration and commanding rhythm sections of wide dynamic variety. Their lyrical content often reflects on the universal themes of the human experience, while also commenting on sociopolitical issues.

=== Public image and activism ===
Alexander has publicly stated that they are non-binary and queer. They are also a part of Good Trouble Makers, a queer Black-led anti-racist artist collective.

== Members ==
Current

- Alexander Millar – songwriting, lead vocals, guitar, piano, keyboard, programming, recording, engineering, mixing, mastering

Former

- Prentice – songwriting, drums, percussion, backing vocals
- Joey Jane – songwriting, bass, backing vocals
