= Lovebubble =

Studio album by Book of Love
- Released: June 15, 1993
- Recorded: Unique Recording, NYC
- Genres: New wave, synth-pop
- Length: 43:10; 66:00 (2009 reissue)
- Label: Sire
- Producer: Ted Ottaviano

Book of Love chronology
Candy Carol (1991)	Lovebubble (1993)	I Touch Roses: The Best of Book of Love (2001)

Singles from Lovebubble
- 1. "Boy Pop" Released: 6 May 1993; 2. "Hunny Hunny"/"Chatterbox (Pt. 2)" Released: 23 September 1993

Professional ratings
Review scores
Source	Rating
AllMusic	2/5 stars
PopMatters	5/10 stars

Lovebubble is the fourth and final studio album by American synth-pop and electronic band Book of Love, released on June 15, 1993, by Sire Records.

== History ==
New York-based synth-pop quartet Book of Love released their fourth record, Lovebubble, two years following their mostly overlooked album, 1991's Candy Carol. Lovebubble was released with little fanfare amidst the changing musical tides of the early nineties with grunge dominating the alternative landscape. Before work began on the band's fourth album, the band had an important band meeting. In a 2009 interview, Susan Ottaviano stated, "We asked each other, 'Do you think we can do it again?' The '80s were over and we were ushering in the '90s with bands like Nirvana and Pearl Jam. The funny thing is, when you're out there touring, you just think it's going to keep going on and on and on."

The band recorded the album in New York City at Unique Recording, the same studios where they recorded parts of their previous three records. Ted Ottaviano produced the record, making it his first time solely in the producer's seat. The album contained mixed styles and creative ideas from all four members of the group, with each member taking a turn as lead vocalist. The songs "Tambourine", "Flower In My Hand", and "Enchanted" dated back to the early days of the band and were more in the style of the first two albums, while "Boy Pop" and "Chatterbox (Pt. 2)" moved in a new club-oriented direction. "We were more fractured as a band. This fracture paved the way to a more open, freer recording process. We accepted each other more"

The track "Sunday A.M." was inspired by Junior Vasquez and Ted Ottaviano and Lauren Roselli's Sunday mornings at The Sound Factory in New York City. "Happily Ever After" featured Lauren Roselli on lead vocals, and a lyric about counting each of twelve tears after a breakup. The song contained a sample of The 5th Dimension's hit "Aquarius". The album also contains two cover songs. The first,"Sound and Vision", was originally done by David Bowie, who is one of the band's biggest heroes and inspirations. The second cover song, "Woyaya", originally done by Ghanaian Afro-pop group Osibisa and later covered by Art Garfunkel, features Ted Ottaviano on lead vocals, a lone drum beat, and the ambient noise of a city protest.

Prior to the album release, the band released the first single "Boy Pop" in May 1993, a dance track and ode to gay men, with its lyric of "brother love... across the nation... on the bottom or the top, when we go, we go pop... boys united cannot be divided...". The song became a huge club hit, peaking at no. 4 on the Billboard Hot Dance Club Play chart. A promotional video was shot showing the band at a club/bar and many muscular fit dancers.

On June 15, 1993, Book of Love released their fourth record, Lovebubble. The album did not chart. The album's cover sleeve featured artwork by Talking Heads' frontman David Byrne, a piece composed of a tic tac toe square of nine different images.

The second and final single taken from the record was "Hunny Hunny"/"Chatterbox (Pt. 2)", a double A-side single, released in September 1993. "Hunny Hunny" featured Lauren Roselli on lead vocals, nursery rhyme lyrics, and cascading arpeggiated synths. In contrast, the flip side, "Chatterbox (Pt. 2)", penned by Jade Lee, featured Jade on lead vocals spouting off a stream-of-consciousness lyric to a house flavored backing track. Neither song charted.

The album track "Enchanted" was included on the soundtrack to the 1993 film Naked in New York.

To promote Lovebubble, the band played a small tour of a few select small clubs in early 1994. Following the small tour, the band went their separate ways before Book of Love became obsolete.

Reflecting on the album and Book of Love's final chapter in 2009, Susan Ottaviano stated, "It didn't help that when the album came out, we were totally not behind it. When we were supposed to support the fourth album, nobody wanted to do anything... It was sad and bittersweet. We felt we had to separate in order to move forward. We had completely poisoned our magic mix. We were cordial while making Lovebubble, but the camaradarie was gone. "You can't make magic with four cordial people", stated Ted Ottaviano in a 2009 interview.

Speaking about the '90s in an interview, Susan Ottaviano stated, "Melody was sort of falling by the wayside and getting into a little bit more of the riffs and some of the things that we didn't fit as well, and I think that also we were having the growing pains in the band and in general about how to move forward." In a 2013 interview, Ted Ottaviano explained, "I wouldn't just say that grunge killed it. I just think it wasn't apparent that basically, musically, audiences had changed and they wanted to hear different things. We did. We were as much of a music participant as anyone else. Most of the electronic music became more dance oriented, and techno and house [industrial] went towards that direction, and then more alternative music went back to a really traditional sort of almost rock or post-punk sort of vein. It felt like the synth pop songs that we were doing didn't feel like they had a place at that moment, in a strange way, even for us. You could feel the tide change. We could've continued going on if we wanted to, we just basically felt we had sort of done our thing at that point."

In 2009, Lovebubble was remastered and reissued by Collector's Choice/Noble Rot Records. The reissue featured four rare bonus remixes: "Boy Pop" (Go Bottom Go Top), "Boy Pop" (Swinging Boy Pop Mix), "Hunny Hunny" (Sweet and Sticky Mix), and "Chatterbox (Pt. 2)" (Late Nite Chat Mix).

== Release and reception ==
Lovebubble was released on June 15, 1993, with fourteen tracks in the formats of CD and cassette. Lovebubble failed to chart on the Billboard charts. Two singles were culled from the album: "Boy Pop" and "Hunny Hunny/Chatterbox (Pt. 2)" in 1993.

AllMusic's Tom Demalon noted that "while there are some fun moments on Lovebubble (the sprightly pop of "Flower in My Hand"), most fans will find Book of Love's earlier work much more engaging and essential." Ira Robbins of Trouser Press wrote, "Ottaviano's production keeps Book of Love current by relegating dance beats to a semi-ambient role; the band focuses on breezy harmonies and seductive audio collages as rhythms percolate gently... Lovebubble is an airy, relaxing charmer." Robbins drew comparisons to artists such as Orchestral Manoeuvres in the Dark, Madonna, and ABBA.

Reviewing the 2009 reissue, PopMatters' Christel Loar gave Lovebubble a 5/10 and noted, "It gives the listener a taste of each individual’s personality and contribution to the whole. However, the whole, as usual, was more than the sum of its parts, and, apparently, Book of Love was no longer adding up. The magic melding of elements, the alchemical compound produced during [albums] Book of Love and Lullaby (and to a lesser extent, Candy Carol) was separating and the chemistry dissolving. It’s interesting to note that LoveBubble is the only Book of Love album to feature all four members as lead vocalists, but the eclectic charm of the distinct styles and voices isn’t enough to raise this record to the level of the previous three."

== Track listing ==
No.	Title	Writer(s)	Length
1.	"Sunday A.M."	Theodore Ottaviano	2:55
2.	"Happily Ever After"	L. Roselli/T. Ottaviano/J. Rado/G. Ragni/G. MacDermot	4:19
3.	"Sound and Vision"	David Bowie	3:46
4.	"Hunny Hunny"	Theodore Ottaviano	4:06
5.	"Trouble In A Bubble"	Theodore Ottaviano	3:00
6.	"Chatterbox (Pt. 1)"	Jade Lee	1:10
7.	"Salve My Soul"	S. Ottaviano/T. Ottaviano	3:03
8.	"Woyaya"	R.M. Bailey/R. Bedeau/Teddy Osei/Mac Tonto/W. Richardson/Sol Amarfio/Loughty Amao	1:11
9.	"Boy Pop"	L. Roselli/T. Ottaviano	4:05
10.	"Flower In My Hand"	S. Ottaviano/T. Ottaviano	3:01
11.	"Enchanted"	S. Ottaviano/T. Ottaviano	3:57
12.	"Tambourine"	Theodore Ottaviano	3:37
13.	"Leap of Faith"	S. Ottaviano/T. Ottaviano	1:35
14.	"Chatterbox (Pt. 2)"	J. Lee/T. Ottaviano	3:32

Bonus tracks on 2009 CD reissue
No.	Title	Writer(s)	Length
15.	"Boy Pop (Go Bottom Go Top)"	L. Roselli/T. Ottaviano	7:36
16.	"Boy Pop (Swinging Boy Pop Mix)"	L. Roselli/T. Ottaviano	3:49
17.	"Hunny Hunny (Sweet and Sticky Mix)"	Theodore Ottaviano	5:41
18.	"Chatterbox (Pt. 2) (Late Nite Chat Mix)"	J. Lee/T. Ottaviano	5:45

== Personnel ==
- Ted Ottaviano – keyboards, programming, vocals (lead vocals on "Woyaya")
- Lauren Roselli – keyboards, vocals (lead vocals on "Sunday A.M.", "Happily Ever After", and "Hunny Hunny")
- Jade Lee – keyboards, percussion, vocals [lead vocals on "Chatterbox (Pt. 1) and "Chatterbox (Pt. 2)"]
- Susan Ottaviano – vocals

Additional personnel:

- Produced by Ted Ottaviano
- Engineered by Richard Joseph
- "Happily Ever After", "Hunny Hunny", "Trouble In A Bubble", "Boy Pop", "Tambourine" mixed by Michael Hutchinson
- "Sunday A.M.", "Sound and Vision", "Salve My Soul", "Flower In My Hand", "Enchanted", "Leap of Faith", "Chatterbox (Pt. 2)" mixed by Hugo Dwyer
- Assistant Engineers: Keith 'Skiter' Freeman, Dave Cozzie, Ron Malloy, John Parthum, Hoover Le
- Mastered by Ted Jensen at Sterling Sound
- Recorded at Unique Recording, NYC
- Mixed at Axis Recording and Platinum Island, NYC
- Additional drum programming by George Rosario
- Cover artwork by David Byrne
- Art Direction and Design by Jade Lee
- Photos by John Dugdale
- Drawings by Susan Ottaviano
- Clothing by Jeffrey Costello
- Management: Stiletto Management, Inc.
- Guitars on "Happily Ever After" by Richard Joseph
- Boy rap on "Boy Pop" by Ron Malloy

Reissue credits:

- Reissue Executive Producer: Gordon Anderson
- Liner Notes: Michael Paoletta
- Mastered by: Bob Fisher
- Thanks to: Mark Pinkus and Dave Kapp
- Management: Michael Pagnotta for Reach Media

== Chart positions ==
=== Singles ===
Year	Song	Chart peak positions
Year	Song	US Club Play
1993	"Boy Pop"	4
1993	"Hunny Hunny"/"Chatterbox (Pt. 2)"	—

"—" denotes a release that did not chart.
