= This Place Will Become Your Tomb =

Studio album by Sleep Token
- Released: 24 September 2021
- Studio: G1 Productions (Wells)
- Genres: Alternative metal; indie pop; progressive metal; progressive rock; post-rock
- Length: 52:01
- Label: Spinefarm
- Producer: George Lever

Sleep Token chronology
Sundowning (2019)	This Place Will Become Your Tomb (2021)	Take Me Back to Eden (2023)

Singles from This Place Will Become Your Tomb
- 1. "Alkaline" Released: 18 June 2021; 2. "The Love You Want" Released: 6 August 2021; 3. "Fall for Me" Released: 17 September 2021

This Place Will Become Your Tomb is the second studio album by the anonymous English rock band Sleep Token. It was recorded at G1 Productions, produced by George Lever, and released on 24 September 2021 by Spinefarm Records.

== Concept ==
This album is the second in a trilogy, bookended by Sundowning in 2019 and Take Me Back to Eden in 2023. It continues the story of the relationship between Vessel and the deity known as 'Sleep'.

From the official press release:

[The album] delves further into the enigmatic universe of Sleep Token, pushing boundaries and blurring genres, whilst retaining their signature sound.

== Release ==
This Place Will Become Your Tomb was announced on 18 June 2021, accompanied by the release of "Alkaline" as the lead single and music video. It was followed by "The Love You Want" on 6 August and "Fall for Me" on 17 September.

== Live performances ==
On the same day as the "Alkaline" release, the band performed on the Second Stage at the Download Festival Pilot, where the song made its live debut.

== Reception ==
Professional ratings
Review scores
Source	Rating
Daily Express	4/5 stars
Distorted Sound	10/10
Gigwise	7/10 stars
Kerrang!	3/5
The Line of Best Fit	7/10
Metal Injection	6/10
Under the Radar	7/10 stars
Upset	4/5 stars

=== Critical ===
Media response to This Place Will Become Your Tomb was generally positive. Under the Radar's Haydon Spenceley called the album "accessible".

In a 10/10 review written for Distorted Sound, Daniel Fella described the album as a "masterpiece", claiming that "it's unforgettable, unique and damn close to flawless ...".

Daily Express columnist Callum Crumlish gave the album four out of five stars, praising the lyrical content as the band's best yet, as well as the band's development into other musical styles since Sundowning. Crumlish's few criticisms of the release included claims that some songs "feel a little stretched" and that 'Fall for Me' felt "out of place" on the album.

Reviewers for Upset also rate the album 4/5: „Even though "it's full with great moments [...] in between those are some jagged transitions of sounds that don't completely marry".

Kerrang! writer James MacKinnon gave TPWBYT a rating of 3/5. He praised the album for presenting "compelling songs that we can relate to", highlighting "Alkaline", "Hypnosis" and "The Love You Want". However, he added that much of the record "doesn't maintain [the same] level of inspiration", and that Sleep Token "[fails] to recognise when to wrap up a track".

Gigwise's Harrison Smith was impressed by the range of lyrical themes and musical styles adopted, but still felt that the "lack of distinction between tracks ... detracts from the album's genre-blurring flow".

In contrast, Wepea Buntugu of The Line of Best Fit suggested that the album had a "distinct sound" and "flows smoothly from one song to the next, with just enough variety of melodies to stave off monotony...".

=== Commercial ===
This Place Will Become Your Tomb gave Sleep Token their first chart positions in the UK, debuting at number 39 on the Top 40 UK Albums Chart and at number 13 on the Top 20 Scottish Albums Chart. In the midweek chart, it was slated to debut at number 11. The album also registered at number 12 on the UK Album Downloads Chart, number 11 on the UK Album Sales Chart, number 12 on the UK Physical Albums Chart, and number 13 on the UK Vinyl Albums Chart.

On 21 November 2025, This Place Will Become Your Tomb topped the UK Rock & Metal Albums Chart.

== Accolades ==
At the end of 2021, Distorted Sound ranked This Place Will Become Your Tomb as the third best album of the year out of 100, while Metal Hammer ranked the album 18th out of 50 albums on its end-of-year list. Kerrang! ranked it at number 48 in its list of the 50 best albums of 2021. Writer Emma Wilkes hailed the release as "emotionally vivid" and named all three singles plus "Hypnosis" as highlights.

Eight of Metal Hammer's writers included the album in their top 20 lists - five of whom ranked it in their top 10.

In January 2023, Metal Hammer included "Alkaline", "The Love You Want", "Fall for Me" and "Hypnosis" in its list of Sleep Token's ten best songs.

== Track listing ==
All tracks are written by Vessel and II unless otherwise noted

No.	Title	Writer(s)	Length
1.	"Atlantic"		4:53
2.	"Hypnosis"		5:35
3.	"Mine"		4:56
4.	"Like That"	Vessel; II; George Lever	3:34
5.	"The Love You Want"		4:23
6.	"Fall for Me"	Vessel	2:26
7.	"Alkaline"		3:34
8.	"Distraction"		4:22
9.	"Descending"	Vessel; Lever	4:38
10.	"Telomeres"		5:07
11.	"High Water"		5:13
12.	"Missing Limbs"	Vessel	3:20
Total length:			52:01

== Personnel ==
- Vessel – vocals, guitar, keyboards, percussion
- II – drums
- George Lever – production, engineering, bass
- Sky van Hoff – mixing, editing, synthesizers, programming

== Charts ==
Chart performance for This Place Will Become Your Tomb
Chart (2021–2025)	Peak position
German Albums (Offizielle Top 100)	37
Scottish Albums (OCC)	13
UK Albums (OCC)	39
UK Progressive Albums (OCC)	3
UK Rock & Metal Albums (OCC)	1

== Certifications ==
Certifications for This Place Will Become Your Tomb
Region	Certification	Certified units/sales
United Kingdom (BPI)	Silver	60,000^{‡}
^{‡} Sales+streaming figures based on certification alone.
