= The Sorrow =

Austrian extreme metal band

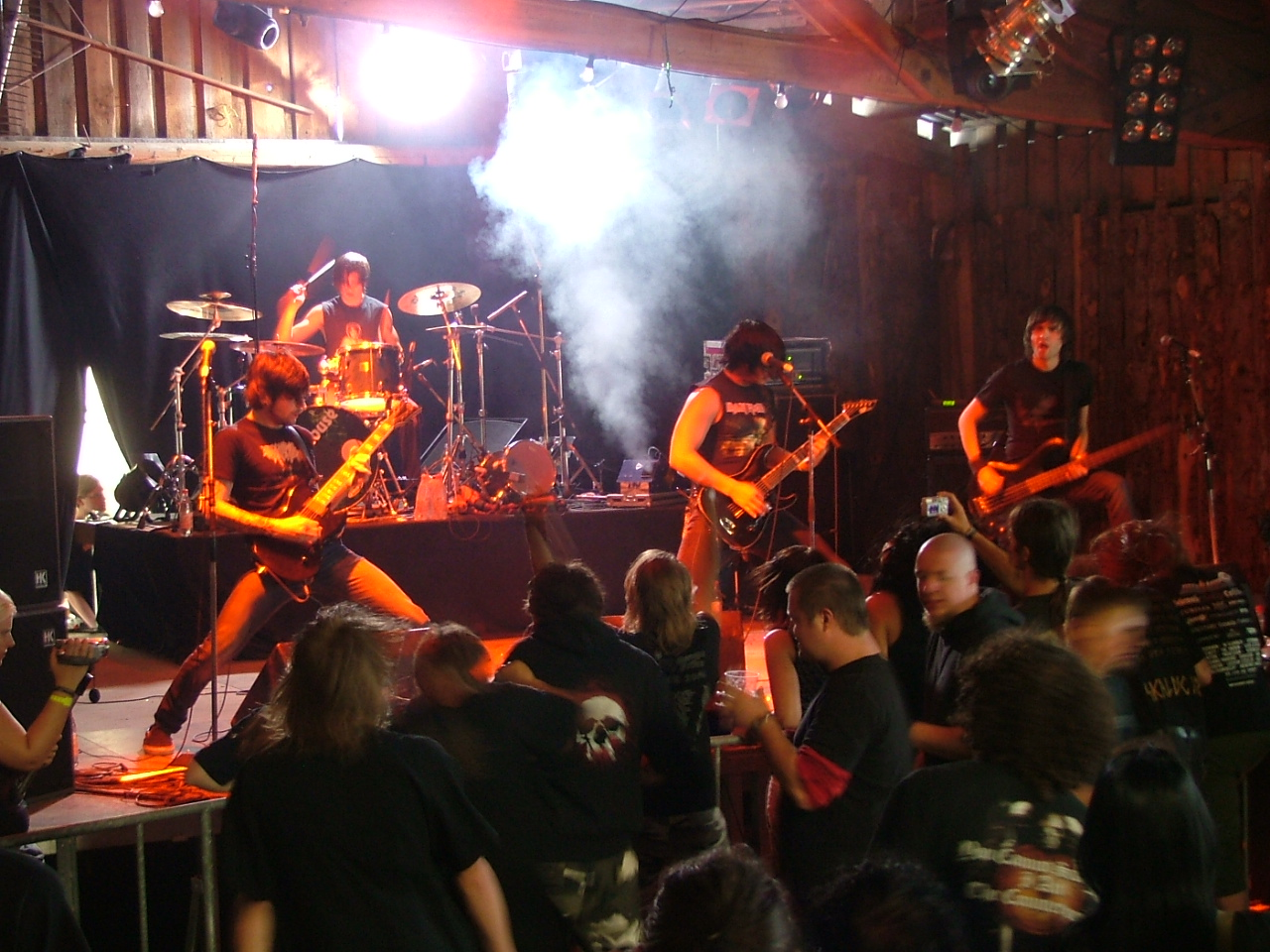
- The Sorrow in 2007

Background information
- Origin: Vorarlberg, Austria
- Genres: Melodic metalcore
- Years active: 2005–2017
- Labels: Drakkar, Napalm
- Members: Mathias Schlegl; Andreas Mäser; Dominik Immler; Tobias Schädler

The Sorrow was an Austrian metal band from Vorarlberg. They were formed in 2005 by Mathias Schlegel and Andreas Mäser from the band Disconnected and Dominik Immler and Tobias Schädler from the band Distance. In 2006, they signed a recording contract with Drakkar Records, and in 2007 released their debut album Blessings from a Blackened Sky.

== Discography ==
=== Albums ===
List of studio albums, with selected chart positions
Title	Album details	Peak chart positions	
Title	Album details	AUT	GER
Blessings from a Blackened Sky	Released: April 27, 2007; Label: Drakkar; Formats: CD, digital download	—	—
Origin of the Storm	Released: February 27, 2009; Label: Drakkar; Formats: CD, digital download	25	56
The Sorrow	Released: October 29, 2010; Label: Drakkar; Formats: CD, digital download	24	—
Misery Escape	Released: October 26, 2012; Label: Napalm; Formats: CD, digital download	18	94
"—" denotes a recording that did not chart or was not released in that territory.

=== Singles ===
- Death from a Lover's Hand (2007)
- Knights of Doom (2007)
- Where Is the Sun? (2009)
- Crossing Jordan (2010)
- Perspectives (2012)

=== Music videos ===
- Knights of Doom (2007)
- Where Is the Sun? (2009)
- Crossing Jordan (2010)
- Farewells (2011)
- Burial Bridge (2012)
- Perspectives (2012)
- Retracing Memories (2013)
