= The Sorrow (album) =

Studio album by The Sorrow
- Released: October 29, 2010
- Genre: Melodic metalcore
- Length: 61:46
- Label: Drakkar Records
- Producer: Toni Meloni & The Sorrow

The Sorrow chronology
Origin of the Storm (2009)	The Sorrow (2010)	Misery Escape (2012)

The Sorrow is the third full-length by the Melodic metalcore band The Sorrow. It was released on October 29, 2010 through Drakkar Records.

== Track listing ==
No.	Title	Length
1.	"Afflictions"	5:01
2.	"Crossing Jordan"	4:57
3.	"The Weight of the World"	4:06
4.	"Suffering Quotes"	4:22
5.	"Heart of a Lion"	4:03
6.	"Farewells"	5:41
7.	"You Are My Nemesis"	4:18
8.	"Paragon in Charity"	5:07
9.	"Draped in Misery"	5:07
10.	"Grief Machine"	3:55
11.	"Engraved In Our Hearts"	5:03
12.	"Facing the End"	4:06
13.	"Reach for the Skies"	5:17
Total length:		61:46
