= Steve Binetti =

German composer and musician

Steve Binetti (born June 1, 1966) is a German composer and musician. A well-recognized member of the Berlin underground music scene, Binetti has performed with numerous rock and roll and blues groups and has recorded both solo and collaborative music recordings.

== Life ==
Since 1984, Binetti has played in the bands "Hard Pop", "This Pop Generation", and "B.R.O.N.X." Selected recordings of his works with these groups have been published in compilation albums by the former East German alternative record label die anderen bands. Binetti has performed with numerous musicians of GDR-era fame, including most notably Paul Landers (Rammstein), Christian Lorenz (Rammstein), Steven Garling, Conny Bauer, Klaus Selmke, Peter Hollinger and Frank Neumeier.

Binetti has worked as a composer and musician at various German theatres since 1992, including the Volksbühne (Berlin), Schillertheater (Berlin), Maxim Gorki Theater, and Schauspielhaus Bremen. Binetti has primarily composed and performed in the plays of Frank Castorf, namely in his stage productions of "A Clockwork Orange", "Fruen fra Havet", "Hochzeitsreise", "Terrordrom" and "Im Dickicht der Städte". In 2006, he composed the music score for the motion picture "Beyond the Balance" ("Herzentöter").

== Discography ==
Delphinium and Cynosure (BMG, 1991)
The Complete Clockwork Orange Soundtrack (Drunkenkid-Music, 1993)
Fruen fra Havet (Drunkenkid-Music, 1994)
Thicket (Drunkenkid-Music, 2006)
Herzentöter – Remixed and Original Soundtracks from the Motion Picture (Ziegler-Verlag, Drunkenkid-Music, 2007)
Driving Alone (Drunkenkid-Music, 2007)
Kean (Drunkenkid-Music, 2009)
Paris, Texas (Drunkenkid-Music, 2011)
