= Richard Kruspe =

German rock musician

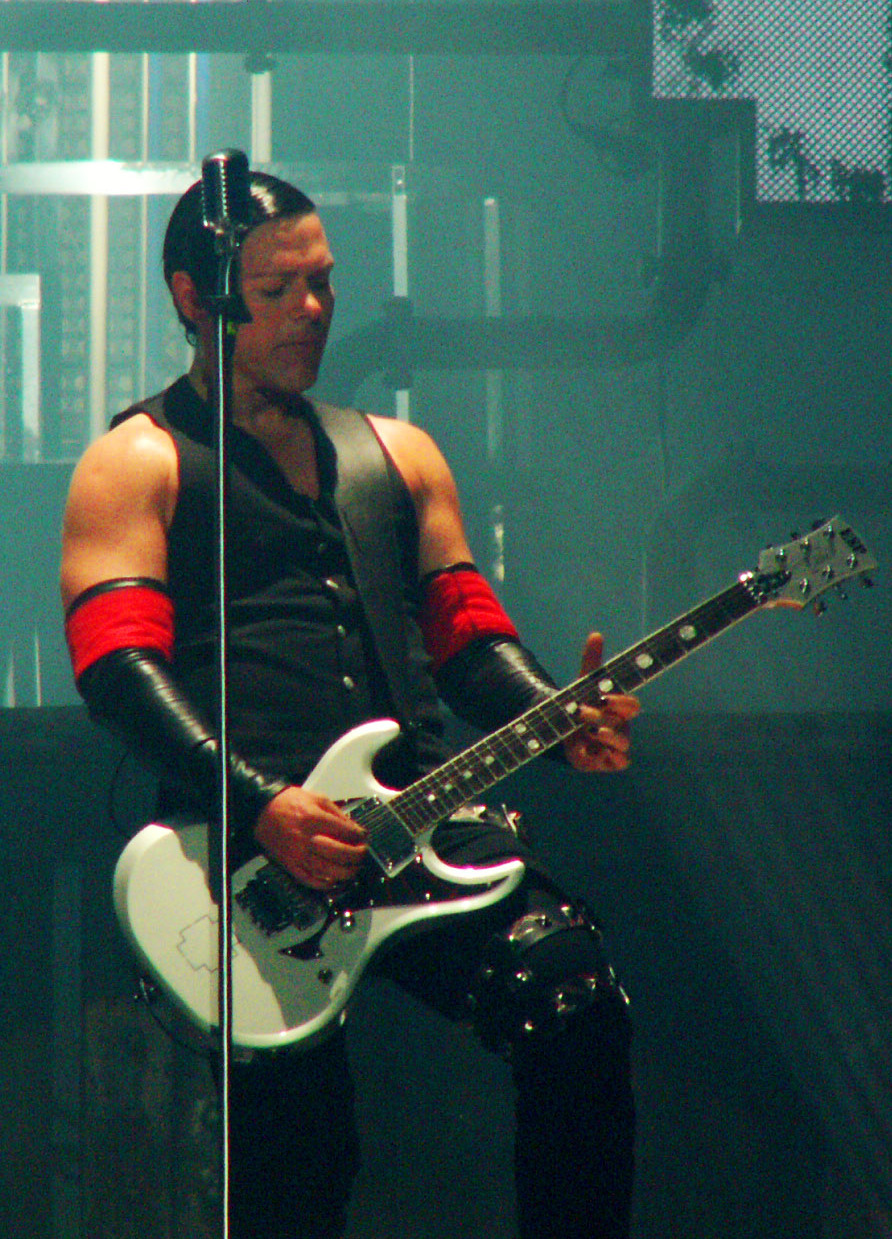
- Kruspe with Rammstein in 2009

Background information
- Also known as: Richard Z. Kruspe; Richard Zven Kruspe
- Born: Sven Kruspe; 24 June 1967 (age 59); Wittenberge, East Germany
- Genres: Neue Deutsche Härte; industrial metal; alternative metal
- Occupation: Musician
- Instruments: Guitar; vocals; keyboards
- Years active: 1985–present
- Member of: Rammstein; Emigrate
- Formerly of: First Arsch; Orgasm Death Gimmick; Das Elegante Chaos

Richard Kruspe (German pronunciation: [ˈʁɪçaʁt ˈkʁʊspə]; born Sven Kruspe; 24 June 1967) is a German musician. He is the lead guitarist and one of the founders of the Neue Deutsche Härte band Rammstein, as well as the frontman of the industrial metal band Emigrate. He has released eight studio albums with Rammstein and four albums with Emigrate.

== Early life ==
Sven Kruspe was born in Wittenberge, then part of East Germany. He later changed his first name to Richard, believing that anyone should be able to change their name if they want to. Kruspe has a younger sister and an older brother. His parents divorced when he was young, and his mother remarried. The family moved from the village of Weisen to Schwerin when Kruspe was young. He did not get along with his stepfather, who would be physically abusive, and Kruspe often ran away from home in his early teens. During his youth, Kruspe was a wrestler for seven years.

In a 2014 interview with Metal Hammer, Kruspe commented on life in East Germany, stating: "The thing about East Germany is that it was great to grow up there until you were 12. You were presented with the illusion of a very healthy society, which worked unless you asked questions – and you don't ask questions until you're 12."

At age 16, Kruspe and some friends visited Czechoslovakia, where he bought a guitar, originally planning to sell it. He then met a girl who saw him with the guitar and insisted he play something. When Kruspe hit random notes in frustration, the girl commented that it sounded "beautiful" and the moment would inspire him to learn how to play guitar. Kruspe later studied jazz guitar at the conservatorium in Schwerin for four years.

== Career ==
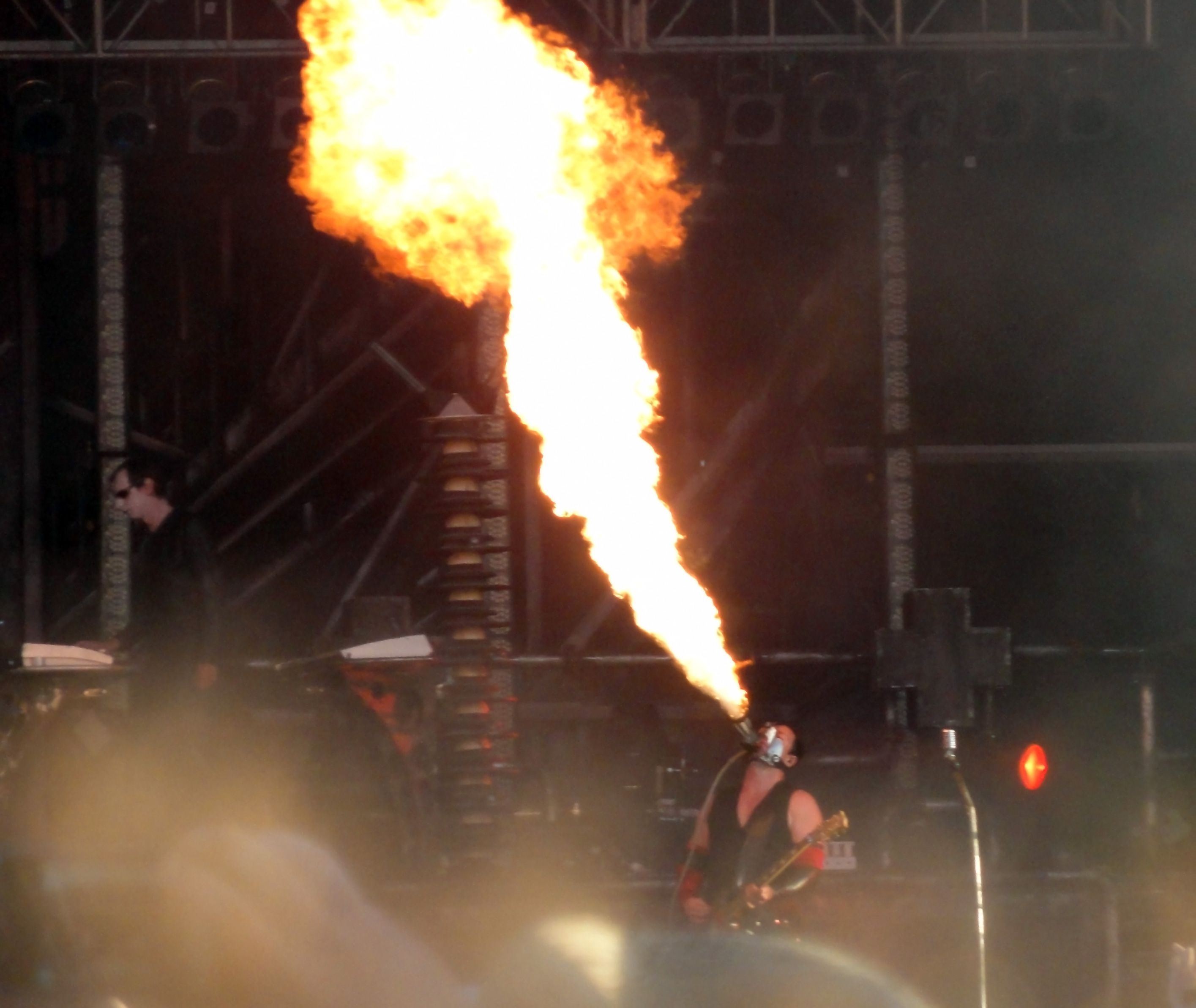
Kruspe during a performance of the Rammstein song "Feuer frei!"

In the late 1980s, Kruspe moved to East Berlin. For two years, he lived in an apartment with a drum kit and a guitar and made music by himself as he was not familiar with the local music scene. On 10 October 1989, Kruspe found himself in the middle of a political demonstration after exiting a subway station. He was then hit on the head by police and arrested. Kruspe spent the next six days in jail where he was interrogated and beaten by authorities. Once out of jail, he decided to leave East Germany. Because of the Eastern Bloc, he entered West Germany by traveling through Hungary. When the Berlin Wall came down, he moved back to Schwerin in East Germany.

Kruspe's first band, Das Elegante Chaos, was formed in 1987. The band recorded material in 1989 that were later released on the album Lyrik in 2011. Following the break-up of Das Elegante Chaos in 1989, Kruspe formed Orgasm Death Gimmick in 1991. The band released three demo tapes before disbanding in 1993. Kruspe was also a member of First Arsch with singer and drummer Till Lindemann and guitarist Paul Landers. The band released their debut album, Saddle Up, in 1992.

In 1992, Kruspe traveled to the southwest of the United States together with Lindemann and bassist Oliver Riedel. Upon returning to Germany, he decided to pursue a new style of music that combined machine-like sounds with heavy guitars. In 1993, Kruspe formed a new project with roommates Riedel and drummer Christoph Schneider named Tempelprayers. Together with singer Lindemann, they entered the Berlin Senate Metrobeat contest with a demo tape in 1994 and won a recording session in a professional studio. That same year, the band was joined by guitarist Landers and keyboardist Christian Lorenz, and changed their name to Rammstein.

== Personal life ==
Kruspe has three children, two daughters and one son. He married South African actress Caron Bernstein on 29 October 1999. The ceremony was Jewish, and Kruspe composed the music for it. He took the last name Kruspe-Bernstein during their marriage. Kruspe moved from Berlin to New York in 2001 to live closer to Bernstein and work on his side-project Emigrate. They separated in 2004, and he reverted to his original last name. Kruspe moved back to Berlin in 2011.

== Equipment ==
Kruspe has been an endorser of ESP Guitars since 1996. He bought his first ESP guitar, a sunburst 901 model, in 1990. Kruspe primarily used 901 models and Kirk Hammett signature model guitars for recording and touring until ESP produced his signature model guitars the ESP RZK-I in the mid-2000s and the RZK-II in the early 2010s. In 2023, after the European Union decided on a non-literal translation for "kill switch", the special spring push knob on the guitar, he received his custom J+Q Rgo RZK-III signature guitar from ESP that was designed for him in 1993. He also uses other ESP guitars, including Eclipse models and a Ron Wood signature model, in the studio. Kruspe was previously endorsed by EMG and was a long-time user of EMG 81 pickups before switching to Fishman in 2018 and joining their Fluence artist roster in 2023. He also has a signature Fluence pickup set. Kruspe mainly uses Mesa/Boogie amplifiers and cabinets, notably the Mark II C+ and Dual Rectifiers amps and 4×12 cabinets, in addition to Friedman and Soldano amps. He also uses the Kemper Profiler in the studio and live. Kruspe has a signature guitar pick and a signature string set through Dunlop and SIT Strings respectively.

== Discography ==
Rammstein

- Herzeleid (1995)
- Sehnsucht (1997)
- Mutter (2001)
- Reise, Reise (2004)
- Rosenrot (2005)
- Liebe ist für alle da (2009)
- Untitled Rammstein album (2019)
- Zeit (2022)

Emigrate

- Emigrate (2007)
- Silent So Long (2014)
- A Million Degrees (2018)
- The Persistence of Memory (2021)

First Arsch

- Saddle Up (1992)

Das Elegante Chaos

- Lyrik (2011)

Other appearances

- Apocalyptica – "Helden" from Worlds Collide (2007)
- Hotei – "Move It" from Strangers (2015)
- VAMPS – "Rise or Die" from Underworld (2017)
- Aesthetic Perfection – "Gods & Gold" from Into The Black (2019)
- Lifeline International – "Come Together" (2022)
