= Caron Bernstein =

South African actress and model

- Born: 16 August 1970 (age 56)
- Education: School of the Arts, Johannesburg
- Years active: 1984–present
- Known for: Modelling; acting; singing
- Spouses: Richard Kruspe (m. 1999; div. 2005) Andrew Schupak (m. 2009)
- Children: Jeff
- Website: caronbernstein.com

Caron Bernstein (born 16 August 1970) is a South African model, actress and singer.

== Early life and career ==
Caron Bernstein was born in Johannesburg. She majored in painting while studying at the School of the Arts in Johannesburg. At the age of fourteen, she was awarded a modeling contract with Ford Models. At 23, Bernstein changed her focus from modeling to music, signing three record deals with major labels by the time she was 26.

Bernstein returned to visual art in the early 2000s, focusing on portraits that attempt to capture the darker aspects of the subject's character. Her work has included victims of suicide, anorexia and alopecia. She has described her style as "surrealistic anime".

In August 2007, she held an exhibition called Unbreakable Surrealism at the World Culture Center in Chelsea, New York. One of her works was a portrait of her ex-husband, Rammstein member Richard Kruspe, with a bullet through his head. Bernstein stated that the work was a response to Kruspe's alleged infidelity and abusiveness.

In December 2017 Bernstein publicly alleged that fashion photographer Terry Richardson sexually assaulted her during a 2003 photo shoot at his Lower East Side studio. Richardson denied the allegations saying that any contact had been consensual.

== Personal life ==
Berstein married Rammstein guitarist Richard Kruspe on October 29, 1999 in a Jewish ceremony. They separated in 2004.

In 2010 she reportedly married to financier Andrew Schupak. They have a son named Jeff.

She has a younger sister, Topaz Page-Green and a brother, Peter who died by suicide in 1998.

Bernstein lives and works in New York City with her husband Andrew Schupak and son Jett.

== Filmography ==
- Indiscretion (101) (2005) – Kristin
- Operation Midnight Climax (2002) – Kali 'Bondgirl' Bond
- Red Shoe Diaries 18: The Game (2000) (V) – Lily (segment: "The Game")
- Business for Pleasure (1997) – Isabel
- Who's the Man? (1993) – Kelly
- Waxwork II: Lost in Time (1992) – The Master's Girl

== Television ==
- "Red Shoe Diaries" – Art of Loneliness (1996) (TV episode) – Frances
- "Red Shoe Diaries" – The Game (1994) (TV episode) – Lily

== See also ==
- Richard Kruspe
- Rammstein
- Ford Models
- Topaz Page-Green
- V (American magazine)
