= Ben Grosse =

American record producer and mixer

- Birth name: Benjamin Boaz Grosse
- Occupation(s): Audio mixer, record producer
- Years active: 1979–present
- Website: themixroom.com

Ben Grosse is an American record producer and mixer. Grosse has mixed and produce albums for numerous music industry acts, primary in the heavy metal and hard rock genres. His credits include Dream Theater, Marilyn Manson, Sevendust, Disturbed, Breaking Benjamin, Filter, Fuel, Depeche Mode, Richard Barone, Alter Bridge, Red, Vertical Horizon, Love and Death, Starset, Hollywood Undead, Ben Folds, Thirty Seconds to Mars, Underoath, and Vattica, among others.

He has produced the songs "Higher Ground" by Red Hot Chili Peppers, "Ready to Go" by Republica, "Graduate" (from the Can't Hardly Wait soundtrack) by Third Eye Blind, and "She Don't Use Jelly" by the Flaming Lips. He also co-produced the Billboard number-one song "Everything You Want" by Vertical Horizon. He owns the North Hollywood-based music studio complex The Mix Room.
