= Book of Love discography =

- Studio albums: 4
- Compilation albums: 3
- Singles: 14
- Promo only singles: 1
- Music videos: 9
- Music video appearances: 3
- Other appearances: 42+

The Book of Love discography consists of four studio albums, three compilation album, fourteen singles, and one promo only single released on Sire Records, or Reprise Records, as well as nine music videos. The band has had their songs appear on more than forty compilations, as well as three music videos on three various video compilations.

Book of Love are an electronic music group formed in 1983, in Philadelphia, Pennsylvania and later based out of New York City. The group's line-up is Susan Ottaviano (lead vocals), Ted Ottaviano (keyboards, programming, vocals, chief songwriter), Jade Lee (keyboards, percussion, vocals) and Lauren Roselli (keyboards, vocals).

Since their debut in 1986, Book of Love have had their biggest success on the US dance charts, placing seven singles in the Billboard Hot Dance Club Play chart between 1985 and 1993. In February, 2001 — sixteen years after its first dance chart entry — Book of Love had its first number-one hit on the US dance chart when "Boy", a track originally from its debut album, was remixed and re-released as the lead single from their greatest hits collection, I Touch Roses: The Best of Book of Love. The group's largest exposure on pop radio was with the song "Pretty Boys And Pretty Girls", which became Book of Love's only Hot 100 entry, peaking at number 90 in 1988. The band have had two albums, Lullaby and Candy Carol, enter the Billboard 200, peaking at no. 156 and no. 174 respectively.

== Albums ==
=== Studio albums ===
Year	Album	Album details	^{U.S. albums}
1986	Book of Love	Release date: 1 April 1986; Label: Sire Records, I Square Records; Formats: LP, Cassette	—
1988	Lullaby	Release date: 21 June 1988; Label: Sire Records, I Square Records; Formats: CD, LP, Cassette	156
1991	Candy Carol	Release date: 23 January 1991; Label: Sire Records, Warner Bros. Records, I Square Records; Formats: CD, LP, Cassette	174
1993	Lovebubble	Release date: 15 June 1993; Label: Sire Records, Warner Bros. Records, I Square Records; Formats: CD, Cassette	—
"—" denotes that album did not chart.

=== Compilation albums ===
Year	Album	Album details	^{U.S. albums}
2001	I Touch Roses: The Best of Book of Love	Release date: 13 March 2001; Label: Reprise Records; Formats: CD	—
2016	MMXVI - Book of Love - The 30th Anniversary Collection	Release date: 17 June 2016; Label: Sire/Rhino Records; Formats: DL	—
2018	The Sire Years: 1985-1993	Release date: 19 January 2018; Label: Notefornote Music/Rhino Records; Formats: CD	—
"—" denotes that album did not chart.

== Single releases ==
=== Singles ===
Year	Single	Peak positions			Album
Year	Single	US	US Alt.	US Dance	Album
1985	"Boy"	—	—	7	Book of Love
1985	"I Touch Roses"	—	—	8	Book of Love
1986	"You Make Me Feel So Good"	—	—	—	Book of Love
1987	"Modigliani (Lost in Your Eyes)"	—	—	17	Book of Love
1988	"Pretty Boys and Pretty Girls"	90	—	5	Lullaby
1989	"Lullaby"	—	—	27	Lullaby
1989	"Witchcraft"	—	—	—	Lullaby
1991	"Alice Everyday"	—	21	21	Candy Carol
1991	"Sunny Day"	—	—	—	Candy Carol
1991	"Counting the Rosaries"	—	—	—	Candy Carol
1993	"Boy Pop"	—	—	4	Lovebubble
1993	"Hunny Hunny" / "Chatterbox (Pt. 2)"	—	—	—	Lovebubble
2001	"Boy" (Remixes)	—	—	1	I Touch Roses: The Best of Book of Love
2016	"All Girl Band"	—	—	—	Book of Love - MMXVI The 30th Anniversary Collection
"—" denotes that single did not chart.

=== Promotional singles ===
Year	Single	Album
2001	"I Touch Roses" (Markus Schulz Remixes)	Non-album promotional single

== Videography ==
=== Music videos ===
Year	Title	Director
1985	"Boy"	n/a
1986	"You Make Me Feel So Good"	n/a
1988	"Pretty Boys And Pretty Girls"	Carlos Grosso
1991	"Alice Everyday"	Rocky Schenck
1993	"Boy Pop"	n/a
1993	"Hunny Hunny"	n/a
2001	"Boy (Big Red Mix)"	n/a
2016	"All Girl Band" (Official Lyric Video)	n/a
2017	"Lullaby"	Ronaldo Aguiar

=== Music video appearances ===
Year	Music video	Compilation	Notes
1991	"Alice Everyday"	Just Say Yes 1	Warner Reprise Video – 38215–3; Format: VHS
1993	"Boy Pop"	Dance Hits - July 1993	ET/VideoLink – REEL 5009; Format: VHS
2001	"Boy (Big Red Video Remix)"	Just Beat 03 - WMC Sampler	Warner Bros. Records – PRO-CD-100546 Reprise Records – PRO-CD-100546; Format: Enhanced CD

== Other appearances ==
Year	Song	Album	Artist(s)	Notes
1983	"Henna"	I'd Rather Be In Philadelphia	Various	Compilation of local Philadelphia bands. Produced by Susan Ottaviano.; Label: Burn Potential Records; Formats: Vinyl LP; First Book of Love song released.
1985	"Book of Love"	European Club Sampler	Various	German promo compilation.; Label: WEA - PRO 655; Format: Vinyl LP
1987	"Modigliani (Lost In Your Eyes)" (Single Remix)	Planes, Trains and Automobiles soundtrack	Various	Film soundtrack.; Label: MCA Records/Paramount Pictures; Format: Vinyl LP, promo cassette, promo CD
1987	"We Three Kings"	Yulesville	Various	Christmas promo compilation.; Label: Warner Bros. Records; Format: Vinyl LP
1987	"Modigliani (Lost In Your Eyes)" (Mike Carroll Mix)	Series 6, Issue 5	Various	Promo remix compilation.; Label: Hot Tracks - SA 6–5; Format: 2 x 12" Vinyl; Remixed by Mike Carroll
1988	"Tubular Bells/Pretty Boys And Pretty Girls" (Regan's House Medley)	Just Say Yo (Volume 2 of Just Say Yes)	Various	Compilation of Sire artists.; Label: Sire Records; Format: CD
1988	"Pretty Boys And Pretty Girls" (Totally Tubular Mix)	Volume 1, Issue 12	Various	Promo compilation of remixes.; Label: Prime Cuts; Format: 2 x 12" Vinyl; Remixed by Howard Prince and Phillip Columbus
1989	"Witchcraft" (7" Remix)	Follow Our Trax Volume II	Various	Promo compilation of Warner Bros. artists.; Format: CD, Vinyl LP; Label: Warner Bros. Records
1989	"Tubular Bells/Pretty Boys And Pretty Girls"	Rhythm Stick 1-1	Various	Promo compilation of remixes.; Label: Rhythm Stick; Format: 2 x 12" Vinyl
1989	"Witchcraft" (The Warlock Edit)	Rhythm Stick 1-8	Various	Promo compilation of remixes.; Label: Rhythm Stick; Format: 2 x 12" Vinyl
1991	"Alice Everyday"	Check It Out!	Various	Promo compilation of Warner Bros. Records artists.; Label: WEA; Format: CD
1991	"Turn The World"	Follow Our Trax Six: Fluid Formations	Various	Promo compilation of Warner Bros. Records artists.; Label: Warner Bros. Records; Format: CD
1991	"Alice Everyday" (The Monotony Lines Edit)	Volume 3, Issue 9	Various	Promo compilation of remixes.; Label: Prime Cuts; Format: 2 x 12" Vinyl; Edited by J.R. Clements
1992	"Boy"	Sire Records and Out Magazine Present - Get Out	Various	Promo compilation of Warner Bros. Records artists.; Label: Sire Records; Format: CD
1993	"Hunny Hunny"	Music Matters Volume 5	Various	Promo compilation of by Details Magazine.; Label: Details Magazine; Format: 2 x CD
1993	"Boy Pop"	Boys United	Various	Promo compilation of by Sire Records artists.; Label: Sire Records; Format: CD
1994	"Enchanted"	Naked in New York: Music From The Motion Picture	Various	Film soundtrack.; Label: Sire Records; Format: CD
1995	"Lost Souls"	Technoclub - Classix Vol. 1	Various	Club music compilation.; Label: Castle Communications; Format: 2 x CD
1996	"I Touch Roses"	Retro Night	Various	Compilation of Warner Bros. artists.; Label: Warner Music Canada; Format: CD
1998	"Book of Love"	Wave Republic - Wave For A New Nation	Various	Philippines compilation.; Label: Spin Circle Records; Format: CD
1998	"Modigliani (Lost In Your Eyes)"	Wave Republic - The Second Strike: A Tribute To All Wavers	Various	Philippines compilation.; Label: Spin Circle Records; Format: CD
1998	"Pretty Boys And Pretty Girls"	Runway Hits - Music From The Catwalk	Various	Fashion runway compilation.; Label: Rhino Records; Format: CD
1999	"Boy" (Razormaid Mix)	Member's Revenge 1: Discontented!	Various	Compilation of Razormaid remixes.; Label: Razormaid Records; Format: CD; Remixed by John Bice
2000	"Modigliani (Lost In Your Eyes)" (Razormaid Mix)	Member's Revenge 3: Alienated	Various	Compilation of Razormaid remixes.; Label: Razormaid Records; Format: CD; Remixed by Matt Hite
2000	"Boy" (Extended Mix)	Flashback '80s Club Classics	Various	Compilation of club remixes.; Label: Flashback Records; Format: CD
2000	"Tubular Bells"	Chorus Girl 7	Various	Philippines compilation.; Label: Hide And Seek Records Ltd.; Format: CD
2001	"I Touch Roses"	American Eagle Outfitters: Summer9ine	Various	Compilation available only at American Eagle Outfitters.; Label: Warner Bros. Records; Format: CD
2001	"Tubular Bells" (Edit)	Howie Loves WBR	Various	Compilation of Warner Bros. artists.; Label: Warner Bros. Records; Format: 2 x CD
2001	"Tubular Bells"	Maxi Pop Oro	Various	Spain compilation.; Label: Contraseña Records; Format: 2 x CD
2001	"I Touch Roses" (Markus Schulz Dark Rose Mix)	Reprise Records Presents Music For The 12th Annual GLAAD Media Awards	Various	GLAAD compilation.; Label: Reprise Records; Format: CD
2001	"I Touch Roses" (Markus Schulz Dark Rose Mix)	Just Beat 03 - WMC Sampler	Various	Compilation of Warner Bros. artists.; Label: Warner Bros. Records; Format: CD
2004	"I Touch Roses" (Markus Schulz Dark Rose Mix)	Retro:Remixed - Rare & Extended	Various	Compilation of various remixes.; Label: Hi-Bias Records; Format: CD
2004	"I Touch Roses" (Full Bloom Version)	Retro:Active - Rare & Remixed	Various	Compilation of various remixes.; Label: Hi-Bias Records; Format: CD; Remixed by Daniel Miller
2005	"I Touch Roses"	New Wave Essentials	Various	Philippines compilation.; Label: Warner Music Philippines; Format: CD
2005	"Boy"	Just Say Sire: The Sire Records Story	Various	Compilation of Sire artists.; Label: Sire Records; Format: 3 x CD
2005	"Boy" (Peter Rauhofer Club Mix)	Retro:Remixed2 - Rare & Refashioned	Various	Compilation of various remixes.; Label: Hi-Bias Records; Format: CD
2005	"Witchcraft" (Extended Mix)	Retro:Active3 - Rare & Remixed	Various	Compilation of various remixes.; Label: Hi-Bias Records; Format: CD
2005	"Boy" (Original Mix)	Queer As Folk - Club Babylon	Various	Compilation of various remixes.; Label: Silver Label; Format: 2 x CD
2006	"Boy" (DJ Irene Rockstar Mix)	Future Retro	Various	Compilation of various remixes.; Label: Rhino Records; Format: CD; Remixed by DJ Irene
2009	"Tubular Bells" (Edit)	Puro Techno	Various	Spain compilation.; Label: Contraseña Records; Format: 3 x CD
2010	"Modigliani (Lost In Your Eyes)" (I Dream of Jeanne Mix)	Movie Klub80 Episode 4	Various	Polish compilation.; Label: 4everMUSIC/KLUB80 Records; Format: CD
2011	"Boy" (Extended Mix)	Blank & Jones Present So80s (Soeighties) 4	Various	Compilation of various remixes.; Label: Soundcolours; Format: 2 x CD

== See also ==
- List of artists who reached number one on the US Dance chart
