= Lullaby Tour =

1988–89 concert tour by Book of Love

- Tour by Book of Love
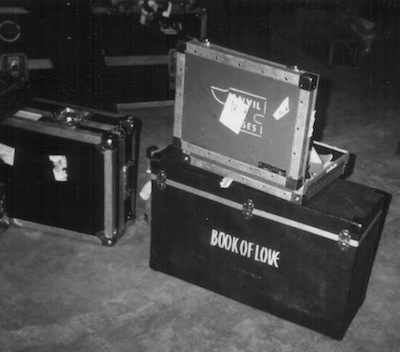
- Location: United States
- Associated album: Lullaby
- Start date: 17 December 1988 (warm-up); 23 February 1989 (official)
- End date: 31 October 1989
- Legs: 4
- No. of shows: 64

Book of Love concert chronology
- Club Tour '86 (1986–87); Lullaby Tour (1988–89); Candy Carol Tour (1991)

The Lullaby Tour was a concert tour by American electronic music group Book of Love, in support of the act's second studio album, Lullaby, which was released in July 1988. The band had originally intended to tour in the fall of 1988, but the illness of a band member delayed the tour until 1989. The second single from the album and title track "Lullaby" was released on January 4, 1989, to coincide with the tour.

The band played several warm up shows in N.Y.C., Texas, and Oklahoma in late December 1988, with the official U.S. tour beginning in late February 1989, and lasting for four months, ending in June 1989. The band played two shows around Halloween in Baltimore and D.C. to promote the "Witchcraft" single.

The first show of the official tour took place at Club Axis in Boston, Massachusetts, on February 23, 1989. Throughout the tour, various local bands in each city functioned as the opening act. The band took two weeks out of their tour schedule in mid-April to remix the track "Witchcraft", and another week in May to edit the song for the next single. The tour concluded with the two consecutive nights at the 9:30 Club in Washington, D.C., on June 29, 1989.

Props used on the tour were Lite-Brites and large framed portrait paintings of the band painted by Susan Ottaviano. The set included a cover of ABBA's "S.O.S.", and also the band's cover of Mike Oldfield's "Tubular Bells", which was performed as a separate song, instead of a medley with "Pretty Boys and Pretty Girls". For the encore performance of "Witchcraft", the band donned witches' hats.

The setlist was evenly divided between new Lullaby album tracks (up to eight new songs), and tracks from their debut, Book of Love.

== Setlist ==
Handwritten setlist from the tour

Sample of a setlist from the tour.

1. "Pretty Boys and Pretty Girls"
2. "Melt My Heart"
3. "Happy Day"
4. "Modigliani (Lost in Your Eyes)"
5. "Oranges and Lemons"
6. "You Look Through Me"
7. "Boy"
8. "You Make Me Feel So Good"
9. "With a Little Love" (Ted Ottaviano on lead vocals)
10. "S.O.S." (ABBA cover)
11. "Book of Love"
12. "I Touch Roses"
  Encore
13. "Tubular Bells"
14. "Lullaby"
15. "Witchcraft"

== Tour dates ==
List of Book of Love's Lullaby Tour dates.

Date	City	Country	Venue
Pre-Lullaby Tour warm-up dates
17 December 1988	New York City	United States	Pyramid Club
27 December 1988	Beaumont	United States	Rhinestones
28 December 1988	San Antonio	United States	Rock Wave
29 December 1988	Austin	United States	Curfew
30 December 1988	Dallas	United States	Club Clearview
31 December 1988	Houston	United States	Fame City
31 December 1988	Houston	United States	Club 6400
2 January 1989	Norman	United States	The Edge
U.S.A. Lullaby Tour, Leg #1
23 February 1989	Boston	United States	Club Axis
24 February 1989	New York City	United States	The Ritz
25 February 1989	Ocean City	United States	Scandals
26 February 1989	Washington, D.C.	United States	9:30 Club
27 February 1989	Washington, D.C.	United States	9:30 Club
28 February 1989	Philadelphia	United States	The Chestnut Cabaret
2 March 1989	Pittsburgh	United States	Metropol
3 March 1989	Detroit	United States	St. Andrews
4 March 1989	Rochester	United States	University of Rochester
6 March 1989	Cleveland	United States	Fantasy Theatre
7 March 1989	Chicago	United States	Cabaret Metro
8 March 1989	Minneapolis	United States	First Avenue
9 March 1989	Milwaukee	United States	Bermuda Club
10 March 1989	Grinnell	United States	Grinnell College
12 March 1989	Galveston	United States	KRBE Spring Break
13 March 1989	Houston	United States	X-cess
14 March 1989	New Orleans	United States	Tipitina's
15 March 1989	Beaumont	United States	Images
16 March 1989	San Antonio	United States	Tramps
17 March 1989	Austin	United States	Curfew
18 March 1989	Dallas	United States	Club Clearview
20 March 1989	Tulsa	United States	Beat Club
21 March 1989	Stillwater	United States	Stillwater
22 March 1989	Norman	United States	The Edge
24 March 1989	El Paso	United States	Mesa Inn Ballroom
26 March 1989	San Diego	United States	Bacchanel
27 March 1989	Laguna Hills	United States	Post Nuclear
28 March 1989	Los Angeles	United States	The Palace
30 March 1989	San Francisco	United States	The Fillmore
31 March 1989	Santa Clara	United States	One Step Beyond
2 April 1989	Coeur d'Alene	United States	n/a
4 April 1989	Seattle	United States	Oz
5 April 1989	Vancouver	United States	Changes Niteclub
7 April 1989	Salt Lake City	United States	49th Street Galleria
9 April 1989	Phoenix	United States	After The Gold Rush
11 April 1989	Denver		Rock Island
U.S.A. Lullaby Tour, Leg #2
2 May 1989	Virginia Beach	United States	Peabody's
3 May 1989	Richmond	United States	The Library
4 May 1989	Baltimore	United States	Max's On Broadway
6 May 1989	Ocean City	United States	Scandals
7 May 1989	Charlotte	United States	Pterodactyl
9 May 1989	Jacksonville	United States	Einstein A Go Go
11 May 1989	Orlando	United States	Visage
12 May 1989	Orlando	United States	Visage
13 May 1989	Tampa	United States	Masquerade
15 May 1989	West Palm Beach	United States	Respectable Street
16 May 1989	Miami	United States	Club Nu
17 May 1989	Gainesville	United States	n/a
18 May 1989	Atlanta	United States	The Cotton Club
19 May 1989	Athens	United States	Uptown
28 May 1989	San Francisco	United States	Concert Against AIDS Benefit; The Gift Center
29 May 1989	San Jose	United States	Cactus Club
27 June 1989	Philadelphia	United States	Kirks
28 June 1989	Washington, D.C.	United States	9:30 Club
29 June 1989	Washington, D.C.		9:30 Club
"Witchcraft" dates
30 October 1989	Baltimore	United States	Max's On Broadway
31 October 1989	Washington, D.C.	United States	9:30 Club

== Performers ==
- Susan Ottaviano – lead vocals
- Ted Ottaviano – keyboards, tubular bells, melodica, vocals
- Lauren Roselli – keyboards, vocals
- Jade Lee – keyboards, percussion, vocals

== Crew ==
- Jerry Vaccarino – tour manager
- Craig Overbay – production manager, house sound
- Rich Nardone – stage manager
