= Future Retro =

Compilation album
- Released: 2006
- Length: 78:11
- Compiler: Rhino Records

Future Retro is a compilation remix album released in 2006 consisting of new wave and alternative artists hits from the 1980s, including the Cure, Yaz, INXS, Depeche Mode, Erasure and others. It was remixed by several well known deejays and producers such as Richard X, the Crystal Method, Way Out West, Tiga, Adam Freeland and others.

== Track listing ==
=== CD and digital download version ===
1. The Cure / "The Walk" (Infusion Mix) – 5:36
2. Yaz / "Situation" (Richard X Remix) – 5:51
3. Echo & the Bunnymen / "Lips Like Sugar" (Way Out West Remix Edit) (Jody Wisternoff, Nick Warren, Jess Alekzandr) – 4:52
4. INXS / "Need You Tonight" (Static Avenger Mix Edit) – 4:21
5. Depeche Mode / "Shake the Disease" (Tiga Remix) – 6:48
6. Erasure / "A Little Respect" (Jaded Alliance 'Electrospect' Remix) – 6:31
7. Howard Jones / "New Song" (Peter Black & Hardrock Striker Mix Edit) – 3:26
8. Alphaville / "Forever Young" (Hamel Album Mix) – 4:45
9. New Order / "Bizarre Love Triangle" (The Crystal Method Extended Mix) – 6:05
10. Grandmaster Flash & Melle Mel / "White Lines (Don't Don't Do It)" (Elite Force Mix) – 7:35
11. Devo / "Girl U Want" (Black Light Odyssey Mix) – 3:47
12. B-Movie / "Nowhere Girl" (Adam Freeland Mix) – 7:30
13. Book of Love / "Boy" (DJ Irene Rockstar Mix) – 4:27
14. Morrissey / "Suedehead" (Sparks Remix) – 6:37

=== Vinyl version ===
Side A:

1. The Cure / "The Walk" (Infusion 12" Remix) – 8:59
2. New Order / "Bizarre Love Triangle" (Richard X 12" Mix) – 7:04

Side B:

1. Depeche Mode / "Shake the Disease" (Tiga Remix) – 6:47
2. B-Movie / "Nowhere Girl" (Adam Freeland Mix) – 7:31
3. INXS / "Need You Tonight" (Static Revenger Mix) – 6:41

Side C:

1. Echo & the Bunnymen / "Lips Like Sugar" (Way Out West Remix) (Jody Wisternoff, Nick Warren, Jess Alekzandr) – 7:32
2. Howard Jones / "New Song" (Peter Black & Hardrock Striker Mix) – 7:42

Side D:

1. Grandmaster Flash & Melle Mel / "White Lines (Don't Don't Do It)" (Elite Force Mix) – 7:39
2. Yaz / "Situation" (Future Funk Squad's Downstairs & Fabric Mix) – 6:38
3. Alphaville / "Forever Young" (Hamel Club Mix) – 7:41
