= I Touch Roses: The Best of Book of Love =

Compilation album by Book of Love
- Released: 13 March 2001
- Recorded: 1985–1993, 2000
- Genre: New wave, synthpop
- Length: 59:33
- Label: Reprise Records
- Producer: Ivan Ivan; Flood; Ted Ottaviano; Ben Grosse

Book of Love chronology
Lovebubble (1993)	I Touch Roses: The Best of Book of Love (2001)

Singles from I Touch Roses: The Best of Book of Love
- 1. "Boy (Peter Rauhofer Remix)" Released: 31 January 2001

Professional ratings
Review scores
Source	Rating
AllMusic	4/5 stars
Spin	(positive)
Time Out New York	(mixed)

I Touch Roses: The Best of Book of Love is a best of compilation album by American synthpop and electronic band Book of Love, released on March 13, 2001, by Reprise Records.

== History ==
In 2001, Reprise Records released Book of Love's first and only 'best of' collection: I Touch Roses: The Best of Book of Love, effectively fulfilling the band's Warner Bros. recording contract. It had been eight years since the release of Lovebubble, the band's eclectic final album. In the late '90s, with the emerging electroclash scene and electronic dance music back in vogue, the musical environment was ready for Book of Love again. "We realized there isn't really all that much about Book of Love out there, and we needed to put together some type of career retrospective. If we didn't do it, no one would. So we started working on it, and finally we're here," stated Ted Ottaviano in 2001.

In 2000, the band worked away at Sound Umbrella studio in New York City, preparing new songs for the release. Three new songs were recorded for the album. "Getting Faster", penned by Susan Ottaviano and Ted Ottaviano, was a dance pop number with lyrics of "slowing down and getting faster...blue sky won't go up and up." New track "Try", a collaboration between Jade Lee and Ted Ottaviano, featured both Susan Ottaviano and Jade on lead vocals, and a classic Book of Love arrangement. "It's In Your Eyes" was an old track that dated back to the very beginnings of Book of Love. Taking things full circle, the song was the first song originally written by Susan and Ted Ottaviano, and the band resurrected it and recorded it for the first time for inclusion on the compilation. It had only ever been performed live, but its inclusion is a "real gift to the earliest fans". Ted Ottaviano stated, "This is a perfect time for a retrospective. We've added great new material and we can look back at our whole body of work with real objectivity."

Another new production on the compilation was a reworking of the song "Sunny Day". Ted Ottaviano produced the new version which included guitar from Lori Lindsay, who would later collaborate with Ted Ottaviano and Lauren (Roselli) Johnson as lead vocalist and guitarist in The Myrmidons.

I Touch Roses: The Best of Book of Love was released on March 13, 2001, with sixteen tracks spanning the group's entire catalog. The compilation album failed to chart on the Billboard charts. The only singles omitted from the collection were "Witchcraft" and "Boy Pop", along with fan favorite album cuts such as "With A Little Love", "Turn The World", and "Sound and Vision".

The only single released from the record was a newly remixed version of "Boy" by DJ-Producer Peter Rauhofer in January 2001. "Boy", originally an Ivan Ivan production from the band's eponymous debut, was given a new life with additional new production from Peter. "Boy" (Peter Rauhofer Remix) became a huge club hit, peaking at no. 1 on the Billboard Hot Dance Club Play chart. Speaking about the remix, Ted Ottaviano stated, "Peter was a huge fan of the song, and he wanted to do it. It really has the essence of the original."

Double 12 inch vinyl promo copies of the "Boy" remixes were already making an impact in the clubs at the end of 2000. Between the two formats of 2 x 12 inch vinyl and CD, there are 10 new remix versions of "Boy", all done by Peter Rauhofer, Headrillaz, RPO, Dubaholics, and Sound Bisquit. A second remix of "Boy" also made it to no. 2 on the Billboard Hot Dance Club Play chart.

A promotional video (Big Red Mix) of the remix of "Boy" was released featuring montage live footage of the band's performance of "Boy" from the Concert Against Aids Benefit at The Gift Center, San Francisco, on May 28, 1989.

Due to the success of the "Boy" remixes, Reprise commissioned a new remix of "I Touch Roses" by Markus Schulz to further promote the compilation. A promotional 12 inch of "I Touch Roses" (Markus Schulz Dark Rose Remix) backed with an instrumental remix version was released in the spring of 2001. In additional support of the greatest hits collection, the band temporarily reunited to play a small scale club tour visited cities spanning coast to coast in 2001. Following the small tour, the band went their separate ways once again.

== Release and reception ==
I Touch Roses: The Best of Book of Love was released on March 13, 2001, with sixteen tracks in the CD format (digital download became available later). The compilation album failed to chart on the Billboard charts. The only single taken from the album was "Boy (Peter Rauhofer Remix)", released in January 2001.

AllMusic gave the compilation an editor rating of 4 stars out of 5, with reviewer Michael Gallucci stating, "It's an unassuming and occasionally satisfying trip into spare synth-pop and sunny melodies, both heavy on nostalgia. The best songs -- like "Boy" and "Alice Everyday" -- even possess an innocent charm that sounds years away from the modern-day electro-rave scene."

Spin's Barry Walters gave the collection a positive review writing, "This three-woman, one-man band once suggested Depeche Ramones. Now the crafty twee keyboard punk on this great retrospective rolls out like Les Tigres Digitales."

Time Out New York's Smith Galtney gave the collection mixed review stating, "I Touch Roses isn't half as good as the group's debut, but it's still an irresistible document of a band falling through the cracks. If BOL sounded like nothing in its day, certainly nothing has sounded like it since; it's as if the group's music exists in a cultural vacuum, as little here sounds embarrassingly dated."

== Track listing ==
No.	Title	Writer(s)	Length
1.	"I Touch Roses"	Theodore Ottaviano	3:21
2.	"Boy"	Theodore Ottaviano	2:57
3.	"Modigliani (Lost In Your Eyes)" (Single remix)	Jade Lee/Susan Ottaviano/Ted Ottaviano	3:52
4.	"Alice Everyday"	Theodore Ottaviano	3:38
5.	"Hunny Hunny" (Radio remix)	Theodore Ottaviano	4:08
6.	"Getting Faster"	Susan Ottaviano/Ted Ottaviano	3:17
7.	"Pretty Boys and Pretty Girls" (Single version)	Theodore Ottaviano	4:48
8.	"You Make Me Feel So Good" (Single remix)	Susan Ottaviano/Ted Ottaviano	3:58
9.	"Sunny Day" (2001 version)	Ted Ottaviano	3:25
10.	"Chatterbox Pt. 2"	Jade Lee/Theodore Ottaviano	3:31
11.	"Tubular Bells"	Mike Oldfield	4:09
12.	"Counting the Rosaries"	Lauren Roselli/Theodore Ottaviano	3:29
13.	"Lullaby"	Theodore Ottaviano	4:59
14.	"Try"	Jade Lee/Theodore Ottaviano	3:44
15.	"Boy" (Peter Rauhofer remix)	Theodore Ottaviano	3:11
16.	"It's In Your Eyes"	Susan Ottaviano/Theodore Ottaviano	3:06

== Personnel ==
- Jade Lee – keyboards, percussion, backing vocals [lead vocals on "Chatterbox (Pt. 2)" and co-lead vocals on "Try"]
- Ted Ottaviano – keyboards, piano, programming, tubular bells, backing vocals (lead vocals on "Sunny Day")
- Susan Ottaviano – vocals
- Lauren Roselli – keyboards, backing vocals (lead vocals on "Counting The Rosaries" and "Hunny Hunny")

Additional credits:

- Tracks 1, 2, 3, 8, produced by Ivan Ivan
- Tracks 7, 11, 13, produced by Flood and Ted Otavianno
- Tracks 4, 9, 12, produced by Ben Grosse and Ted Ottaviano
- Tracks 5, 6, 10, 14, 16, produced by Ted Otavianno
- Track 15 produced by Ivan Ivan with additional production by Peter Rauhofer for Unique Productions, NYC (Edited by Jon Masciana)
- "Getting Faster", "Try", and "It's In Your Eyes" recorded at Sound Umbrella, NYC, 2000
- Mastered by George Marino at Sterling Sound, NYC
- Remix and additional production on "Modigliani (Lost In Your Eyes)" [Single Remix] by Theodore Ottaviano
- Remix and additional production on "Hunny Hunny (Radio Remix)" by Ben Grosse
- "You Make Me Feel So Good" (Single Remix) remixed by Jellybean and Ivan Ivan
- "Sunny Day" (2001 Version) remixed by Ted Ottaviano
- Guitar on "Sunny Day" (2001 Version) by Lori Lindsay
- "Getting Faster" and "Try", mixed by Doug McKean at World of Beauty, NYC
- Art Direction by Ethan Trask
- Photography by Frank Ockenfels III

== Chart positions ==
=== Album ===
Year	Chart	Peak position	Total weeks
2001	U.S. Billboard 200	—	—

=== Singles ===
Year	Song	Chart peak positions
Year	Song	US Club Play
2001	"Boy"	1
2001	"Boy (Remix)"	2

"—" denotes a release that did not chart.
