= Lullaby (Book of Love album) =

Studio album by Book of Love
- Released: June 21, 1988
- Recorded: D+D Recording, NYC; Unique Recording Studios, NYC; Cathedral of St. John the Divine
- Genre: New wave, synth-pop
- Length: 38:21; 75:51 (2009 reissue)
- Label: Sire
- Producer: Flood & Ted Ottaviano

Book of Love chronology
Book of Love (1986)	Lullaby (1988)	Candy Carol (1991)

Singles from Lullaby
- 1. "Pretty Boys And Pretty Girls" Released: 24 May 1988; 2. "Lullaby" Released: 4 January 1989; 3. "Witchcraft" Released: 15 July 1989

Professional ratings
Review scores
Source	Rating
AllMusic	2.5/5 stars
PopMatters	7/10 stars

Lullaby is the second studio album by American synth-pop band Book of Love, released on June 21, 1988, by Sire Records.

== History ==
New York-based synthpop quartet Book of Love released their follow up record two years after their eponymous debut Book Of Love. Promotional duties and non-stop touring in support of Depeche Mode's Black Celebration Tour had kept Book of Love from entering the studio to lay down ideas for their second record. In a 2009 interview, Ted Ottaviano stated, "It's the classic story. We weren't quite sure where the first album would take us, and it ended up taking us on a ride. But then we had to turn right around and write and record songs for the follow-up. I'm not sure we had enough distance, enough time, to fully grasp what this meant or entailed." In the spring of 1987, the band was finally able to lay down some demos for the next record, writing the new songs between March through August.

In late September 1987, the band eventually convened at D+D Recording and Unique Recording Studios in New York to record with esteemed producer Mark Ellis, aka Flood (Depeche Mode, Erasure, Nitzer Ebb, Nine Inch Nails), who had just produced Erasure's The Circus the previous year, along with engineering on U2's The Joshua Tree. Flood co-produced the record with Ted Ottaviano. Reflecting on the recording in 2009, Susan Ottaviano stated, "It was great to be part of some of Ted's Cecil B. DeMille-styled productions. We had a full orchestra and a bagpipe player wearing a kilt for the song "Lullaby". We also recorded the organ at Cathedral of St. John the Divine (NYC) for "With A Little Love". It was such an amazing experience." The cathedral organ drenched, "With A Little Love", marked the first Book Of Love song to feature Ted Ottaviano on lead vocals. On recording with Flood, Ted Ottaviano stated, "We spent one night there, from about 10 pm to 6 am. Flood miked the entire cathedral. He was totally game for what we wanted to do." Recording in New York ended on December 18, 1987, with the band reuniting with Flood on January 1, 1988 to record vocals at the Great Hall at Hansa Tonstudios Berlin. Flood mixed "Melt My Heart" and "Champagne Wishes" and the recording of the album was finished. The remaining eight tracks were mixed by Alan Meyerson in L.A. in February, and the album mastered in March at Sterling Sound.

Preceding the album, the first single, "Pretty Boys And Pretty Girls" was released on May 24, 1988. "Pretty Boys And Pretty Girls" became one of the first songs ever to address the issue of the AIDS epidemic with its lyric of "Strangers in the night exchanging glances, but sex is dangerous, I don't take my chances...safe sex, safe sex." The song became the band's highest charting single at no. 90 in the Billboard Hot 100, and the only moment crossing over into mainstream pop. In the dance clubs, the song was a smash, and made it to no. 5 on the Hot Dance Club Play Chart, spending 11 weeks on the chart. A music video for "Pretty Boys And Pretty Girls" was shot by director Carlos Grosso and released to promote the new album.

Book of Love's second album Lullaby was released on June 21, 1988, and spent ten weeks on the Billboard 200, peaking at No. 156, the highest album placement of their career. The album cover artwork features a photograph from 1872, titled "Cupid Considering", by Julia Margaret Cameron, "a photograph study of Rachel Gurney with wings both arms folded over each other leaning on ledge", from the International Museum of Photography at George Eastman House. The band continued the tradition of using Roman numerals to denote the release year, MCMLXXXVIII (1988), this time appearing vertically on the album cover.

Opening the album is a cover of Mike Oldfield's "Tubular Bells", originally made famous as the theme from the horror movie The Exorcist. For the track, the band sampled Lauren Roselli channeling Linda Blair's role as Regan, crying "Mother, make it stop!" It flows seamlessly into the second track on the album, the first single, "Pretty Boys And Pretty Girls". The two tracks were also remixed into a 14:25 minute extended medley version for the single.

The second single was the album's title track, "Lullaby", featuring a galloping bassline, bagpipe drones and solo, lullaby vocal harmonies, and lush strings by a string section of 20 Juilliard students. The song peaked at no. 27 on the Billboard Hot Dance Club Play Chart and spent seven weeks on the chart. Over time, the track has become one of Book of Love's signature songs among their catalogue.

The band had intended to tour in the fall of 1988, but the illness of a band member delayed the tour until 1989. In late December 1988, the band played several warm up shows including N.Y.C., five dates in Texas, and Norman, Oklahoma on January 2, 1989. To promote Lullaby, the band headlined their own Lullaby Tour of clubs in the spring of 1989 with various local acts opening in each city. The band's U.S. tour lasted for four months, with dates spanning February 23 through June 29, 1989. The band took two weeks out of their tour schedule in mid-April to remix the track "Witchcraft", and another week in May to edit the song for the next single.

The third and final single taken from the album was "Witchcraft" and released July 15, 1989. It was the only single from the album that failed to make the Billboard charts. The track samples the classic 60's TV series Bewitched, and also contains a chant of names of the witches/characters from the show..."Enchantra, Endora, Tabitha, Esmerelda, Clara, Hagatha". The song features quirky deadpan rap-style vocals from Susan Ottaviano, Jade Lee, and Lauren Roselli, incanting the ingredients for a love potion. When performing the song on the Lullaby Tour, the band donned witches' hats, making it a fan favorite of the band's live shows.

In 1990, the album track "With A Little Love" was re-recorded and remixed by Ben Grosse, and released on the "Alice Everyday" single as the '1990 Version'. The new version is more synthesized, and omits the cathedral organ altogether, as well as the female vocal part of "love, love, love" in the midsection.

Reflecting on the album in 2009, Ted Ottaviano stated, "Everyone deems our first album as 'our moment', but Lullaby was our only CHR record. We had the most fanfare with our second album as well as our biggest tour. Our own tour, in fact."..."I remember the plane ride home from Berlin to New York, after having mixed the album at Hansa, after six months of being in this Lullaby-bubble, working on the album day and night. I was sitting there in my seat, listening to the finished album on my Walkman, thinking, 'I'm not sure if we got it.' There was something so unbelievably pure and instinctually simple about the first album. There were growing pains with Lullaby."

In 2009, Lullaby was remastered and reissued by Collector's Choice/Noble Rot Records. The reissue featured five bonus rare remixes (most appearing on CD for the first time): "Pretty Girls And Pretty Boys" (Extended Mix), "Tubular Bells"/"Pretty Boys And Pretty Girls" (Regan's House Medley), "Lullaby" (Pleasant Dream Mix), "Witchcraft" (Extended Mix), and "Enchantra" (a b-side utilizing vocal parts from "Witchcraft").

== Release and reception ==
Lullaby was released on June 21, 1988, with ten tracks, featuring "a polished collection of well-crafted pop songs". Lullaby spent ten weeks on the Billboard 200, peaking at No. 156, the highest album placement of their career. Three singles were culled from the album: "Pretty Boys And Pretty Girls" in 1988, and "Lullaby" and "Witchcraft" in 1989.

AllMusic gave the album an editor rating of 2.5 stars out of 5, with William Ruhlmann's critique on the choice of producer, "Producer Flood (of Depeche Mode fame) brought his ominous, beat-heavy approach to the group's already street-smart disco persona, with the result that tracks like "Pretty Boys And Pretty Girls" had an urgency lacking on the more pop-oriented debut. This was not, however, the way to break Book of Love beyond the dance clubs, and Lullaby did little to advance their career."

PopMatters gave the reissue of Lullaby a 7/10, a tie score with their eponymous debut, Book of Love. Associate Music Editor Christel Loar noted, "By the release of 1988’s Lullaby, Book of Love’s signature sound had been distilled into pure sonic silver, and nowhere was this more apparent than on the opening track, a remake of “Tubular Bells”, the theme from The Exorcist."

== Track listing ==
Side one
No.	Title	Writer(s)	Length
1.	"Tubular Bells"	Mike Oldfield	3:00
2.	"Pretty Boys And Pretty Girls"	Theodore Ottaviano	4:26
3.	"Sea Of Tranquility"	S. Ottaviano/T. Ottaviano	3:47
4.	"Melt My Heart"	S. Ottaviano/T. Ottaviano	2:43
5.	"With A Little Love"	Theodore Ottaviano	3:50

Side two
No.	Title	Writer(s)	Length
6.	"Witchcraft"	Theodore Ottaviano	3:41
7.	"You Look Through Me"	S. Ottaviano/T. Ottaviano	3:53
8.	"Champagne Wishes"	S. Ottaviano/T. Ottaviano	3:03
9.	"Oranges And Lemons"	S. Ottaviano/T. Ottaviano	3:32
10.	"Lullaby"	Theodore Ottaviano	6:03

Bonus tracks on 2009 CD reissue
No.	Title	Writer(s)	Length
11.	"Pretty Boys And Pretty Girls (Extended Mix)"	Theodore Ottaviano	7:23
12.	"Tubular Bells/Pretty Boys And Pretty Girls (Regan's House Medley)"	Mike Oldfield/T. Ottaviano	14:25
13.	"Lullaby (Pleasant Dream Mix)"	Theodore Ottaviano	6:59
14.	"Witchcraft (Extended Mix)"	Theodore Ottaviano	5:18
15.	"Enchantra"	T. Ottaviano/J. Lee	2:45

== Personnel ==
- Jade Lee – Keyboards, percussion, vocals
- Susan Ottaviano – Vocals
- Ted Ottaviano – Keyboards, programming, vocals (lead vocals on "With A Little Love")
- Lauren Roselli – Keyboards, vocals

Additional personnel:

- Produced by Flood & Ted Ottaviano
- Mixed by Alan Meyerson
- "Melt My Heart" & "Champagne Wishes" mixed by Flood
- Mastered by Jack Skinner at Sterling Sound
- Engineers: Mike Rogers, MacDonald Quayle, Jeff Lord-Alge
- Assistant Engineers: Kieran Walsh, Bill Mansfield, Moses Schneider, Claudio Ordenes
- Recorded at D+D Recording and Unique Recording, NYC, and the Cathedral of St. John the Divine, NYC
- Mixed at Hansa Tonstudios, Berlin and Ground Control, Los Angeles
- Bagpipes on "Lullaby" by Roger Parsons
- Strings on "Lullaby" conducted by Michelle DiBucci
- Art Direction and Design: Nick Egan assisted by Tracy Veal
- Cover Photograph: "Cupid Considering" by Julia Margaret Cameron, 1872. International Museum of Photography at George Eastman House
- Book Of Love photographed by David LaChappelle
- Clothing by Jeffrey Costello

Reissue credits:

- Reissue Executive Producer: Gordon Anderson
- Liner Notes: Michael Paoletta
- Mastered by: Bob Fisher
- Thanks to: Mark Pinkus and Dave Kapp
- Management: Michael Pagnotta for Reach Media

== Chart positions ==
=== Album ===
Year	Chart	Peak position	Total weeks
1988	U.S. Billboard 200	156	10

=== Singles ===
Year	Song	Chart peak positions	
Year	Song	US Club Play	Hot 100
1988	"Pretty Boys And Pretty Girls"	5	90
1988	"Lullaby"	27	—
1989	"Witchcraft"	—	—

"—" denotes a release that did not chart.
