= You Make Me Feel So Good =

Single by Book of Love

from the album Book of Love
- Released: 30 July 1986
- Studio: Unique Recording, New York City
- Genre: Synth-pop, new wave
- Length: 3:58 (album version)
- Label: Sire Records
- Songwriters: Susan Ottaviano; Theodore Ottaviano
- Producer: Ivan Ivan

Book of Love singles chronology
"I Touch Roses" (1985)	"You Make Me Feel So Good" (1986)	"Modigliani (Lost in Your Eyes)" (1987)

Music video
- "You Make Me Feel So Good" on YouTube

"You Make Me Feel So Good" is the third single released by the American synth-pop band Book of Love. The song was included on the band's eponymous debut album Book of Love in 1986. The song was written by band members Susan Ottaviano and Ted Ottaviano.

Although "You Make Me Feel So Good" failed to reach the Billboard Hot 100 chart, it became Book of Love's first CHR radio hit. The song was remixed for the single by Jellybean and Ivan Ivan. For the 12" single, album track "Lost Souls" was remixed and extended by Mark Kamins. Also appearing on the 12" single is the 'Full Bloom Version' of "I Touch Roses" which was remixed by Depeche Mode producer and Mute Records founder, Daniel Miller.

A video was filmed for "You Make Me Feel So Good" and released to promote the album.

== Track listings ==
=== 1986 7" single (Sire Records 7-28685) ===
Side A. "You Make Me Feel So Good" - 3:58
Side B. "Lost Souls" - 4:28

=== 1986 7" promo single (Sire Records 7-28685-A) ===
Side A. "You Make Me Feel So Good" (Remix) - 3:58
Side B. "You Make Me Feel So Good" (Remix) - 3:58

=== 1986 12" maxi-single (Sire Records 0-20474) ===
Side A1. "You Make Me Feel So Good" (Flutter Mix) - 6:01
Side A2. "Lost Souls" (Spirited Mix) - 6:46
Side B1. "I Touch Roses" (Full Bloom Version) - 5:35
Side B2. "You Make Me Feel So Good" (Dub Mix) - 3:58

== Personnel ==
Written by Susan Ottaviano and Theodore Ottaviano. All instruments arranged, programmed, and performed by Book of Love.

- Susan Ottaviano - Lead vocals
- Jade Lee - Percussion
- Lauren Roselli - Keyboards
- Ted Ottaviano - Keyboards, melodica

Credits

- Produced by Ivan Ivan
- "You Make Me Feel So Good" (Flutter Mix)
  Remixed by Jellybean and Ivan Ivan
  Remix Engineer: "Doc" Dougherty
  Assistant Engineer: Mark Roule
  Remixed at Sigma Sound Studios, NYC
- "Lost Souls" (Spirited Mix) Remixed by Mark Kamins
- "I Touch Roses" (Full Bloom Version) Remixed by Daniel Miller
- "You Make Me Feel So Good" (Dub Mix) Remixed by Jellybean and Ivan Ivan

== Official versions ==
Year	Version	Length	Mixed/Remixed by	Comment
1986	Album version	3:58	Ivan Ivan	Found on all formats of the album Book of Love.*
1986	7" Single Remix	3:58	Jellybean and Ivan Ivan	Found only on 7" promo single, and the best of compilation CD I Touch Roses: The Best of Book of Love.*
1986	Flutter Mix	6:01	Jellybean and Ivan Ivan	Found only on the 12" vinyl single and the 1988 CD versions of the album Book of Love.*
1986	Dub Mix	3:58	Jellybean and Ivan Ivan	A semi-instrumental version of the song. Found only on the 12" vinyl single.
2009	Demo	2:57	Ted Ottaviano	The original demo version. Found only on the 2009 CD reissue bonus disc of Book of Love (Noble Rot).

" * " - denotes version is available as digital download.
