= Boy (Book of Love song) =

1985 single by Book of Love

Single by Book of Love

from the album Book of Love
- B-side: "Book of Love"
- Released: 1985
- Recorded: Early 1985, Unique Recording, NYC
- Genre: Synthpop, new wave
- Length: 2:57 (album version)
- Label: Sire Records
- Songwriter: Theodore Ottaviano
- Producer: Ivan Ivan

Book of Love singles chronology
"Boy" (1985)	"I Touch Roses" (1985)

Music video
- "Boy" on YouTube

"Boy" is the 1985 debut single by the American synth-pop band Book of Love. The song was included on the band's eponymous debut album Book of Love in 1986.

== Background ==
"Boy" was written by band member Theodore ("Ted") Ottaviano and features a prominent Chimes melody. The band secured a recording contract when the demo of the song was given to DJ/producer Ivan Ivan, who then passed it along to Seymour Stein of Sire Records.

The song is said to describe the frustrations of a woman with an affection for "a boy who likes boys", with songwriter Ted Ottaviano adding in a 2016 Village Voice interview that the song was "written about Boy Bar, which was a very exclusive gay club in the East Village."

In 1985, a rare Australian promotional video was shot for the single. On May 21, 1985, the song was featured on American Bandstand's rate-a-record segment. Up against B.E. Taylor Group's "Reggae Rock & Roll", "Boy" won the competition with a score of 84.

== Chart performance ==
Although the song failed to reach the Billboard Hot 100 chart, it did make the top 10 on the Billboard Hot Dance Club Play chart, where it peaked at No. 7 in April 1985.

== 2000 remixes ==
"Boy (Remixes)"

Single by Book of Love

from the album I Touch Roses: The Best of Book of Love
- Released: 30 January 2001; Late 2000 (Promo)
- Recorded: Early 1985, Unique Recording, NYC; 2000 (remixes)
- Genre: Synthpop, new wave
- Length: 3:11 (Peter Rauhofer Remix, album edit, a.k.a. Big Red Mix); 9:59 (Peter Rauhofer Club Mix)
- Label: Sire Records
- Songwriter: Theodore Ottaviano
- Producers: Ivan Ivan; Peter Rauhofer; Headrillaz; Dubaholics; RPO; Ted Ottaviano & Bill Coleman

Book of Love singles chronology
"Hunny Hunny" / "Chatterbox (Pt. 2)" (1993)	"Boy (Remixes)" (2001)	"I Touch Roses (Markus Schulz Remixes)" (2001)

Music video
- "Boy" (Big Red Mix) on YouTube

In 2000, the song was remixed by noted club DJ Peter Rauhofer, as well as Headrillaz, Dubaholics, RPO, and re-released to dance clubs in late 2000/early 2001. These remixes, including an almost ten-minute-long version by Rauhofer, again charted on the Billboard Club Play chart under the title "Boy (Remixes)", this time reaching No. 1 on the dance chart in February 2001. Both the original version of "Boy" as well as an edit of the remix by Rauhofer were included on Book of Love's greatest hits album, I Touch Roses: The Best of Book of Love, in 2001.

In 2001, a promotional video remix titled 'Big Red Mix' was made for the album edit of the Peter Rauhofer remix using footage from the band's 1989 appearance at Bill Graham's In Concert Against AIDS benefit show in San Francisco.

In 2015, Daniel T remixed his song in his Album, Tetrachromat.

== Track listings ==
1985 7" single (Sire)

Side A

"Boy" - 3:02

Side B

"Book of Love" - 4:31

1985 12" maxi-single (Sire)

Side A

1. "Boy" (Extended Mix) - 4:28
2. "Boy" (Dub) - 5:00

Side B

1. "Boy" - 3:02
2. "Book of Love" - 4:31

2000 2 x 12" promo (Reprise)

Side A

1. "Boy" (Peter Rauhofer Club Mix) - 9:59

Side B

1. "Boy" (Headrillaz Extended Vocal Mix) - 7:10
2. "Boy" (Headrillaz Dub) - 3:30

Side C

1. "Boy" (Peter Rauhofer Dub) - 8:18

Side D

1. "Boy" (Headrillaz Club Dub) - 4:47
2. "Boy" (A Cappella) - 3:24

2001 12" promo (Reprise)

Side A

1. "Boy" (Dubaholics Remix) - 6:11
2. "Boy" (Dubaholics Dub) - 5:13

Side B

1. "Boy" (RPO Remix) - 6:40
2. "Boy" (Sound Bisquit "Blame" Dub) - 8:00

2001 2 x 12" single (Reprise)

Side A

1. "Boy" (Peter Rauhofer Club Mix) - 9:59

Side B

1. "Boy" (Headrillaz Extended Vocal Mix) - 7:10
2. "Boy" (Headrillaz Dub) - 3:30

Side C

1. "Boy" (Dubaholics Remix) - 6:11
2. "Boy" (Dubaholics Remix) - 5:13

Side D

1. "Boy" (Peter Rauhofer Dub) - 8:18
2. "Boy" (RPO Remix) - 6:40

2001 CD single (Reprise)

1. "Boy" (Peter Rauhofer Club Mix) - 9:59
2. "Boy" (Peter Rauhofer Dub) - 8:18
3. "Boy" (Headrillaz Extended Vocal Mix)" - 7:09
4. "Boy" (Headrillaz Dub) - 5:32
5. "Boy" (RPO Remix) - 6:40
6. "Boy" (Dubaholics Remix) - 6:11
7. "Boy" (Dubaholics Dub) - 5:13
8. "Boy" (Original 12" Version) - 4:27
9. "Boy" (Sound Bisquit "Blame" Dub) -8:00

2026 Dave Aude Remix Single

1. "Boy" (Dave Aude Remix) - 3:07
2. "Boy" (Dave Aude Remix Edit) - 2:21
3. "Boy" (Dave Aude Extended Remix) - 3:50

== Charts ==
Year	Song	Chart peak positions
Year	Song	US Club Play
1985	"Boy"	7
2001	"Boy" (Remix)	2
2001	"Boy"	1

== In popular culture ==
The song is played during a club scene in the episode "Limbo" of the American television series Halt and Catch Fire, during a bar scene in the film Fun Mom Dinner, and twice in 2025 film Companion. The song also appears during the closing credits of the fifth episode of the third season of the TV show Industry.

== Personnel ==
Written by Theodore Ottaviano.

- Jade Lee - drums
- Ted Ottaviano - keyboards, bells
- Lauren Roselli - keyboards
- Susan Ottaviano - lead vocals

1985 version credits

- Engineered by Steve Peck
- Recorded and mixed at Unique Recording, NYC
- Mastered with Herb Powers at Frankford Wayne, NYC
- Produced by Ivan Ivan
- Cover concept by Book of Love and Zoë Brotman
- Art direction by Zoë Brotman/Studio Zed

2001 remixes credits

- Remix A&R coordination tracks 3–9 (CD): Bill Coleman for Peace Bisquit, NYC.
- Remix and additional production on Peter Rauhofer Remix (Big Red Mix), Peter Rauhofer Club Mix, Peter Rauhofer Dub, A Capella, by Peter Rauhofer for Unique Productions, NYC.
- Remix and additional production on Headrillaz Extended Vocal Mix, Headrillaz Dub, Headrillaz Club Dub, by Headrillaz (Caspar Kedros and Darius Kedros) at The Bunker. Edits by Albert Cabrera for One Rascal.
- Postproduction and remix on RPO Remix by Rick Pier O'Neil at RPO Traxx, France.
- Remixing on Dubaholics Remix and Dubaholics Dub by The Dubaholics for Dubaholics Productions at the Asylum Studios, UK. Rhodes: Antony Gorry. Bass licks: Mall.
- Production and remix on Sound Bisquit "Blame" Dub by Ted Ottaviano and Bill Coleman for Peace Bisquit and Sound Umbrella. Mixed by Doug McKean at World of Beauty, NYC.
- Cover art by Bill Jacobson, copyright 1993, Interim portrait #525, courtesy of Julie Saul Gallery, NYC.
- Art direction and design by Ethan Trask.

== Official versions ==
Year	Version	Length	Mixed/Remixed by	Comment
1985	Album version/ 7" version	2:57	Ivan Ivan	The album version and 7" version are the same. Found on the 7" and 12" vinyl singles, all formats of the album Book of Love and the CD of I Touch Roses: The Best of Book of Love CD.*
1985	Japanese 7" version	3:17	Ivan Ivan	The Japanese 7" version is slightly longer and has a cold ending instead of a fade. Found only on the Japanese 7" vinyl single.
1985	Extended Mix	4:28	Ivan Ivan	Found on the 12" vinyl single and the 1988/1990 Sire Records' CD version of Book of Love.*
1985	Dub	5:00	Ivan Ivan	Found on the 12" vinyl single and the 2009 CD reissue of Book of Love (Noble Rot).
1999	Razormaid Mix	5:23	John Bice	Found on the 1999 Razormaid Records CD compilation Members Revenge 1: Discontented!.
2000	Headrillaz Club Dub	4:47	Casper Kedros; Darius Kedros	Exclusive mix found only on the 2x12" vinyl promo released in 2000.
2000	A Cappella	3:24	Peter Rauhofer	Exclusive a cappella version, taken from the Peter Rauhofer remix (not the original 1985 version). Only found on the 2x12" vinyl promo released in 2000.
2001	Peter Rauhofer Remix	3:11	Peter Rauhofer	A shorter edited version of the Peter Rauhofer Club Mix (Edited by John Masciana) used in the video remix (Big Red Mix). Found on the CD version of I Touch Roses: The Best of Book of Love.*
2001	Peter Rauhofer Club Mix	9:59	Peter Rauhofer	Found on both the regular and promo 2x12" vinyl singles and the Reprise Records CD Maxi-single (2001).
2001	Peter Rauhofer Dub	8:18	Peter Rauhofer	Found on both the regular and promo 2x12" vinyl singles and the Reprise Records CD Maxi-single (2001).
2001	Headrillaz Extended Vocal Mix	7:09	Casper Kedros; Darius Kedros	Found on both the regular and promo 2x12" vinyl singles and the Reprise Records CD Maxi-single (2001).
2001	Headrillaz Dub	5:32	Casper Kedros; Darius Kedros	Found on both the regular and promo 2x12" vinyl singles and the Reprise Records CD Maxi-single (2001).
2001	RPO Remix	6:40	Rick Pier O'Neil	Found on the 2001 promo 12" vinyl, the regular 2x12" vinyl single, and the Reprise Records CD Maxi-single (2001).
2001	Dubaholics Remix	6:11	The Dubaholics	Found on the 2001 promo 12" vinyl, the regular 2x12" vinyl single, and the Reprise Records CD Maxi-single (2001).
2001	Dubaholics Dub	5:13	The Dubaholics	Found on the 2001 promo 12" vinyl, the regular 2x12" vinyl single, and the Reprise Records CD Maxi-single (2001).
2001	Sound Bisquit "Blame" Dub	8:00	Ted Ottaviano; Bill Coleman	Found on the 2001 promo 12" vinyl single and the Reprise Records CD Maxi-single (2001).
2006	DJ Irene Rockstar Mix	4:27	DJ Irene	Found on the 2006 CD compilation Future Retro (Rhino Records).*
2009	Demo	3:06	Theodore Ottaviano	The original demo version. Found only on the bonus disc of the 2009 CD reissue of Book of Love (Noble Rot).
2009	Live	2:43	n/a	Live version from the In Concert Against AIDS benefit, 1989. Found only on the bonus disc of the 2009 CD reissue of Book of Love (Noble Rot).

" * " denotes that version is available as digital download.

== See also ==
- List of number-one dance hits (United States)
