= Lullaby (Book of Love song) =

Single by Book of Love

from the album Lullaby
- B-side: "Oranges and Lemons"
- Released: 4 January 1989
- Recorded: 1987–1988
- Genre: Synthpop, new wave
- Length: 6:15 (album version); 4:05 (single version)
- Label: Sire Records
- Songwriter(s): Theodore Ottaviano
- Producer(s): Flood and Ted Ottaviano

Book of Love singles chronology
"Pretty Boys and Pretty Girls" (1988)	"Lullaby" (1989)	"Witchcraft" (1989)

Music video
- "Lullaby" on YouTube

"Lullaby" is the sixth single released by the American synthpop band Book of Love. The song was the second single released from the band's second album Lullaby in 1988.

Although "Lullaby" failed to reach the Billboard Hot 100 chart, it became a top 30 dance club hit. The song peaked at no. 27 on the Billboard Hot Dance Club Play chart and spent seven weeks on the chart. The track, over time, has become a signature song in the band's catalogue.

The band utilized a string section of 20 Juilliard students, conducted by Michelle DiBucci, to record strings for the track, as well as bagpipes, played by a kilt wearing Roger Parsons. For the 12" single, the track was remixed into five different remixes by Justin Strauss. The band, along with recording engineer "Doc" Dougherty, also remixed the track; titled "Lullaby (7” Version)", this remix was included on the 7-inch and cassette singles sold at retail outlets as well as the promotional CD single.

The cover art of the 12" vinyl and cassette are drawings done by lead vocalist Susan Ottaviano. The drawings are in a similar style to Amedeo Modigliani, the subject of one of their previous singles, titled "Modigliani (Lost in Your Eyes)".

While on tour in mid-2017, the band premiered a music video for the track which was later published to their official YouTube channel. The video, an animated short directed by Ronaldo Aguiar, features all new drawings by Susan Ottaviano.

== Track listings ==
=== 1988 7" Single (Sire Records 7-27667) ===
Side A: "Lullaby" (7" Version) - 4:05

Side B: "Oranges and Lemons" (LP Version) - 3:32

=== 1988 7" Promo Single (Sire Records 7-27667-DJ) ===
Side A: "Lullaby" (7" Remix) - 4:15

Side B: "Lullaby" (7" Remix) - 4:15

=== 1988 12" Maxi-Single (Sire Records 9 21101-0) ===
Side A:

1. "Lullaby" (Pleasant Dream Mix) - 6:56
2. "Lullaby" (Dream Dub) - 6:59
3. "Lullaby" (7" Remix) - 4:15

Side B:

1. "Lullaby" (Insomnia Mix) - 6:47
2. "Lullaby" (Dub Somnia) - 5:41
3. "Oranges and Lemons" - 3:32

=== 1988 Cassette Single (Sire Records 9 27667-4) ===
Side A:

1. "Lullaby" (7" Version) - 4:05

Side B:

1. "Oranges and Lemons" - 3:32

=== 1988 Promo CD Single (Sire Records PRO-CD-3355) ===
1. "Lullaby" (7" Version) - 4:05
2. "Lullaby" (7" Remix) - 4:15
3. "Lullaby" (Pleasant Dream Mix) - 6:56
4. "Lullaby" (Insomnia Mix) - 6:47

== Personnel ==
"Lullaby" written by Theodore Ottaviano. "Oranges and Lemons" written by Susan Ottaviano and Ted Ottaviano. All instruments arranged, programmed, and performed by Book of Love.

- Susan Ottaviano – lead vocals
- Ted Ottaviano – keyboards
- Lauren Roselli – keyboards, backing vocals
- Jade Lee – keyboards, percussion, backing vocals

Credits

- Produced by Flood and Ted Ottaviano
- Additional Production and Remix by Justin Strauss for JustRite Productions
- Remix Engineer: Daniel Abraham
- Additional Keyboard Programming: Eric Kupper
- Edited by Chep Nuñez
- Bagpipes by Roger Parsons
- Strings conducted by Michelle DiBucci
- Drawings by Susan Ottaviano

== Charts ==
Year	Song	Chart peak positions
Year	Song	US Club Play
1988	"Lullaby"	27

== Official versions ==
Year	Version	Length	Mixed/Remixed by	Comment
1988	Album version	6:15	Alan Meyerson	Found on all formats of the album Lullaby.* CD booklet lists track time of 6:03, but it is actually 6:15 with fade.
1989	7" Version	4:05	"Doc" Dougherty; Book of Love	Found on the 7" vinyl single (Sire Records 7-27667), cassette single (Sire Records 9 27667-4) and promo CD single (Sire Records PRO-CD-3355).
1989	7" Remix	4:15	Justin Strauss	Found on the 7" vinyl promo single and the promo CD single (Sire Records PRO-CD-3355).
1989	Pleasant Dream Mix	6:56	Justin Strauss	Found on the 12" vinyl maxi-singles, the promo CD single, and the 2009 reissue CD of Lullaby (Noble Rot).
1989	Dream Dub	6:59	Justin Strauss	Found on the 12" vinyl maxi-single (Sire Records 9 21101-0), and the promo 12" vinyl maxi-single (Sire Records 0-21101).
1989	Insomnia Mix	6:47	Justin Strauss	Found on the 12" vinyl maxi-singles and the promo CD single (Sire Records PRO-CD-3355).
1989	Dub Somnia	5:41	Justin Strauss	Found on the 12" vinyl maxi-single (Sire Records 9 21101-0), and the promo 12" vinyl maxi-single (Sire Records 0-21101).
2001	Edit	4:59	Alan Meyerson	An edit of the album version that has a shorter bagpipe intro and string outro. Found only the CD of I Touch Roses: The Best of Book of Love.*

" * " denotes that version is available as digital download
