= Book of Love (album) =

Studio album by Book of Love
- Released: 1 April 1986
- Recorded: Unique Recording, New York City; Sigma Sound, New York City
- Genre: New wave, synth-pop
- Length: 45:11 (LP and Cassette); 73:17 (CD); 45:36 (2009 reissue); 40:10 (2009 reissue Bonus Disc)
- Label: Sire
- Producer: Ivan Ivan

Book of Love chronology
Book of Love (1986)	Lullaby (1988)

Singles from Book of Love
- 1. "Boy" Released: 1985; 2. "I Touch Roses" Released: 25 September 1985; 3. "You Make Me Feel So Good" Released: 30 July 1986; 4. "Modigliani (Lost In Your Eyes)" Released: April 1987

Professional ratings
Review scores
Source	Rating
AllMusic	4/5 stars
Pitchfork	8.4/10
PopMatters	7/10 stars

Book of Love is the debut studio album by American synth-pop and electronic band Book of Love, released on April 1, 1986, by Sire Records.

== History ==
Philadelphia-based synthpop quartet Book of Love released their debut, Book of Love, in the spring of 1986, when synthpop was at its peak in the mid-1980s. During 1984 and 1985, the band recorded various demos at the recording studio Noise, in midtown Manhattan. One of the demos was the song "Boy", a toe-tapping tale of teen-girl angst featuring tubular bells and a skip-along beat. Noise recording studio had many bells and chimes available at the band's disposal. Reflecting on that time, Ted Ottaviano stated, "I was fascinated with Altered Images and other bands that were incorporating bells and chimes into their music. Long brass chimes, tubular bells, whatever. It sounded right, for the time." Keyboardist Lauren Roselli gave a copy of the "Boy" demo to disc jockey Ivan Ivan, who had recently co-produced the dancefloor hit "The Dominatrix Sleeps Tonight" by Dominatrix. Ivan forwarded the demo to Sire Records president Seymour Stein, who subsequently signed the group to his label in August 1984.

In 1985, the band began recording what would become their debut album at Unique Recording with Ivan Ivan as producer. The band recorded two tracks for the single, "Boy" and the band's theme song "Book of Love". "Boy" was released as a single, and became a huge dance club hit, peaking at no. 7 on the Billboard Hot Dance Club Play chart. A rare Australian promotional video was shot for the song, featuring the band performing the song with Ted Ottaviano playing tubular bells.

After having a hit with "Boy", the band quit their day jobs. While doing promotion for the single, the band met Depeche Mode at a party hosted by Rockpool (modern rock promotion company). Subsequently, the band was offered the opening slot on the North American leg of Depeche Mode's Some Great Reward Tour. Starting in Washington, D.C., on March 14, 1985, the band, still without an album, joined the tour with Depeche Mode, playing coast to coast throughout their fifteen North American tour dates.

Upon returning from the Depeche Mode tour, the band went straight into the recording studio to record "Happy Day" for inclusion on the UK single of "Boy". The remainder of the summer was spent on a small club tour of the southern states that the Depeche Mode tour had skipped over, and recording the songs "I Touch Roses" and "Lost Souls" for the next single. A second single, "I Touch Roses", was then released in September 1985. Daniel Miller, founder of Mute Records and producer of Depeche Mode, remixed the song as a single remix and an extended 'Full Bloom Version' for the European single that was released in early 1986. "I Touch Roses" became a big club hit, peaking at no. 8 on the Billboard Hot Dance Club Play chart. Because of the success of "I Touch Roses", the band got a green light to finish the album. "We were the little choo-choo train. We didn't know it at the time, but thankfully with "I Touch Roses", it was not preordained that Sire was developing us at the time. There was no grand scheme. It was more a la carte. But then people started picking up on 'Roses' and then the album happened," recalled Ted Ottaviano in 2009.

Up until the end of the summer of 1985, the band had only recorded five songs. ("Boy", "Book of Love", "Happy Day", "I Touch Roses", and "Lost Souls") Following the success of I Touch Roses", the band resumed work on the album in September 1985 at Unique Recording and Sigma Sound Studios in New York City, recording the seven new songs that would make up the rest of their debut album. Instruments the band used to record the album were various synthesizers (Oberheim Xpander, Yamaha DX-7, Casio CZ-1000, Roland Juno 6, Roland JX-8P), an E-mu Emulator sampler, piano, tubular bells, chimes, melodica, and both acoustic and electronic percussion (Yamaha RX-11 drum machine, Simmons Toms). The main songwriting duties on Book of Love fell to Ted Ottaviano, with Susan Ottaviano co-writing six of the tracks, and Jade Lee contributing to two. One of the songs recorded was a cover song of "Die Matrosen" ("The Sailor", in English), originally by the all-girl Swiss post-punk band LiLiPUT, which features a catchy chorus of whistling. Recording of the album was finally finished in January 1986.

The eponymous debut album Book of Love was finally released on April 1, 1986. The album cover consists of four black and white photos of the band members, shot by Michael Halsband, along with an overlapping band name/album title in calligraphy by Herbert Lee, a relation to Jade Lee. The inside of the cassette sleeve and back of the LP feature "wacky lettering" done by artist Stephen Tashjian, and also a vase with flowers graphic that was used on the tour merchandise. The release also started the tradition of the band using Roman numerals to indicate the year of release, MCMLXXXVI (1986).

"You Make Me Feel So Good" was released as the first official single from the record on July 31, 1986, and became Book of Love's first CHR radio hit. The song was remixed for the single by Jellybean and Ivan Ivan. Album track "Lost Souls", was also remixed and extended by Mark Kamins and included on the 12 inch single. In April 1986, a music video was filmed on location in New York City for "You Make Me Feel So Good" and released in late July along with the single to promote the album.

In 1986, Depeche Mode once again asked the band to be their opening act. Finally with an album to promote, Book of Love toured as the opening act on the massive Depeche Mode Black Celebration Tour, joining the band's first European leg on April 29, 1986 in Hanover, West Germany, and playing 48 shows in twelve weeks throughout the full North American leg which ended on July 15, 1986, in Irvine, California. Once the Depeche Mode tour was through, the band set out on their own headlining tour of clubs, beginning in Boston on August 8, 1986 and ending in Albion, Michigan in March 1987.

A second official and final single taken from the album, "Modigliani (Lost in Your Eyes)", was released in April, 1987. The song was a dance club hit, peaking at no. 17 on the Billboard Hot Dance Club Play chart, becoming as popular as New Order and Depeche Mode singles in clubs at its peak. "Modigliani (Lost in Your Eyes)" is an ode to Italian painter Amedeo Modigliani. The track was penned by Jade Lee, Susan and Ted Ottaviano (no relation), who had all been art school students and were inspired by the Italian painter's paintings and history. In a 2008 interview, Ted Ottaviano explained, "Amedeo Modigliani had always been the band’s own version of a rock star. After all, we were all art school students. At the time I was working on the [Requiem Mass] remix I became submerged and almost obsessed in his life story. It read like a Bronte sisters novel. I wrote a short biography for the front cover of the 12 inch." The cover of the single featured one of Modigliani's famous paintings of his mistress Jeanne Hebuterne, along with the short biography of the painter written by Ted Ottaviano. For the back sleeve of the 12 inch single, Susan Ottaviano made drawings of each member of the band in the style of Modigliani. Similar, yet alternate large portrait drawings of the band were later used as large stage props behind the band on their Lullaby Tour in 1989.

The four-minute 'Requiem Mass' remixed version of "Modigliani (Lost in Your Eyes)" was featured in an episode of Miami Vice on November 6, 1987, and both the original single and 'Requiem Mass' remix were used in the 1987 film Planes, Trains and Automobiles.

In November 1988, the album Book of Love was finally made available on CD for the first time. The new CD edition included five bonus remixes.

In 2000, the song "Boy" was remixed by Peter Rauhofer and officially released in 2001, charting at no. 1 on the Billboard Hot Dance Club Play chart. Exposing a new generation to Book of Love, the single contained many new remixes by Dubaholics, Headrillaz, and RPO. In 2001, "I Touch Roses" was also given a new remix treatment by Markus Schulz for a promo 12 inch.

Reflecting on the album, keyboardist Ted Ottaviano explained, "I've always believed people's aesthetics are based more on what they don't know than what they do know,...We had great instincts, and wanted to say what we did as swiftly and simply as we could."

In 2009, Book of Love was remastered and reissued by Collector's Choice/Noble Rot Records as a deluxe double CD edition. The reissue's bonus disc features 11 tracks (all appearing on CD for the first time) including: five demos, two live tracks, one instrumental, two rare remixes, and Book of Love's version of "We Three Kings" from Sire Records' 1987 promo Christmas compilation Yulesville.

== Release and reception ==
Book of Love was released on LP and cassette on April 1, 1986, with twelve tracks, featuring a mixture of memorable melodies and intriguing lyrics. Upon release, Book of Love did not chart, receiving little attention among the large number of new wave and synthpop albums at the time. Four of the album's tracks were released as singles, which charted successfully on the Billboard Hot Dance Club Play and Hot Dance Singles Sales charts in the US.

AllMusic gave the album an editor rating of 4 out of 5 stars, with William Ruhlmann claiming, "...dance pop with an edge. The music is sweeter and lighter than much of this genre, and vocalist Susan Ottaviano has a matter-of-fact phrasing style that keeps it all from getting too sweet." The reissue also received a 4 out of 5 rating, with William Ruhlmann stating, "On this debut album, songs like "You Make Me Feel So Good" have an effervescent early-'60s girl group bounce, while others suggest what the early Velvet Underground with Nico might have sounded like with synthesizers."

PopMatters gave the album reissue a 7 out of 10 rating, with Associate Music Editor Christel Owens referring to the original album as "near perfection".

== Track listing ==
Side one
No.	Title	Writer(s)	Length
1.	"Modigliani (Lost in Your Eyes)"	J. Lee/S. Ottaviano/T. Ottaviano	4:01
2.	"You Make Me Feel So Good"	S. Ottaviano/T. Ottaviano	4:02
3.	"Still Angry"	S. Ottaviano/T. Ottaviano	3:23
4.	"White Lies"	S. Ottaviano/T. Ottaviano	3:53
5.	"Lost Souls"	Theodore Ottaviano	4:52
6.	"Late Show"	J. Lee/T. Ottaviano	3:38

Side two
No.	Title	Writer(s)	Length
7.	"I Touch Roses"	Theodore Ottaviano	3:26
8.	"Yellow Sky"	S. Ottaviano/T. Ottaviano	4:44
9.	"Boy"	Theodore Ottaviano	2:59
10.	"Happy Day"	S. Ottaviano/T. Ottaviano	2:32
11.	"Die Matrosen"	Klaudia Schiff/Marlene Marder	3:06
12.	"Book of Love"	Theodore Ottaviano	4:35

Bonus tracks on 1988 CD release
No.	Title	Writer(s)	Length
13.	"Modigliani (Lost in Your Eyes) [I Dream of Jeanne Mix]"	J. Lee/S. Ottaviano/T. Ottaviano	7:45
14.	"Modigliani (Requiem Mass)"	J. Lee/S. Ottaviano/T. Ottaviano	4:02
15.	"You Make Me Feel So Good (Flutter Mix)"	S. Ottaviano/T. Ottaviano	6:05
16.	"I Touch Roses (Long Stemmed Version)"	Theodore Ottaviano	5:46
17.	"Boy (Extended Mix)"	Theodore Ottaviano	4:28

2009 Reissue (Bonus Disc)
No.	Title	Writer(s)	Length
1.	"Happy Day (Live)"	S. Ottaviano/T. Ottaviano	3:00
2.	"You Make Me Feel So Good (Demo)"	T. Ottaviano, S. Ottaviano	2:57
3.	"Lost Souls (Demo)"	Theodore Ottaviano	4:09
4.	"Boy (Demo)"	Theodore Ottaviano	3:06
5.	"I Touch Roses (Full Bloom Version)"	Theodore Ottaviano	5:38
6.	"Modigliani (Instrumental)"	J. Lee/S. Ottaviano/T. Ottaviano	4:03
7.	"White Lies (Demo)"	S. Ottaviano/T. Ottaviano	3:12
8.	"I Touch Roses (Demo)"	Theodore Ottaviano	3:05
9.	"We Three Kings"	J. Henry Hopkins Jr./Book of Love	3:19
10.	"Boy (Dub)"	Theodore Ottaviano	5:04
11.	"Boy (Live)"	Theodore Ottaviano	2:43

== Personnel ==
- Susan Ottaviano – Vocals
- Jade Lee – Keyboards, acoustic and electronic percussion, background vocals
- Lauren Roselli – Keyboards, backing vocals
- Ted Ottaviano – Keyboards, piano, tubular bells, melodica, background vocals

Additional personnel:

- Produced by Ivan Ivan
- Recorded at Unique Recording and Sigma Sound Studios, NYC
- Engineered by Steve Peck
- Assistant Engineers: Greg La Porta (Unique), Mark Roule (Sigma)
- "Modigliani (Lost In Your Eyes)" mixed by Bob Rosa
- "You Make Me Feel So Good", "White Lies", and "Yellow Sky" mixed by Jim Dougherty
- "Lost Souls" mixed by Mark Kamins
- "Happy Day" mixed by Frank Heller
- Mastered by Ted Jensen at Sterling Sound, NYC
- Art direction and design: Nick Egan
- Photography: Michael Halsband
- Calligraphy by Herbert Lee
- Clothing by Jeffrey Costello
- Hair and makeup: Ellen Kinnally
- Wacky lettering by Stephen Tashjian

Bonus tracks on 1988 CD

- "Modigliani (Lost in Your Eyes)" (I Dream of Jeanne Mix) & "Modigliani (Lost in Your Eyes)" (Requiem Mass): Remix and additional production by Ted Ottaviano
- "You Make Me Feel So Good" (Flutter Mix): Remixed by Jellybean and Ivan Ivan

Reissue credits:

- Reissue Executive Producer: Gordon Anderson
- Liner notes: Michael Paoletta
- Mastered by: Bob Fisher
- Thanks to: Mark Pinkus and Dave Kapp
- Management: Michael Pagnotta for Reach Media

== Chart positions ==
=== Singles ===
Year	Song	Chart peak positions	
Year	Song	US Club Play	US Dance Sales
1985	"Boy"	7	24
1985	"I Touch Roses"	8	26
1986	"You Make Me Feel So Good"	—	23
1987	"Modigliani (Lost in Your Eyes)"	17	47

"—" denotes a release that did not chart.
