= I Touch Roses =

1985 single by Book of Love

Single by Book of Love

from the album Book of Love
- B-side: "Lost Souls"
- Released: 25 September 1985
- Recorded: 1985, Unique Recording, NYC
- Length: 3:25 (album version)
- Label: Sire Records
- Songwriter: Theodore Ottaviano
- Producer: Ivan Ivan

Book of Love singles chronology
"Boy" (1985)	"I Touch Roses" (1985)	"You Make Me Feel So Good" (1986)

Alternate cover
- 1986 German 12" vinyl Maxi-Single sleeve

"I Touch Roses (Markus Schulz Remixes)"

Single by Book of Love
- Released: 2001
- Recorded: Early 1985, Unique Recording, NYC; 2001 (remixes)
- Length: 8:45
- Label: Reprise Records
- Songwriter: Theodore Ottaviano
- Producers: Ivan Ivan; Markus Schulz

Book of Love singles chronology
"Boy (Remixes)" (2001)	"I Touch Roses (Markus Schulz Remixes)" (2001)	"All Girl Band" (2016)

"I Touch Roses" is the second single released by the American synth-pop band Book of Love. The song was included on the band's eponymous debut album Book of Love in 1986. The B-side to the single is "Lost Souls", a remixed version of which also appeared on their debut album.

Although "I Touch Roses" failed to reach the Billboard Hot 100 chart, it did make the Top 10 on the Billboard Hot Dance Club Play chart, where it peaked at no. 8 in 1985.

"I Touch Roses" was written by band member Theodore ("Ted") Ottaviano. After the success of their first single, "Boy", "I Touch Roses" followed a similar trajectory, securing that the band would record a full album for Sire Records. In 2009, Ted Ottaviano revealed, "We didn't know it at the time, but thankfully, with 'I Touch Roses', it was not preordained that Sire was developing us at the time. There was no grand scheme. It was more a la carte. But then people started picking up on 'Roses' and then the album happened."

== Remix ==
In 2001, after having success with new remixes of "Boy", the record company commissioned Disc jockey/producer Markus Schulz to attempt a follow-up by remixing "I Touch Roses" for the new millennium. A promotional 12" single was released in 2001, featuring the Markus Schulz Dark Rose Remix, and an instrumental version of the remix on the flipside, in order to further promote Book of Love's greatest hits album, I Touch Roses: The Best of Book of Love. The new remixes did not chart, and are not included on the album.

== Reception ==
John Leland at Spin said, "it's quietly melodic, and all the elements are crisp and subtle. It deflates MTV bombast into a coyly tranquil tune that stretches gracefully without moaning about it. Instantly forgettable, but subtly compelling while it's spinning."

== Track listings ==
=== 1985 7" Single (Sire Records 7-28428) ===
Side A: "I Touch Roses" - 3:23

Side B: "Lost Souls" - 4:11

=== 1985 12" Maxi-Single (Sire Records 0-20381) ===
Side A:

1. "I Touch Roses" (Long Stemmed Version) - 5:43

Side B:

1. "I Touch Roses" - 3:24
2. "Lost Souls" - 4:11

=== 1986 7" Remix Single (Sire Records 928 673-7) ===
Side A: "I Touch Roses" (Remix) - 3:19

Side B: "Lost Souls" (Remix) - 6:46

=== 1986 12" Maxi-Single (Sire Records 920 482-0) ===
Side A:

1. "I Touch Roses" (A Daniel Miller Extended Remix) - 5:35

Side B:

1. "I Touch Roses" (7" Remix) - 3:19
2. "Lost Souls" (Remix) - 6:46

=== 2001 12" Promo (Reprise Records PRO-A-100579) ===
Side A:

1. "I Touch Roses" (Markus Schulz Dark Rose Remix) - 8:45

Side B:

1. "I Touch Roses" (Markus Schulz Dark Rose Instrumental) - 8:45

== Personnel ==
Written by Theodore Ottaviano. All instruments arranged, programmed, and performed by Book of Love.

- Susan Ottaviano - Lead vocals
- Jade Lee - Percussion
- Lauren Roselli - Keyboards
- Ted Ottaviano - Keyboards

1985 version credits

- Engineered by Steve Peck
- Recorded and mixed at Unique Recording, NYC
- Mastered with Herb Powers at Frankford Wayne, NYC
- Produced by Ivan Ivan
- Art Direction: Zoë Brotman/Studio Zed
- Cover Art: Herbert Lee
- Photo: David La Chapelle
- Clothes by: Jeffrey Costello
- Hair and Make-up: Jill Sunshine

2001 remixes credits

- Produced by Ivan Ivan
- Remix and additional production by Markus Schulz.

== Charts ==
Chart (1985)	Peak position
Canadian RPM Top Singles	60
US Billboard Hot Dance Club Play	8

== Official versions ==
Year	"I Touch Roses" Version	Length	Mixed/Remixed by	Comment
1985	Album version/ 7" version	3:23	Ivan Ivan	The album version and 7" version are the same. Found on the 7" and 12" vinyl singles, all formats of the album Book of Love and the CD of I Touch Roses: The Best of Book of Love CD.*
1985	7" Remix	3:19	Daniel Miller	The 7" Remix version is a short edit of the 'Full Bloom Version' by Daniel Miller. Found on the 1986 German 7" and 12" vinyl remix singles .
1985	Long Stemmed Version	5:43	Ivan Ivan	Found on the 12" vinyl single and the 1988 Sire Records CD version of Book of Love.*
1985	Full Bloom Version	5:35	Daniel Miller	Also known as 'A Daniel Miller Extended Remix'. Found on the 1986 German 12" vinyl single, the 12" vinyl single of "You Make Me Feel So Good", and the 2009 CD reissue bonus disc of Book of Love (Noble Rot).
2001	Markus Schulz Dark Rose Remix	8:45	Markus Schulz	Exclusive new promotional remix. Found only on the 12" vinyl promo released in 2001.
2001	Markus Schulz Dark Rose Instrumental	8:45	Markus Schulz	An instrumental version of the Dark Rose Remix. Found only on the 12" vinyl promo released in 2001.
2001	Twelfth's Dark Rose Mix/Edit	4:07	Markus Schulz/Twelfth	An edit of the Markus Schulz Dark Rose Remix by Twelfth.
2009	Demo	3:05	Theodore Ottaviano	The original demo version. Found only on the 2009 CD reissue bonus disc of Book of Love (Noble Rot).

Official versions of B-side "Lost Souls"

Year	"Lost Souls" Version	Length	Mixed/Remixed by	Comment
1985	Album version	4:50	Mark Kamins	The album version is a short version of the 'Spirited Mix' by Mark Kamins, and found on all formats of the album Book of Love, except for the 2009 CD reissue (Noble Rot).*
1985	7" version	4:11	Ivan Ivan	The 7" version is the original version of the song before being remixed by Mark Kamins. Found on the B-side of the "I Touch Roses" 7" and 12" vinyl singles.
1986	Spirited Mix	6:46	Mark Kamins	Found on the 1986 German 7" and 12" singles of "I Touch Roses", and the 12" vinyl single of "You Make Me Feel So Good".
2009	Remastered album version	5:25	Mark Kamins	A longer version than the original issue album version; has an extended outro and a cold ending. Found only on CD1 of the 2009 remastered reissue of Book of Love (Noble Rot).
2009	Demo	4:09	Ted Ottaviano	The original demo version. Found only on the 2009 CD reissue of Book of Love (Noble Rot).

" * " denotes that version is available as digital download
