= Pretty Boys and Pretty Girls =

Single by Book of Love

from the album Lullaby
- B-side: "Tubular Bells"
- Released: May 24, 1988
- Recorded: 1987–1988
- Genre: Synth-pop, new wave
- Length: 4:26 (album version); 4:48 (single version)
- Label: Sire Records
- Songwriter: Theodore Ottaviano
- Producers: Flood and Ted Ottaviano

Book of Love singles chronology
"Modigliani (Lost in Your Eyes)" (1987)	"Pretty Boys and Pretty Girls" (1988)	"Lullaby" (1989)

Music video
- "Tubular Bells/Pretty Boys and Pretty Girls" on YouTube

"Pretty Boys and Pretty Girls" is the fifth single released by the American synth-pop band Book of Love. The song was the first single released prior to the band's second album Lullaby in 1988.

"Pretty Boys and Pretty Girls" became the band's highest-charting single at no. 90 in the Billboard Hot 100, and their only track that crossed over into mainstream pop. In the dance clubs, the song was a smash, and made it to no. 5 on the Hot Dance Club Play chart, spending 11 weeks on the chart.

"Pretty Boys and Pretty Girls" became one of the first songs ever to address the issue of the AIDS epidemic, featuring the lyrics of "strangers in the night exchanging glances, but sex is dangerous, I don't take my chances...safe sex, safe sex."

"We talked about AIDS at a time when people were not talking about it." — Susan Ottaviano

The B-side to the single is a cover of Mike Oldfield's "Tubular Bells", originally became famous as the theme song in popular horror movie The Exorcist. For the track, the band sampled band member Lauren Roselli crying "Mother, make it stop!", channeling Linda Blair's role as Regan from the movie. For the 12" release of the single, "Tubular Bells" and "Pretty Boys and Pretty Girls" were mixed together as a fourteen-minute medley by Scott Blackwell and Bob Brockmann. The album Lullaby also begins with a shorter version of "Tubular Bells", which flows seamlessly into "Pretty Boys and Pretty Girls", the second track on the album.

A promotional video was shot and released for "Pretty Boys and Pretty Girls"; an alternate version of the video was also released using the medley edit of "Tubular Bells/Pretty Boys and Pretty Girls”.

== Track listings ==
=== 1988 7" Single (Sire Records 7-27858) ===
Side A: "Pretty Boys and Pretty Girls" (7" Edit) - 4:30

Side B: "Tubular Bells" (7" Mix) - 4:23

=== 1988 7" Promo Single (Sire Records 7-27858-A) ===
Side A: "Pretty Boys and Pretty Girls" (7" Edit) - 4:30

Side B: "Pretty Boys and Pretty Girls" (7" Edit) - 4:30

=== 1988 7" Promo Single (PRO-S-3281) ===
Side A: "Tubular Bells/Pretty Boys and Pretty Girls" (Medley Edit) - 4:25

Side B: "Tubular Bells/Pretty Boys and Pretty Girls" (Medley Edit) - 4:25

=== 1988 12" Maxi-Single (Sire Records 0-20963) ===
Side A:

1. "Pretty Boys and Pretty Girls" (Extended Mix) - 7:19
2. "Tubular Bells" (7" Mix) - 4:23
3. "Pretty Boys and Pretty Girls" (7" Mix) - 4:45

Side B:

1. "Tubular Bells/Pretty Boys and Pretty Girls" (Regan's House Medley) - 14:24

=== 1988 Promo CD Single (Sire Records PRO-CD-3197) ===
1. "Pretty Boys and Pretty Girls" (7" Mix) - 4:48
2. "Pretty Boys and Pretty Girls" (Extended Mix) - 7:20
3. "Tubular Bells/Pretty Boys and Pretty Girls" (Regan's House Medley) - 14:24
4. Interview - 3:43

== Personnel ==
"Pretty Boys and Pretty Girls" written by Theodore Ottaviano. "Tubular Bells" written by Mike Oldfield. All instruments arranged, programmed, and performed by Book of Love.

- Susan Ottaviano – lead vocals
- Ted Ottaviano – keyboards, tubular bells, backing vocals
- Lauren Roselli – keyboards, backing vocals
- Jade Lee – keyboards, Percussion, backing vocals

12" Sleeve Credits

- Produced by Flood and Ted Ottaviano
- Mastered by José Rodriguez at Sterling Sound
- "Pretty Boys and Pretty Girls" (Extended Mix)
  Remix, additional production an keyboards by Scott Blackwell and Bob Brockmann for Broadbeard Productions.
  Remix engineer: Bob Brockmann
- "Tubular Bells" (7" Mix)
  Mixed by Alan Meyerson
- "Pretty Boys and Pretty Girls" (7" Mix)
  Mixed by Alan Meyerson
- "Tubular Bells/Pretty Boys and Pretty Girls" (Regan's House Medley)
  Remix, additional production an keyboards by Scott Blackwell and Bob Brockmann for Broadbeard Productions.
  Remix engineers: Bob Brockmann and Hugo Dwyer
- Design by Jade Lee
- Photo by David LaChappelle

== Charts ==
Year	Song	Chart peak positions	
Year	Song	US Club Play	US Hot 100
1988	"Pretty Boys and Pretty Girls"	5	90

== Official versions ==
Year	Version	Length	Mixed/Remixed by	Comment
1988	Album version	4:26	Alan Meyerson	Found on all formats of the album Lullaby.*
1988	7" Edit	4:30	Alan Meyerson	A slightly shorter edit of the 7" Mix/Single version. Found only on the 7" vinyl single (Sire Records 7–27858) and 7" promo vinyl single (Sire Records 7–27858).
1988	7" Mix/Single version	4:48	Alan Meyerson	Found on the 12" vinyl single and the CD I Touch Roses: The Best of Book of Love.*
1988	Extended Mix	7:19	Scott Blackwell and Bob Brockmann	Found on the 12" vinyl single, CD promo single, and the 2009 reissue CD of Lullaby (Noble Rot).
1988	"Tubular Bells/Pretty Boys and Pretty Girls" (Regan's House Medley)	14:24	Scott Blackwell and Bob Brockmann	A super extended remix combining the two as a medley. Found on the 12" vinyl single, CD promo single, and the 2009 reissue CD of Lullaby (Noble Rot).
1988	"Tubular Bells/Pretty Boys and Pretty Girls" (Medley Edit)	4:25	Alan Meyerson	Found only on the 7" vinyl promo single (Sire Records 7-27858-A).

Official versions of B-side "Tubular Bells"

Year	Version	Length	Mixed/Remixed by	Comment
1988	Album version	3:00	Alan Meyerson	Found on all formats of the album Lullaby.*
1988	7" Mix	4:23	Alan Meyerson	Found on the 7" and 12" vinyl singles of "Pretty Boys and Pretty Girls".
1988	7" Edit	4:09	Alan Meyerson	A shorter edit of the 7" Mix. Found only the CD of I Touch Roses: The Best of Book of Love.*

" * " denotes that version is available as digital download
