= Book of Love (band) =

American synth-pop band

- (L–R) Lauren Roselli, Jade Lee, Ted Ottaviano, Susan Ottaviano

Background information
- Origin: New York, New York, U.S.
- Genres: Synth-pop, new wave, dance-pop
- Years active: 1983–1994, 2001, 2009, 2013–2018
- Label: Sire/Reprise/Warner Bros. Records
- Members: Susan Ottaviano; Ted Ottaviano; Lauren Roselli Johnson; Jade Lee
- Website: bookoflovemusic.com

Book of Love is an American synth-pop and electronic band, formed in 1983 in New York City. Led by vocalist Susan Ottaviano, the band also includes keyboardists Ted Ottaviano, Lauren Roselli and Jade Lee. The band gained its first exposure as the opening act for two Depeche Mode tours in 1985 and 1986. The group has been described by the Houston Press as "forward thinking" for lyrics dealing with sexual orientation and gender roles.

== Overview ==
Their biggest success came on the US dance charts, placing seven singles in the Billboard Hot Dance Club Play chart between 1985 and 1993. The group's largest exposure on pop radio was with the song "Pretty Boys and Pretty Girls", one of the first songs to openly address the AIDS epidemic. The song, from the album Lullaby, was originally the second half of a medley with the group's version of Mike Oldfield's "Tubular Bells," the 1973 instrumental that served as the eerie theme music of the classic horror film The Exorcist. Edited down to single length, "Pretty Boys and Pretty Girls" became Book of Love's only Hot 100 entry, peaking at no. 90 in 1988.

Book of Love's music has been featured in various films and television over the years. The band's song "Modigliani (Lost in Your Eyes)" was featured in the 1987 John Hughes film Planes, Trains & Automobiles as well as in the Miami Vice episode, "God's Work". In 1991, the song "Sunny Day" was featured in the movie The Silence of the Lambs, in a scene in which band member Lauren Roselli had a cameo with Jodie Foster. Also, the song "Enchanted" from the band's Lovebubble album, appeared on the soundtrack to the 1993 film Naked in New York, and the song "I Touch Roses," was featured in the 2000 movie "American Psycho". "Boy" is the last song to be heard in recent years with the movie Companion released in 2025.

Since their active years, Book of Love's songs "Boy" and "I Touch Roses" have been rediscovered by new audiences. Both their original versions and subsequent remixes are heard in both dance clubs and on alternative radio stations.

In February, 2001—sixteen years after its first dance chart entry—Book of Love had its first #1 hit on the US dance chart when "Boy," a track originally from its debut album, was remixed and re-released as the lead single from their greatest hits collection, I Touch Roses: The Best of Book of Love.

In 2013, the band reunited for a string of club tour dates and has been working on new material.

== History ==
=== Formation and early years (1981–1985) ===
Ted Ottaviano became friends and started writing songs with Susan Ottaviano while attending high school together in Connecticut. Despite sharing the same last name, they are not related, though their family ancestries trace back to the same small southern Italian village. After high school, Susan Ottaviano moved to Philadelphia, Pennsylvania to attend the Philadelphia College of Art. While at art college, Susan met Jade Lee and they formed a band named Head Cheese with friend Celeste Ries. In July 1981, Head Cheese recorded their first songs at the recording studio Third Story with producer David Javelosa. A 7" record was released on Burn Potential Records including three songs, A-sides: "Teenage Idol" and "Non-Melodic", and B-side "Jungle Jam", which has been described as "an offbeat love song to the city of Philly." Ted Ottaviano, a commuting member of Head Cheese, was one of the executive producers, co-wrote "Non-Melodic" with Susan, and also did photography for the record sleeve. While Susan Ottaviano was in Philadelphia at art college, Ted Ottaviano was attending the School of Visual Arts in New York City, where he met Lauren Roselli. For a time, the band was a long-distance creative project between Philadelphia and New York City. Book of Love was officially formed in May 1983.

The band name Book of Love is taken from the song "The Book of Love" by The Monotones. Ted Ottaviano has stated, "It's not that we had a love for that song at all, it's just the imagery worked for us. Especially at that time, when we started Book of Love early to mid-'80s, there was kind of a throwback to a lot of romanticism and we were really into that. We nicked the band name from that song, that's for sure."

In 1983, Susan Ottaviano produced a local compilation album called I'd Rather Be in Philadelphia, which was issued on Burn Potential Records and featured several bands from the Philadelphia area, including Pretty Poison. Book of Love's contribution to the compilation was the song "Henna", becoming their first song released. Jade Lee designed the album's bright orange cover that included an overlay graphic of a Philadelphia street map.

In 1984, after having completed art college, Susan Ottaviano and Jade Lee moved to New York City to unite with Ted Ottaviano and Lauren Roselli. The band members spent their evenings at Danceteria, CBGB, Pyramid Club, Mudd Club, and Hurrah. Lauren Roselli explained, "New York City was a big playground, full of misfits like ourselves. There were lots of great clubs to go dancing and hear great music and meet other artists. That was our MySpace." Throughout art school until their time in New York City, the band had been heavily influenced by the late punk scene and new wave of the early 1980s. The band has cited various influences over the years, including girl groups of the 1950s and 1960s, bubblegum, glitter, David Bowie, The Ramones, Patti Smith, early Human League, Gary Numan, Altered Images, The Psychedelic Furs, Kate Bush, Cocteau Twins, P.i.L., The Cure, early OMD, and Depeche Mode.

During 1984 and 1985, the band recorded various demos at the recording studio Noise in midtown Manhattan. One of the demos was the song "Boy", a toe-tapping tale of teen-girl angst featuring tubular bells and a skip-along beat.

Noise recording studio had many bells and chimes available at the band's disposal. Reflecting on that time, Ted Ottaviano stated, "I was fascinated with Altered Images and other bands that were incorporating bells and chimes into their music. Long brass chimes, tubular bells, whatever. It sounded right, for the time."

Keyboardist Lauren Roselli gave a copy of the "Boy" demo to disc jockey Ivan Ivan, who had recently co-produced the dancefloor hit "The Dominatrix Sleeps Tonight" by Dominatrix. Ivan forwarded the demo to Sire Records president Seymour Stein, who subsequently signed the group to his label in August 1984.

In 1985, the band began recording what would become their debut album at Unique Recording with Ivan Ivan as producer. The band recorded two tracks for the single "Boy" and the band's theme song "Book of Love". "Boy" was released as a single, and became a huge dance club hit, peaking at no. 7 on the Billboard Hot Dance Club Play chart. A rare Australian promotional video was shot for the song, featuring the band performing the song with Ted Ottaviano playing tubular bells.

After having a hit with "Boy", the band quit their day jobs. While doing promotion for the single, the band met Depeche Mode at a party hosted by Rockpool (modern rock promotion company). Subsequently, the band was offered the opening slot on the North American leg of Depeche Mode's Some Great Reward Tour. Starting in Washington, D.C., on March 14, 1985, the band, still without an album, joined the tour with Depeche Mode, playing coast to coast throughout their 15 North American tour dates.

Upon returning from the Depeche Mode tour, the band went straight into the recording studio to record "Happy Day" for inclusion on the UK single of "Boy". The remainder of the summer was spent on a small club tour of the southern states that the Depeche Mode tour had skipped over, and recording the songs "I Touch Roses" and "Lost Souls" for the next single. "I Touch Roses" was then released in September 1985. Daniel Miller, founder of Mute Records and producer of Depeche Mode, remixed the song as a single remix and an extended 'Full Bloom Version' for the European single that was released in early 1986. "I Touch Roses" became a big club hit, peaking at no. 8 on the Billboard Hot Dance Club Play chart. Because of the success of "I Touch Roses", the band got a green light to finish the album. "We were the little choo-choo train. We didn't know it at the time, but thankfully with "I Touch Roses", it was not preordained that Sire was developing us at the time. There was no grand scheme. It was more a la carte. But then people started picking up on 'Roses' and then the album happened," recalled Ted Ottaviano in 2009.

=== Debut album Book of Love, Depeche Mode Black Celebration Tour, '86 Club Tour (1986–1987) ===
Up until the end of the summer of 1985, the band had only recorded five songs ("Boy", "Book of Love", "Happy Day", "I Touch Roses", and "Lost Souls"). Following the success of "I Touch Roses", the band resumed work on the album in September 1985 at Unique Recording and Sigma Sound Studios in New York City, recording the seven new songs that would make up the rest of their debut album. Instruments the band used to record the album were various synthesizers (Oberheim Xpander, Yamaha DX-7, Casio CZ-1000, Roland Juno 6, Roland JX-8P), an E-mu Emulator sampler, piano, tubular bells, chimes, melodica, and both acoustic and electronic percussion (Yamaha RX-11 drum machine, Simmons Toms). The main songwriting duties on Book of Love fell to Ted Ottaviano, with Susan Ottaviano co-writing six of the tracks, and Jade Lee contributing to two. One of the songs recorded was a cover song of "Die Matrosen" ("The Sailor", in English), originally by the all-girl Swiss post-punk band LiLiPUT, which features a catchy chorus of whistling. Recording of the album was finally finished in January 1986.

The eponymous debut album Book of Love was finally released on April 1, 1986, during the peak of synthpop in the 1980s. "You Make Me Feel So Good" was released as the first official single from the record on July 31, 1986, and became Book of Love's first CHR radio hit. The song was remixed for the single by Jellybean and Ivan Ivan. Album track "Lost Souls", was also remixed and extended by Mark Kamins and included on the 12-inch single. In April 1986, a music video was filmed on location in New York City for "You Make Me Feel So Good" and released in late July along with the single to promote the album.

In 1986, Depeche Mode once again asked the band to be their opening act. Finally with an album to promote, Book of Love toured as the opening act on the massive Depeche Mode Black Celebration Tour, joining the band's first European leg on April 29, 1986, in Hanover, West Germany, and playing 48 shows in twelve weeks throughout the full North American leg which ended on July 15, 1986, in Irvine, California. Once the Depeche Mode tour was through, the band set out on their own headlining tour of clubs, beginning in Boston on August 8, 1986, and ending in Albion, Michigan in March 1987.

A second official and final single taken from the album, "Modigliani (Lost in Your Eyes)", was released in April 1987. The song was a dance club hit, peaking at no. 17 on the Billboard Hot Dance Club Play chart, becoming as popular as New Order and Depeche Mode singles in clubs at its peak. "Modigliani (Lost in Your Eyes)" is an ode to Italian painter Amedeo Modigliani. The track was penned by Jade Lee, Susan and Ted Ottaviano, who had been inspired by the Italian painter's works and history.

Amedeo Modigliani had always been the band's own version of a rock star. After all, we were all art school students. At the time I was working on the [Requiem Mass] remix I became submerged and almost obsessed in his life story. It read like a Bronte sisters novel. I wrote a short biography for the front cover of the 12 inch.

— Ted Ottaviano, Interview with Popdose.com – February 2008.

The cover of the single featured one of Modigliani's famous paintings of his mistress Jeanne Hebuterne, along with the short biography of the painter written by Ted Ottaviano. For the back sleeve of the 12-inch single, Susan Ottaviano made drawings of each member of the band in the style of Modigliani. Similar, yet alternate large portrait drawings of the band were later used as large stage props behind the band on their Lullaby Tour in 1989.

The four-minute 'Requiem Mass' remixed version of "Modigliani (Lost in Your Eyes)" was featured in an episode of Miami Vice on November 6, 1987, and both the original single and 'Requiem Mass' remix were used in the 1987 film Planes, Trains and Automobiles.

In 1987, Philadelphia-based satirical punk rock band The Dead Milkmen released a single ironically titled "Instant Club Hit (You'll Dance to Anything)", which hurled insults about the fans of then current popular club artists, calling them "pathetic", "art fags", "boring bisexuals", and "Danceteria types". Book of Love was specifically named with other bands The Smiths, Depeche Mode, and Public Image Ltd. with the line, "you'll dance to anything by Book of Love". The end of the song effectively lumped the bands together as "a bunch of stupid Europeans who come over here with their big hairdos intent on taking our money instead of giving your cash, where it belongs, to a decent American artist like myself."

In November 1988, the album Book of Love was made available on CD for the first time. The new CD edition included five bonus remixes.

=== Lullaby album and the Lullaby Tour (1987–1989) ===
Promotional duties and non-stop touring in support of Depeche Mode's Black Celebration tour had kept Book of Love from entering the studio to lay down ideas for their second record. In a 2009 interview, Ted Ottaviano stated, "It's the classic story. We weren't quite sure where the first album would take us, and it ended up taking us on a ride. But then we had to turn right around and write and record songs for the follow-up. I'm not sure we had enough distance, enough time, to fully grasp what this meant or entailed." In the spring of 1987, the band was finally able to lay down some demos for the next record, writing the new songs between March through August.

In late September 1987, the band eventually convened at D+D Recording and Unique Recording Studios in New York to record with esteemed producer Mark Ellis, aka Flood (Depeche Mode, Erasure, Nitzer Ebb, Nine Inch Nails), who had just produced Erasure's The Circus the previous year, along with engineering on U2's The Joshua Tree. Flood co-produced the record with Ted Ottaviano. Reflecting on the recording in 2009, Susan Ottaviano stated, "It was great to be part of some of Ted's Cecil B. DeMille-styled productions. We had a full orchestra and a bagpipe player wearing a kilt for the song "Lullaby". We also recorded the organ at Cathedral of St. John the Divine (NYC) for "With a Little Love". It was such an amazing experience." The cathedral organ drenched, "With A Little Love", marked the first Book Of Love song to feature Ted Ottaviano on lead vocals. On recording with Flood, Ted Ottaviano stated, "We spent one night there, from about 10 pm to 6 am. Flood miked the entire cathedral. He was totally game for what we wanted to do."

In December 1987, the band recorded their cover version of the song "We Three Kings", adding their own twist to the Christmas carol. The song was featured alongside tracks by Erasure, The Pretenders, Prince, and The Ramones, on the Warner Bros. Records promotional holiday album compilation Yulesville, released in late 1987. Recording in New York ended on December 18, 1987, with the band reuniting with Flood on January 1, 1988 to record vocals at the Great Hall at Hansa Tonstudio Berlin. Flood mixed "Melt My Heart" and "Champagne Wishes" and the recording of the album was finished. The remaining eight tracks were mixed by Alan Meyerson in L.A. in February, and the album mastered in March at Sterling Sound.

Preceding the album, the first single, "Pretty Boys and Pretty Girls" was released on May 24, 1988. "Pretty Boys and Pretty Girls" became one of the first songs to address the issue of the AIDS epidemic with its lyric of "Strangers in the night exchanging glances, but sex is dangerous, I don't take my chances ... safe sex, safe sex." The song became the band's highest-charting single at no. 90 in the Billboard Hot 100, and the only moment crossing over into mainstream pop. In the dance clubs, the song was a smash, and made it to no. 5 on the Hot Dance Club Play Chart, spending 11 weeks on the chart. A music video for "Pretty Boys And Pretty Girls" was shot by director Carlos Grosso and released to promote the new album.

Book of Love's second album Lullaby was released on June 21, 1988, and spent ten weeks on the Billboard 200, peaking at no. 156, the highest album placement of their career. The album sleeve is a photograph from 1872 of a girl posing as cupid, titled "Cupid Considering", by Julia Margaret Cameron, from the International Museum of Photography at George Eastman House. Opening the album is a cover of Mike Oldfield's "Tubular Bells", originally made famous as the theme from the horror movie The Exorcist. For the track, the band sampled Lauren Roselli channeling Linda Blair's role as Regan, crying "Mother, make it stop!" It flows seamlessly into the second track on the album, the first single "Pretty Boys and Pretty Girls". The two tracks were also remixed into a 14:25 minute extended medley version on the single.

The second single was the album's title track "Lullaby", featuring a galloping bassline, bagpipe drones and solo, lullaby vocal harmonies, and lush strings by a string section of 20 Juilliard students. The song peaked at no. 27 on the Billboard Hot Dance Club Play Chart and spent seven weeks on the chart. The song has become one of Book of Love's signature songs, achieving classic status among their catalogue.

The band had intended to tour in the fall of 1988, but the illness of a band member delayed the tour until 1989. In late December 1988, the band played several warm up shows including N.Y.C., five dates in Texas, and Norman, Oklahoma on January 2, 1989.

To promote Lullaby, the band headlined their own Lullaby Tour of clubs in the spring of 1989 with various local acts opening in each city. The band's U.S. tour lasted for four months, with dates spanning February 23 through June 29, 1989. The band took two weeks out of their tour schedule in mid-April to remix the track "Witchcraft", and another week in May to edit the song for the next single.

The third and final single taken from the album was "Witchcraft" and released July 15, 1989. It was the only single from the album that failed to make the Billboard charts. The track samples the classic 1960s TV series Bewitched, and also contains a chant of names of the witches/characters from the show ... "Enchantra, Endora, Tabitha, Esmerelda, Clara, Hagatha". The song features quirky deadpan rap-style vocals from Susan Ottaviano, Jade Lee, and Lauren Roselli, incanting the ingredients for a love potion. When performing the song on the Lullaby Tour, the band donned witches' hats, making it a fan favorite of the band's live shows.

=== Candy Carol album and the Candy Carol Tour (1990–1991) ===
Book of Love released their third record two years following their moderately successful album, Lullaby. After having substantial success on college radio stations and the dancefloor in the 1980s, Candy Carol was released amid the changing musical landscape of the early 1990s. In a 2009 interview, Lauren Roselli Johnson stated, "I think we had great momentum going from Book of Love to Lullaby. Then, after the 1980s were gone and the 1990s arrived with a very heavy shift in [music] genres, production became valued-or not. There was hip hop, grunge, and house music. I think we fit in less and less with that stuff. It was kind of the beginning of the end of our story."

The songs for Candy Carol were written and recorded in 1989 and 1990, and were "musically based on the late-60s pop idiom". The band's intent was to record a modern album recreating the style of late-1960s pop. Explaining the meaning of Candy Carol, Ted Ottaviano stated, "To me, Candy Carol represents melody. The purity of melody is something that can give you a good feeling the way a Christmas carol can. I don't think there is anything religious about the songs on the album. But, they are inspired by the idea and feeling of a carol. I am inspired by carols the same way I would be inspired by a Renaissance or Byzantine painting."

The band spent time recording the album at three different studios in New York City with Ted Ottaviano co-producing the record with Ben Grosse. Lauren Roselli, for the first time, contributed creatively as a songwriter, and co-wrote two songs, "Flower Parade" and "Counting the Rosaries". For the two tracks, she also took on lead vocal duties for the first time. In a 2009 interview, Lauren Roselli Johnson stated, "Ted really nurtured me and shared his process with me openly. In return, I always respected and tried to help him to hear out his vision. I think at that point, I was ready and wanted to write. Ted encouraged it and facilitated it." For recording of the album track "Turn The World", Book of Love invited thirty of their friends to the recording studio to be the singing choir in the chorus of the song. Another album track titled "Wall Song", a semi-instrumental piece, was inspired by the breakdown of the Berlin Wall, and features spoken word sections of Jade Lee reading a German version of the poem "Autumn" by Austrian poet Rainer Maria Rilke.

Recording sessions with co-producer Ben Grosse began January 15, 1990, at Chung King House of Metal, where the band laid down basic tracks for a month and a half. After the taking a break in early March to pursue individual projects, they reconvened on April 16, 1990 at The Hit Factory to record vocals until mid-May. From there, the band moved to Unique Recording Studios to record overdubs, and finishing the recording of the album on June 8, 1990. In July, the album was mixed at Pearl Sound, Detroit, MI. by Ted Ottaviano and Ben Grosse, and then finally mastered at Sterling Sound.

Candy Carol was originally scheduled to be released on October 15, 1990. The band had hoped to have the album out well before Christmas, so as not to compete with holiday releases. The remixing of "Alice Everyday" took producer Ben Grosse a couple extra weeks, causing the label to push the release back. The band decided to delay the release until the new year so that it would receive full support from the label. On the subject, Ted Ottaviano stated, "At first it really upset us because we were anticipating the release of it for almost two and a half years. But as January approached, it was obvious that it was the best thing to do because you don't get the attention you deserve when you're a smaller band."

The first single taken from the record was "Alice Everyday", released before the album in January 1991, and features sing-song vocals and a refrain consisting of a laundry list of girls' names. The title of the song "Alice Everyday" is an actual real name of a woman from the 1800s that Ted Ottaviano came across while collecting girls names in a notebook. In the dance clubs, the song was a moderate hit, and made it to no. 21 on the Hot Dance Club Play Chart, spending nine weeks on the chart. A promotional video was shot and released for "Alice Everyday" by director Rocky Schenck. There are two versions of the video, one that uses the album version of "Alice Everyday" and the other, the 'Everyday Glo Mix' version of the song. The video emulates the Candy Carol album cover, showing the band dancing and performing inside of snow globes, wearing outfits similar to the album cover.

Book of Love's third album Candy Carol was finally released on January 23, 1991, with twelve tracks, and sold 60,000 copies in the first week of release. The album spent four weeks on the Billboard 200, peaking at no. 174, the second best placing of their career. The album sleeve, designed by Jade Lee and photographed by Marc David Cohen, is of a crafted snow globe with miniatures of the band members performing amid falling snowflakes.

We were working on Candy Carol while Jonathan was working on Silence [of the Lambs]. I played him a rough mix of the record and I think he liked "Sunny Day" and felt he could use it somewhere in the film.

— Lauren Roselli Johnson, Interview with Michael Paoletta – February 2009.

The second single taken from the album was "Sunny Day", with its sun-kissed guitars, bells, and arpeggiated harps. It became the second Book of Love song to feature Ted Ottaviano on lead vocals. The single from the album that failed to make the Billboard charts but was featured in Jonathan Demme's 1991 film The Silence of the Lambs. In a strange twist of fate, Lauren Roselli was cast in the role of Stacy Hubka in the movie.

The third and final single from the album was "Counting the Rosaries", featuring Lauren Roselli on lead vocals, a whistling section, and Marc Roselli, a Jesuit priest and brother to Lauren Roselli, singing the Sanctus on the track. The song failed to make an impact on the charts.

To promote Candy Carol, the band headlined their own Candy Carol Tour of small clubs in the spring of 1991 with various local acts opening in each city. The band's U.S. tour lasted for three months, with dates spanning March 2 through June 1 of 1991.

=== Lovebubble album and disbandment (1992–1994) ===
Before work began on the band's fourth album, the band had an important band meeting. In a 2009 interview, Susan Ottaviano explained, "We asked each other, 'Do you think we can do it again?' The '80s were over and we were ushering in the '90s with bands like Nirvana and Pearl Jam. The funny thing is, when you're out there touring, you just think it's going to keep going on and on and on."

The band recorded the album in New York City at Unique Recording, the same studios where they recorded parts of their previous three records. Ted Ottaviano produced the record, making it his first time solely in the producer's seat. The album contained mixed styles and creative ideas from all four members of the group, with each member taking a turn as lead vocalist. The songs "Tambourine", "Flower In My Hand", and "Enchanted" dated back to the early days of the band and were more in the style of the first two albums, while "Boy Pop" and "Chatterbox (Pt. 2)" moved in a new club-oriented direction. "We were more fractured as a band. This fracture paved the way to a more open, freer recording process. We accepted each other more"

The track "Sunday A.M." was inspired by Junior Vasquez and Ted Ottaviano and Lauren Roselli's Sunday mornings at The Sound Factory in New York City. "Happily Ever After" featured Lauren Roselli on lead vocals, and a lyric about counting each of twelve tears after a breakup. The song contained a sample of The 5th Dimension's hit "Aquarius". The album also contains two cover songs. The first, "Sound and Vision", originally was done by David Bowie, who is one of the band's biggest heroes and inspirations. "Woyaya", originally done by Ghanaian Afro-pop group Osibisa and later covered by Art Garfunkel, features Ted Ottaviano on lead vocals, a lone drum beat, and the ambient noise of a city protest.

Before the album release, the band released the first single "Boy Pop" in May 1993, a dance track and ode to gay men, with its lyric of "brother love ... across the nation ... on the bottom or the top, when we go, we go pop ... boys united cannot be divided ...". The song became a huge club hit, peaking at no. 4 on the Billboard Hot Dance Club Play chart. A promotional video was shot showing the band at a club/bar and many muscular fit dancers.

Book of Love released their fourth record, Lovebubble, on June 15, 1993, almost two years after their previous album, 1991's Candy Carol. Lovebubble did not chart, and was released to little fanfare amidst the changing musical tides of the early nineties with grunge dominating the alternative landscape. The album's cover sleeve, a tic tac toe square of nine different images, was designed by Talking Heads' frontman David Byrne.

The second and final single taken from the record was "Hunny Hunny"/"Chatterbox (Pt. 2)", a double A-side single, released in September 1993. "Hunny Hunny" featured Lauren Roselli on lead vocals, nursery rhyme lyrics, and cascading arpeggiated synths. In contrast, the flip side, "Chatterbox (Pt. 2)", penned by Jade Lee, featured Jade on lead vocals spouting off a stream-of-consciousness lyric to a house flavored backing track. Neither song charted.

The album track "Enchanted" was included on the soundtrack to the 1993 film Naked in New York.

To promote Lovebubble, the band played a small tour of a few select small clubs in early 1994. Following the small tour, the band went their separate ways before Book of Love became obsolete.

Speaking about the 1990s in an interview, Susan Ottaviano stated, "Melody was sort of falling by the wayside and getting into a little bit more of the riffs and some of the things that we didn't fit as well, and I think that also we were having the growing pains in the band and in general about how to move forward." In a 2013 interview, Ted Ottaviano explained, "I wouldn't just say that grunge killed it. I just think it wasn't apparent that basically, musically, audiences had changed and they wanted to hear different things. We did. We were as much of a music participant as anyone else. Most of the electronic music became more dance oriented, and techno and house [industrial] went towards that direction, and then more alternative music went back to a really traditional sort of almost rock or post-punk sort of vein. It felt like the synth pop songs that we were doing didn't feel like they had a place at that moment, in a strange way, even for us. You could feel the tide change. We could've continued going on if we wanted to, we just basically felt we had sort of done our thing at that point."

=== Best of compilation and tour (2001) ===
In 2001, Reprise Records released Book of Love's first and only 'best of' collection: I Touch Roses: The Best of Book of Love, effectively fulfilling the band's Warner Bros. recording contract. It had been eight years since the release of Lovebubble, the band's eclectic final album. In the late 1990s, with the emerging electroclash scene and electronic dance music back in vogue, the musical environment was ready for Book of Love again.

We realized there isn't really all that much about Book of Love out there, and we needed to put together some type of career retrospective. If we didn't do it, no one would. So we started working on it, and finally we're here.

— Ted Ottaviano, 2001

In 2000, the band worked away at Sound Umbrella studio in New York City, preparing new songs for the release. Three new songs were recorded for the album. "Getting Faster", penned by Susan Ottaviano and Ted Ottaviano, was a dance pop number with lyrics of "slowing down and getting faster ... blue sky won't go up and up." A new track "Try", a collaboration between Jade Lee and Ted Ottaviano, featured both Susan Ottaviano and Jade on lead vocals, and a classic Book of Love arrangement. "It's In Your Eyes" was an old track that dated back to the very beginnings of Book of Love. Taking things full circle, the song was the first song originally written by Susan and Ted Ottaviano, and the band resurrected it and recorded it for the first time for inclusion on the compilation. It had only been performed live, but its inclusion is a "real gift to the earliest fans". Ted Ottaviano stated, "This is a perfect time for a retrospective. We've added great new material and we can look back at our whole body of work with real objectivity."

Another new production on the compilation was a reworking of the song "Sunny Day". Ted Ottaviano produced the new version which included guitar from Lori Lindsay, who would later collaborate with Ted Ottaviano and Lauren (Roselli) Johnson as lead vocalist and guitarist in The Myrmidons.

I Touch Roses: The Best of Book of Love was released on March 13, 2001, with sixteen tracks spanning the group's entire catalog. The compilation album failed to chart on the Billboard charts. The only singles omitted from the collection were "Witchcraft" and "Boy Pop", along with fan favorite album cuts such as "With A Little Love", "Turn The World", and "Sound and Vision".

The only single released from the record was a newly remixed version of "Boy" by DJ-Producer Peter Rauhofer in January 2001. "Boy", originally an Ivan Ivan production from the band's eponymous debut, was given a new life with additional new production from Peter. "Boy" (Peter Rauhofer Remix) became a huge club hit, peaking at no. 1 on the Billboard Hot Dance Club Play chart. Speaking about the remix, Ted Ottaviano stated, "Peter was a huge fan of the song, and he wanted to do it. It really has the essence of the original."

Double 12-inch vinyl promo copies of the "Boy" remixes were already making an impact in the clubs at the end of 2000. Between the two formats of 2 x 12 inch vinyl and CD, there are ten new remix versions of "Boy", all done by Peter Rauhofer, Headrillaz, RPO, Dubaholics, and Sound Bisquit. A second remix of "Boy" also made it to no. 2 on the Billboard Hot Dance Club Play chart.

A promotional video of the remix of "Boy" (Big Red Mix) was released featuring montage live footage of the band's performance of "Boy" from the Concert Against Aids Benefit at The Gift Center, San Francisco, on May 28, 1989.

Due to the success of the "Boy" remixes, Reprise Records commissioned a new remix of "I Touch Roses" by Markus Schulz to further promote the compilation. A promotional 12-inch of "I Touch Roses" (Markus Schulz Dark Rose Remix) backed with an instrumental remix version was released in the spring of 2001. In additional support of the greatest hits collection, the band temporarily reunited to play a small scale club tour visited cities spanning coast to coast in 2001. Following the small tour, the band went their separate ways once again.

In a March 2001 interview, Ted Ottaviano explained how the band attracted a gay audience. "Even with our first hit, 'Boy', the song was really about a bigger idea. It was about feeling different, wanting to be a part of something, and making your own way in spite of that."

=== Book of Love reissues (2009) ===
On July 21, 2009, the music company Collector's Choice/Noble Rot released remastered and expanded editions of Book of Love's entire catalog. It marked the first time many of the band's remixes were available digitally.

The band's debut album Book of Love was released as a special Silver Anniversary Edition with a bonus disc containing five demos, two remixes, two live tracks, an instrumental, and the band's hard to find cover of "We Three Kings".

The band's second album Lullaby was remastered and reissued as a single disc containing five bonus tracks, including the 14:25 minute medley of "Tubular Bells/Pretty Boys And Pretty Girls" and the hard to find B-side "Enchantra".

Candy Carol, the band's third album, was also remastered and reissued on a single disc with four bonus tracks, including the industrial tinged remix of "Alice Everyday" (Sam the Butcher Mix).

The band's final album Lovebubble was remastered and reissued as a single disc with four bonus tracks, including two remixes of the dance smash "Boy Pop".

In celebration of the reissued albums and 25 years since recording "Boy", the quartet came together yet again for a one night only show on September 27, 2009 at the Highline Ballroom in New York City.

=== Reunion and current activity (since 2013) ===
On April 27, 2013 Book of Love once again reformed to play a one off show in Houston, Texas at Numbers Night Club. Ted Ottaviano, Lauren Johnson (formerly Roselli) and singer Susan Ottaviano performed the show as a trio, as keyboardist Jade Lee was unable to attend. Most all of the hits were played with some new samples and instrumentation.

In a 2013 podcast interview, Ted Ottaviano explained Jade's absence, "Jade is creatively involved with us whenever we work on any new material. She's still a Book of Love band member. This is something from when we first disbanded in the '90s, this was the thing she basically didn't really feel as interested in pursuing with us. And on select shows, if she can be there, she will." Ted also revealed in the interview that David Bowie's surprise announcement of his album The Next Day had been the catalyst for the reunion. "I feel like we're all in a place where we would like to work on new music ... David Bowie has been a major influence on us our whole career. And even seeing him make his new album, it's just been so inspiring. In a weird way we remain music fans as much as musicians ourselves and we have been talking about it. We just take one step at a time. So, the first thing is to go down to Texas and see how this show feels. There's also been talk here and there maybe about doing another date, but nothing concrete yet."

The band eventually announced a string of five California tour dates scheduled for October 2013 (MMXIII).

On June 13, 2013, the band posted on their Facebook page announcing that Book of Love is working on new material during the summer of 2013, and will play new songs during their fall tour dates in California.

On June 17, 2016, Sire/Rhino Records celebrated the 30th anniversary of the band's eponymous debut album by releasing a new compilation titled MMXVI - Book of Love - The 30th Anniversary Collection. The release features re-mastered versions of their hits, unreleased demos, and two brand new tracks: "All Girl Band" and "Something Good". To further commemorate this anniversary, the band played a reunion show in New York City (June 23, 2016) with all four members reunited together to perform for the first time in many years. "All Girl Band" was released as a single to promote the compilation, as well as a lyrics video of the song featuring different shots of the single's artwork.

On January 19, 2018, Notefornote Music and Rhino Records released The Sire Years: 1985-1993, a CD anthology of newly remastered fan favorites culled from the band's first four albums. Earlier that month, the band announced a North American tour in support of the project.

== Post-Book of Love projects ==
In 1993, Ted Ottaviano began collaborating with vocalist Basil Lucas on a dance music project called Doubleplusgood, a term meaning "excellent" or "splendid", taken from George Orwell's novel Nineteen Eighty-Four. Doubleplusgood released a total of five songs from 1993 through 1997: "Conga Té", "Theme From Doubleplusgood", "Sunny Day" (w/Lambert Moss on lead vocals), "The Winding Song", and "Boogala". Doubleplusgood had a couple significant dance club hits with "Conga Té" reaching no. 12 on the Billboard Hot Dance Club Play chart in 1993, and "The Winding Song", reaching no. 2 in 1996.

Throughout the rest of the 1990s, Ted Ottaviano continued work doing the following remixes for other artists: The Heads' "Damage I've Done" (Sound Bisquit Vocal Mix) in 1996, Fleetwood Mac's "Landslide" (3 Remixes) in 1997, David Byrne's "Wicked Little Doll" (Valley of the Doll Parts Dub Mix) in 1997, and two remixes of Hole's "Malibu" in 1999. In the mid-2000s, he also produced the New York City band Dangerous Muse's The Rejection EP and Give Me Danger EP, as well as the group The Ones, and many other local dance bands.

Among other work, Ted Ottaviano has scored a film short by photographer Steven Klein, as well as doing music for Klein's art installation with Madonna, titled X-STaTIC PRO=CeSS.

Susan Ottaviano attended the Culinary Institute of America in Hyde Park and the Institute of Culinary Education in NYC. She is a respected and sought after food stylist and recipe developer that is known for "her creative and painterly approach to food." Her work has been described as "modern, fresh and effortlessly composed." She has styled food for ads by Macy's, Godiva, Post Foods, Kraft Foods, and also various cookbooks. Her work appeared in magazines such as Bon Appétit, Cooking Light, Men's Health, Every Day with Rachael Ray, and Oprah Magazine.

In 2003, Susan Ottaviano collaborated with Sean Niles and Andrew Wilson of darkwave band Exhibition, providing lead vocals to a cover version of Joy Division's "She's Lost Control". The song was released on the mix compilation CD Kill The DJ: A Non-Stop Mash-Up Mix By Keoki by DJ Keoki.

Lauren Roselli married and became Lauren Johnson. She continued with acting roles and appeared in the films Philadelphia in 1993, Beloved in 1998, and The Manchurian Candidate in 2004. She is a mother and continues to pursue her art through photography and video as well as contribute to the music of The Myrmidons.

Jade Lee is a graphic designer and artist, and still contributes creatively to Book of Love while preferring not to tour with the band.

=== The Myrmidons ===
In the mid-2000s, former Book of Love band members Ted Ottaviano and Lauren (Roselli) Johnson formed a new band called The Myrmidons, a reference to the name of a mythical race of ant people. They recruited former singer and guitarist of The Prissteens, Lori Lindsay, an acquaintance of Lauren (Roselli) Johnson, because she was a "musical kindred spirit." The sound of The Myrmidons is a modern throwback to the 1960s pop idiom, and showcases a love for melodies, chords, and bells. In a 2013 podcast interview, Ted Ottaviano described The Myrmidons as a "'90s band", and a branch off the tree of the 1990s post-punk/electronic bands such as Garbage and Elastica, leading up through the new millennia on the cusp of The Strokes. The Myrmidons have released four EPs, and nine original songs total.

In 2006, the band released their first two EPs: The Myrmidons EP with three songs: "Clap (See The Stars)", "Dirty Secret", and "My Favorite"; and The Clap EP with the songs: "Clap (See The Stars)", "Clap (See The Stars)" [Better Late Mix], and "What Color Is Love?" The song "Clap (See The Stars)" was featured on the Another Gay Soundtrack, the soundtrack for the movie Another Gay Movie, released on July 28, 2006.

In 2008, the band released the Golden Toys EP, which contained three new songs: "Golden Toys Pt. 1", "Golden Toys Pt. 2", and "Andy Is".

On February 5, 2013, they released The Blue EP online. The EP contains two new songs, "So I Cried" (Le Bleu Mix) and "Dizzy", as well as a new mix of "Clap (See The Stars)" (The Blue Mix).

On September 29, 2015, a compilation titled: THE GOLDEN TOYS, The Myrmidons compiled (2005-2015) was released digitally as a 10 song retrospective, and included one new track "Happy Together".

== Band members ==
- Susan Ottaviano – lead vocals
- Ted Ottaviano – keyboards, sampling, programming, piano, melodica, tubular bells, backing vocals, occasional lead vocals
- Lauren Johnson (née Roselli) – keyboards, backing vocals, occasional lead vocals
- Jade Lee – keyboards, percussion, backing vocals, occasional lead vocals

== Discography ==
- Book of Love (1986)
- Lullaby (1988)
- Candy Carol (1991)
- Lovebubble (1993)

== Concert tours ==
- Depeche Mode – Some Great Reward Tour (1985)
- Depeche Mode – Black Celebration Tour (1986)
- Club Tour '86 (1986–1987)
- Lullaby Tour (1988–1989)
- Candy Carol Tour (1991)
- Lovebubble Tour (1993–1994)
- 2001 Club Tour (2001)
- New York City Highline Ballroom show (September 2009)
- 2013 Tour (2013)
- MMXV Tour (2015)
- MMXVI Tour (2016)
- The Sire Years Tour (2018)

== See also ==
- List of artists who reached number one on the US Dance chart

== Bibliography ==
- Eric Weisbard, "Who'll Write the Book of Love: Pop Music and Pop Prose", p. 1–12 in Eric Weisbard, ed., This is Pop. Boston: Harvard University Press, 2004. ISBN 0-674-01321-2 (cloth), ISBN 0-674-01344-1 (paper).
