= Modigliani (Lost in Your Eyes) =

Single by Book of Love

from the album Book of Love
- B-side: "Mo'dub'iani"
- Released: April 1987
- Recorded: 1985–1986
- Studio: Unique Recording (New York City)
- Genre: Synthpop, new wave
- Length: 3:59 (album version); 3:53 (single remix version)
- Label: Sire Records
- Songwriters: Jade Lee; Susan Ottaviano; Theodore Ottaviano
- Producer: Ivan Ivan

Book of Love singles chronology
"You Make Me Feel So Good" (1986)	"Modigliani (Lost in Your Eyes)" (1987)	"Pretty Boys and Pretty Girls" (1988)

"Modigliani (Lost in Your Eyes)" is the fourth single released by the American synthpop band Book of Love. The song was included on the band's eponymous debut album Book of Love in 1986. "Modigliani (Lost in Your Eyes)", was released as a single in early 1987, making it the fourth and final single release from the album. The B-side to the single is a remixed version of "Modigliani" by Omar Santana, titled "Mo'dub'iani".

== Background ==
"Modigliani (Lost in Your Eyes)" is an ode to Italian painter Amedeo Modigliani. The track was penned by Jade Lee, Susan Ottaviano, and Ted Ottaviano (not related despite having the same unusual last name), who had all been art school students and were inspired by the Italian painter's paintings and history.

"Amedeo Modigliani had always been the band’s own version of a rock star. After all, we were all art school students. At the time I was working on the [Requiem Mass] remix I became submerged and almost obsessed in his life story. It read like a Bronte sisters novel. I wrote a short biography for the front cover of the 12 inch." —Ted Ottaviano on Modigliani, 2008.

The cover of the single featured one of Modigliani's famous paintings of his mistress Jeanne Hébuterne, along with Ted's short bio: "Born in Livorno Italy on July 12, 1884, Amedeo Modigliani received little recognition for his paintings and sculpture during his lifetime. He had only a single one-man show, which instead of success brought scandal because of several nude paintings. He died of Tuberculosis at the age of 36. The day after his death, his mistress Jeanne Hébuterne, pregnant with his child, leaped from a fifth story window, killing both herself and the child. Within two years ironically, Modigliani's work began to be recognized and his reputation was soon established."

The last line of the song's lyrics are in Italian: "Amedeo Amedeo, gli occhi tuoi, mi anno fatto innamorare", which roughly translates to "Amadeo Amadeo, I fell in love with you when I saw your eyes."

== Artwork ==
For the back sleeve of the 12-inch single, Susan Ottaviano made drawings of each member of the band in the style of Modigliani. Similar large portrait drawings of the band were later used as large stage props behind the band on their Lullaby Tour in 1989.

== Reception ==
The song was a dance club hit, peaking at No. 17 on the Billboard Hot Dance Club Play chart, becoming as popular as New Order and Depeche Mode singles in clubs at its peak.

== In popular culture ==
The four-minute "Requiem Mass" remixed version of "Modigliani (Lost in Your Eyes)" was featured in an episode of Miami Vice on November 6, 1987, and both the original single and "Requiem Mass" remix were used in the 1987 film Planes, Trains and Automobiles.

== Track listings ==
=== 1987 7-inch single ===
Side A:
"Modigliani (Lost in Your Eyes)" – 3:53

Side B:
"Mo'dub'iani" – 5:09

=== 1987 12-inch maxi-single ===
Side A:

1. "Modigliani (Lost in Your Eyes)" (I Dream of Jeanne Mix) – 7:42
2. "Modigliani" (Requiem Mass) – 4:01

Side B:

1. "Mo'dub'iani" – 5:09
2. "Modigliani (Lost in Your Eyes)" (7-inch Re-mix) – 3:53

== Personnel ==
Book of Love

- Jade Lee – keyboards, percussion
- Susan Ottaviano – lead vocals
- Ted Ottaviano – keyboards, backing vocals
- Lauren Roselli – keyboards

Technical

- Ted Ottaviano – re-mix, additional production, cover short bio on Modigliani
- Steve Peck – engineer
- Omar Santana – editing ("Mo'dub'iani")
- Herb Powers – mastering
- Ivan Ivan – producer
- Nick Egan – design
- Susan Ottaviano – drawings of Book of Love
- Amedeo Modigliani – cover portrait of Jeanne Hébuterne

== Charts ==
Year	Song	Chart peak positions
Year	Song	US Club Play
1987	"Modigliani (Lost in Your Eyes)"	17

== Official versions ==
Year	Version	Length	Mixed/Remixed by	Notes
1986	Album Version	3:59	Ivan Ivan	Found on all formats of the album Book of Love.*
1987	Single Remix	3:53	Ted Ottaviano	The 7-inch slightly shorter remix version edited by Ted Ottaviano. Found on the 7-inch and 12-inch vinyl singles as well as all formats of the Planes, Trains and Automobiles soundtrack, and the CD I Touch Roses: The Best of Book of Love.*
1987	I Dream of Jeanne Mix	7:42	Ted Ottaviano	Found on the 12-inch vinyl single and the 1988/1990 Sire Records' CD version of Book of Love.*
1987	Requiem Mass	4:01	Ted Ottaviano	A semi-instrumental version of the song without drums. Found on the 12-inch vinyl single and the 1988/1990 Sire Records' CD version of Book of Love.*
1987	Mo'dub'iani	5:09	Omar Santana	Found only on the 7-inch and 12-inch vinyl singles.
1987	Razormaid Remix	4:45	Matt Hite	Found only on the CD of Razormaid Records' compilation Member's Revenge 3: Alienated.
1987	Mike Carroll Remix	7:00	Mike Carroll	Found only on the 2 x 12-inch promo vinyl of Hot Tracks' Series 6, Issue 5.
2009	Instrumental	4:03	Ivan Ivan	Found only on the 2009 CD reissue bonus disc of Book of Love (Noble Rot).

" * " denotes that version is available as digital download
