= Witchcraft (Book of Love song) =

1989 single by Book of Love

Single by Book of Love

from the album Lullaby
- B-side: "Enchantra"
- Released: 15 July 1989
- Recorded: 1987–1988
- Genre: Synthpop, new wave
- Length: 3:41 (album version); 3:16 (7" version)
- Label: Sire Records
- Songwriter(s): Theodore Ottaviano
- Producer(s): Flood and Ted Ottaviano

Book of Love singles chronology
"Lullaby" (1989)	"Witchcraft" (1989)	"Alice Everyday" (1991)

"Witchcraft" is the seventh single released by the American synthpop band Book of Love. The song was the third, and final single from the band's second album Lullaby, and was released on July 15, 1989.

"Witchcraft" was the only single from the album Lullaby that failed to make the Billboard charts. The track samples the classic 60s TV series Bewitched, and also chants the names of the witches/characters from the show..."Enchantra, Endora, Tabitha, Esmerelda, Clara, Hagatha". The song features quirky deadpan rap-style vocals from Susan Ottaviano, Jade Lee, and Lauren Roselli, with a Shakespeare-inspired incanting of ingredients for brewing a love potion. Remixes on the 12" single include samples from the track "Let's All Chant" by Michael Zager Band.

The B-side "Enchantra" is a completely different composition, aside from the fact that it uses the chant of Bewitched character names from "Witchcraft".

The cover art of the 12" was done by band members Lauren Roselli and Jade Lee. It consists of a picture of a Play-Doh "queen" (done by Lauren Roselli), with refrigerator magnet lettering of the band's name and song title. Female names included as part of the back cover artwork (Enchantra, Hagatha, Clara, Endora, and Esmeralda) come from the song's chorus. The witches named in the song's chorus are all named as a part of the back cover art except Tabitha. The cover sleeve was featured in the 2011 book Put The Needle On The Record by Matthew Chojnacki, which celebrated the vinyl sleeves of records from the 1980s.

During the band's Lullaby Tour in 1989, when performing "Witchcraft", the band donned witches' hats, making it a fan favorite of the band's live shows.

"Enchantra" has been used as the intro track while the band takes to the stage during Book of Love's 2013 shows.

== Track listings ==
=== 1989 12" maxi-single (Sire Records 9 21251-0) ===
Side A:

1. "Witchcraft" (Extended Mix) – 5:15
2. "Witchcraft" (7" Mix) – 3:16
3. "Enchantra" – 2:44

Side B:

1. "Witchcraft" (Enchantra Chanting) – 6:23
2. "Witchcraft" (Dub) – 5:20
3. "Witch's Honor" – 0:05 (not listed on the sleeve)

== Personnel ==
"Witchcraft" written by Theodore Ottaviano. "Enchantra" written by Jade Lee and Ted Ottaviano. All instruments arranged, programmed, and performed by Book of Love.

- Susan Ottaviano – lead vocals
- Ted Ottaviano – keyboards
- Lauren Roselli – keyboards, backing vocals
- Jade Lee – keyboards, percussion, backing vocals

12" sleeve credits

- Produced by Flood and Ted Ottaviano
- Remix and additional production by Book of Love
- Engineered by Doc Dougherty
- Edited by Roger Pauletta
- Mastered at Sterling Sound
- Play-Doh queen by Lauren Roselli
- Art direction by Jade Lee

Side A dead wax says: "Miss Lucy’s in Heaven 4-26-89"

== Charts ==
Year	Song	Chart peak positions
Year	Song	US Club Play
1989	"Witchcraft"	—

"—" denotes that song failed to chart

== Official versions ==
Year	Version	Length	Mixed/Remixed by	Comment
1988	Album version	3:41	Alan Meyerson	Found on all formats of the album Lullaby.*
1989	7" Mix	3:16	Book of Love	Found on the 12" vinyl maxi-single (Sire Records 9 21251-0), and the Warner Bros. promotional CD compilation Follow Our Trax Volume II (1989).
1989	Extended Mix	5:15	Book of Love	Found on the 12" vinyl maxi-single (Sire Records 9 21251-0), the CD compilation Retro:Active3 - Rare & Remixed, and the 2009 reissue CD of Lullaby (Noble Rot).
1989	"Enchantra"	2:44	Book of Love	Completely different track that utilizes the "Witchcraft" chorus. Found on the 12" vinyl maxi-single (Sire Records 9 21251-0) and the 2009 reissue CD of Lullaby (Noble Rot).
1989	Enchantra Chanting	6:23	Book of Love	Found on the 12" vinyl maxi-single (Sire Records 9 21251-0).
1989	Dub	5:20	Book of Love	Found on the 12" vinyl maxi-single (Sire Records 9 21251-0).
1989	"Witch's Honor"	0:05	Book of Love	Not listed on outer sleeve. Spoken vocal of "I am a witch and a queen". Found on the 12" vinyl maxi-single (Sire Records 9 21251-0).
1989	The Warlock Edit	6:16	Jim "Hip-Hop" Hopkins	DJ only edit found only on the 1989 promo 2 x 12" vinyl compilation Rhythm Stick 1-8 (Rhythm Stick – RS1-8).
2010	Henner & Green Extended Mix	8:37	Henner & Green	Remix found only on Henner & Green's Remix Weekend (May 2010).*

" * " denotes that version is available as digital download
