= List of ethnic slurs and epithets by ethnicity =

This list of ethnic slurs and epithets is sorted into categories that can defined by race, ethnicity, or nationality.

== Broader ethnic categories ==
=== African ===
Most of these black slurs and all these African slurs apply also to Cape Coloureds. People of mixed races in South Africa are referred to as Coloured with no derogatory connections.

Af
(Rhodesia) African to a white Rhodesian (Rhodie).
Ape
(US) a black person.
Béni-oui-oui
Mostly used during the French colonization of Algeria as a term for Algerian Muslims.
Bluegum
an African American perceived as being lazy and who refuses to work.
Boogie
a black person (film noir); "The boogies lowered the boom on Beaver Canal."
Buck
a black person or Native American.
Burrhead / Burr-head / Burr head
(US) a black person, in reference to Afro-textured hair.
Bushy (s.) / Bushies, Amadushie (p.)
(South Africa) Khoisans. Historically used against the Khoisan people in Southern Africa, referring to their nomadic lifestyle and reliance on the bush for survival.
Colored
(US) a black person. Once generally accepted as inoffensive, this word is now considered disrespectful by some. The National Association for the Advancement of Colored People (NAACP) continues to use its full name unapologetically. This is not to be confused with the term "person of color" which is the preferred term for collectively referring to all non-white people.
Cotton picker
(US) Individuals of Black African descent.
Coon
(US and UK) originally used by Europeans/white people as a pejorative term for a black person. Possibly from Portuguese barracos, a building constructed to hold slaves for sale (1837). The term (though still also used in its original sense) is commonly used today by African or Black Americans towards members of the same race who are perceived to pander/kowtow to white people; to be a 'sellout'; to hate themselves; or to "collud[e] with racism for personal gain." It is often used against black conservatives or Republicans (similar to Uncle Tom and coconut). Also used to slur Cape Coloureds or Coloureds in South Africa. The association of the term "coon" with the coloured group expresses ambivalent feelings about their mixed-race ancestral background, and signifies self-deprecation, subordination, and marginalization of the underprivileged.
Crow
(US) a black person.
Eggplant
(US) A black person. Notable for appearing in the 1979 film, The Jerk and the 1993 film True Romance.
Fuzzies
(Commonwealth) A black person. Notable for appearing in the 1964 film, Zulu.
Fuzzy-Wuzzy
(Commonwealth) A Hadendoa Beja. The term is a reference to the distinctive dirwa hairstyle used by many Beja men.
Gam, Gammat
(South Africa) Used to refer to Cape Coloureds or Coloureds. It means "a person who is low or of inferior status" in Afrikaans.
Golliwogg
(Commonwealth) a dark-skinned person, named after Florence Kate Upton's children's book character.
Hapsi / Habsi
(Nepal), a term used for black person from Africa.
Houtkop
(South Africa) a black person and a Cape Coloured or coloured native. The term translates literally to "wooden head" in Afrikaans.
Jigaboo / jiggabo, jijjiboo, zigabo / jig, jigg, jiggy, jigga
(US and UK) a black person (JB) with stereotypical black features. (dark skin, wide nose, etc.) Refer to mannerisms that resemble dancing.
Jim Crow
(US) a black person; also the name for the segregation laws prevalent in much of the United States until the civil rights movement of the 1950s and 1960s.
Jim Fish
(South Africa) a black person.
Jungle bunny
(US and UK) a black person.
Kaffir, kaffer, kafir, kaffre
(South Africa) a. a black person. Considered very offensive.
Macaca, macaque
a person of black African descent, originally used in languages of colonial powers in Africa. Same as "macaque".
Mammy
Domestic servant of black African descent, generally good-natured, often overweight, and loud.
Makwerekwere, Kwerekwere
(South Africa) Used against foreigners, usually black migrants or refugees in South Africa.
Monkey
a person of black African descent. See also Macaca (slur). It also gave rise to the racist "monkey chants" in sports.
Mosshead
a black person.
Munt
(South Africa, Zimbabwe, and Zambia) a term, used among white people, for a black person. The term derives from muntu, the singular of Bantu.
Nig-nog
(US and UK) a black person.
Nigger / niggar / niggur, niger / nigor / nigre (Caribbean) / nigar, nigga / niggah / nig / nigguh
(International) a black person. From the word negro, which means the color black in numerous languages. Diminutive appellations include Nigg and Nigz. Over time, the terms nigga and niggaz (plural) have come to be frequently used between some African or black diaspora without the negative associations of nigger. Considered very offensive and typically censored as "the n-word" even in reference to its use. The terms niggress, negress, and nigette are feminized formulations of the term.
Niglet / nigglet
a black child.
Nigra / negra / niggra / nigrah / nigruh
(US) a black person, first used in the early 1900s.
Pickaninny
generally refers to black children, or a caricature of them which is widely considered racist.
Porch monkey
a black person.
Powder burn
a black person.
Quashie
a black person.
Sambo
(US) an African American, black, Indigenous American, a mixed race person, or sometimes a South Asian person.
Smoked Irishman
(US) 19th century term for black people.
Sooty
a term for a black person, originated in the U.S. in the 1950s.
Spade
a term for a black person, first recorded in 1928, from the playing cards suit.
Spook
a black person.
Tar baby
(US) a black person, especially a child.
Tea bag
(South Africa) black or Coloured or Cape Coloured individuals who have a light skin
Teapot
A black person, derived in 19th century.
Thicklips, bootlips
a black person.
Yellow bone
(US) a light-skin black person

=== Asian ===
==== East Asian ====
Celestial
(Australia) Chinese people, used in the late 1900s, a reference to their coming from the "Celestial Empire" (i.e. China).
Charlie
(US) A term used by American troops during the Vietnam War as a shorthand for communist guerrillas: it was shortened from "Victor Charlie", the radio code designation for the Viet Cong, or VC.
Chinaman
(US) Chinese person, used in old American west when discrimination against Chinese was common.
Chink
(US) a person of East Asian descent.
Coolie
(North America) unskilled Asian laborer, usually Chinese (originally used in the 19th century for Chinese railroad laborers). Possibly from Mandarin ku li (苦力) or Hindi kuli, 'day laborer'. Also racial epithet for Indo-Caribbean people, especially in Guyana and Trinidad and Tobago.
Gook
East Asian people, particularly aimed towards Koreans. The term originates from the Korean War and comes from the Korean word for country. The Korean word for the United States of America is Mee Hap Joon Gook, which is shorten to the more familiar Mee Gook. Dae Han Min Gook or the People's Republic of Korea is similarly shortened to Han Gook. The word was given a derogatory slant by American service men who used it to refer to Koreans. It was also used prominently during the Vietnam War, particularly towards the Viet Cong.
Jap
(Predominantly US) a Japanese person. Shortened from the word "Japanese", often used pejoratively.
Nip
a Japanese person. From Nippon, first used in World War II.
Oriental
(Predominantly US, used elsewhere) Refers to an East Asian person (of the Orient) and/or their ethnicity. In 2016, US President Barack Obama signed a bill to remove the term Oriental, together with some others, as a reference to a person from federal laws.
Slope
(Australia) a person of East Asian descent.
Yellow, Yellowman, or Yellowwoman
designating or pertaining to an East Asian person, in reference to those who have a yellowish skin complexion.

==== South Asian ====
Khuli (s.) / Amakhula (p.)
(South Africa) a person or people of Indian heritage.
American-Born Confused Desi, or ABCD
(US) used by South-Asian diaspora for American-born South Asians, including Indian, Pakistani, and Bangladeshi (mainly Indians, as they are the largest number of South Asians in the US) who are confused about their cultural identity. This is often used humorously without any derogatory meaning.
Brownie
a brown-skinned person of South Asian, Arab, or Hispanic descent. Rarely used as someone of Native American or Pacific Islander descent.
Chee-chee
a Eurasian half-caste, probably from Hindi chi-chi fie, literally 'dirt'.
Chinki
used in India for those from Northeast India.
Curry muncher
(Africa, Australia, New Zealand, and North America) a person of Asian Indian origin.
Madrasi
outdated exonym for the people of South India (named for the city of Madras, i.e. modern-day Chennai).
Malaun
(Bangladesh) term for Hindus.
Paki
(UK) pejorative for a person from South Asia (particularly Pakistan) and mainly used in the United Kingdom. First recorded in 1964 during increased immigration of Pakistanis to the United Kingdom and popularized during a heightened era of Paki-bashing. Although considered the 'P-Word' in the United Kingdom, it is colloquially used by Pakistanis in North America and elsewhere to refer to themselves and is not commonly perceived as derogatory when referred to as Paki by others.

==== Southeast Asian ====
Dink
Someone of Southeast Asian origin, particularly aimed towards a Vietnamese person. Also used as a disparaging term for a North Vietnamese soldier or guerrilla in the Vietnam War. Origin: 1965–70, Americanism.
Flip
(US) An ethnic slur applied to Filipinos.
Gugus
(US) a racial term used to refer to Filipino guerillas during the Philippine–American War. The term came from gugo, the Tagalog name for Entada phaseoloides or the St. Thomas bean, the bark of which was used by Filipinas to shampoo their hair. The term was a predecessor to the term gook, a racial term used to refer to all Asian people.
Huan-a
Hokkien word for foreigner, used to refer to non-Chinese Southeast Asian people and Taiwanese aborigines, considered offensive by most non-Chinese speakers.
Jakun
a person considered unsophisticated in Malaysia; derived from the name of an indigenous Orang Asli group.

==== West Asian ====
Camel jockey
an Arab.
Hajji, Hadji, Haji
pejorative term used by the US military for Iraqis, may also be used for other Muslims. Derived from the honorific Al-Hajji, the title given to a Muslim who has completed the Hajj (pilgrimage to Mecca).
Sand nigger
person who dwells in deserts, especially of Arabian peninsula or African continent.
Towelhead / Raghead
A Muslim, Arab, Sikh, or member of any group that traditionally wears headdress such as a turban, keffiyeh, or headscarf.
Turco
(Argentina, Brazil, Chile) an Arab, or less commonly a Jew or Armenian. Used after the Ottoman nationality that early Palestinian, Lebanese and Syrian immigrants had on their passports

=== European ===
Ang mo
(Malaysia and Singapore) Hokkien for "red hair" referring to Dutch people from the 17th century and expanded to all white people by the 19th century, has become a neutral term in the 21st century.
Barang
(Cambodia) any white person.
Batakusai
(Japan) westerners, especially Europeans and Americans; literally "butter-smelling". The term originates from the 19th century, as following the Opening of Japan, westerners were believed to smell of dairy products (including butter), which were not widely eaten in Japan at the time. The term survives in the present day as a descriptor for things that are 'obnoxiously western', or to refer to things of western origin.
Bule
(Indonesia) white people; literally, "albino", but used to mean any white person, in the same way that "colored" might be used to refer to a black person.
Charlie
used by African Americans, mainly in the 1960s and 1970s, to refer to a white person. From James Baldwin's play, Blues For Mister Charlie.
Coonass or coon-ass
(US) a Cajun; may be derived from the French conasse.
Cracker
(US) white people, originally and still particularly used to refer to poor white people from the American South.
Farang
(Thailand) any white person.
Firangi
(India) a white foreigner. Same word origin as Thai Farang.
Gammon
(UK) white people, especially older white men – based on the reddish appearance of their faces when flushed.
Gora (गोरा, گورا), Goro (गोरो)
(India) a person of European descent or other light skinned person in Hindi and other Indo-Aryan languages. However, it has recently been connected to racism. "Gori" is the feminine form.
Gringo
(Americas) Non-Hispanic US national. Hence Gringolandia, the United States; not always a pejorative term, unless used with intent to offend.
Gubba
(Australia) Aboriginal (Koori) term for white people – derived from Governor / Gubbanah
Gweilo, gwailo, kwai lo
(Hong Kong and South China) A White man. Gwei or kwai (鬼) means 'ghost', which the color white is associated with in China; and the term lo (佬) refers to a regular guy (i.e. a fellow, a chap, or a bloke). Once a mark of xenophobia, the word was promoted by Maoists as insulting but is now in general, informal use.
Honky
(US) a white person.
Haole
(Hawaii) Usually not offensive, can be derogatory if intended to offend. Used by modern-day Native Hawaiians to refer to anyone of European descent whether native born or not. Use has spread to many other islands of the Pacific and is known in modern pop culture.
Hunky / Bohunk
(US) A Central European laborer. It originated in the coal regions of Pennsylvania and West Virginia, where Poles and other immigrants from Central Europe (Hungarians [Magyar], Rusyns, Slovaks) came to perform hard manual labor on the mines.
Land thief
(South Africa) a white person from South Africa. The term implies that white people stole land from black people during the Apartheid era, and are therefore responsible for the current economic and social inequalities in the country.
Mangiacake
(Canada) used by Italian Canadians for those of Anglo-Saxon or Northwestern European descent. Mangiacake literally translates to 'cake eater', and one suggestion is that this term originated from the perception of Italian immigrants that Canadian or North American white bread is sweet as cake in comparison to the rustic bread eaten by Italians.
Medigan / Amedigan
(US) A term used by Italian Americans to refer to Americans of White Anglo Saxon Protestant descent, Americans of Northwestern European descent, Americans with no discernible ethnicity, or Americans of non-Italian descent in general. Comes from Southern Italian pronunciation of the Italian word americano.
Ofay
(US) a white person. Etymology is unknown.
Arkie
(US) A person from the State of Arkansas, used during the great depression for farmers from Arkansas looking for work elsewhere.
Okie
(US) A person from the State of Oklahoma, used during the great depression for farmers from Oklahoma looking for work elsewhere.
Peckerwood
(US) a white person (southerner). This word was coined in the 19th century by Southern black people to refer to poor white people.
Pink pig
(South Africa) a white person.
Soutpiel
(South Africa) a white person of British origin, from the Afrikaans sout (“salt”) + piel (“dick”), referring to figuratively having one foot in South Africa and another in Great Britain so as to have genitals dangling in the Atlantic Ocean.
Whitey
(US) a white person.

==== Mediterranean ====
Chocko
(Australia) a person of Mediterranean, Southern European, or Middle Eastern descent.
Dago
(UK and Commonwealth) may refer to Italians, Spaniards, Portuguese, and potentially Greek peoples. Possibly derived from the Spanish name Diego.
(US) refers specifically to Italians.
Greaseball, Greaser
(US especially) Greaseball generally refers to a person of Italian descent. Meanwhile, though it may be used as a shortening of greaseball to refer to Italians, greaser has been more often applied to Hispanic Americans or Mexican Americans. However, greaseball (and to a lesser extent, greaser) can also refer to any person of Mediterranean/Southern European descent or Hispanic descent, including Greeks, Spaniards, and the Portuguese, as well as Latin Americans. Greaser also refer to members of a 1950-1960s subculture which Italian Americans and Hispanic Americans were stereotyped to be a part of.
Kanake
(Germany) Used in 1960s Germany to refer to Southern European and Mediterranean immigrants, increasingly used exclusively for Turkish people.
Métèque
(France) Mediterranean or Middle Eastern immigrant, especially Italians.
Wog
(Australia) used for the first wave of Southern European immigrants to Australia and their descendants that contrasted with the dominant Anglo-Saxon/Anglo-Celtic colonial stock. Used mostly for Mediterraneans and Southern Europeans, including the Spanish, Italians, Greeks, Macedonians, Lebanese, Arabs, Croatians and Serbians.

=== American ===
==== Hispanic/Mestizo ====
Beaner
Term for Mexican, but can be used for Hispanics in general because of the idea that all Hispanics are the same.
Brownie
Someone of Hispanic, Indian, and Arab, rarely used as someone of Native American or Pacific Islander descent.
Cholo
term used by Chilean officers to refer to Peruvians and Bolivians during the War of the Pacific (1879–1883).
Greaseball
(US) Can refer to a person of Italian or Hispanic descent. More generally, it can also refer to anyone of Mediterranean or Latin American descent.
Greaser
(US) Can refer to a person of Italian or Hispanic descent. Can also refer to members of the 1950-1960s subculture which Italian Americans and Hispanic Americans were stereotyped to be a part of.
Spic, spick, spik, spig, or spigotty
A person of Hispanic descent. First recorded use in 1915. Theories include it originating from "no spik English" (originally "spiggoty", from "no speak-o t'e English"). Also used for someone who speaks the Spanish language. In the early 20th century, "spic", "spig", and "spigotty" were also similarly used against Italian immigrants in the United States and Italians in general, as well as Portuguese people.
Sudaca
(Spain) a person from Latin America or "Sudamérica".
Tonk
An illegal migrant from Mexico.
Veneco
Originally used by Venezuelans during Venezuela's oil boom to refer to Colombian immigrants who settled in the country and their descendants, being a portmanteau of 'Venezuelan' and 'Colombian'. Over time its meaning changed to refer to Venezuelans.
Wetback
A Latin American person. Originally applied specifically to Mexican migrant workers who had crossed the Rio Grande border river illegally to find work in the United States, its meaning has since broadened.

==== Native American ====
Brownie
A brown-skinned person, or someone of Indigenous Australian, American, or Canadian descent, as well as of those of Hispanic or South Asian descent.
Chug
(Canada) refers to an individual of aboriginal descent. From the native people Chugach.
Eskimo, Eskimo Pie
an indigenous person from the Arctic. Once a common term in Canada, Eskimo has come to be considered offensive and Inuit (or Inuk) is now preferred. Eskimo Pie has also been used against Inuk persons.
Indian
People indigenous to the Americas, termed by Columbus due to the fact he thought he arrived in the East Indies. The term is considered offensive by few, but is still used within the Canadian legal system.
Papoose
refers specifically to Native American children, although sometimes used to refer to children in general. From the Algonquian language family and generally inoffensive when used in such contexts.
Prairie Nigger
refers to Native Americans in the Great Plains.
Redskin
a Native American person.
Squaw
(US and Canada) a female Native American. Derived from the lower East-Coast Algonquian language Massachusett term ussqua, which originally meant 'young woman', but which took on strong negative connotations in the late 20th century.
Timber Nigger
(US) used by white Americans in reference to a Native American person.
Wagon burner
a Native American person, in reference to when Native American tribes would attack wagon trains during the wars in the eastern American frontier.
Yanacona
a term used by modern Mapuche as an insult for Mapuche considered to be subservient to non-indigenous Chileans, 'sellout'. Use of the word yanacona to describe people have led legal action in Chile.

=== Oceanian ===
==== Aboriginal Australian ====
Abo / Abbo
(Australia) an Aboriginal Australian. Originally, this was simply an informal term for Aborigine, and was in fact used by Aboriginal people themselves until it started to be considered offensive in the 1950s. In remoter areas, Aboriginal people still often refer to themselves (quite neutrally) as Blackfellas (and white people as Whitefellas). Although Abo is still considered quite offensive by many, the pejorative boong is now more commonly used when the intent is deliberately to offend, as that word's status as an insult is unequivocal.
Boong / bong / bung
(Australia) an Aboriginal Australian. Boong, pronounced with ʊ (like the vowel in bull), is related to the Australian-English slang word bung, meaning 'dead', 'infected', or 'dysfunctional'. From bung comes the phrase to go bung, "to die, then to break down, go bankrupt, cease to function [Ab. bong dead]." The term was first used in 1847 by J. D. Lang in Cooksland. The (Oxford) Australian National Dictionary gives its origin in the Wemba word for 'man' or 'human being'.
Coon
an Aboriginal person.
Gin
an Aboriginal woman.
Lubra
an Aboriginal woman. An Aboriginal word.

==== Pacific Islander ====
Boonga / boong / bunga / boonie
(New Zealand) a Pacific Islander; an alteration of boong.
Brownie
Someone of Hispanic, Indian, and Arab, rarely used as someone of Native American or Pacific Islander descent.
Hori
(New Zealand), a Māori; from the formerly common Māorified version of the English name George.
Kanaka
originally referred to indentured laborers from the Pacific Islands, especially Melanesians and Polynesians.

== Individual nationalities and/or ethnicities ==
=== African ethnicities ===
==== South Africans ====
Cape Coloureds
People of mixed race of African, Asian & European descent. While the term "coloured" may be seen as offensive in some other western countries, such as Britain and the United States of America, it is currently treated as a neutral description in Southern Africa for people of mixed race.
Japies, Yarpies
mildly derogative term for white South Africans, especially those of Afrikaner descent. From the Afrikaans term plaasjapie, meaning 'farm boy', and from the common Afrikaans first name Japie, a diminutive of Jacobus.
Hottentot, Hotnot
used to refer to the Khoekhoen indigenous people of southwestern Africa. The term is also used to slur Cape Coloureds or Coloureds

=== Asian ethnicities ===
==== Arabs ====
Arabush / Aravush (ערבוש)
(Israel) Used by Israeli people, derived from Hebrew "Aravi" (Arab).
Dune Coon
1970's Anglosphere during period of PLO terrorism; subsequently during the Lebanese Civil War.
Lebo, Lebbo
(mostly Australia) someone of Lebanese descent, usually a Lebanese Australian.
Turco
an Arab. Used in Chile after the Ottoman nationality that early Palestinian, Lebanese and Syrian immigrants had on their passports
Wog
(Australia) used for the first wave of Southern European immigrants in Australia and their descendants, contrasting with the dominant Anglo-Saxon/Anglo-Celtic colonial stock. Originally used mostly for Mediterraneans and Southern Europeans, including the Spanish, Italians, Greeks, and Macedonians, expanded to include Mediterranean people of the Middle East or Levantine, including the Lebanese.

==== Filipinos ====
Bisaya
Ethnic Visayans, "Visayan" is the anglicization of the hispanized term Bisayas (archaic Biçayas), in turn derived from Visayan Bisaya. Kabisay-an refers both to the Visayan people collectively and the islands they have inhabited since prehistory, the Visayas. The exact meaning and origin of the name Bisaya is unknown. The first documented use of the name is possibly by Song-era Chinese maritime official Zhao Rugua who wrote about the "Pi-sho-ye", who raided the coasts of Fujian and Penghu during the late 12th century using iron javelins attached to ropes as their weapons.

Promdi
From a pronunciation spelling of English "from the (province)". This term can be offending or stereotypical of people who come from countryside.

==== Jews ====
Kapo
generally used of one Jew by another.
Kike, kyke
(mostly US) used for Ashkenazi Jews. Possibly from Yiddish kikel, 'circle', as immigrant Jews who could not read English often signed legal documents with an "O" (similar to an "X", to which Jews objected because such also symbolizes a cross).
Shylock
Jews, based upon the Shakespeare character of the same name. Relates to money lending and greed.
Yid, zhyd
term for Jews, derived from its use as an endonym among Yiddish-speaking Jews. In English, yid can be used both as a neutral or derogatory term, whereas the Russian zhyd came to be a pejorative term banned by the Soviet authorities in the 1930s. However, in most other Slavic languages (e.g. Polish, Czech, Slovak, Slovene, Croatian), the term simply translates to 'Jew' (e.g. Polish: żyd) and is thus not a pejorative.

=== European ethnicities ===
==== Britons ====
Limey
A predominantly North American slang nickname for Britons, especially those from England. The term originates from the usage of limes by the British Navy to prevent scurvy.
Pom, Pommy
In Australia, New Zealand, and South Africa, the term usually denotes an English person.
Pirata
Argentine term for British people, meaning 'pirate' in English. Used before and during the Falklands conflict.

===== Scots =====
Jock
(UK) used in Southern England, occasionally used as an insult. The term became an offensive word during the war of succession with England when all Scots were referred to as Jocks.
Porridge wog
Used to refer to Scots.
Scotch
an old-fashioned adjective to refer to the Scottish.
Teuchter
a Lowland Scots word originally used to describe a Scottish Highlander, essentially describing someone perceived as being uncouth and rural.

===== Welsh =====
Dic Siôn Dafydd
(Wales) an anglicised Welsh person, an individual who speaks English and refuses to speak Welsh, or someone who turned their back on the Welsh nation.
Sheep shagger
(UK) a Welsh person, implying that the individual engages in intercourse with sheep.
Taffy
a Welsh person, arose during the industrial revolution, when many Welsh families settled in mining towns outside of Wales, or even English miners settled in Wales for work, thus; expressed a distrust for people who spoke a different language to the English.

==== Dutch ====
Kaaskop
Literally translates to "Cheesehead". Can also refer specifically to people from the Holland region when used by people in the southern Netherlands and Belgium

Tatta
Dutch person of native descent. The term originated from Dutch straattaal [nl], a type of urban slang. It is derived from the Sranan Tongo word for potatoes (patata), which the Dutch are known to eat. Sometimes used to generically mean "person".

==== Germans ====
Boches
Apheresis of the word alboche, which in turn is a blend of allemand (French for German) and caboche (slang for 'head'). Used mainly during the First and Second World Wars, and directed especially at German soldiers.
Chleuh
a term with racial connotations, derived from the name of the Chleuh, a North African ethnicity. It also denotes the absence of words beginning in Schl- in French. It was used mainly in World War II, but is also used now in a less offensive way.
Crucco
From Serbo-Croatian kruh, meaning "bread". In WWI used for Austro-Hungarian prisoners of Croatian nationality in Italian camps because, when hungry, they supposedly begged for kruh. In WWII applied to German soldiers by Italian soldiers fighting with them in the USSR and later by Italian partisans.
Hermans, Herms
Based on the common German name Hermann, pronounced to rhyme with "German".
The Hun, Huns
Initially seen on Allied war propaganda during World War I. An allusion to the legendary savagery of Attila the Hun, referenced by Kaiser Wilhelm II in a speech given in 1900, exhorting his troops to be similarly brutal and relentless in suppressing the Boxer Rebellion in China.
Jerry, Gerry
Rhyming slang (i.e., Jerry the German), primarily used in the First and Second World Wars by the British and other English-speaking nations. Based on the common given nickname Jerry, short for Jeremiah, Gerald, and other similar-sounding names.
Kraut
a German, used in Anglophone nations since World War II. The term is probably based on sauerkraut, which is popular in various South-German cuisines but traditionally not prepared in North Germany.
Marmeladinger
From Southern German/Austrian marmelade, 'jam'. The origins can be traced to the trenches of World War I: while Austrian infantry rations included butter and lard as spread, German troops had to make do with cheaper marmelade as ersatz, which they disdainfully called Heldenbutter ('Hero's butter') or Hindenburgfett.
Mof
Germans, reflecting Dutch resentment of the German occupation of the Netherlands during the Second World War. It is the second most common term in Dutch for the German people, after the regular/official term (Duitse).
Nazi
Used against any German or German-American without regard to their politics or family history, even towards those who suffered under the Nazi regime.
Piefke
a German, used by Austrians, derived from the name of Prussian military composer and band-leader Johann Gottfried Piefke. Like its Bavarian counterpart Saupreiß ('sow-Prussian'), the term Piefke historically characterized the people of Prussia only.

==== Finns ====
China Swede
(US) a person of Finnish descent.
Chukhna
(Russia) a person of Finnish descent.

==== French ====
Franchute
(Chile) used in Chile to refer to French people.
Gabacho
(Chile) a French person. According to Oreste Plath this name may derive from the one or various placenames in the Pyreneean foothills.
Frog (Eater)
(English speaking world) A reference to Frog legs

==== Irish ====
Bog-trotter or Bog Irish or Bog Wog
Irish, especially rural, derived from the widespread occurrence of peat bogs in central Ireland (remote areas considered isolated and backwards, often under the influence of landlords and the Church) and the attendant Irish practice of peat cutting for fuel.
Mick
(US and UK) an Irishman. Like Mickey, Mike, and Mikey, Mick is a common abbreviation or nickname for Michael (in English) or Mícheál (its equivalent in Irish), which are common names for Irish males (such as Mick McCarthy).
Paddy
an Irish man, derived from a nickname for Pádraig, a common Irish name for males after St. Patrick, the patron saint of Ireland. The term is not always intended to be derogatory – for instance, it was used by Taoiseach-in-waiting Enda Kenny in February 2011.
Prod
abbreviation for Protestant, especially Northern Ireland Protestants, often used alongside Taig (Irish Catholics) in expressions such as both Taigs and Prods. Like other such abbreviations everywhere, it is often used for convenience, as a friendly nickname, or as self-description, usually without any offense being intended, and usually without any offense being taken.
Taig
a term referring to Catholics in Northern Ireland, often having implications of Republican sympathy. It is derived from the Irish Gaelic forename Tadhg, and is often used alongside Prod (Irish Protestants), in expressions such as both Taigs and Prods.
Snout
used in Northern Ireland to refer to Protestants of British descent living in Northern Ireland.

==== Italians ====
Bachicha
(Chile) an Italian.
Continentale
(Italy) a neutral term used by people from Sardinia and Sicily to indicate someone's origin from the Italian Peninsula; in Sardinia, the word has taken on the general meaning of "non-Sardinian."
Dago
(US) a person of Italian descent. Possibly originally from the common Spanish first name Diego.
Eyetie
(US) a person of Italian descent, derived from the mispronunciation of Italian as eye-talian.
Gino / Gina
(Canada) A person of Italian descent who exhibits certain exaggerated "ethnic" characteristics such as excessive jewellery, big hair, and open shirts (for males).
Ginzo
(US) An Italian American.
Goombah
(US) an Italian male, especially an Italian thug or mafioso. From the Neapolitan and Sicilian cumpà and cumpari ('buddy').
Greaseball, Greaser
(US) a person of Italian or Hispanic descent. In particular, greaser also referred to members of the 1950s subculture that Italians were stereotyped to be a part of.
Guido
(US) an Italian American male. Used mostly in the Northeastern United States as a stereotype for working-class urban Italian-Americans. Derives from the Italian given name Guido.
Guinea
(US) someone of Italian descent, most likely derived from "Guinea Negro", implying that Italians are dark or swarthy-skinned like the natives of Guinea.
Macaronar
(Romania) used for Italians in general, roughly meaning "macaroni eater/maker".
Polentone
(Italy) used by southern Italians to refer to northern Italians. It stands for 'polenta eater'.
Terrone
(Italy) Southern Italians, originated in northern Italy to refer to people from the South who moved there. Derives from terra, Italian for "land".
Wog
(Aus) the first wave of Southern European immigrants in Australia and their descendants, contrasting with the dominant Anglo-Saxon/Anglo-Celtic colonial stock. Used mostly for Mediterraneans and Southern Europeans, including the Spanish, Italians, Greeks, Macedonians, Lebanese, Arabs, Croatians and Serbians.
Wop
(US) an ethnic term for anyone of Italian descent, derived from the Neapolitan word guappo, close to 'dude, swaggerer' and other informal appellations. Some etymologies popularly, but inaccurately, provided that it stands for "With Out Passport/Papers or "Working On Pavement", supposedly derived from Italians that arrived to North America as immigrants without papers and worked in construction and blue collar work. These acronyms are dismissed as folk etymology or backronyms by etymologists.

===== Sardinians =====
Sardegnolo, sardignòlo, sardignuolo, sardagnòlo
(Italy) often used to refer to the Sardinians by people from mainland Italy and Sicily; depending on the latter's local dialect, the term might also present itself in the form of sardignòlo, sardignuolo, or sardagnòlo. In Italy, Sardinia used to be considered a place of exile and sardigna, by extension, a metonymy for 'place where to dump dead or infected animals'. Being also employed in reference to animals indigenous to the island, and especially to the donkeys to which the Sardinians were often associated in mockery by the Piedmontese rulers, the term might be used in a derogatory fashion to imply some likening to them.
Sheep shagger
(Italy) used in a variety of Italian renditions by people from mainland Italy and Sicily, to refer to the Sardinians as a people whose men rather engage in bestiality than in sexual intercourse with a fellow human.

==== Macedonians ====
Ethnic slurs against Macedonians are often used in an attempt to deny their self-identification.

Macedonist
(Bulgaria) Macedonians.
Skopjan / Skopjian, Skopiana / Skopianika
(Greece) a term referencing the capital of North Macedonia.

==== Polish ====
Polack, Polak, Pollack, Pollock, Polock
(US, UK, and Canada) a person of Polish descent.
Pshek
(Russia) a person of Polish descent.
Mazurik
(Russia) a person of Polish descent. Literally meaning little Masovian.

==== Spaniards ====
Coño
(Chile) used in Chile to refer to Spaniards given the perception that Spaniards recurrently use of the vulgar interjection coño ("cunt").
Godo
(Chile) Spaniard, in reference to their Goth ancestry

==== Russians ====
Russki, Russkie
a term for "Russian" that is sometimes disparaging when used by foreigners. However, in the Russian language, it is a neutral term that simply means an ethnic Russian, as opposed to a citizen of the Russian Federation.
Moskal
(Ukraine, Belarus, and Poland) muscovite, originally a designation for a resident of the Grand Duchy of Moscow from the 14th-18th centuries.
Ryssä
(Finland) originally neutral, but today considered offensive.
Iivana, Vanja
(Finland) from the Russian given name Ivan.
Slobo
(Finland) probably from Russian слобода ('freedom'), one way or another.
Tibla
(Estonian) may refer either to Ethnic Russians or the Homo Sovieticus.
Katsap (кацап)
(Ukraine) Since 19th century.
Orc
(Ukraine) Used since the Russo-Ukrainian War.

==== Ukrainians ====
Khokhol
(Russia) derived from a term for a traditional Cossack-style haircut. Originally a joke, but today considered offensive.
Ukrop
literally "dill" (Ukrainian: укроп, Russian: укроп) a pun: Ukrainian = ukrop. The slur was used originally by Russians but was reappropriated by Ukrainians during the War in Donbas and later adopted by the UKROP party.

==== European ethnicities outside Europe ====
Buckra, Bakra
from sub-Saharan African languages, used in the U.S. and the West Indies.
Bumpkin, Country Bumpkin, Hillbilly Bumpkin
poor rural European American people, mainly those who share a rural lifestyle.
Cracker
European American people, particularly from the American South.
Good ol' boy
Rural people, especially European American, powerful people and their networks.
Hick
poor European American people.
Hillbilly
Usually refers to rural people. It originated as a term for farmers living in The Appalachian Mountains.
Honky, honkey, honkie
(US and New Zealand) a European person. Derived from an African American pronunciation of hunky, the disparaging term for a Hungarian laborer. The first record of its use as an insulting term for a European-American person dates from the 1950s. In New Zealand, honky is used by Māori to refer to New Zealanders of European descent.
Huinca
(Argentina, Chile) Mapuche exonym for European-descent Argentines and Chileans, originally applied to Spaniards.
Peckerwood, wood
rural people. In the 1940s, the abbreviated version wood entered California prison slang, originally meaning an Okie mainly from the San Joaquin Valley. This has caused the symbol of the woodpecker to be used by white power skinheads and other pro-European groups.
Redneck
Usually an insult to rural-living people; most commonly, but not exclusively, used on European Americans that live in rural areas.
Trailer trash
Mainly European American population stereotyped to live in trailer parks.
White trash
Originally an insult for European American people.
Whitey
A term for a European American (AKA a "white" person).

=== North and South American nationalities ===
==== North Americans ====
Merkin
Slang for inhabitant of the United States of America.
Yankee, Yank
Uncontracted, Yankee remains in use in the American South in reference to Northerners; contracted, Yank is employed internationally by speakers of British English in a neutral reference to all Americans (first recorded 1778). The term was first applied by the Dutch colonists of New Amsterdam to Connecticuters and other residents of New England, possibly from Dutch Janke ('Johnny') or from Jan Kees ('John Cheese').
Seppo and Septic
From Cockney rhyming slang, using the unrhymed word of "septic tank" in reference to "Yank" above.
Canuck
A person from Canada, especially somebody whose first language is French.

==== Argentines ====
Argie
Mildly derogatory British term for Argentinian people, popularised in the British press during the Falklands conflict.
Curepí
A common term used by people from Paraguay for people from Argentina, it means "pig's skin".
Cuyano
Chilean term for Argentines after the historical Cuyo Province.

==== Chileans ====
Roto
a Chilean. The term is used with negative conotations in Bolivia and Peru, but in Chile itself it can be seen as positive reference to the ordinary and hardy Chilean.
Chilote
a Chilean in Argentina

==== Cubans ====
Cuban nigger
white Cubans, used by Anglo Americans in 1900s Tampa.
Cubiche
Cubans, used by Spanish speakers. Is also used as an endearing term amongst Cubans.
Gusano
Cuban exiles. The term was coined by Fidel Castro, who called Cubans leaving in the Freedom Flights gusanos ('worms') and insisted the Cuban exiles were capitalists who had profited during the pre-Castro era.
Jews of the Caribbean
Cubans living in Puerto Rico were called "Jews" in reference to the economic success of Cubans in Puerto Rico.
Palestino
Eastern Cubans living in Havana, often with implication that they are black and/or an illegal migrant. The term "Palestino" means "Palestinian" in English. The term refers to the fact that Eastern Cubans are often refused entry into Havana, and those who illegally migrate are compared to Palestinian refugees.
Tally wop
black Cubans, used by Anglo Americans in 1900s Tampa.

== Crossed ethnicities ==
=== African-European ===
Coon
(US) first used as by white people, the pejorative term is commonly used by African Americans or Black Americans today towards African/Black Americans who are perceived to pander/kowtow to white people; to be a 'sellout'; to hate themselves; or to "collud[e] with racism for personal gain." Often used against black conservatives or Republicans. (Similar to Uncle Tom and coconut.)
Mulatto
(Americas, originally) a term used to refer to a person who is born from one white parent. The term is generally considered archaic by some and inadvertently derogatory, especially in the African American community. The term is widely used in Latin America and Caribbean usually without suggesting any insult. Historically in the American South, the term mulatto was applied also at times to persons with an admixture of Native Americans, and African Americans in general. In early American history, the term mulatto was also used to refer to persons of Native American and European ancestry.
Uncle Tom / Uncle Ruckus
(US) a term, used by American (especially Black) minorities, for African, Latin, or Asian American who are perceived to pander to white people; " to hate themselves; or to be a 'sellout'. Uncle Tom derives from the title character of Harriet Beecher Stowe's Uncle Tom's Cabin. Uncle Ruckus, used as an alternative to Uncle Tom, is the name of a character from a TV series, The Boondocks, in which the character satirizes the "Uncle Tom" stereotype. Both terms have been popularly used against black conservatives or Republicans. (Similar to coon and coconut.)
Oreo
Africans who practice white culture, referring to an oreo cookie: "black on the outside, white on the inside".
Aunt Jemima / Aunt Jane / Aunt Mary / Aunt Sally / Aunt Thomasina
(US) a term, used by black people, for a black woman who "kisses up" to white people; a "sellout"; a female counterpart of Uncle Tom. (Similar to Coconut.) The term is taken from the popular syrup of the same name, wherein the titular Aunt Jemima is represented as a black woman.
Afro-Saxon
(North America) a young white male devotee of black pop culture.
Ann, Miss Ann
a term used by black people to either denote a white woman or a black woman who acts too much like a white one. While Miss Ann (or just plain Ann) is a derisive reference to the white woman, by extension it is applied to any black woman who puts on airs and tries to act like Miss Ann.
Wigger/Wigga, wegro
a slang term for a white person who allophilically emulates mannerisms, slangs (ebonics), and fashions stereotypically associated with urban African Americans; especially in relation to hip hop culture.
Rhineland Bastard
used in the Weimar Republic and Nazi Germany to refer to Afro-German children of mixed German and African parentage, who were fathered by Africans serving as French colonial troops occupying the Rhineland after World War I.

=== African-Native American ===
Mulatto
(Americas, originally) a person who is born from one white parent. The term is generally considered archaic by some and inadvertently derogatory, especially in the African American community. The term is widely used in Latin America and Caribbean usually without suggesting any insult. Historically in the American South, the term mulatto was applied also at times to persons with an admixture of Native Americans, and African Americans in general. In early American history, the term mulatto was also used to refer to persons of Native American and European ancestry.
Zambo
are racial terms used in the Spanish and Portuguese Empires and occasionally today to identify individuals in the Americas who are of mixed African and Amerindian ancestry (the analogous English term, considered a slur, is sambo).
Lobos
In Mexico, black Native Americans are known as lobos (literally meaning wolves), they formed a sizeable minority in the past.

=== European-Asian/Latin American/Pacific Islander ===
American-Born Confused Desi, or ABCD
(US) a term used for American-born South Asian, such as Indians, Pakistanis, and Bangladeshis, who are confused about their cultural identity. This is often used humorously without any derogatory meaning.
Banana
(North America, UK, and Malaysia) an East Asian person living in a Western country (e.g. East Asian American) who is "yellow on the outside, white on the inside". Used primarily by East Asian people to indicate someone who has lost touch with the cultural identity of his or her parents.
Coconut
(US, UK, Australia, and New Zealand) Named for coconuts, which are brown on the outside and white on the inside, the term is used globally for a person of color who adapts to, or is adopted by, European society. This term is used in the United States for a person of Hispanic or South Asian descent, in the United Kingdom for British Asian people, and in Australia and New Zealand for a Pacific Islander.

=== European-Native American ===
Mulatto
(Americas, originally) a term used to refer to a person who is born from one white parent. The term is generally considered archaic by some and inadvertently derogatory, especially in the African American community. The term is widely used in Latin America and Caribbean usually without suggesting any insult. Historically in the American South, the term mulatto was applied also at times to persons with an admixture of Native Americans, and African Americans in general. In early American history, the term mulatto was also used to refer to persons of Native American and European ancestry.
Apple
(North America) a Native American who is "red on the outside, white on the inside". First used in the 1970s, the term is primarily employed by other Native Americans to indicate someone who has lost touch with their cultural identity.

== Other ethnic groups ==
=== Romani ===
The Romani people are an Indo-Aryan ethnic group who traditionally lived a nomadic, itinerant lifestyle in Europe but are also found outside Europe in particular in the Middle East and the Americas.

Gypsy, Gyppo, gippo, gypo, gyppie, gyppy, gipp, gyp, gip
Derived from "Egyptian", Egypt being mistakenly considered these people's origin. The name gypsy is embraced by some Romani and rejected by others.
Cigan, Zigeuner
(Serbia) derives from Athinganoi, Greek for "untouchable", on the belief they were connected to a Manichean sect. The German equivalent is Zigeuner. The related Russian word цыгане (tsygane), however, is used in a neutral manner, but is becoming dated and replaced with the Russian equivalent of Romani.

== See also ==
- List of ethnic slurs
- List of common nouns derived from ethnic group names
- List of regional nicknames
- List of religious slurs
- Lists of nicknames – nickname list articles on Wikipedia
- Hate speech
- Pejorative
