= Glossary of names for the British =

This glossary of names for the British include nicknames and terms, including affectionate ones, neutral ones, and derogatory ones to describe British people, Irish people and more specifically English, Welsh, Scottish and Northern Irish people. Many of these terms may vary between offensive, derogatory, neutral and affectionate depending on a complex combination of tone, facial expression, context, usage, speaker and shared past history.

== Terms for the British in English ==
=== Brit ===
Brit is a commonly used term in the United States, the Republic of Ireland and elsewhere, shortened from "Briton" or "Britisher".

=== Limey ===
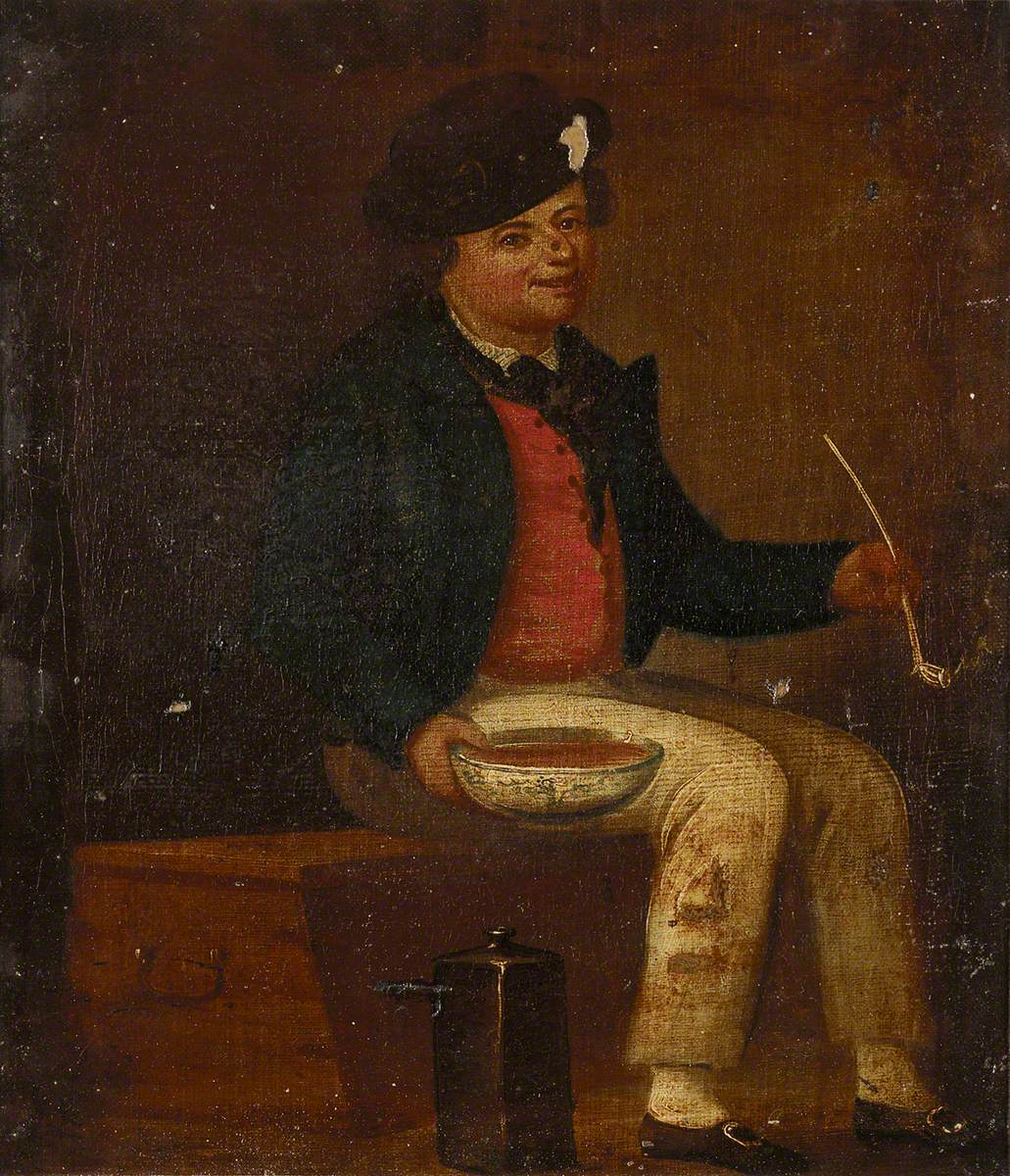
British sailor, c. 1790

"Limey" (from lime / lemon) is a predominantly North American slang nickname for a British person. The word has been around since the mid-19th century. Intended as a pejorative, the word is not commonly used today, though it retains that connotation.

The term is thought to have originated in the 1850s as lime-juicer, later shortened to "limey", and was originally used as a derogatory word for sailors in the Royal Navy. It derives from the Royal Navy's practice, since the beginning of the 19th century, of adding lemon juice or lime juice to the sailors' daily ration of watered-down rum (known as grog), in order to prevent scurvy. Initially, lemon juice (from lemons imported from Europe) was used as the additive to grog on the Royal Navy ships, but that was later switched to limes, which were grown in British colonies. It was not understood that limes contain only half as much vitamin C as lemons. Moreover, processing and storing the juice further reduced the amount of vitamin C present, and as a result, lime juice-based grog was not able to prevent scurvy.

In time, the term lost its naval connotation and was used to refer to British people in general and, in the 1880s, British immigrants in Australia, New Zealand, and South Africa. Although the term may have been used earlier in the US Navy as slang for a British sailor or a British warship, such a usage was not documented until 1918. By 1925, the usage of limey in American English had been extended to mean any British person, and the term was so commonly known that it was featured in American newspaper headlines.

=== Pommy or pom ===
The terms pommy, pommie, and pom used in Australia, South Africa, and New Zealand usually denote a British person. Newspapers in Australia were using the term by 1912, with it appearing first in Western Australia, and was said to be short for pomegranate, with the terms "jimmy" and "jimmigrant" also in use. The term Ten-pound Pom refers to British (subsidised) migrants to Australia and New Zealand after World War II.

Disputes about whether the term Pom is derogatory or offensive have occurred since 1925. The Oxford Dictionary defines its use as "often derogatory", but after complaints to the Australian Advertising Standards Board about five advertisements using the term "poms", the board ruled in 2006 that these words are inoffensive, in part because they are "largely used in playful or affectionate terms". The New Zealand Broadcasting Standards Authority made a similar ruling in 2010. The BBC, the British national broadcaster, has used the phrase on occasion.

There are several folk etymologies for "pommy" or "pom". The best-documented of these is that "pommy" originated as a contraction of "pomegranate". According to this explanation, "pomegranate" was Australian rhyming slang for "immigrant" (like "Jimmy Grant"). Usage of "pomegranate" for English people may have been strengthened by a belief in Australia that sunburn occurs more frequently amongst English immigrants, turning those with fair skin the colour of pomegranates.

Another explanation – now generally considered to be a false etymology – was that "pom" or "pommy" were derived from an acronym such as POM ("prisoner of Millbank"), POME ("prisoner of Mother England") or POHMS ("prisoner of Her Majesty's Service"). However, there is no evidence that such terms, or their acronyms, were used in Australia when "pom" and "pommy" entered use there. Other theories are that they come from the use of "pom-pom" guns by the British in the First and Second Boer Wars, from a corruption of "Tommy Atkins", or from "Pompey", a nickname for Portsmouth.

=== Tan ===
A pejorative used colloquially in Ireland, referring to the Black and Tan forces supplied by David Lloyd George to Ireland during the Irish War of Independence in order to assist the Royal Irish Constabulary (RIC) in combating the Irish Republican Army (IRA). The force was composed mainly of First World War British Army veterans, who wore distinctive Khaki British Army uniforms with dark RIC overcoats. The term's use is often used in Irish republican contexts. By extension, Great Britain is sometimes referred to as "Tanland".

=== Tommy ===
The name Tommy for any soldier in the British Army is particularly associated with World War I. The German, the French and the British Commonwealth armies used the name "Tommy" for British soldiers. "Tommy" is derived from the name "Tommy Atkins" which had been used as a generic name for a soldier for many years (and had been used as an example name on British Army registration forms). The precise origin is the subject of some debate, but it is known to have been used as early as 1743. Rudyard Kipling published the poem "Tommy" (part of the Barrack Room Ballads) in 1892 and in 1893 the music hall song "Private Tommy Atkins" was published with words by Henry Hamilton and music by S. Potter. In 1898 William McGonagall wrote "Lines in Praise of Tommy Atkins". The term is still used today in the British Army in the abridged version "Tom", especially in the Infantry Regiments, to specifically refer to a junior enlisted soldier.

== In languages other than English ==
=== Europe ===
In Finnish the abbreviation of iso-britannialainen (literally "Great/Large Briton") Britti is colloquially most commonly used for a British person, often also referring interchangeably to a person from England.

In Poland, a regular formal term to describe an English man is Anglik, in plural Anglicy, derived from the Polish word for England, Anglia, with the word Brytyjczyk meaning a British from the Polish name for Britain. Polish people often use terms Anglik and Anglia to talk about the whole UK, including Scotland, Wales etc. Derogatory or disdainful (or sometimes just funny or ironic) terms coined in recent years are Angol and Brytol however, due to negative connotations they are not used in formal writing or by the media or are used in social media and various alternative sources with varied connotations.

In the Czech Republic the term Anglán is often used, which has the same roots as the Polish Anglik – the Czechs call England Anglie. This word carried no derogatory connotations. However, unlike the formal Angličan, it is not used by the press because of its informality.

In Hungary the English are called angol or in plural angolok. England is called Anglia. British people in general are called brit or in plural britek but the term is less widespread and very uncommon. Great Britain is called Nagy-Britannia but the United Kingdom is called Egyesült Királyság.

==== Inselaffe / Insel-Affe ====
Inselaffe ("island ape") is a pejorative German term allegedly dating back to English scientists Darwin and Wallace's publications on evolution.

==== Rosbif/Rosbeef/Bife ====
The original explanation of the French term rosbif is that it referred to the English tradition of cooking roast beef, and especially to the song "The Roast Beef of Old England".

In Portugal, the term bife (literally meaning 'steak', but sounding like "beef") is used as a slang term to refer to the English. There is a feminine form, bifa, mainly used to refer to English female tourists in Portugal.

==== Les goddams ====
Les goddams (sometimes les goddems or les goddons) is an obsolete ethnic slur historically used by the French to refer to the English, based on their frequent expletives. The name originated during the Hundred Years' War (1337–1453) between England and France, when English soldiers achieved notoriety among the French for their frequent use of profanity and in particular the interjection "God damn".

==== Brittunculi ====
In one of the Vindolanda tablets from Hadrian's Wall the pejorative Latin word Brittunculi (wretched little brits).

=== Africa ===
Afrikaans speakers may use the term rooinek (literally 'red neck', another reference to sunburning) in reference to the British, or to White South Africans of British descent. During the Second Boer War, the British became known as khakis, in reference to the colour of their uniforms – which, by then, was no longer the red coats as those were unsuitable for the South African climate.

Another now largely archaic term used by Afrikaners to describe South Africans of British descent is soutie or soutpiel, meaning 'salty' or 'salty penis' respectively. The meaning behind this is that they have one foot in Britain and one foot in South Africa, leaving their penis to hang in the salty sea water.

In the East African Bantu languages mzungu has come to mean any white European but more often than not especially the British or English, due to their prior presence in the region.

In Somalia and Somaliland, the English are commonly referred to as Gaal Cad (literally, white infidel). During the 19th and 20th century British colonial campaign of Somaliland, members of the Dervishes coined this term as a descriptive term towards the British who they considered to be their enemy. There are many lines of poetry recited by renowned Somali poets from that era in which they use that term to refer to the British. It is often still used today to describe any non-Muslim European in general.

=== Latin America ===
Argentinians use the Spanish term pirata (pirate) to pejoratively refer to the British, in reference to the longstanding Falklands dispute.

=== Middle East ===
During the British Mandate in Palestine, British troops of the 6th Airborne Division were often referred to as כלניות or Kalaniot, being Hebrew for Anemones, reflecting their red berets.

In Iraq, British occupying forces post WWI were known as “Abu Naji”

=== Indian subcontinent ===
In Hindi, Hindustani and Urdu the term Angrez is used to refer to the British. This word has its origin in Portuguese Inglês, meaning 'Englishman'. A derivative is the term Angrezan or Angrezni, meaning an Englishwoman. Among the Europeans, the Portuguese were the first to arrive in India. The influx of the Portuguese led to language contact between their tongue and the local languages. As a consequence of this, a Portuguese pidgin developed that served as the lingua franca.

The term Farangi (Franks) has been used in Persian language since the 13th century to refer to all Europeans, Western Europeans in particular. Hindustani/Hindi has adopted this word from Persian and it is used to refer to the Europeans in general (including the British).

The adjective Gora (Gori for females) is also commonly used amongst Britons with subcontinental roots to refer to white Britons, although the term literally translates to 'fair-skinned one', and thus could and is applied to individuals of any ethnicity with a fair complexion, including British Asians themselves. The adjective has also been used as a noun to describe white people – hence its potential usage as a racial slur.

In Nepal, the British are often referred to as Kuires/Khaires, which means 'people of white or pale colour'. It is also used in general for any European person with white skin.

Ingraj is used in Maharashtra (Marathi) and West Bengal (Bengali) in India to refer to British people. The word Vilyati is also used for describing British people. It comes from Vilayat for foreign land. The English variation of Vilayat is Blighty.

Malayalis of Kerala use the term Sayyippu or Vellakkaran to refer to a male westerner.

In Assam (which became part of British India in 1828), the British are called Boga Bongal (literally meaning 'white foreigners' or 'white intruders').

In Tamil Nadu the Tamil word Vellaikaaran means 'white man' and usually refers to members of the British colonial government in the 18th to 19th century. It is used in the present day to refer anyone who is White with European origin; many rural Tamil villagers still believe that all Europeans are either British or of British descent.

=== Southeast Asia ===
In Malaysia, one common Malay equivalent is Mat Salleh. The term may have originated from the general depiction of Royal Navy sailors who were often drunk (Mad Sailors); due to the locals' unfamiliarity with English, it became corrupted as mat salleh (Mat and Salleh are both typical Malay names). Another possible origin of the phrase is the Mat Salleh Rebellion, led by North Borneo chief Mat Salleh, against the British North Borneo Company during the late 19th century. Another alternative to mat salleh is orang putih (literally 'white people' in Malay) or its shortened rural form, omputih. In ancient Malaccan times, the term orang deringgi was also used. Balanda from Hollander is another word from Malay used by Makassarese and in northern Australia.

In Thai, the word anggrit (อังกฤษ) is used to describe both the English in particular, and the British in general. In everyday speech the word Farang (ฝรั่ง) is usually used to describe British people as well as other light-skinned Europeans. Some foreigners regard this word as racist. In journalism, the expression puu dee (ผู้ดี) meaning 'nobleman' is sometimes used to denote 'English'.

Southeast Asian Hokkien and Teochew speakers also call the British ang mo (紅毛), which literally means 'red-haired'. The term was originally used to describe Dutch traders, but is now used for all white people.

=== East Asia ===
The following terms are used to mean 'Britain' or 'British' and use etymologies mostly unrelated to "Britain":

- Chinese: Yīngguó (Simplified characters: 英国, Traditional characters: 英國)
- Japanese: Eikoku (Kanji: 英国)
- Korean: Yeongguk (Hangul: 영국, Hanja: 英國)
- Vietnamese: Anh Quốc (Chữ nôm: 英國)

These terms are also used to refer to England in unofficial contexts. More formal names also exist, such as the Chinese 聯合王國 Liánhéwángguó and Japanese 連合王国 Rengōōkoku literally meaning 'United Kingdom'. Separate words exist in all of these languages for each of the constituent parts of the UK, including England, although, as elsewhere, there is little awareness of correct usage. The Chinese Dàbùlièdiān (Hanzi: 大不列颠) is used for historical purposes to mean 'Great Britain'. The first character means 'Great' and the other three have unrelated meanings, having been selected for the sound instead of meaning. In Chinese, yīngjílì (Simplified characters: 英吉利), a transliteration of English, is also used to refer Britain in general.

The Chinese Yīngguó, the Japanese Eikoku, and the Korean "Yeongguk" are all derived from the traditional Chinese characters 英国/國, where the first character 英 has no meaning in this context, although in Chinese, 英 is phonetically similar to "Eng", as in "England", and the second character 国 means 'country', 'nation', or 'kingdom'. While Korean is now written in the phonetic Hangul alphabet, when writing or using Chinese characters Koreans will use the traditional character for "kingdom," 國, rather than its simplified counterpart 国, which is in everyday use in China and Japan.

In Hong Kong, gweilo (pronounced [kʷɐ̌i lǒu]) is a slang word to generally refer to white westerners. It has a history of racial degradation, however it can be used non-racially and more generally in modern Hong Kong. "Gwei" means ghost and "lo" means guy, referring to their pale skin.

In Japanese, the term Igirisu (Katakana: イギリス) is used interchangeably with Eikoku, but is considered slightly more foreign because it comes from the Portuguese word Inglês (English) – despite this origin, Igirisu refers to the United Kingdom as a whole, and not specifically to England, which is Ingurando (Katakana: イングランド) and so Igirisu is more commonly used.

=== Oceania ===
As with the South East Asian term Farangi and the Northern Australian term Balanda (see above), the Māori term Pākehā and general Polynesian term Palagi have been used generically for Europeans for many years; given that the predominant early European settlers in Australia, New Zealand and many Pacific islands spoke English, these terms are occasionally used specifically for English or British people. The Māori term for the English language, for instance, is Reo Pākehā.

== Names for the peoples of the United Kingdom ==
=== Alternative names for English people ===
- The Celtic languages of the British Isles use terms derived from Old English Seaxan, 'Saxon', possibly itself derived from Old English seax:
  - Scottish Gaelic: Sasannach, in older literature Sacsannach / Sagsananch; the English language is Beurla. Sassenach is still used by Scottish speakers of English and Scots to refer to English people, mostly negatively.
  - Cornish: Sows, plural Sowson; the English language is Sowsnek
  - Welsh: Sais, plural Saeson; the English language is Saesneg
  - Irish: Sasanach, historically also having the colloquial meaning "Protestant"; the language is Béarla, short for Sacs-Bhéarla "Saxon language"
  - Manx: Sostynagh, plural Sostynee; the English language is Baarle, from Irish
- 'Southrons' – the historical Scots language name for the English, largely displaced since the eighteenth century by "Sassenachs".
- 'Overner' – A term used by residents of the Isle of Wight to refer to people from the English mainland and elsewhere.
- 'White settlers' is a term used by some Scottish and Welsh nationalist groups for English emigrants living in Scotland and Wales.

=== Alternative names for Scottish people ===
- Jock
- Sweaty, rhyming slang (Sweaty Sock / Jock) (offensive)
- Sawney (now obsolete)

=== Alternative names for Welsh people ===
- Gog, person from North Wales (from the Welsh "gogledd": north)
- Hwntw, person from South Wales (from the colloquial southern Welsh "hwnt" meaning "over there")
- Taff (or taffy) from the Welsh name Dafydd

=== Alternative names for Northern-Irish people ===
- Mick (offensive)
- Norn Iron or Norn Irish – Northern Ireland and Northern Irish, respectively – derived from the pronunciation in the local accent.
- Paddy (offensive)
- Taig (offensive)
- Fenian (offensive)
- Hun (offensive term used for those who are ethnically British)

=== Regional alternative names ===
In most cases regional names are associated with those who speak with a specific regional accent, distinct to the area.

- Appleknocker and Caulkhead – Isle of Wight
- Brummie – Birmingham
- Chissit – Leicester
- Cockney – East London
- Dumpling – Norfolk
- Geordie – Newcastle upon Tyne and Gateshead
- Jack – Swansea (possibly after Swansea Jack)
- Janner – Plymouth
- Jeelie or Jeelie eater – Vale of Leven
- Lanky – Lancashire
- Mackem – Sunderland
- Manc – Manchester
- Monkey hanger – Hartlepool
- Moonraker - Wiltshire
- Pie Eater – Wigan
- Raddle Man – Rutland
- Sand Dancer – South Tyneside
- Scouser – Liverpool
- Smoggie – Teesside
- Stokie and Potter – Stoke-on-Trent
- Tyke – Yorkshire
- Weegie – Glasgow
- Woolyback or "Wool" – Towns bordering Liverpool
- Wurzel – South West England
- Yam yam – Black Country
- Yellowbelly – Lincolnshire
- Yonner – Oldham and Rochdale
- Yorkie – Yorkshire
- Scum/Scummer & Skate – Southampton and Portsmouth respectively (offensive, originating from the South Coast Derby)

== See also ==
- Britons (historic)
- Terminology of the British Isles
- Blighty
- List of British regional nicknames
- List of ethnic slurs and epithets by ethnicity
