= Name of the Franks =

Ethnic name etymology

The name of the Franks is generally assumed to derive from the Germanic language spoken by the earliest groups identified under this name, although its precise origin remains uncertain.

The collective term Franks first appears in Roman sources of the third century AD, referring to a coalition of Germanic groups previously known under separate tribal names. In subsequent centuries, the Frankish Empire emerged as the principal successor to Roman authority in Western Europe, and the semantic range of Frank-related terms broadened accordingly. The name Frank likewise shifted in meaning: originally denoting a specific group of Germanic-speaking peoples, it came to encompass a much wider segment of the European population. At various periods, it functioned not solely as an ethnic designation but also as a political or legal category, identifying individuals according to their status within Frankish-ruled territories.

Several regional terms are derived from the ethnonym, including Francia and Franconia. Francia originally denoted the territory inhabited by Frankish groups along the lower Rhine, but the term later developed into the name of modern France. Franconia, now a historical region in central Germany, likewise reflects earlier associations with ruling elites perceived as Frankish.

== Name origins ==
=== Attestations ===
The name of the Franks is first attested in Latin as Franci (singular Francus) during the 3rd century AD. The Franks themselves spoke West Germanic dialects related to modern German and Dutch, but there are very few surviving examples of this language. The medieval Germanic forms Franchon (Old High German), Francan (Old English) and Frankar ~ Frakkar (Old Norse) point to an original n-stem *Frank-an- or *Frank-on- in the Frankish language.

=== Etymology ===
According to a traditional interpretation, the Franks were named after their characteristic weapon, a type of spear called the *frankōn (reconstructed from OE franca 'javelin, lance' and ON frakka 'javelin, dart'), in a process analogous to the Saxons, whose name is commonly derived from the Proto-Germanic name for a fighting knife or dagger, *sahsōn (cf. OE seax; ON sax; OHG sahs).

An alternative explanation derives the ethnonym from Proto-Germanic *frankaz ('fierce, bold, eager to fight'), interpreted as a nasalised variant of the better-attested *frak(k)az ~ *frekaz, meaning 'greedy, violent' (cf. ON frǣc; Middle Low German vrak 'voracious, greedy'). This interpretation is supported by contemporary assessments of the Franks: Isidore mentions the ferocitas of the Franks in his Etymologiae, Libanius emphasises their recklessness and audacity, Ermoldus Nigellus writes that the Franks received their name because of their wildness, and Emperor Valentinian likewise says that the Franks are named because of their hardness like iron and their ferocity. On this view, the spear *frankōn is not the source of the ethnonym but a secondary formation meaning 'the Frankish weapon', a process paralleled by francisca, the throwing axe of the Franks, which is an ellipsis of securis francisca ('Frankish ax').

By the end of the 6th century AD, the tribal name francus came to be used as an adjective meaning 'free' in Medieval Latin, presumably because the Franks were exempt from taxation within the territories they had conquered in northern Gaul, or more generally because they possessed there full freedom in contrast to native Gallo-Romance speakers. Already in the 10th century, some authors have postulated that Francus ('Frank') is derived from an adjective francus ('free'), so that the Franks would be 'the free ones'. However, the term with this meaning is first attested in Romance languages, and the adjective thus probably instead derives from the tribal name. The English word frank ('free of servitude'; later 'candid, outspoken, unreserved') stems from the Old French franc ('free of servitude'; later also 'noble'), itself from Medieval Latin francus.

=== Folk etymologies ===
In a tradition going back to the 7th-century Chronicle of Fredegar, the name of the Franks comes from a legendary founder figure named Francio, who first led the Franks to settle on the Rhine and started to build a city named Troy there, after ancient Troy where his own ancestors supposedly came from. The city he had in mind is likely to be the real Roman city now known as Xanten, but then known as Colonia Traiana, which was really named after Trajan, but was known as Troja minor (lesser Troy) in the Middle Ages. Isidore of Seville (died 636) said that there were two proposals known to him about the origin of the Frankish name. Either the Franks took their name from a war leader called Francus, or else their name referred to their wild manners (feritas morum).

== Geographical derivatives ==
=== Frankish empire ===
Carolingian Empire (green) in 814

Under the reign of the Franks' Kings Clovis I, Charles Martel, Pepin the Short, and Charlemagne, the country was known as Kingdom of Franks or Francia. At the Treaty of Verdun in 843, the Frankish Empire was divided in three parts : West Francia (Francia Occidentalis), Middle Francia and East Francia (Francia Orientalis).

The rulers of Francia Orientalis, who soon claimed the imperial title and wanted to reunify the Frankish Empire, dropped the name Francia Orientalis and called their realm the Holy Roman Empire (see History of Germany). The kings of Francia Occidentalis successfully opposed this claim and managed to preserve Francia Occidentalis as an independent kingdom, distinct from the Holy Roman Empire. The Battle of Bouvines in 1214 definitively marked the end of the efforts by the Holy Roman Empire to reunify the old Frankish Empire by conquering France.

Since the name Francia Orientalis had disappeared, there arose the habit to refer to Francia Occidentalis as Francia only, from which the word France is derived. The French state has been in continuous existence since 843 (except for a brief interruption in 885–887), with an unbroken line of heads of states since the first king of Francia Occidentalis (Charles the Bald) to the current president of the French Republic (Emmanuel Macron). Noticeably, in German, France is still called Frankreich, which literally means "Reich (realm) of the Franks". In order to distinguish it from the Frankish Empire of Charlemagne, France is called Frankreich, while the Frankish Empire is called Frankenreich.

Writing in 2009, Professor Christopher Wickham pointed out that "the word 'Frankish' quickly ceased to have an exclusive ethnic connotation. North of the Loire everyone seems to have been considered a Frank by the mid-seventh century at the latest; Romani were essentially the inhabitants of Aquitaine after that". On the other hand, the formulary of Marculf written about AD 700 described a continuation of national identities within a mixed population when it stated that "all the peoples who dwell [in the official's province], Franks, Romans, Burgundians, and those of other nations, live ... according to their law and their custom."

=== France ===
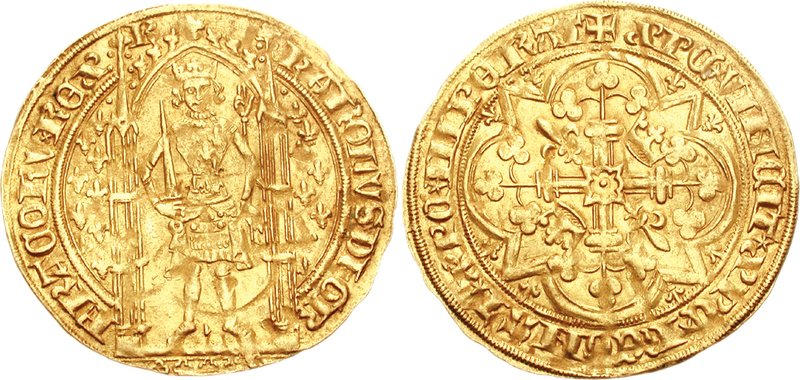
French franc coin of Charles V, with inscription Francorum Rex ('King of the Franks')

The country name France stems from the Latin Francia (the land of the Franks). Its adjective French (Modern French Français; from Old French franceis) is now used to designate the French people and language. Between the reigns of John II of France (1360) and Henri IV (1589–1610), then from the French Convention of 1795 to the adoption of the euro (1999), the franc also served as the currency of France. The term, which may be derived from Francorum Rex ('king of the Franks'), the original motto engraved on coins by the French monarchy, survives today in the name of the Swiss franc, the CFA franc (Western Africa), and the CFP franc (French Pacific).

In most of the modern Germanic languages, France is known as the historical "Land of the Franks", for example Frankreich (Reich of the Franks) in German, Frankrijk (Rijk of the Franks) in Dutch, Frankrike (Rike of the Franks) in Swedish and Norwegian, and Frankrig in Danish.

In a more restricted meaning, "France" refers specifically to the province of Île-de-France (with Paris at its centre), which historically was the heart of the royal demesne. This meaning is found in some geographic names, such as French Brie (Brie française) and French Vexin (Vexin français). French Brie, the area where the Brie cheese is produced, is the part of Brie that was annexed to the royal demesne, as opposed to Champagne Brie (Brie champenoise) which was annexed by Champagne. Likewise, French Vexin is the part of Vexin inside the région Île-de-France, as opposed to Norman Vexin (Vexin normand) which is in the neighbouring part of the région Normandie.

This meaning is also found in the name of the French language (langue française), whose literal meaning is "language of Île-de-France". It is not until the 19th and 20th centuries that the language of Île-de-France indeed became the language of the whole country France. In modern French, the French language is called [le] français, while the old language of Île-de-France is called by the name applied to it according to a 19th-century theory on the origin of the French language - [le] francien., but now Central French (français central).

=== Franconia ===
Franconia became the Latin name of East Francia, derived from the German name Franken "realm of the Franks".

Franconia was introduced as a synonym of Francia orientalis by the 12th century (Annalista Saxo). It came to be used of the Duchy of Franconia as it stood during the 9th and 10th centuries, divided Franconia during the later medieval period, and the Franconian Circle of the early modern period.

== Later uses ==
=== Crusades and later uses in the Levant ===
In the eastern Mediterranean during the Crusades, the term Franks served as an all-inclusive designation for all Western Europeans, applied not only to the crusaders themselves but also for their descendants, who formed the ruling population.

By the 17th century in the Levant, Frank had developed into a broader ethnonym referring to any individual from Western Europe, and by extension to the lingua franca, the Romance-based pidgin language employed throughout the Mediterranean Bassin. The Mediterranean Lingua Franca (or "Frankish language"), a contact pidgin first spoken by 11th century European Christians and Muslims in Mediterranean ports, remained in use until the turn of the 19th century.

The term Frank was employed by many of the Eastern Orthodox and Muslim neighbours of medieval Latin Christendom (along with communities further afield in Asia) as a general designation for people from Western and Central Europe, that is, from regions adhering to the Latin rites of Christianity under papal authority. A related designation in similar contexts was Latins.

In the eastern Mediterranean, Christians following the Latin rites were referred to as Franks or Latins, irrespective of their specific place of origin, whereas Orthodox Christians were known as Rhomaios or Rûmi ('Romans'). On several Greek islands, Catholics continue to be called Frangoi (Φράγκοι; meaning 'Franks'). For example, on Syros they are known as Frangosyrianoi (Φραγκοσυριανοί). The period of Crusader rule over Greek territories is still referred to as the Frankokratia ('rule of the Franks').

The term Frangistan ('Land of the Franks') was used in Muslim sources to denote Christian Europe and circulated widely for centuries in Iberia, North Africa, and the Middle East. Persianate Turkic dynasties further disseminated the term across Iran and India, where it became integrated into local usage. During the Mongol Empire in the 13th and 14th centuries, the Mongols likewise applied the name Franks to Europeans, a usage that persisted in Mughal India in the form firangi.

In contemporary Israel, the Yiddish word פרענק (Frenk), by a curious etymological development, has come to refer to Mizrahi Jews in Modern Hebrew and carries a strongly pejorative connotation.

=== Eastern Asia ===
The Chinese called the Portuguese Folangji 佛郎機 ("Franks") in the 1520s at the Battle of Tunmen and Battle of Xicaowan. Some other varieties of Mandarin Chinese pronounced the characters as Fah-lan-ki.

During the reign of Chingtih (Zhengde) (1506), foreigners from the west called Fah-lan-ki (or Franks), who said they had tribute, abruptly entered the Bogue, and by their tremendously loud guns shook the place far and near. This was reported at court, and an order returned to drive them away immediately, and stop the trade.

— Samuel Wells Williams, The Middle Kingdom: A Survey of the Geography, Government, Education, Social Life, Arts, Religion, &c. of the Chinese Empire and Its Inhabitants, 2 vol. (Wiley & Putnam, 1848).

In the Thai usage, the word can refer to any European person. When the presence of US soldiers during the Vietnam War placed Thai people in contact with African Americans, they (and people of African ancestry in general) came to be called Farang dam ("Black Farang", ฝรั่งดำ). Such words sometimes also connote things, plants or creatures introduced by Europeans/Franks. For example, in Khmer, môn barang, literally "French Chicken", refers to a turkey and in Thai, Farang is the name both for Europeans and for the guava fruit, introduced by Portuguese traders over 400 years ago.

Some linguists (among them Drs. Jan Tent and Paul Geraghty) have suggested that the Samoan and generic Polynesian term for Europeans, Palagi (pronounced Puh-LANG-ee) or Papalagi, might also be cognate, possibly a loan term gathered by early contact between Pacific islanders and Malays.

Examples of derived words include:

- Frangos (Φράγκος) in Greek
- Frëng in Albanian
- Frenk in Turkish
- Firəng in Azerbaijani (derived from Persian)
- al-Faranj, Afranj and Firinjīyah in Arabic
- Farang (فرنگ), Farangī (فرنگی) in Persian, also the toponym Frangistan (فرنگستان)
- Faranji in Tajik, a variety of Persian
- Ferengi or Faranji in some Turkic languages
- Ferenj (ፈረንጅ) in Amharic in Ethiopia, Farangi (ፋራንጂ) in Tigrinya, and similar in other languages of the Horn of Africa, refers to white people with European ancestry
- Feringhi or Firang in Hindi and Urdu (derived from Persian)
- Phirangee in some other Indian languages
- Parangiar in Tamil
- Parangi in Malayalam; in Sinhala, the word refers specifically to Portuguese people
- Bayingyi (ဘရင်ဂျီ) in Burmese
- Barang in Khmer
- Feringgi in Malay
- Folangji or Fah-lan-ki (佛郎機) and Fulang in Chinese
- Farang (ฝรั่ง) in Thai.
- Pirang ("blonde"), Perangai ("temperament/al") in Bahasa Indonesia

== See also ==
- Name of the Goths
