= Totok =

Indonesian term for immigrants

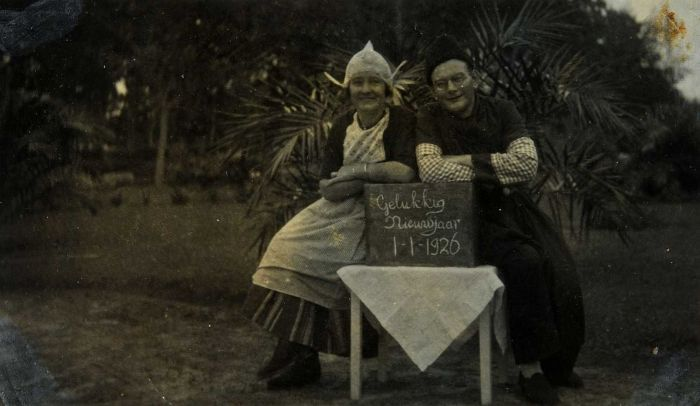
Dutch Totok couple wearing Dutch traditional clothing on New Year's Day 1926

Totok is an Indonesian term of Javanese origin, used in Indonesia to refer to recent migrants of Arab, Chinese, or European origins. In the eighteenth and nineteenth centuries it was popularised among colonists in Batavia, who initially coined the term to describe the foreign born and new immigrants of "pure blood" – as opposed to people of mixed indigenous and foreign descent, such as the Peranakan Arabs, Chinese or Europeans (the latter being better known as the Indo people).

When more pure-blooded Arabs, Chinese and Dutchmen were born in the East Indies, the term gained significance in describing those of exclusive or almost exclusive foreign ancestry.

'Peranakan' is the antonym of 'Totok', the former meaning simply 'descendants' (of mixed roots), and the latter meaning 'pure'.

Chinese were divided into Thanh people (like Totok) and Minh Huong (mixed Chinese Vietnamese like Peranakan) in 1829 by Emperor Minh Mang of the Nguyen dynasty.

== Notable Dutch Totoks and descendants ==
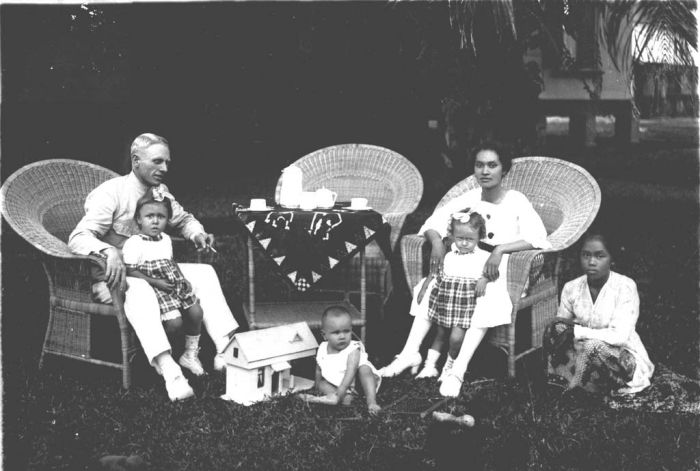
Totok father with Indo wife and children and Indigenous nanny

- Paul Acket (Semarang, Java, 1922), founder of the North Sea Jazz festival
- Albert Alberts (1911–1995), award-winning author, journalist
- Beb Bakhuys (1909–1982), football player and manager
- Ben Bot (born in Batavia) (b. 1937), minister
- Hans van den Broek (b. 1936), minister
- Jeroen Brouwers (1940–2022), author
- Conrad Busken Huet (1826–1886), newspaper editor on Java (1868–1876)
- Louis Couperus (1863–1923), childhood in Batavia, Java (1871–1877), author of The Hidden Force (1900)
- P. A. Daum (1850–1898), newspaperman, author
- Johan Fabricius (1899–1981), author of De Scheepsjongens van Bontekoe (1923)
- Anthony Fokker (Blitar, Java, 1890–1939), aviation pioneer
- Hella Haasse (Batavia, Java, 1918–2011), award-winning author
- Erik Hazelhoff Roelfzema (Surabaya, Java, 1917–2007), decorated World War II hero
- W. R. van Hoëvell (1812–1879), church minister of Batavia, political activist (1838–1848)
- Xaviera Hollander (b. 1943), author
- Conrad Helfrich (1886–1962), lieutenant-admiral of the Royal Netherlands Navy
- Rudy Kousbroek (1929–2010), author
- Liesbeth List (b. 1941), singer
- Multatuli (1820–1887), resident on Ambon and Java (1838–1858), iconic author
- Willem Nijholt, artist, singer
- Willem Oltmans (1925–2004), journalist, author
- Helga Ruebsamen (1934–2016), author
- F. Springer (1932–2011), author
- Bram van der Stok (Plaju, Sumatra, 1915–1993), decorated World War II hero
- Madelon Szekely-Lulofs (Surabaya, 1899–1958) author of Rubber(1931) and Koelie (1931)
- Peter Tazelaar (Bukittingi, Sumatra, 1922–1993), decorated World War II hero
- Edgar Vos (Makassar, 1931–2010), fashion designer
- Margaretha Geertruida Zelle (1876–1917), known as Mata Hari, exotic dancer, spy

== See also ==
- Afrikaner
- Ang mo
- Barang
- Bule (term)
- Farang
- Indo people
- Indos in colonial history
- Indos in pre-colonial history
- Mat Salleh
- Peninsulares
