= Laubscher =

Laubscher is a surname. Notable people with the surname include:

- H.P. Laubscher (1916–2008), South African army officer
- Japie Laubscher (1919–1981), South African musician
- Julien Laubscher (born 1987), South African pop artist
- Rick Laubscher (born 1949), American businessman and journalist
