= Gaijin =

Japanese word for "foreigner"

Gaijin (外人; [ɡai(d)ʑiɴ]; 'outsider, alien') is a Japanese word for foreigners and non-Japanese citizens in Japan, specifically being applied to foreigners of non-Japanese ethnicity and those from the Japanese diaspora who are not Japanese citizens. The word is composed of two kanji: gai (外, 'outside') and jin (人, 'person'). Similarly composed words that refer to foreign things include gaikoku (外国, 'foreign country') and gaisha (外車, 'foreign car'). Though the term can be applied to all foreigners of non-Japanese citizenship and ethnicity, some non-Japanese East Asians may have specific terminology used instead. (Note: Attributed to multiple sources:)

Some feel the word has come to have a negative or pejorative connotation, (Note: Attributed to multiple sources:) while other observers maintain it is neutral. Gaikokujin (外国人; [ɡaikokɯꜜ(d)ʑiɴ]; 'foreign-country person') is a more neutral and somewhat more formal term widely used in the Japanese government and in media. Gaijin does not specifically mean a foreigner that is also a white person; instead, the term hakujin (白人 'white person') can be considered as a type of foreigner, and kokujin (黒人 'black person') would be the black equivalent.

== Etymology and history ==
The word gaijin can be traced in writing to the 13th-century Heike Monogatari:

外人もなき所に兵具をとゝのへ
Assembling arms where there are no gaijin (Note: The 13th-century pronunciation of the characters 外人 is debated; it may have been kotobito (ことびと), udokihito (うどきひと) or gwaijin (ぐゎいじん). The spelling gaijin is used here for continuity.)

Here, gaijin refers to outsiders and potential enemies. Another early reference is in Renri Hishō (c. 1349) by Nijō Yoshimoto, where it is used to refer to a Japanese person who is a stranger, not a friend. The Noh play, Kurama tengu has a scene where a servant objects to the appearance of a traveling monk:

源平両家の童形たちのおのおのござ候ふに、かやうの外人は然るべからず候
A gaijin doesn't belong here, where children from the Genji and Heike families are playing.

Here, gaijin also means an outsider or unfamiliar person.

The Portuguese in the 16th century were the first Europeans to visit Japan; they were called nanbanjin ('southern barbarians'), and trade with them was known as the Nanban trade. When British and Dutch adventurers such as William Adams arrived in the early 17th century, they were usually known as kōmōjin ('red-haired people'), a term cognate to one used in modern Hokkien Chinese.

When the Tokugawa shogunate was made to open Japan to foreign contact after two centuries of self-isolation, Westerners were commonly called as ijin ('different people'), a shortened form of ikokujin ('different country person') or ihōjin ('different motherland people').

The word gaikokujin (外国人) is composed of gaikoku ('foreign country') and jin ('person'). Early citations exist from c. 1235, but it was largely non-extant until reappearing in 1838. The Meiji government (1868–1912) further popularized the term, which came to replace ijin, ikokujin and ihōjin. As the Empire of Japan extended to Korea and to Taiwan, the term naikokujin ('within-country people') came to refer to nationals of other imperial territories. While other terms fell out of use after World War II, gaikokujin remained the official term for non-Japanese people. Some hold that the modern gaijin is a contraction of gaikokujin.

== Usage ==
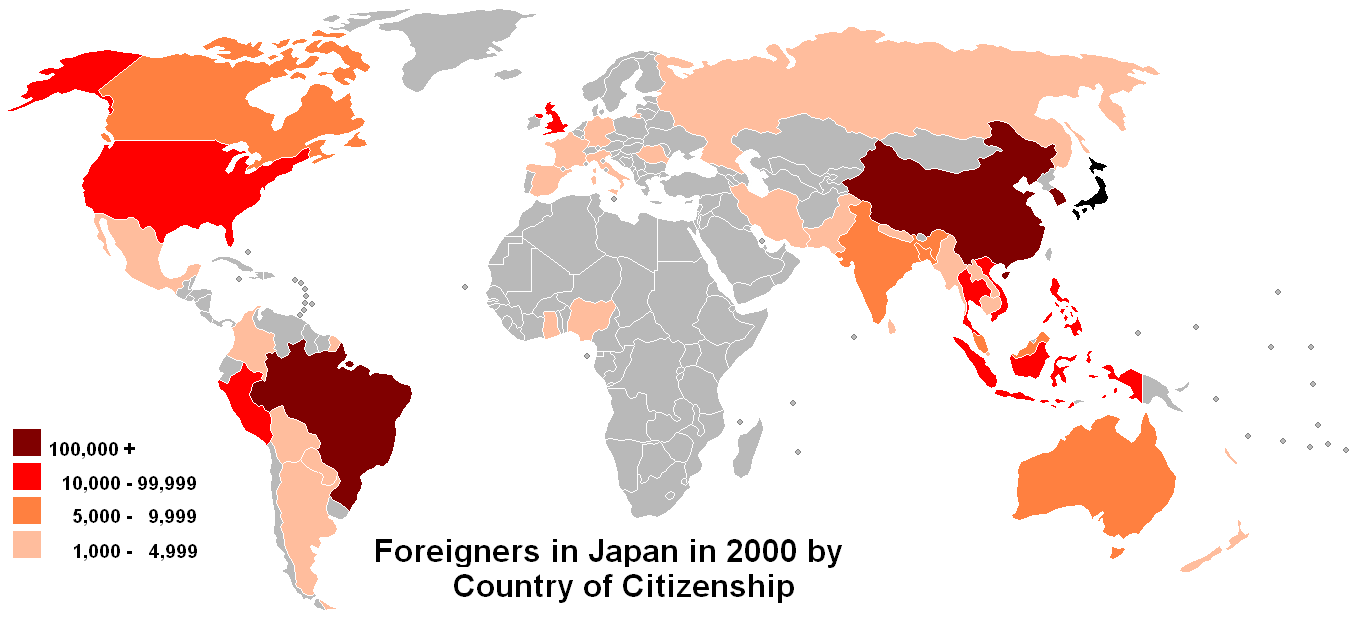
Foreigners in Japan in 2000 by citizenship

While all forms of the word mean 'foreigner' or 'outsider', in practice gaijin and gaikokujin are commonly used to refer to foreigners of non-East Asian ethnicities. (Note: Attributed to multiple sources:) For example, other East Asians such as ethnic Chinese and Koreans residing in Japan are not referred to as gaijin, but by their nationality directly. Special permanent residents with ancestry from Japan's wartime colonies, mostly Koreans, are known as zainichi (在日), while for ethnic Chinese specifically kakyō (華僑) is also used.

The term may also sometimes be applied to Wajin born and raised in other countries. Gaijin is also commonly used within Japanese events such as baseball (there is a limit to non-Japanese players in NPB) and professional wrestling to collectively refer to the visiting performers from the West who will frequently tour the country.

Japanese speakers commonly refer to non-Japanese people as gaijin even while they are overseas. Also, people of Japanese descent native to other countries (especially those countries with large Japanese communities) might also call non-descendants gaijin, as a counterpart to nikkei. This interpretation of the term as neutral in tone continues for some. However, though the term may be used without negative intent by many Japanese speakers, it is seen as derogatory by some and reflective of exclusionary attitudes. (Note: Attributed to multiple sources:)

While the term itself has no derogatory meaning, it emphasizes the exclusiveness of Japanese attitude and has therefore picked up pejorative connotations that many Westerners resent.

— Mayumi Itoh (1995)

In light of these connotations, the more neutral and formal gaikokujin is often used as an alternative term to refer to non-Japanese people. Nanette Gottlieb, Professor of Japanese Studies at the School of Languages and Comparative Cultural Studies at the University of Queensland, suggests that the term has become controversial and is avoided now by most Japanese television broadcasters.

Gaijin appears frequently in Western literature and pop culture. It forms the title of such novels as Marc Olden's Gaijin (New York: Arbor House, 1986), James Melville's Go gently, gaijin (New York : St. Martin's Press, 1986), James Kirkup's Gaijin on the Ginza (London: Chester Springs, 1991) and James Clavell's Gai-Jin (New York: Delacorte Press, 1993), as well as a song by Nick Lowe. It is the title of feature films such as Tizuka Yamazaki's Gaijin – Os Caminhos da Liberdade (1980) and Gaijin – Ama-me Como Sou (2005), as well as animation shorts such as Fumi Inoue's Gaijin (2003).

== See also ==
- List of terms for ethnic exogroups
- Alien (law)
- Bule
- Farang
- Guizi
- Goyim
- Gweilo
- Gringo
- Japanese abbreviated and contracted words
- Laowai
- Pendatang
- Sangokujin
- Sonnō jōi
