= Colorism in Indonesia =

Prejudice and discrimination based on skin colour in Indonesian society

Colorism in Indonesia refers to prejudice and discrimination based on skin colour within Indonesian society, in which lighter skin is widely regarded as more attractive and higher in social status than darker skin. Scholars trace the preference to a combination of influences, including pre-colonial literary and religious traditions, the racial hierarchy imposed under Dutch colonial rule, the Japanese occupation, and the spread of American popular culture after independence. In contemporary Indonesia, the preference for lighter skin is reflected in the country's large skin-whitening cosmetics market, in casting practices in advertising and television, and in discrimination faced by dark-skinned Indonesians, particularly Papuans.

The most extensive academic treatment of the subject is Seeing Beauty, Sensing Race in Transnational Indonesia (2013) by L. Ayu Saraswati, a professor of women's studies at the University of Hawaii, published by University of Hawaii Press and translated into Indonesian as Putih: Warna Kulit, Ras, dan Kecantikan di Indonesia Transnasional (2017).

== Historical background ==
=== Pre-colonial and early influences ===
Saraswati argues that the association between light skin and beauty in Indonesia predates European colonialism, tracing it to the Javanese Ramayana epic, adapted from the Indian original by the ninth century, in which fair-skinned characters are described favourably.

=== Dutch colonial period ===
Under Dutch colonial rule, the population of the Dutch East Indies was divided by law into three legal classes: Europeans, "Foreign Orientals" (mainly ethnic Chinese and Arabs), and "Natives". Europeans occupied the top positions in colonial companies, the army, and the government. Saraswati writes that beauty ideals acquired an explicitly racial dimension in this period, as light skin became identified with the Caucasian, European elite.

=== Japanese occupation and post-independence periods ===
According to Saraswati, the Japanese occupation during World War II introduced a new, regionally-inflected beauty ideal centred on East Asian, rather than European, light skin, while the post-colonial period saw a growing association between light skin and a distinctly national "Indonesian" identity, and later, in the era of globalisation, an ideal of light skin detached from any single national or racial origin.

== Contemporary manifestations ==
=== Cosmetics industry ===
Skin-whitening products are consistently among Indonesia's best-selling cosmetics. Saraswati's analysis of advertising for such products finds that "putih" (white) is persistently paired with positive connotations such as brightness, hope, and purity, while darker skin is associated with negative qualities.

=== Media and advertising ===
Light-skinned actors and presenters make up a large share of the faces seen on Indonesian television and in advertising. Modelling agencies in Jakarta specialising in white or Western-looking talent supply foreign faces for product and brand campaigns.

=== Discrimination against Papuans and dark-skinned Indonesians ===
Papuans, whose Melanesian ancestry gives many darker skin and curlier hair than most other Indonesian ethnic groups, are frequently subject to racist remarks and discrimination elsewhere in the country. In August 2019, a group of Papuan students in Surabaya were subjected to racist abuse and a police raid on their dormitory after a rumour that they had damaged an Indonesian flag, an incident that set off protests across Papua later that month. Following the killing of George Floyd in the United States in May 2020, Indonesian commentators and activists drew comparisons between the Black Lives Matter movement and the treatment of Papuans, under hashtags including #PapuanLivesMatter. The Papuan vlogger Barneci Nuboba started an Instagram campaign, #talingkarclub ("curly hair club" in the Papuan dialect), encouraging young Papuan women to embrace their natural hair rather than straighten it to fit mainstream Indonesian beauty norms.

=== Foreigners and bule status ===
The preference for light skin also shapes how white foreigners, known in Indonesian as bule, are treated in everyday life. The anthropologist Anne-Meike Fechter writes that white expatriates in Indonesia often benefit from a form of social deference rooted in the same colonial-era hierarchy that underlies domestic colorism, though she notes this privilege is shaped by nationality, wealth, and profession as well as skin colour, and is not experienced in the same way by Black or non-white foreigners. In her ethnographic study of an international school in Jakarta, the anthropologist Danau Tanu documents how students were informally grouped along racial and national lines, with "white" identity, not always defined strictly by skin colour, conferring greater social status.

== Reception of Saraswati's work ==
Seeing Beauty, Sensing Race in Transnational Indonesia and its Indonesian translation have been reviewed in Indonesian media outlets including Konde.co and VOI, which described the book as tracing how Indonesia's beauty standards perpetuate a preference for light skin rooted in both colonial and pre-colonial history.

== See also ==
- Bule (term)
- Colorism
- Skin whitening
- Dutch East Indies
- Indo people
- Western New Guinea
- Black Lives Matter
