= Japie =

Japie is a South African male first name, of Afrikaans origin, often found as a familiar or shortened form of the names Johannes and Jacobus.

The name may be occasionally used as an ethnic slur for Afrikaners, in which instance it is also spelt according to English orthography: yarpie. This comes from the Afrikaans term plaasjapie, meaning "farm boy". It may or may not be an offensive term depending upon intent and context of use.

The name Japie may refer to:

== People ==
- Japie Laubscher (1919–1981), South African musician
- Japie Louw (1867–1936), South African rugby player
- Japie Motale (born 1979), South African football player
- Japie Mulder (born 1969), South African rugby player
- Japie Nel (born 1982), South African rugby player

== See also ==
- Jacobus (name)
- Johannes
