= Bog-trotter =

Bog-trotter may refer to:

- A derogatory term for some types of Irishmen
- Bruce Bogtrotter, a character in the Matilda franchise
- Bogtrotter: An Autobiography with Lyrics, a 1980 book by Dory Previn
- The 1991 winner of the Greenham Stakes
- A folk name for the Eurasian bittern
- In UK Parliamentary slang, a party's parliamentary whip whose job was, at a parliamentary division, to quickly check round the Parliament building's toilets to check if any of his party's members were in there, as a few members missing at a vote may lose the vote, if the vote is close.
