= Laowai =

Informal Chinese term for "foreigner"

Laowai is the Pinyin pronunciation/transliteration of 老外 (pinyin: lǎowài, lit. "old foreign"), an informal term or slang for "foreigner" and/or non-Chinese national, usually neutral but possibly impolite or loose in some circumstances. Formal and polite Chinese terms for foreigner include wàiguórén (simplified Chinese: 外国人; traditional Chinese: 外國人; lit. 'foreigner'), wàibīn (外宾; 外賓; 'foreigner guest'), guójì yǒurén (国际友人; 國際友人; 'international friend') and wàiguó péngyoǔ (外國朋友; 外国朋友; 'foreigner friend'). Laowai is commonly used to refer to foreigners of non-East Asian ethnicities, primarily White, Black, and Brown people. The term usually does not refer to ethnic Han of non-Chinese citizenship or other Asian ethnicities.

== Etymology ==
The use of the word 老外 began in the 1980s, likely as an abbreviation of the term 外國人 (foreigner) into 外 plus the prefix 老.

As characters and words, 老 lǎo means "old; senior; aged"; 外 wài means "out; outside; external; outer", and by extension various meanings including "appearance; faraway; distant; non-local; foreign; informal; other; unorthodox".

老 is a common colloquial prefix of respect (partly out of the value of seniority conferred), its use dating back to some of the earliest Mandarin vernacular records. In Mandarin, the prefix is well-established enough that it is now inseparably fixed in many words, where its original meaning is lost. For example, 老师; 老師 lǎoshī "teacher" is composed of 老 lǎo and 师; 師 shī "teacher", and the original word for "teacher" 师; 師 shī cannot be used alone. Other examples include 老天爷; 老天爺 lǎotiānyé "(Lord of) Heavens", 老乡; 老鄉 lǎoxiāng "fellow townspeople", 老虎 lǎohǔ "tiger", and even 老鼠 lǎoshǔ "mouse". The prefix has undergone semantic broadening, and can be found modifying positive, negative, and neutrally charged terms.

In its active use, the prefix 老 lǎo is most often added to surnames to show respect in informal registers towards anyone not definitively young. This is often contrasted with another prefix 小 xiǎo "small; little; young", which, added to surnames, shows closeness and friendly affection in informal registers towards anyone more junior and at least slightly younger than the speaker. Another much less common and rather restricted use is attaching 老 to a descriptor to mark such a person, with a slightly humorous undertone. For example, 老顽固; 老頑固 lǎowángù "a stubborn one" is composed of 顽固; 頑固 wángù "stubborn".

The associations of the prefix 老 can be positive, indicating age or experience—such as lǎopéngyou (老朋友; 'old friend')—or respect, as in the familiar use of lǎo to denote the senior and respected members of families or to address teachers (老师; 老師, lǎoshī). It may also be used in combination with part of a person's name (usually the family name) to refer to that person familiarly and respectfully (for example, a person with the surname 周, or Zhōu, could be referred to as 老周, literally "Old Zhōu"). This usage is usually reserved for adults, but implies familiarity rather than seniority, and is often attached to specific individuals as a nickname rather than being freely used.

However, in certain restricted contexts, it can also carry negative connotations of being old or aged-looking (老头子; 老頭子), boring old sticks-in-the-mud—as in lǎo gǔdǒng (Chinese: 老古董)—or of years of experience and contempt—as in lǎo dōngxi (老东西; 老東西; 'old bastard', lit. "old thing"). It may be used in the arts or in jokes with the sense of "always" or "very": a famous comedy role was named the Lǎoniān (老蔫, "Constantly Listless"). As a pun with lǎoshī "teacher", 老师; 老師, Tom Hardy was affectionately known in mainland China as Lǎoshī (Chinese: 老濕; s 老湿; Constantly Wet) partly for his perpetually shiny hair.

The character has come to be used for specific nationalities as well, with lǎo- functioning as a colloquial equivalent for -guórén: lǎoměi (老美; 'American'), lǎomò (老墨; 'Mexican'); even lǎozhōng (老中) to refer to Chinese (中國人; 中国人; Zhōngguórén) themselves. The alarm clock emoji ⏰ (nàozhōng) is also used as a humorous punning variant of "lǎozhōng" on youth platforms.

== Informality of the term ==
The term is not considered necessarily offensive by those who choose to use it, but it may become so from context (tone, manner, situation, etc.). Among the Chinese, the term is informal and may be used in a neutral, genial, or even good-humored way. Varying, it is ironically embraced, begrudgingly accepted, openly resented, or not minded at all among the Western expatriate community.

The official Chinese press has expressed concern about inappropriate use of laowai and avoids it in all formal reporting. (Note: Although note its use in such informal human-interest stories as this photo caption from the Chinese edition of Anhui News.)

Mark Rowswell, known under the stage name Dashan, is one of the most famous Western nationals in China's media industry and has admitted a place for the term. However, he recognizes it as pejorative and stated that "it is the foreigners [in China] who can't speak any Chinese who are truly 'laowai'" (不會說漢語的外國人那纔叫老外呢; 不会说汉语的外国人那才叫老外呢).

Editorials, written by Chinese and non-Chinese, have appeared in English- and Chinese-language newspapers about the subject, particularly around the time of the 2008 Summer Olympics in Beijing.

== See also ==
- Ang Mo ("redhead" in Hokkien/Min Nan/Teochew)
- China Hands
- Gaijin ("outsider" in Japanese)
- Gweilo ("ghoulie" in Cantonese)
- Permanent Foreigners
