= Japie Motale =

South African soccer player

Personal information
- Date of birth: 1 January 1979 (age 47)
- Place of birth: Pretoria, South Africa
- Height: 1.75 m (5 ft 9 in)
- Position: Defender

Senior career*
Years	Team	Apps	(Gls)
1997–1998	Mamelodi Sundowns	1	(0)
1998–2003	Supersport United	138	(4)
2003	Moroka Swallows	3	(0)
2003–2004	Black Leopards	16	(0)
2004–2007	Maritzburg United	55	(1)
2007–2010	Thanda Royal Zulu	34	(0)

International career
2002	South Africa	2	(0)
- * Club domestic league appearances and goals as of 17:09, 21 October 2013 (UTC)

Japie Motale born 1 January 1979) is a South African former professional soccer player, who played as a defender.
