= Huan-a =

Hokkien term

- Hàn-jī: 番仔
- Pe̍h-ōe-jī: Hoan-á
- Tâi-lô: Huan-á

Huan-a (Chinese: 番仔; Pe̍h-ōe-jī: hoan-á) is a Hokkien-language term used by Hokkien speakers in multiple countries, namely Mainland China, Taiwan, Singapore, Malaysia, Philippines, Indonesia, etc. The word itself when dissected means 番; hoan; 'foreign', + 仔; á; 'diminutive noun suffix', but to the ethnic Chinese that settled overseas in Taiwan and Maritime Southeast Asia, it soon came to refer to native Southeast Asians and Taiwanese aborigines.

== Etymology ==
The Hokkien word itself when dissected means, 番; hoan; 'foreign', + 仔; á; 'diminutive noun suffix', resulting in Hokkien Chinese: 番仔; Pe̍h-ōe-jī: Hoan-á; lit. 'foreigner', originally from the perspective of ethnic Chinese referring to non-Chinese people, especially historically natives of Taiwan and Southeast Asia. In Taiwan, the aboriginal group Hoanya retains an older form of the word, where the second syllable retained the obsolete diminutive suffix, 仔; (iá), in Hokkien, which originally came from a weak form of 囝; (kiáⁿ, káⁿ) and today survives in Hokkien as the diminutive suffix, 仔; (á). "番仔; Huán-nià" is attested in the Dictionario Hispanico Sinicum (1626–1642) and use of the obsolete 仔; (iá) suffix is also recorded in Medhurst (1832).

Over the centuries, it also varyingly took on derogatory connotations depending on how each Hokkien-speaking community perceived non-Chinese or natives, such as the derogatory taboo status of the term in Taiwan in reference to Taiwanese aboriginal groups in general or to any unreasonable persons, although the word has varying connotations in other Hokkien-speaking communities, such as in Fujian (mainland China), the Philippines, Malaysia, Singapore, and Indonesia.

== Mainland China ==
Hokkien speakers in mainland China, specifically in Southern Fujian, such as in Amoy (Xiamen), Chuanchiu (Quanzhou), and Chiangchiu (Zhangzhou), use this term to refer to a foreigner or a westerner, especially those from Europe or the Americas.

== Taiwan ==
Taiwanese Hokkien and Taiwanese Hakka speakers, as well as non-Chinese speakers in Taiwan, may perceive this term as derogatory owing to historical negative views towards the demographic minority non-Chinese in Taiwan, such as towards the ethnic Taiwanese aboriginals and the ethnic Japanese during imperial Japanese rule over Taiwan.

Huan-á (番仔) is what Taiwanese Hokkien speakers use to refer to the Taiwanese aborigines, but it colloquially took on negative connotations as it was historically used as an ethnic slur when perceived and translated as "barbarian" and may sometimes derogatorily be used to refer to an "unreasonable person". It may also be the origin of the name of the Hoanya people, the Taiwanese aborigines of southwestern Taiwan.

During the Japanese colonial period of Taiwan, the Japanese were also called hoan-á by Han Taiwanese, with geisha called hoan-á-ke (番仔雞, lit. "foreign chicken") and the wives of Japanese men called hoan-á-chiú-kan (番仔酒矸, lit. "foreign liquor bottle").

Historically in Taiwanese Hokkien, like their mainland counterparts, it was and still sometimes is meant to mean a foreigner or a westerner, especially that of the Caucasian race group, otherwise referred to as ang mo in other Hokkien-speaking regions.

=== Incidents ===
In November 2016, while meeting as a member of the legislature's economics committee, Legislative Yuan member Chiu Yi-ying was overheard exclaiming this slur to refer to Kuomintang aboriginal representatives; she later apologized.

In 2019, Yang Meiling, an indigenous Taiwanese tour guide in Jialan, Taitung, used this term several times while leading a group of tourists visiting the Sky Trail (天空步道); she also called the locals "a lost tribe" (失落的部落).

In 2023, a Taichung Municipal Taichung First Senior High School student stirred controversy by naming a fair booth with the Mandarin phrase for sodium cyclopentadienide (Mandarin Chinese: 烯環鈉; pinyin: xīhuánnà; IPA: /ɕi˥ xu̯än˧˥ nä˥˩/), its pronunciation being homophonous to a Taiwanese Hokkien swear word meaning "dead aborigine" (Hokkien Chinese: 死番仔; Pe̍h-ōe-jī: sí hoan-á; IPA: /ɕi˥˧ huan˧ a˥˧/). The school later apologized.

== Southeast Asia ==
=== Indonesia ===
Hokkien-speaking Chinese Indonesians use the term to refer to people descended from the many ethnic groups of Indonesia, otherwise known as pribumi (Indonesian and English) or inlanders (Dutch and English), for example the Javanese, Sundanese, Buginese, Batak, and Riau Malays. A more offensive term also used locally is Indonesian: tiko (simplified Chinese: 猪哥; traditional Chinese: 豬哥; Pe̍h-ōe-jī: ti-ko).

=== Malaysia and Singapore ===
Hokkien-speaking Chinese Malaysians and Chinese Singaporeans also use huan-a to neutrally refer to ethnic Malays and other indigenous groups, such as those classified as Bumiputra. It is also sometimes used to refer to the Malay language in Penang and Singaporean Hokkien. At the same time, Europeans are called ang moh (紅毛) while Tamils and other South Asians are called keling-á (吉零仔).

=== Philippines ===
Hokkien speakers among Chinese Filipinos in the Philippines use the term to plainly refer to native Filipinos or any non-ethnic-Chinese Filipino when the speaker is not familiar with their ancestry, such as Filipino mestizos. It is sometimes considered as vulgar by some speakers as well, but it depends on the speaker's perceptions and culture on how they grew up to learn to perceive the term, since non-ethnic-Chinese are the demographic majority in the Philippines and Chinese Filipinos do not have recent historical negative conflict with other Philippine ethnic groups. The usage of the term is mostly used either neutrally or condescendingly to refer to any non-Chinese Filipinos, especially native Filipinos, based on context depending on the speaker's intentions, whether positively, neutrally, or negatively. It was first attested in the Dictionario Hispanico Sinicum (1626–1642) as "Yndio 番仔; Huán-nià", where Yndio is the Spanish-colonial-era form of Spanish: indio which historically referred to natives of the East Indies, such as Austronesian and Negrito groups in the Philippines.

The Kaisa Para Sa Kaunlaran organization that runs Bahay Tsinoy, an Intramuros-based museum dedicated to Chinese Filipino heritage and history, discourages the use of Huan-á, which they define as referring to someone as "barbaric" and consider to be widespread among Chinese Filipinos due to a "force of habit", although in reality, the negative meaning was influenced from Taiwan's taboo perceptions, such as subtitle translations from watching Taiwanese TV dramas by some Chinese Filipinos. To avoid negative connotations, the Kaisa organization recommend using "Chinese: 菲律宾人; Pe̍h-ōe-jī: Hui-li̍p-pin-lâng; lit. 'Filipino'" instead when referring to native Filipinos, which itself is problematic as Chinese Filipinos are also legally Filipinos under the Philippine nationality law.

Similar terms to huan-á in Philippine Hokkien also include 上番 (siōng-hoan; well-to-do native Filipino) and 臭番 (chhàu-hoan;unrefined native Filipino).

== In other Chinese languages ==
There are several terms with the same meaning as huan-á in other Chinese languages such as Hakka, Teochew, Cantonese, and Mandarin. One of those is the word 番鬼 (pinyin: fānguǐ, Jyutping: faan^{1} gwai^{2}, Hakka GR: fan^{1} gui^{3}, Teochew Peng'im: huang^{1} gui^{2}; loaned into Indonesian as fankui), meaning "foreign ghost" (鬼 means 'ghost' or 'demon'), which is primarily used by Hakka and Mandarin-speaking mainland Chinese and Chinese Indonesians to refer to non-Chinese people who are considered ill-mannered or rude. Hakka speakers also use fan-ngin (番人) as a less offensive alternative. Thai Teochews use 番囝 (Teochew Peng'im: huang^{1} gian^{2}) to refer to ethnic Thais.

== See also ==
- Indigenous peoples
- Pribumi
- Bumiputera (Malaysia)
