= Frangistan =

Former Persian name for Western Europe

Frangistan (Persian: فرنگستان) was a term used by Easterners and Persians in particular, during the Middle Ages and later historical periods to refer to Western or Latin Europe.

Frangistan literally means "Land of the Franks", from Farang, which is the Persianized form of Frank, plus the suffix -stan coming from the Persian language and meaning "place of", "place abounding in". During the Crusades, Easterners came to call the invading Western (Latin) Christians Franks, originally the name for inhabitants of the largest of the Latin Christian realms in Europe, Francia, which gave its name to the Kingdom of France (although its eastern parts came to be known as the Holy Roman Empire).

This name was in contrast to the name used by Arabs for their longstanding Eastern Christian neighbors (the Greek Orthodox Christians of the Byzantine (Eastern Roman) Empire), who were called "Rumis", named for Rûm (derived from "Rome", i.e. the medieval Eastern Roman Empire with its capital in Constantinople).

As the Franks (French) formed a substantial part of the force of the First Crusade, and Old French became the dominant language in the crusader states of the 12th century (notably the Principality of Antioch), the term Frank as used in the Levant could mean any Western European (Latin) Christian (whether Frankish, Saxon, Flemish, etc.). Frangistan was not a clearly defined area and may have referred to any land perceived to be Western by Easterners.

Conversely, Christians generally called Easterners Saracens or Moors.

The term Frangistan was still in use in the time of the Ottoman Empire, in sources as late as the 17th century. While in Iran, it remained in use until the end of the Qajar era as observed in various correspondences and administrative documents that refer to European countries. Other derivatives of this word such as Farang (noun), Farangi (adjective), and compound words like Farangi Ma'āb (literally 'French-styled'), are used with lower frequency in Modern Persian, and without any negative connotation. In Hindi in present-day India, all Europeans in general are still referred to as Firangi (फ़िरंगी), as are Westerners in Thailand (ฝรั่ง, fá-ràng).

== See also ==
- The Mediterranean Lingua Franca was a pidgin spoken among Europeans ("Franks") and Muslims.
- Franco-Levantines
- Farang, the medieval Persian word for the Franks, which referred to Western Europeans in general
  - Rûm, the Islamic word for Byzantium and the Byzantines, meaning "Rome" or "Romans"
- Frankokratia, the period in the history of Greece after the Fourth Crusade (1204)
