= Bule (term) =

Indonesian word referring to non-Indonesian people, mostly Westerners

Bule (Indonesian: [ˈbule]) is an Indonesian word for people of non-Indonesian descent, especially people of European descent ('white', 'Caucasian').

== Etymology ==
The word is of Old Javanese origin, meaning 'white skin'. The 15th century Javanese manuscript Tantu Pagelaran refers to "kebo bule", or white buffalo. An 1840 book noted that people preferred 'bulei' (white) buffalo to 'hitam' (which is the current Indonesian word for black).

An 1869 Malay-Dutch dictionary notes the words 'balar', 'sabun' and 'andan' as referring to 'white people' (wit mensch) and 'albinos'. An 1894 Malay-English dictionary noted the words 'andan' and 'bulei' as referring to albinos, and 'sabun' (a word in current usage as soap) as an adjective for all-white dogs, and for albinos. The word 'balar' is given as an adjective meaning white in the context of buffalos, and also albinos.

A 1948 Javanese Indonesian dictionary notes boelé, balar and boelai as a suffix to the Javanese 'wong' or 'person', in Indonesian 'orang balar' or 'orang saboen'.

Subsequent dictionaries may define 'bule' simply as albino. However, in current usage the Dutch loanword albino is more commonly used.

== Usage ==
In spoken form, the word may be used by street vendors to attract tourists or foreigners' attention. A more neutral alternative that is popular for attracting potential customers' attention in Indonesia is Mister.

As a word for foreigner, the term can have pejorative intent, and many Westerners in Indonesia find it stereotypical and offensive. The political scientist Benedict Anderson claimed to have invented the use of the word to refer to foreigners, saying that he realized his skin colour was close to that of albino animals, and told people that people like him should therefore be referred to as bule, not putih (the Indonesian word for the colour white). He also (wrongly) claimed that there are no instances in print of the term being used to refer to humans prior to 1963. Bule is used in terms such as bule hunter, which is used with pejorative intent to refer to an Indonesian person who prefers to find a foreign romantic partner.

=== Similar terms ===
Another term with a similar connotation and usage is "Londo", derived from Javanese "Walondo" (Dutch).

== See also ==
- Laowai, in China
- Gaijin, in Japan
- Pendatang and Mat Salleh, in Malaysia
- Ang mo, in Malaysia, Singapore and Taiwan
- Gweilo, in Southern China, Hong Kong and Macau
- Farang, in Thailand
