= Rike =

Rike or Ryke is a given name and a surname. It may refer to:

- Rike Boomgaarden (fl. 2009-present), German singer and songwriter
- Ryke Geerd Hamer (1935–2017), German physician whose license was revoked for originating and practicing a system of pseudo-medicine
- Kjell Kristian Rike (1944–2008), Norwegian sports commentator

== See also ==
- Rike Kumler Co., commonly known as Rike's, a former American department store in Dayton, Ohio
- Reich, spelled rike in Swedish and modern Norwegian, rige in Danish and riik in Estonian; analogous to the English word "realm"
