= Gweilo =

Cantonese term for white people

- Chinese: 鬼佬
- Literal meaning: ghost people
Transcriptions
Standard Mandarin
- Hanyu Pinyin: guǐlǎo
Yue: Cantonese
- Yale Romanization: gwái-lóu
- Jyutping: gwai^{2} lou^{2}
- Canton Romanization: guei^{2} lou^{2}

Gweilo or gwailou (Chinese: 鬼佬; Cantonese Yale: gwáilóu, pronounced [kʷɐ̌i lǒu]) is a common Cantonese slang term for white people. The term can be literally translated as "ghoul man" or "devil man" and has a history of racially deprecatory and pejorative use, though its modern usage is often in a general and non-derogatory context. The appropriateness of the term and whether it constitutes as an offensive ethnic slur are disputed among both Cantonese speakers and Westerners.

== Etymology and history ==
Gwái (鬼, gui in Mandarin) means "ghoul", "ghost" or "devil", and lóu (佬) means "man" or "guy". The literal translation of gwáilóu would thus be "ghoul man" or "ghost man". It is sometimes translated into English as "foreign devil". In many Sinitic languages, 鬼 gwai and its local equivalents can be a derogatory term used as a curse or an insult. The term 鬼 gwai has also been used to describe other ethnic groups, for example, a 17th-century writer from Canton, Qu Dajun, wrote that Africans "look like ghouls", and gwáinòuh (Chinese: 鬼奴; lit. 'ghoul slave') was once used to describe African slaves.

== Usage ==
The term gwái (鬼) is an adjective that can be used to express hate and deprecation, an example being the locals' expression of their hatred towards the Japanese during their occupation of Hong Kong in World War II with the same gwái. It conveys a general bad and negative feeling but is a somewhat obsolete and archaic/old-fashioned term nowadays and other more modern terms have largely replaced gwái for similarly negative meanings. Cantonese people sometimes call each other sēui gwái (衰鬼), which means bad person, though more often than not it is applied affectionately, similar to "Hey, bitch!" in English when used affectionately. Nowadays, Cantonese speakers often refer to non-Chinese people by their ethnicity.

Gwáilóu is often considered to be an acceptable generic racial term for Westerners. Also, some members of the Hong Kong community with European ancestry (particularly those with limited or zero Cantonese fluency) are indifferent to the term, and those who believe that the best way to defang a word intended as a "slur" is to embrace it, and use gweilo to refer to non-Chinese in Hong Kong. Gwailóu has, in some instances, been recognised as simply referring to white foreigners in South East Asia and now appears on Oxford Dictionaries defined as such, although non-white foreigners are not gwáilóu. While gwáilóu is used by some Cantonese speakers in informal speech, another alternative term the sound of which has several meanings sāi yàhn (西人; 'Western person') is now used as well, particularly if the conversation involves a non-Chinese person. Homonyms - ie words that sound the same or almost the same depending on the tone - to sai yan include references to female genitalia or boasting so sai yan is not necessarily a polite alternative to gwai lou. A neutral alternative would be 'foreign person', pronounced ngoi gwok yan.

CFMT-TV in Toronto, Canada had a cooking show named Gwai Lo Cooking (1999) hosted by a Cantonese-speaking European chef, who was also the show's producer and the person who named the show. According to CFMT-TV, Gwai Lo was used as "a self-deprecating term of endearment". In response to some complaints, the Canadian Broadcast Standards Council ruled that:

While historically, gwai lo' may have been used by Chinese people as a derogatory remark concerning foreigners, particularly European Westerners, the persons consulted by the Council indicate that it has since lost much of its derogatory overtone. The Council finds that the expression has also lost most of its religious meaning, so that "foreign devil" no longer carries the theological significance it once did. Based on its research, the Council understands that the expression has gone from being considered offensive to, at worst, merely "impolite".

== Related terms ==
Gwai is one of a number of terms to referring to non-Chinese people that can be considered controversial and potentially offensive; a list of such terms is given below:

- gwaijai (鬼仔; Cantonese Yale: gwáijái; lit. 'ghost boy') for a white boy.
- gwaimui (鬼妹; Cantonese Yale: gwáimūi; lit. 'ghost girl') for a white girl.
- gwaipo (鬼婆; Cantonese Yale: gwáipòh; lit. 'ghost woman') for white woman.
- baakgwai (白鬼; Cantonese Yale: baahkgwái; lit. 'white ghost') for white people.
- haakgwai (黑鬼; Cantonese Yale: hāakgwái; lit. 'black ghost') for black people.
- sai yan (西人; Cantonese Yale: sāi yàhn; lit. 'western person') for Westerners.
- yeung yan (洋人; Cantonese Yale: yèuhng yàhn; lit. 'overseas person') for Westerners.
- ngoigwok yan (外國人; Cantonese Yale: ngoihgwok yàhn; lit. 'foreign country person') for foreign nationals.
- acha (阿差; Cantonese Yale: achā; from "acchā" meaning "good" in Hindi) for South Asians. This term is considered offensive to South Asians local to Hong Kong, e.g., Hong Kong locals of Indian and/or Pakistani descent, and is not widely used.
- molocha (摩囉差; Cantonese Yale: mōlōchā; lit. 'Mouro Indian') for South Asians.

=== Mandarin Chinese ===
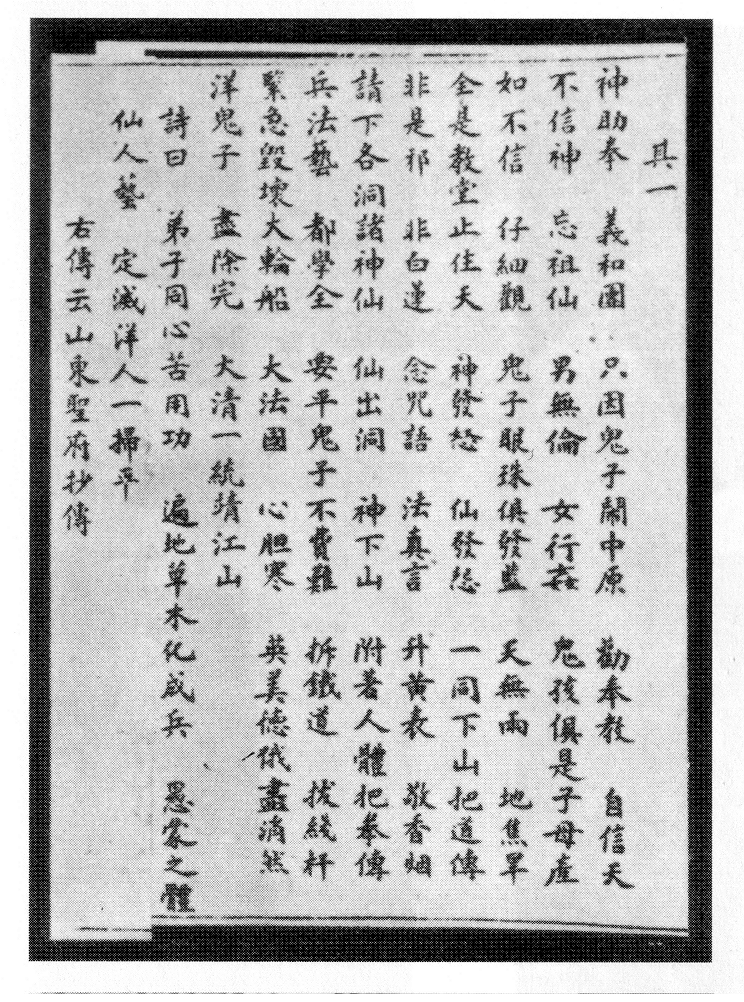
A Boxer Rebellion pamphlet, circa 1899, that refers to foreigners as guizi.

Guizi (鬼子; pinyin: guǐzi) is a Mandarin Chinese slang term for foreigners, and has a long history of being used as a racially deprecating insult.

- Riben guizi (日本鬼子; pinyin: rìběn guǐzi; lit. 'Japanese devil') or dongyang guizi (東洋鬼子; pinyin: dōngyáng guǐzi; lit. 'east ocean devil') – used to refer to Japanese.
- Er guizi (二鬼子; pinyin: èr guǐzi; lit. 'second devil') – used to refer to the Korean soldiers who were a part of the Japanese army during the Sino-Japanese War in World War II.
- Yang guizi (洋鬼子; pinyin: yáng guǐzi; lit. 'Western/overseas devil') or xiyang guizi (西洋鬼子; pinyin: xiyáng guǐzi; lit. 'west ocean devil') – used to refer to Westerners.

However, xiaogui (小鬼; pinyin: xiǎoguǐ; lit. 'little ghost') is a common term in Mandarin Chinese for a child. Therefore, some argue that gui (鬼) in Mandarin is just a neutral word that describes something unexpected or hard to predict.

Laowai (老外; pinyin: lǎowài; lit. 'old foreigner/outsider') is the word most commonly used for foreigners and is a less pejorative term than guizi. Although laowai literally means "old foreigner", depending on context, "old" can be both a term of endearment and one of criticism.

== See also ==
- Ang Mo
- Bule
- Chinaman
- Devils on the Doorstep (Guizi lai le) by Jiang Wen
- Martin Booth's Gweilo: Memories of a Hong Kong Childhood
- Graphic pejoratives in written Chinese
- Farang
- Gaijin
- Gringo
- Goy
- Guizi
- Gweilo Beer
- Haole
- Laowai
- List of ethnic slurs
- Mat Salleh
- Round Eyes in the Middle Kingdom (documentary)
