= Farang =

Persian word for Europeans

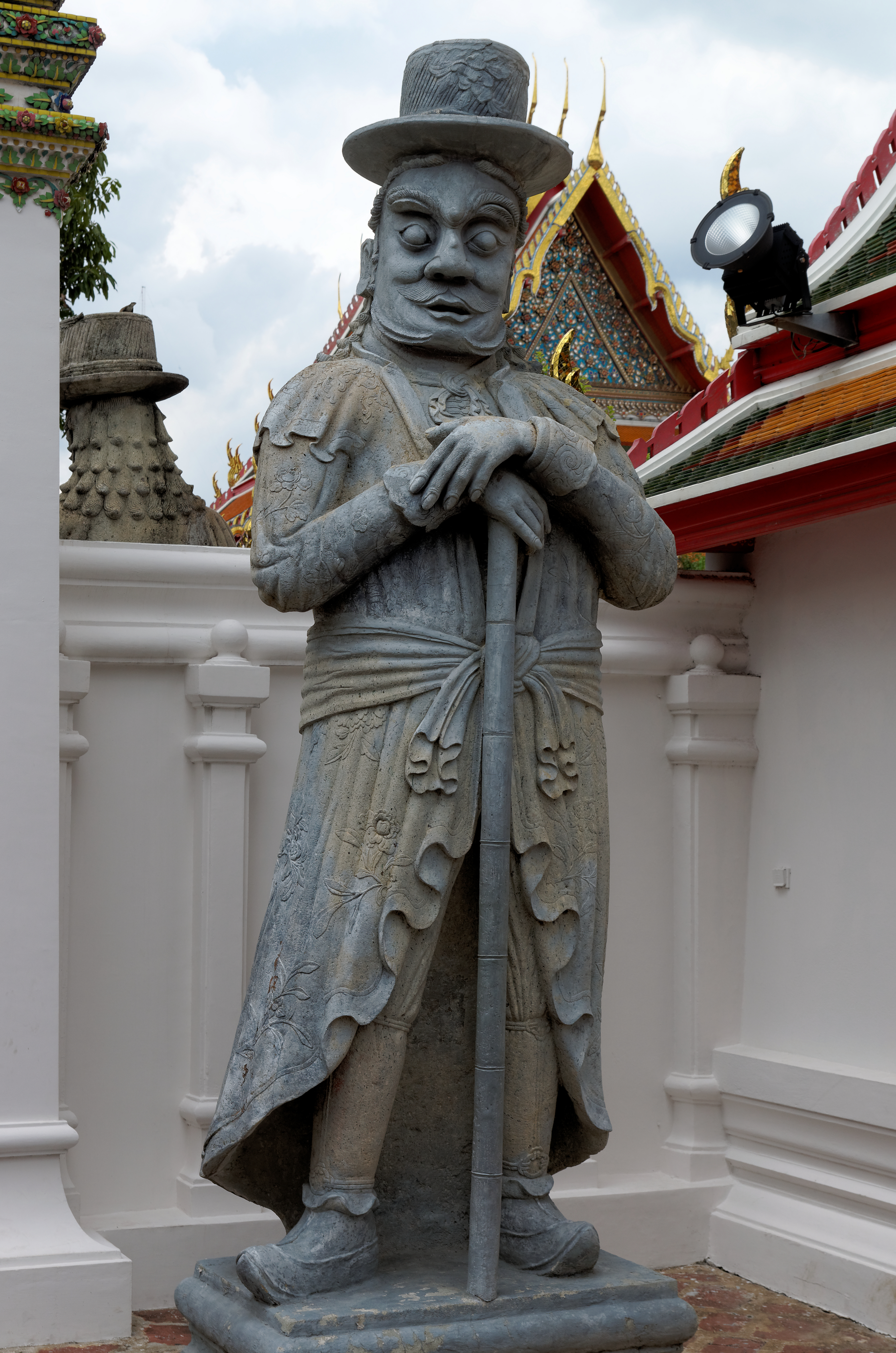
Depiction of farang as a stone guard at Wat Pho in Bangkok; circa 1824–1851

Farang (Persian: فرنگ [fæˈɹæŋg]) is a Persian word that originally referred to the Franks (the major Germanic people) and later came to refer to Western or Latin Europeans in general. The word is borrowed from Old French franc or Latin francus, which are also the source of Modern English France, French.

The Western European and Eastern worlds came into prolonged contact with each other during the crusades and the establishment of the Crusader states. Many crusaders spoke Old French and were from the territory of modern France; while others came from other regions, such as modern Italy or England. In any case, the period predated the idea of the nation state in Europe. Frank or its equivalent term were used by both Medieval Greeks and Easterners to refer to any crusader or Latin Christian. From the 12th century onwards, it was the standard term for Western Christians in the Eastern world.

Through trading networks, the Persian term farang and related words such as Frangistan (Persian: فرنگستان) were spread to languages of East Africa, South Asia and Southeast Asia.

== Origin and geographic spread ==
=== Persian ===
The Persian word farang (فرنگ) or farangī (فرنگی), refers to Franks, the major Germanic tribe ruling Western Europe. Frangistan (Persian: فرنگستان) was a term used by Easterners from the Muslim world and Persians in particular, during the Middle Ages and later periods, to refer to Western or Latin Europe. According to Rashid-al-Din Hamadani, the Arabic word "Afranj" comes from the Persian "Farang". This seems unlikely though, considering that the Arabic "Afranj" (also "Faranj" or "Ifranj") has been attested since the 9th century in the works of al-Jahiz (c. 776–868/869), over a century before "Farang" was first used in an anonymous late-10th-century Persian geography book. By the 11th century, Arabic texts were increasingly using the term "Faransa" or "al-Faransiyah" for France, already attested in the work of Said al-Andalusi in the mid-11th century.

=== Ethiopia and Eritrea ===
In the languages of Ethiopia and Eritrea, faranj or ferenj in most contexts still means distant foreigner (generally used to describe Europeans or European descendant/white people), in certain contexts within the Ethiopian and Eritrean diaspora, the term faranj or ferenj has taken on a slightly alternative meaning that closely resembles the term Westerner or Westernized people even though it still mostly applies to European descendants/White People, it can be applied to African Americans and other Westernized People of Color.

=== Somalia ===
The term 'Faranji' is used in Somalia, particularly in the northern and central regions, to refer to white people and various elements of Western culture, such as clothing, music, and other civilizational aspects. For example, someone wearing Western-style attire might be described as "dressing like a faranji," or a European musical instrument could be called a "faranji instrument." Unlike the more offensive term 'Gaal'—which traditionally denotes non-Muslims but is often narrowly applied to white people and Western influences—'faranji' is relatively neutral or even positive. It typically signifies an association with Western civilization, implying sophistication or dominance, even when used critically.

=== South, Southeast and East Asia ===
During the Muslim Mughal Empire when the Europeans arrived in South Asia, the Persian word Farang was used to refer to foreigners of European descent. The words also added to local languages such as Hindi/Urdu as firangi (Devanāgarī: फिरंगी and Urdu فرنگی) and Bengali as firingi (ফিরিঙ্গি). The word was pronounced paranki (പറങ്കി) in Malayalam, parangiar in Tamil, parangi in Sinhala, and Malay as ferenggi. From there the term spread into China as folangji (佛郎機), which was used to refer to the Portuguese and their breech-loading swivel guns when they first arrived in China.

== Regional evolution ==
=== South Asia ===
In Bangladesh and West Bengal, the modern meaning of firingi (ফিরিঙ্গি) refers to Anglo-Bengalis or Bengalis with European ancestry. Most firingis tend to be Bengali Christians. Descendants of firingis who married local Bengali women may also be referred to as Kalo Firingis (Black firingis) or Matio Firingis (Earth-coloured firingis). Following the Portuguese settlement in Chittagong, the Portuguese fort and naval base came to be known as Firingi Bandar or the Foreigner's Port. There are also places such as Firingi Bazaar which exist in older parts of Dhaka and Chittagong. The descendants of these Portuguese traders in Chittagong continue to be referred to as Firingis. The Indian biographical film Antony Firingee was very popular in the mid-20th century and was based on Anthony Firingee – a Bengali folk singer of Portuguese origin. There is also a river in the Sundarbans called Firingi River.

In Telugu phirangi (ఫిరంగి) means cannon, due to cannons being an import.

The word parangi in Sinhala (පරංගි) and Malayalam (പറങ്കി) languages is used to refer to the Portuguese people. The poem Parangi Hatana in Sinhalese describes the Battle of Gannoruwa. The name for the cashew tree in Malayalam is Parangi Maavu (പറങ്കിമാവ്).

In the Maldives faranji was the term used to refer to foreigners of European origin, especially the French. Until recently the lane next to the Bastion in the northern shore of Malé was called Faranji Kalō Gōlhi.

=== Southeast Asia ===
Edmund Roberts, US envoy to Cochin-China, Siam, and Muscat in the early 1830s, defined the term as "Frank (or European)". Black people are called farang dam (Thai: ฝรั่งดำ; 'black farang') to distinguish them from whites. This began during the Vietnam War, when the United States military maintained bases in Thailand. The practice continues in present-day Bangkok.

In modern Thailand, the Royal Institute Dictionary 1999, the official dictionary of Thai words, defines the word as "a person of white race". The term is also blended into everyday terms meaning "of/from the white race". For example, varieties of food/produce that were introduced by Europeans are often called farang varieties. Hence, potatoes are man farang (Thai: มันฝรั่ง), whereas man (Thai: มัน) alone can be any tuber; no mai farang (Thai: หน่อไม้ฝรั่ง; "farang shoot") means asparagus; culantro is called phak chi farang (Thai: ผักชีฝรั่ง, literally farang cilantro/coriander); and chewing gum is mak farang (Thai: หมากฝรั่ง). Mak (Thai: หมาก) is Thai for areca nut; chewing mak together with betel leaves (bai phlu) was a Thai custom. A non-food example is achan farang (Thai: อาจารย์ฝรั่ง; "farang professor") which is the nickname of an influential figure in Thai art history, Italian art professor Silpa Bhirasri.

Farang is also the Thai word for the guava fruit, introduced by Portuguese traders over 400 years ago.

Farang khi nok (Thai: ฝรั่งขี้นก, lit. 'bird-droppings Farang'), also used in Lao, is slang commonly used as an insult to a person of white race or one who puts on foreign airs, as khi means feces and nok means bird, referring to the white color of bird-droppings.

In the Isan Lao dialect, the guava is called mak sida (Thai: หมากสีดา), mak being a prefix for fruit names. Thus bak sida (Thai: บักสีดา), bak being a prefix when calling males, refers jokingly to a Westerner, by analogy to the Thai language where farang can mean both guava and Westerner.

== See also ==
- Ang Mo (Malaysia and Singapore)
- Buckra
- Barang (Khmer, Cambodia)
- Bule (Indonesia)
- Cracker
- Ferengi – a fictional species in Star Trek
- Firangi (India and Pakistan)
- Firingi Bazar (Bangladesh)
- Gaijin (Japan)
- Frank used in the time of Marco Polo for a western foreigner.
- Mat Salleh (Malaysia/ Brunei / Singapore / Southern Thailand / West Indonesia)
- Gringo (Latin America)
- Gweilo (Southern China/Hong Kong)
- Honky
- Huanna
- Luk khrueng
- Whitey
