= Japie Laubscher =

South African musician

Japie Laubscher (1919–1981) was a concertina player of Boeremusiek in South Africa. Per Denis-Constant Martin: "[he] used a singular kind of tremolo, akin to the characteristic vibrato of langarm saxophonists that, according to Vincent Kolbe, may originate in the fiddle traditions of Cape Town (Nixon 1997:21)".
