= Ang mo =

Hokkien word for white people

- Hàn-jī: 紅毛
- Pe̍h-ōe-jī: Âng-mô͘
- Literal meaning: red-haired
- Tâi-lô: Âng-môo
- IPA: [aŋ˧ mɔ̃˧˥]

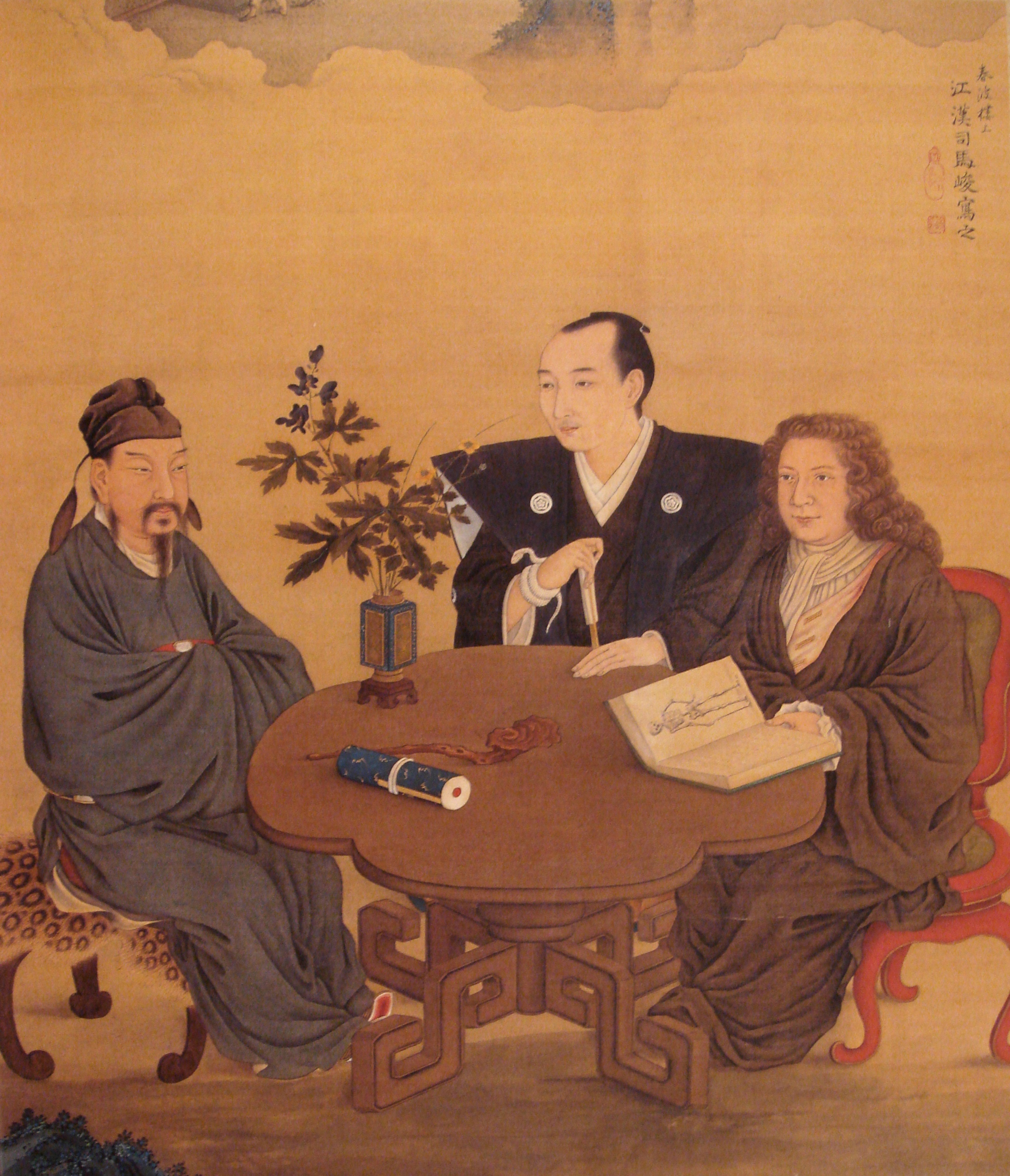
A Meeting of Japan, China and the West (Shiba Kōkan, late 18th century); the "Westerner" is depicted with red hair.

Ang mo or ang moh (Chinese: 紅毛; Pe̍h-ōe-jī: âng-mô͘ / âng-mn̂g; lit. 'red hair') is a descriptor used to refer to white people. It is used mainly in Malaysia and Singapore, and sometimes in Thailand and Taiwan. It literally means "red-haired" and originates from Hokkien, a variety of Southern Min.

Other similar terms include ang mo kow (紅毛猴; 'red-haired monkey'), ang mo kui (紅毛鬼; 'red-haired devil'), ang mo lang (紅毛儂 / 紅毛人; 'red-haired people'). Although the term has historically had some derogatory connotations, it has entered common parlance as a neutral term in Singapore and Malaysia, where it refers to a white person or, when used as an adjective, Western culture in general.

== Etymology and history ==
The earliest origin for the term ang mo could be traced to the contact between Hokkien (Southern Min) speakers in southern Fujian with the Portuguese Empire and Dutch East India Company during the Haijin ("Sea Ban") period in the 16th and 17th centuries. One of the earliest known uses of the term in writing is found in the early 1600s Selden Map, which labels the Maluku Islands of Indonesia with ang mo, likely referring to the Dutch presence there. In the late 1500s, Ming Ministry of Justice official Wang Linheng submitted a memorial reporting on the arrival of "red-haired devils" on China's southern coast, while in 1755 Zhejiang provincial authorities reported on the arrival of "red hair" seafarers under British merchant James Flint.

During the 17th century, the Dutch East India Company failed in its attempt to force their way into Fujian to trade in the 1620s during the Sino-Dutch conflicts and were called ang mo by the locals. The Dutch East India Company and then the Spanish Empire had colonized Taiwan, and the Spanish built Fort Santo Domingo in Tamsui, Taiwan. The Dutch later drove the Spanish out and seized the fort, which also became known as the "City of the Red-Haired" (Chinese: 紅毛城; pinyin: hóng máo chéng; Pe̍h-ōe-jī: Âng-mn̂g-siâⁿ) in Taiwanese Hokkien. Dutch people were known in Taiwan as ang mo lang ("red-haired people") in Taiwanese Hokkien. This is most likely because red hair is a relatively common trait among the Dutch. This historical term ang mo lang continues to be used in the context of Taiwanese history to refer to Dutch people.

The Chinese characters for ang mo are the same as those in the historical Japanese term kōmō (紅毛), which was used during the Edo period (1603–1868) as an epithet for (Northwestern Europeans) white people. It primarily referred to Dutch traders who were the only Europeans allowed to trade with Japan during the Sakoku, its 200-year period of isolation. Portuguese and Spanish traders were in contrast referred to as nanban (南蛮), which is in turn cognate to the Chinese nanman and means "southern barbarians".

During the 19th century, Walter Henry Medhurst made a reference in his academic work A Dictionary of the Hok-Këèn Dialect of the Chinese Language that âng mô ("red haired") generally applied to the English people. With the large migration of the Hoklo to Southeast Asia, predominantly Malaysia and Singapore, the term ang moh became more widespread and was used to refer to white people in general.

== Racial controversy ==
The term ang mo is sometimes viewed as racist and derogatory. Others, however, maintain it is acceptable. It is a widely used term, at least among non-Westerners. It appears, for instance, in Singaporean newspapers such as The Straits Times, and in television programs and films.

== Derogatory context ==
In Singapore and Malaysia, the term ang mo sai (Chinese: 紅毛屎; lit. 'red-haired shit') was historically used as an insult for English-educated Chinese people.

== See also ==
- Ang Mo Kio
- Barang
- Bule
- Farang
- Gweilo
- Mat Salleh
- Totok
