= Barang (Khmer word) =

Khmer term meaning "French"

Barang (Khmer: បារាំង [ɓaːraŋ] or [paːraŋ]) is a Khmer term meaning French, a Cambodian rendition of the word France.

As a remnant of the French colonial rule in Cambodia and the resulting significant French minority in Cambodia, in some regions of Cambodia the locals will often simply assume people of European ancestry to be French and refer to them as barang.

== Etymology ==
Since Khmer phonology does not have the unvoiced fricative f, it is pronounced with the voiced plosive b. In many of Khmer's loanwords, a n often changes to an ng, as in the word Allœmáng (អាល្លឺម៉ង់, "Germany" or "German") which comes from the French word Allemand. The rarely used Khmer term Barăngsês (បារាំងសែស) also shows its relation to the word Français.

== Usage ==
Barang is also used as a suffix in some Khmer words such as moan barang (មាន់បារាំង, "French chicken") which refers to a turkey as well as khtuem barang (ខ្ទឹមបារាំង, "French allium") which refers to an onion.

== See also ==
- Farang
