= Mat Salleh =

Malay term for white people

Mat Salleh is a Malay term used as a colloquial expression to refer to white people. The exact origins of the expression are difficult to ascertain, due to there being several versions of the term's origin being passed down via word of mouth, with little or no official documentation to support such oral claims. The term arose during the colonial period of Malaysian history and is still commonly used.

== Etymology ==
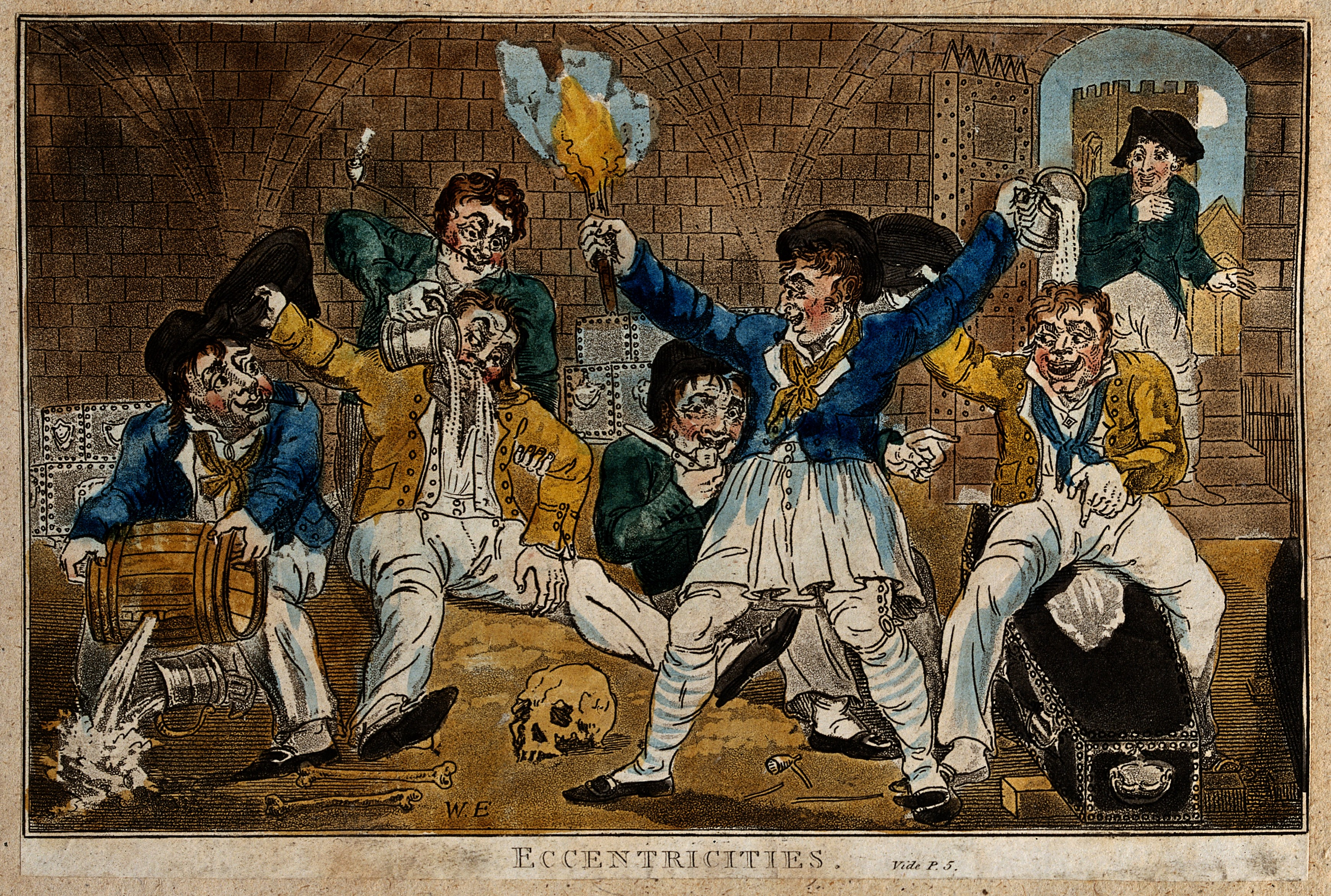
A group of white sailors drinking. The phrase "mat salleh" possibly derives from "mad sailors", a dismissive term applied to white sailors on leave in British Malaya.

One etymological story claims the word might have been derived from the colloquial expression "mad sailor". The first encounter many Malays had with white foreigners were dignified and upper-class colonial officials, leading the Malays to both admire these foreigners and assume all white people behaved as such. When warships began to put into Malayan ports to collect supplies, sailors were given leave to disembark their ships and spend time in port. These were typically working-class men who enjoyed getting drunk and brawling amongst themselves. These behaviours shocked the Malays, who swiftly inquired to the colonial officials concerning the puzzling behaviour of the sailors. The colonial officials, not wishing the Malay image of them to dissipate, dismissed them as mere "mad sailors".

Another etymological story claims the term derives from another term which was applied to shipwrecked sailors who became stranded on Malayan shores. Upon encountering the native Malays, the story claims that many of these sailors ran away, assuming the Malays to be cannibals, with their erratic actions being deemed as "mad sailors" by other Europeans the Malays encountered.

It could also be from the words 'mat salih', which meant 'weird person'.

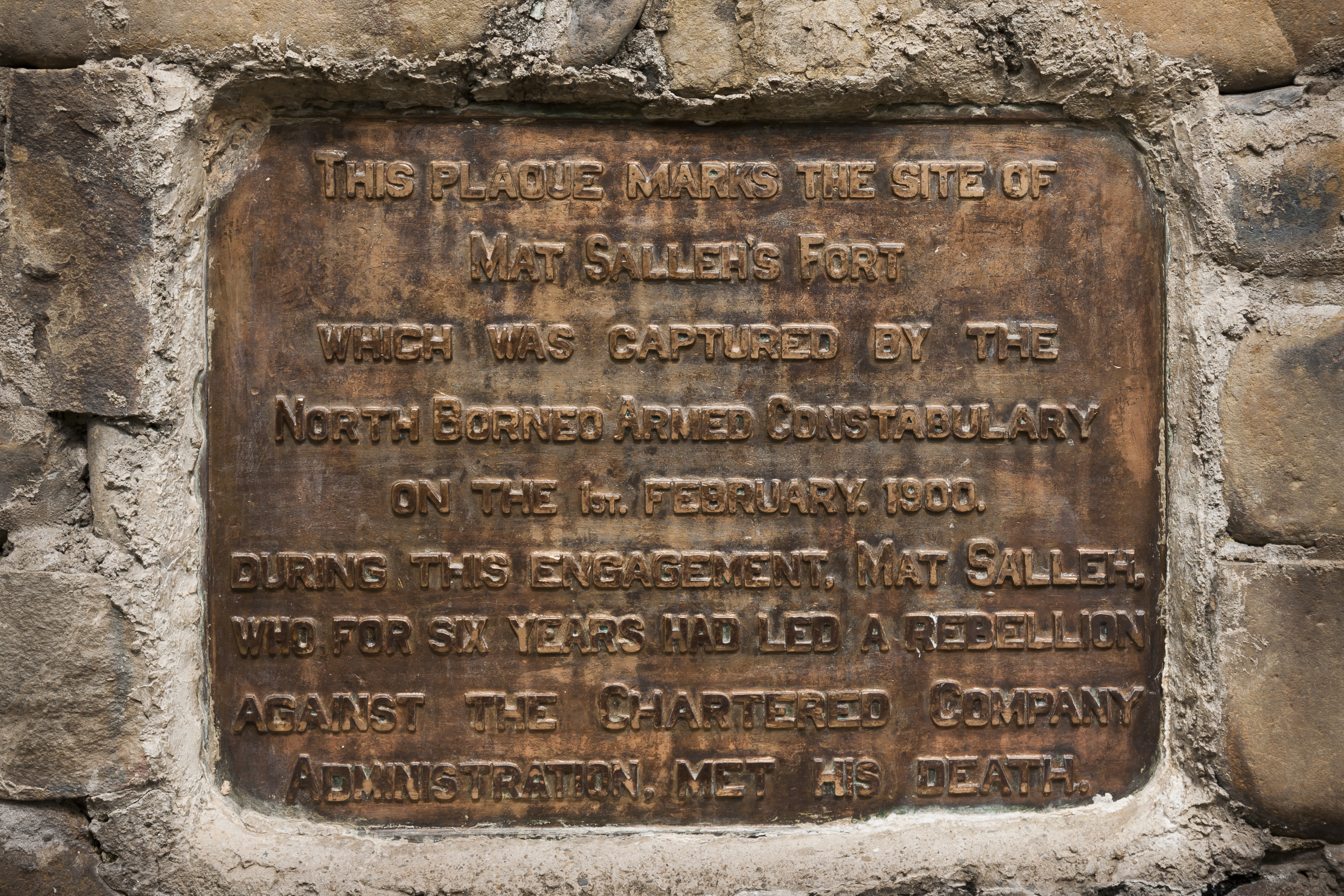
Memorial Stone near Tambunan, Sabah, Malaysia. The inscription reads: This place marks the site of Mat Salleh's Fort which was captured by the North Borneo Armed Constabulary on the 1st February 1900. During the engagement, Mat Salleh, who for six years had led a rebellion against the Chartered Company administration, met his death.

In the Malaysian state of Sabah, the term Mat Salleh was an utterance of defiance by Sabahans to remind the Orang Puteh (White People) of the Mat Salleh Rebellion against the military forces of the British North Borneo Chartered Company from 1895 to circa 1905. The enigmatic Mat Salleh led the 1897 attack on the Company's fort on Gaya island burning it to the ground. After 6 years of insurrection, his fort at Tambunan was shelled by artillery and destroyed in 1900 and he died by machine-gun fire. About 1,000 rebels died in that battle.

According to Hoogervorst (2015), it is more likely that the term is a reference to a Perak aristocrat of the same name who lived in the late 19th century. The Mat Salleh in question was one of the first Malay rulers to embrace and work for the British regime at the time.
