= List of ethnic slurs =

The following is a list of ethnic slurs, ethnophaulisms, or ethnic epithets that are, or have been, used as insinuations or allegations about members of a given ethnic, national, or racial group or to refer to them in a derogatory, pejorative, or otherwise insulting manner.

Some of the terms listed below can be used in casual speech without any intention of causing offense, while others may be much more offensive. The connotation of a term and prevalence of its use as a pejorative or neutral descriptor varies over time and by geography.

For the purposes of this list, an ethnic slur is a term designed to insult others on the basis of race, ethnicity, or nationality. Each term is listed followed by its country or region of usage, a definition, and a reference to that term.

Ethnic slurs may also be produced as a racial epithet by combining a general-purpose insult with the name of ethnicity. Common insulting modifiers include "dog", "pig", "dirty" and "filthy"; such terms are not included in this list.

== A ==
Ethnic slurs beginning with a
Term	Location or origin	Targets	Meaning, origin and notes	Ref
Abbie, Abe, Abie	United States, Canada	Jewish men	Originated before the 1950s. From the proper name Abraham.	
ABC	East Asia	American-born Chinese, Han or other Chinese (including Taiwanese) born and raised in the United States.	The term implies an otherness or lack of connection to their Chinese identity and (usually) Chinese language; however, it has been reappropriated by many Chinese Americans and used to convey positive connotations.	
ABCD	South Asians in the US	American-born confused desi, Indian Americans or other South Asian Americans, (desi) who were born in the United States.	Used chiefly by South Asian immigrants to imply confusion about cultural identity. Now often used in a positive, reclaimed sense.	
Abid / Abeed (plural)	Middle East and North Africa	Black people	Arabic word for slave	
Abo / Abbo	Australia	Australian Aboriginal person	Originally, this was simply an informal term for Aborigine, and was in fact used by Aboriginal people themselves (such as in the Aboriginal-run newspaper Abo Call) until it started to be considered offensive in the 1950s. Although Abo is still considered quite offensive by many, the pejorative boong is now more commonly used when the intent is deliberately to offend, as that word's status as an insult is unequivocal.	
Adoon / Adone	Somalia	Somali Bantus	Somali word for slave	
African (or Afro or colored) engineering or nigger rigging	United States	African Americans	Shoddy, second-rate or unconventional, makeshift workmanship. Indirectly refers to black American people as worse or lower-valued than white American people when associating anything bad with them.	
Ah Chah	Hong Kong	South Asian people	From 阿差; Cantonese Yale: achā; from "acchā" meaning "good" or "OK" in Hindi. Is less used in a derogatory fashion and more in a generalizing way in everyday conversation.	
Ah Tiong	Singapore	Chinese people	Borrowed from Hokkien 阿中 (a-tiong), where 中 (tiong) is a clipping of 中國 / 中国 (Tiong-kok, "China"). Initially used against mainland Chinese migrants and expatriates, its use as a slur has been broadened to include Chinese Singaporeans.	
Ali Baba	United States	Iraqi people	An Iraqi suspected of criminal activity.	
Alligator bait, 'gator bait	United States (chiefly southern U.S.)	Black people, especially black children	Dates from early 20th century or before; implies that African Americans are good for nothing except being used to bait alligators	
Alpine Serb	ex-Yugoslav countries	Slovenians	Due to Slovenia's Alpine nature or its proximity to Austria (an Alpine nation).	
AmaLawu, AmaQheya	South Africa	Khoisans and Cape Coloureds or Coloureds	Xhosa words for Hottentot	
Amalek, Amalekite	Israel	Palestinians	Refers to the biblical nation of Amalek, described as the great enemy of the Israelites. Gained prominence during the Gaza war.	
Ang mo	Malaysia, Singapore	European people, especially the Dutch	Hokkien for "red hair" referring to Dutch people from the 17th century and expanded to encompass other Europeans by the 19th century. It has become a neutral term, though is sometimes seen as derogatory.	
Ann	United States, Canada	White women, "white-acting" black women	While Miss Ann, also just plain Ann, is a derisive reference to white women, it is also applied to any black woman who is deemed to be acting as though she is white.	
Annamite, mites	French, English	Vietnamese people		
Ape	United States	Black people	Referring to outdated theories ascribing cultural differences between racial groups as being linked to their evolutionary distance from chimpanzees, with which all humans share common ancestry.	
Apple	United States, Canada	Native Americans	First used in the 1970s. Someone who is "red on the outside, white on the inside". Used primarily by other Native Americans to indicate someone who has lost touch with their cultural identity.	
Arapis (Greek: Αράπης); feminine: arapissa, arapena		Black people and Arabs	From Turkish arap for "Arab" or, colloquially, "dark-skinned-person"	
Arabush / Araboosh / Aravush (ערבוש)	Israel	Arabs	Arabs, derived from Hebrew "Aravi" (Arab).	
Argie / Argies (plural)	United Kingdom	Argentine people	Extensively used by the British soldiers during the Falklands War in 1982.	
Armo	United States	Armenian / Armenian American	Especially used in Southern California.	
Asing, Aseng	Indonesia	Non-Indonesian people, especially Chinese people	Insult to non-Indonesian citizen, from "[orang] asing" (foreigner) that rhymed with "Aseng" (Chinese name). This word is often directed at Chinese people due to Indonesia's relationship with the PRC.	
Ashke-Nazi (אשכנאצי)	Israel	Ashkenazi Jews	Pronounced like "AshkeNatzi". Used mostly by Mizrachi Jews.	
Aunt Jemima / Aunt Jane / Aunt Mary / Aunt Sally	United States	Black women	A black woman who "kisses up" to whites, a "sellout", female counterpart of Uncle Tom.	

== B ==
Ethnic slurs beginning with b
Term	Location or origin	Targets	Meaning, origin and notes	Ref
Bachicha	Chile	Italian people	Possibly derived from the Italian word Baciccia, a nickname for Giambattista.	
Baiano	Brazil	Northeastern Brazilian people	A person born in Bahia, one of the 9 states in the Northeast Region of Brazil. As a slur, it refers generically to any Northeastern person. Used mainly in São Paulo, the term is related to the Northeastern immigration of the second half of the 20th century.	
Balija	Turkey, the Balkans	Bosnian people	An ethnic Bosniak or a member of the Bosnian diaspora. Not to be confused with Balija (Indian caste).	
Baluba	Northern Italy	Southern Italians and Africans	Mainly used in Lombardy region, it is derived from the name of the Luba people of Central Africa. It has been used as an insult meaning "savage" or "uncivilized". It probably originated during the Congo Crisis.	
Bamboula	France	Black people		
Bambus	Poland	Black people, sometimes Asian people	Literally it means bamboo in Polish but most probably it's derived from a popular children's poem Murzynek Bambo.	
Banaan	Suriname	Black people, people of African descent	Dutch: Banana. A slur that is used to refer to black people, people of African heritage. It derives from the colour of a banana's skin, which is yellow or brown, and is therefore seen as an offensive way to describe black and coloured people's skin colour.	
Banana	United States, Canada	East or Southeast Asian people	"Yellow on the outside, white on the inside". Used primarily by East or Southeast Asians for other East- or Southeast Asians or Asian Americans who are perceived as assimilated into mainstream American culture. Similar to Apple.	
Banderite	Poland	Ukrainians	The term Banderite was originally used to refer to the ultra-nationalist wing of the Organization of Ukrainian Nationalists, in reference to its leader Stepan Bandera. In Poland, the term "banderowiec" is used in connection with the massacres of Poles in Volhynia by the UPA. The term became a crucial element of Soviet propaganda and was used as a pejorative description of Ukrainian nationalists, or sometimes western Ukrainians or Ukrainian-speakers. Today the term is used in Russian propaganda to associate Ukrainian politics with Nazism.	
Bangla, Pankla	Italy	Bengalis	Informal Italian slang, derived from Bangladesh, used for people of Bengali or South Asian origin and sometimes corner stores run by them. Can be offensive depending on context.	
Barbarian	Greece	Non-Greek people	Someone who is perceived to be either uncivilized or primitive. βάρβαρος (barbaros pl. βάρβαροι barbaroi). In Ancient Greece, the Greeks used the term towards those who did not speak Greek and follow classical Greek customs.	
Barya / Bareya	Ethiopia, Eritrea	Sub-Saharan Africans racially considered non-Ethiopian	The term Barya originally referred to the Nara people, and through centuries of slave raiding and social stratification it came to mean "slave" in Amharic and related languages.	
Ba que	Vietnam	Vietnamese diaspora after the country's reunification	Literally "three sticks", in reference to the flag of South Vietnam. The original meaning refers to a children trick game, later used by the communists and opponents of South Vietnam to condemn the latter as a corrupt and scheming regime.	
Beaner / Beaney	United States	Hispanic or Latino people, especially Mexicans	The term originates from the use of frijoles pintos and other beans that can be generally found in Mexican food or other Hispanic and Latino foods.	
Bidde (m.) Biddad (f.)	Somalia	Somali Bantus	Somali word for slave	
Bimbo	German	Africans, people with very dark skin in general	The origin of this term is disputed, but experts suggest that it either derives from the Central African town of Bimbo, or from the former state of Bimbia, which was annexed by the German colony of Kamerun. It is not related to the similar-sounding English slang word.	
Bing / Binghi	Australia	Aboriginal Australians	"Binghi" was originally an aboriginal word for "brother". Later generalized to all Aboriginal Australians.	
Bingo-Bongo	Italy	Black people		
Black Buck, black brute, brown buck or brown brute	United States	Black men	Originating in the post-Reconstruction United States, it was used to describe black men who absolutely refused to bend to the law of white authority and were seen as irredeemably violent, rude, and lecherous.	
Blackie	English	Black person		
Blatte	Sweden	Foreigners with dark skin		
Bluegum	United States	African Americans	An African American perceived as being lazy and unwilling to work.	
Boche / bosche / bosch	France; United States; United Kingdom	German people	Shortened from the French term caboche dure, meaning "hard head" or "cabbage head" with the influence of German surname Bosch.	
Boeotian	Athenians	Boeotian Greek people	Referring to the supposed stupidity of the inhabitants of the neighboring Boeotia region of Greece.	
Boerehater / Boer-hater / Boer hater	South Africa; United Kingdom	British people	Refers to a person who hates, prejudices, or criticizes the Boers, or Afrikaners – historically applied to British people who held anti-Boers sentiments.	
Bog / Bogtrotter / Bog-trotter	United Kingdom, Ireland, United States	Irish people	A person of common or low-class Irish ancestry.	
Bogate	Chile	Yugoslav people	The expression is said to come from the Yugoslav interjection Boga ti!	
Bohunk	United States, Canada	Bohemian people	A lower-class immigrant of Central, Eastern, or Southeastern European descent. Originally referred to those of Bohemian (now Czech Republic) descent. It was commonly used toward Central European immigrants during the early 20th century. Probably from Bohemian + a distortion of Hungarian. See also hunky.	
Bolita	Argentina	Bolivians		
Bong	India	Bengali people		
Boong / Boang / Bong / Bung	Australia	Aboriginal Australians	[First used in 1847 by JD Lang, Cooksland, 430]. Boong, pronounced with ʊ (like the vowel in bull), is related to the Australian English slang word bung, meaning "dead", "infected", or "dysfunctional". From bung, to go bung "Originally to die, then to break down, go bankrupt, cease to function [Ab. bong dead]". The 1988 edition of the Australian National Dictionary gives its origin in the Wemba word for "man" or "human being". However, Frederick Ludowyk of the Australian National Dictionary Centre wrote in 2004 that bong meaning "dead" is not a Wiradjuri word, but may have been picked up or assumed from the word "bung" which was originally a Yagara word which was used in the pidgin widely spoken across Australia in colonial times.	
Boonga / boong / bunga / boonie	New Zealand	Pacific Islanders	Likely derived from the similar Australian slur	
Bootlip	United States	African American people		
Bougnoule	France, Wolof	Arabian people, North Africans, Black people	Analogous to Wog or Raghead, originally was used against Black people but broadened to brown Arabs	
Bounty bar	United Kingdom	Black people	A black person who is considered to be behaving like a white person (i.e. dark on the outside, white on the inside).	
Bozgor	Romania	Hungarian people	Used especially on ones born in Romania. Possibly derived from the Moldavian Csángó dialect pronunciation of bocskor meaning Opanak, a type of rustic footwear.	
Brass Ankle / Brass Ankles	South Carolina Lowcountry	Mixed-race people	Historically used for people perceived as white but known or suspected to have some African or Native American ancestry. In the 20th century, anthropologists also applied the term to particular communities they classified as "racial isolates."	
Brillo Pad	United States	Black People	Used to refer to the hair of a black person	
Brownie	United States, New Zealand, and Australia	Brown-skinned people, an Asian	Used in the 1850s–1960s; in Australia it was used for an Aboriginal Australian or someone Japanese; in New Zealand, a Māori	
Buckwheat	United States	Black people	The name of a black character that appeared in the Our Gang (Little Rascals) short films. Today it is used to refer to the curly hair of a black person.	
Buddhahead	United States	Asian people	Also used by mainland Japanese Americans to refer to Hawaiian Japanese Americans since World War II.	
Buckra, Bakra	United States, West Indies	White people from Sub-Saharan African languages		
Bulbash	Russia, Ukraine	Belarusians	Derived from Belarusian word "bulba" (potatoes), based on the fact that potatoes are a very common ingredient in Belarusian cuisine.	
Bule	Indonesia	White people or foreigner	Derived from an archaic Indonesian word for albino.	
Bumbay	Philippines	People from India	From Bombay	
Burrhead / Burr-head / Burr head	United States	Black people	Referencing Afro-textured hair.	
Bushy (s.) / Bushies, Amadushie (p.)	South Africa	Khoisans	Historically used against the Khoisan people in Southern Africa, referring to their nomadic lifestyle and reliance on the bush for survival.	
Buzzurro	Italy	Northern Italians and Italian-speaking Swiss	It is an Italian derogatory term historically used to label Northern Italians perceived as unsophisticated or rural. In Tuscany, it targeted Swiss-Italian chestnut and polenta sellers from the Alps, while in Rome it was primarily directed at Piedmontese migrants who arrived after the city became the capital of the Kingdom of Italy.	

== C ==
Ethnic slurs beginning with c
Term	Location or origin	Targets	Meaning, origin and notes	Ref
Cabbage eater		German and Russian people		
Cacariso, Cagariso	Italy	East Asian people	Literally "rice shitter"	
Canaca	Chile and Oceania	Chinese and Japanese people	Canaca is a slur originating in Oceania.	
Camel jockey		Middle Eastern people		
Camel drivers	Germany	Arabs and Turks		
Camel riders	Israel	Arabs		
Carcamano	Brazil	Italian people	Used during the early 20th century, during the Second wave of Italian immigration to Brazil.	
Chakhchakh / Baboon	Israel	Mizrahi Jews	An Israeli derogatory nickname that was common in the 20th century. The term is probably based on the accent immigrants from Islamic countries spoke.	
Chakma	Bangladesh	Jumma and Chinese people	The term "Chakma" comes from the name of an ethnic group known as Chakma and is used to refer to people with Mongoloid features in Bangladesh, especially Chinese, and other indigenous groups from the Chittagong Hill Tracts.	
Chankoro	Japan	Chinese people	Japanese: チャンコロ, a Japanese reference to a Chinese person. Often given as either derived from Chinese: 清國虜; pinyin: Qīngguólǔ (lit. 'Qing prisoner') or Chinese: 中國人; pinyin: Zhōngguórén (lit. 'Chinese person')	
Charlie	United States	White Americans	Used in the 1960s–1970s. White people as a reified collective oppressor group, similar to The Man or The System.	
Charlie	United States	Vietnamese people	Vietnam War slang term used by American troops as a shorthand term for Vietnamese guerrillas, derived from the verbal shorthand for "Victor Charlie", the NATO phonetic alphabet for VC, the abbreviation for Viet Cong. The (regular) North Vietnamese Army was referred to as "Mr. Charles".	
China Swede	United States	Finns	Derogatory term for Finnish immigrants to the United States, particularly in Minnesota and Michigan.	
Chee-chee, Chi-chi	South Asia	Eurasian Mixed-race people, especially Anglo-Indians	Probably derived from Hindi chi-chi fie!, literally, dirt.	
Cheese-eating surrender monkeys	United States	French people	The term originated with a 1995 episode of The Simpsons.	
Chefur (čefur)	Slovenia	Non-Slovenian people of former Yugoslavia (Serbs, Croats, Bosniaks, Montenegrins, Macedonians)		
Tsekwa / Chekwa	Philippines	Chinese Filipino people	Used in Filipino/Tagalog and other Philippine languages, which derived it from the late 19th century Cebuano Bisaya street children's limerick, Cebuano: Intsik, wákang, káun, kalibang!, lit. 'Chinese (laborer), I work, eat, and shit!', where "Intsik"/"Insik" is derived from the Philippine Hokkien term, Chinese: 𪜶 叔; Pe̍h-ōe-jī: in chek; lit. 'his/her/their uncle', while "wakang"/"gwakang" is derived from the Philippine Hokkien term, Chinese: 我 工; Pe̍h-ōe-jī: góa kang; lit. 'I work', while "kaon"/"kaun" is from the Cebuano Bisaya term, Cebuano: kaon, lit. 'to eat', while "kalibang" is from the Cebuano Bisaya term, Cebuano: kalibang, lit. 'to defecate'.	
Chernomazy	Russia	Black-skinned people, e.g. Africans or indigenous people from the Caucasus, e.g. from Chechnya or Azerbaijan.	черномазый, meaning "smeared in black" in Russian.	
Chernozhopy	Russia	Same as, but more insulting than, "chernomazy"	черножопый, or chornaya zhopa, meaning "black-arse" in Russian.	
Chilango	Mexico	Mexico City inhabitants		
Chilote	Argentina	Chilean people		
Chinaman	United States, Canada	Chinese people	A calque of the Chinese 中國人. It was used in the gold rush and railway-construction eras in western United States when discrimination against the Chinese was common.	
Ching chong	China, United States, Canada, United Kingdom, Ireland, Australia, New Zealand, Philippines	Chinese people	Mocking a person or language perceived to be of Chinese descent.	
Chink	China, United States, Canada, United Kingdom, Ireland, New Zealand, Australia, Philippines	East and South East Asians		
Chinky / Chinky Chonky	China, United States, Canada, United Kingdom, Ireland, New Zealand, Australia, Philippines	East and South East Asians		
Chirigüillo / Chiriwillo	Mexico	Non-White Mexican migrants	A pejorative term used in the state of Nuevo León to refer to Mexicans from white-minority regions who are singled out for their ethnicity, skin color, or rural origin.	
Chonky (Note: Not to be confused with the slang word Chonky.)		Asian people	Refers to a person of Asian heritage with "white attributes", in either personality or appearance.	
Christ-killer		Jewish people	An allusion to Jewish deicide.	
Choc ice		Black people	A person who is figuratively "black on the outside, white on the inside".	
Cholo	Latin America, Southwestern United States	Indigenous or Mestizo people	It may be derogatory depending on circumstances.	
Cholo	Chile	Bolivian people, Peruvian people		
Chon / Baka-Chon	Japan	Korean people		
Chow	Australia	Chinese people	Used as early as 1864, rare now	
Chowmein	India	Chinese people, Northeast Indians		
Chuchmek (Russian: чучмек) / Chechmek (Russian: чечмек)	Russia / Russian-speaking regions	Middle / Central Asian people (in rare instances people from the Caucasus), in a broader sense Non-Russians, Non-European-looking people	From Chichimec, a derogatory term used by the Aztecs and other Mesoamericans to describe the Chichimecs as "uncivilized, aggressive savages", similar to how the ancient Romans called Germanic tribes "barbarians". This name, with its derogatory meaning, was later adopted and brought to Europe by Spanish conquerors.	
Chug	Canada	Canadian aboriginal people	See Chugach for the native people.	
Chukhonets (plural chukhoncy), chukhna	Russia	Finnic people		
Churka (Russian: чурка)	Russia	Western and Central Asians	1. Chock of wood 2. Ignorant person	
Ciapaty, ciapak	Poland	Middle Eastern, North African, South Asian, and Caucasian people.	Derived from chapati.	
Cigányforma	Hungary	Persons with the combination of black hair with brown eyes, regardless of ethnicity	Used in 17th century Hungary; literal meaning is "gypsy form"	
Cigány népek	Hungary	Ethnic groups or nations where the combination of black hair with brown eyes is dominant	Used in 17th century Hungary; literal meaning is "gypsy folks"	
Cioară	Romania	Romani people and Black people	Means crow	
Cina / Cokin	Indonesia	Chinese people	Use in media has been banned since 2014 under Keppres (Keputusan Presiden, lit. Presidential Decree) No. 12 of 2014, replaced by Tiongkok (from Zhongguo 中国) or Tionghoa (from Zhonghua 中华). The Keppres even bans use of "China" in media and formal use.	
Coconut	United States, United Kingdom, New Zealand, Australia	Hispanics/Latinos, South/Southeast Asians	Named after the coconut, in the American sense, it derives from the fact that a coconut is brown on the outside and white on the inside. A person of Hispanic/Latino or South/Southeast Asian descent who is seen as being assimilated into white American culture.	
Coconut	United States, United Kingdom, New Zealand, Australia	South Asians	A brown person of South Asian descent is perceived as fully assimilated into Western culture.	
Coconut	United States, United Kingdom, New Zealand, Australia	Pacific Islander		
Colono	Brazil (mainly Rio Grande do Sul)	Italian Brazilians and German Brazilians	Although it is not generally considered an insult in other parts of Brazil, in Rio Grande do Sul it is considered pejorative because it is considered an offensive nickname similar to Caipira and is given to those who are native to the Rio Grande do Sul countryside (mainly Caxias do Sul and Bento Gonçalves), who are descendants of Italians or Germans and who have a strong accent compared to those who are native to the state's capital, Porto Alegre.	
Coño	Chile	Spanish people	Used in to refer to Spanish people given the perception that they recurrently use the vulgar interjection coño (lit. 'cunt').	
Coolie	United States, Canada	Asian people, usually Chinese, and Indo-Caribbean people	Unskilled Asian laborer (originally used in the 19th century for Chinese railroad laborers). Possibly from Mandarin "苦力" ku li or Hindi kuli, "day laborer." Also racial epithet for Indo-Caribbean people, especially in Guyana, Trinidad and Tobago and South African Indians.	
Coon, cooney	United States, Commonwealth	Black people	Slur popularized by Coon songs played at Minstrel show. Originally associated in the 1830s with the U.S. Whig Party who used a raccoon as their emblem. The Whigs were more tolerant towards blacks than other main parties. After the party folded the term "coon" evolved from political slang into a racial slur. Within African American communities, the word has been used to refer to a black person who is allegedly a "sellout".	
Coon, cooney	Australia	Aboriginal Australian		
Coon, cooney	New Zealand	Pacific Islander		
Coonass, Coon-ass	United States	Cajun people	Not to be confused with the French connasse, meaning cunt.	
Coreano	Chile	Chinese and Japanese people		
Cotton picker	United States	Individuals of African descent, including African-Americans and Cape Coloureds or Coloureds	Historically referred to someone who harvested cotton by hand, often used in the context of American slavery when enslaved black people were forced to pick cotton on plantations. The phrase originally referred to the actual occupation of picking cotton on plantations in the American South, but that it later became a racial slur used to denigrate people of African descent, including African-Americans and Cape Coloureds or Coloureds.	
Cracker	United States	White people, especially poor Appalachian and Southern people	Entered general use in the United States as a pejorative for white people, though may be used neutrally in context. Can specifically refer to white settlers, as with Florida or Georgia crackers.	
Crow	United States	Black people		
Crucco (m.), crucca (f.)	Italy	German people	From Serbo-Croatian kruh, meaning "bread". In WWI used for Austro-Hungarian prisoners of Croatian and Slovenian ethnicity in Italian camps because, when hungry, they supposedly begged for kruh. Later the term was used to indicate the Germans.	
Culchie	Ireland	Rural Irish people	Applied by townspeople or city folk as a condescending or pejorative reference to people from rural areas.	
Curepí	Paraguay	Argentines	A common term used by people from Paraguay for people from Argentina, it means "pig's skin".	
Curry-muncher	Australia, Africa, New Zealand, United States, Canada	South Asian People		
Cushi, Kushi (כושי)	Israel	Dark-skinned African people	Term originated from Kushite, referring to an individual from the Ancient Kingdom of Kush. This was also mentioned in the Hebrew Bible generally used to refer to people usually of African descent. Originally merely descriptive, in present-day Israel it increasingly assumed a pejorative connotation and is regarded as insulting by Ethiopian Israelis; and by non-Jewish, Sub-Saharan African migrant workers and asylum seekers in Israel.	
Czarnuch (m.), czarnucha (f.)	Poland	Black people	From "czarny" (black). Equivalent of nigger.	

== D ==
Ethnic slurs beginning with d
Term	Location or origin	Targets	Meaning, origin and notes	Ref
Dago, Dego	United States, Commonwealth	Italians, Spaniards, Greeks, Portuguese or Maltese people; in the United States, primarily used for Italians and people of Italian descent	Possibly derived from the Spanish name "Diego"	
Dal Khor	Pakistan	Indians and Pakistanis (specifically Punjabis)	The term literally translates to "dal eater", connoting the supposedly higher emphasis on pulses and vegetables in the diet of countryside Punjabis.	
Dalle, Batak Dalle	Indonesia	Batak people	Bataks who cannot speak their language or reject Batak culture.	
Darky / Darkey / Darkie	Worldwide	Black people	According to lexicographer Richard A. Spears, the word "darkie" used to be considered mild and polite, before it took on a derogatory and provocative meaning.	
DEI / DEI hire / Diversity hire	United States	Women and people of color (especially Black people)	The term is sometimes used to imply that women, non-white people, and members of the LGBTQ community are inherently unqualified for positions of power, and that they can only get jobs through tokenism.	
Dhoti	Nepal	Indian or Madheshi people	As reference to their indigenous clothing Dhoti worn by people of Indian subcontinent.	
Dink	United States	Southeast Asian, particularly Vietnamese people.	Originated during 1965–70 Americanism. Also used as a disparaging term for a North Vietnamese soldier or guerrilla in the Vietnam War. (Note: If rendered in ALL CAPS, then DINK may be the benign lifestyle acronym for dual-income, no kids [a couple with two incomes and no child-raising expenses])	
Dogan, dogun	Canada	Irish Catholics	19th century on; origin uncertain: perhaps from Dugan, an Irish surname.	
Dothead, Dot	United States	Hindu women	In reference to the bindi.	
Dune coon	United States	Arabian people	equivalent of sand nigger (below). See also Islamophobic trope.	

== E ==
Ethnic slurs beginning with e
Term	Location or origin	Targets	Meaning, origin and notes	Ref
Eight ball, 8ball		Black people	Referring to the black ball in pool. Slang, usually used disparagingly.	
Engelsman	South Africa	White South Africans of British descent whose first language is English	Afrikaans: Englishman. A derogatory term used to refer to white South Africans of British descent whose first language is English. This is due to historical and cultural tensions between English-speaking and Afrikaans-speaking white South Africans, which were fueled by British colonialism and apartheid policies. Some Afrikaans-speaking people view the English-speaking minority as elitist and condescending, and the use of the term "Engelsman" reflects these attitudes.	
Eyetie	United States, United Kingdom	Italian people	Originated through the mispronunciation of "Italian" as "Eye-talian". Slang usually used disparagingly (especially during World War II).	

== F ==
Ethnic slurs beginning with f
Term	Location or origin	Targets	Meaning, origin and notes	Ref
Falasha	Ethiopia	Ethiopian Jews	The colloquial Ethiopian/Eritrean term Falasha or Felasha, which means "landless", "wanderers", or "exiles", was given to the jewish community in the 15th century by the Emperor Yeshaq I, its use is now considered offensive.	
Fankui, fan-kui, fangui, gui-zi, guizi, gui	Chiefly Southeast Asia	Non-Chinese native people of Southeast Asia	These words (and any variations of them) are considered extremely derogatory, since they allege that anyone other than the Chinese have terrible attitudes and are uncivilised idiots (Gui or Guizi itself means demon).	
Fresh off the boat, off the boat		Asian Americans or immigrants in general	Referring to immigrants who have traveled to another foreign country and have yet acculturated into the nation's ethnicity or language, but still perpetuate their cultures. The slur also was the name for a sitcom named 'Fresh Off The Boat'.	
Farang khi nok	Thailand	Poor white people	Is slang commonly used to insult white people, equivalent to white trash, as khi means feces and nok means bird, referring to the white color of bird-droppings.	
Fenian	Northern Ireland, Scotland	Irish Catholics	Derived from the Fenian Brotherhood.	
Festival children (Russian: Дети фестиваля)	USSR (from late 1950s)	Children of mixed ancestry, usually with a father who is black or (more rarely) other non-European origins	It is believed that the first noticeable appearance of black and mixed-ancestry children in the USSR and Russia appeared after the 6th World Festival of Youth and Students of 1957. The term was often used ironically and sometimes in a mildly derogatory fashion. This term is currently not used.	
Feuj (verlan for juif)	France	Jewish people		
Fidschi(de)	East Germany	East or Southeast Asian people, particularly Vietnamese people	German for Fiji, used to refer to anyone who looks East or Southeast Asian, particularly those of Vietnamese origin.	
Filippino (m.), Filippina (f.)	Italy	Filipino people	It is used as a synonym for "domestic worker", stereotyping Filipinos as cleaners.	
Fjeldabe	Denmark	Norwegian people	Means mountain ape. Jocularly used by Danes mostly in sports. From the 1950s. Norway is mountainous while Denmark is flat without mountains.	
Flip	United States	Filipino people		
Fodechincho	Spain	Non-Galician Spaniards	A derogatory term used in Galicia to refer to tourists from Spain, especially those from Madrid, although also those from other locations, but above all to those who do not respect or adapt to local customs. It comes from Galician fode (to steal) and chincho (a small Atlantic horse mackerel).	
Franchute	Chile, Argentina	French people		
Frenk	Ashkenazi Jews	Sephardi and Mizrahi Jews	Derived from Franks (as a reference to Western Europeans), due to the fact Sephardi Jews are Judaeo-Spanish speakers.	
Fritz, fricc, fryc, фриц, fricis	United Kingdom, France, Hungary, Poland, Russia, Latvia	German people	From Friedrich (Frederick).	
Frog, Froggy, Frogeater, Froschfresser	Australia, Canada, United Kingdom, United States, Germany	Dutch people (formerly); French and French Canadian people (currently)	Before the 19th century, referred to the Dutch (as they were stereotyped as being marsh-dwellers). When France became Britain's main enemy, replacing the Dutch, the epithet was transferred to them, because of the French penchant for eating frogs' legs (see comparable French term Rosbif). Also known in Slavic countries, but only towards the (mainland) French, see Polish żabojad, Ukrainian zhaboyid (жабоїд), Russian lyagushatnik (лягушатник); as well as in Basque frantximant.	

== G ==
Ethnic slurs beginning with g
Term	Location or origin	Targets	Meaning, origin and notes	Ref
Gabacho	Spain, Chile	French people	From Occitan gavach meaning "one who speaks wrong."	
Gabacho	Mexico	American people, French people	Neutral or pejorative depending on context.	
Gabel	Albania, Kosovo	Romani people	Expression of disdain for someone, with the setting "Maxhup"	
Gabibbo / Cabibbo	Northern Italy	Southern Italians	Mainly used in Liguria region, it derives from habib ("friend"), a nickname used by Eritrean longshoremen at the port of Massawa. It is used toward Southern Italians, especially immigrants.	
Gadjo		Non-Romani people	Technically a term for a person who does not possess Romanipen, it usually refers to non-Romanis and Romanis who do not live within Romani culture.	
Gaijin (外人)	Japan	Foreigners, especially those of non-East Asian origin	Literally means 'foreigner'; the polite form Gaikokujin (外国人, literally 'person from a foreign country') is also in common use.	
Galla	Ethiopia, Somalia	Oromos	It began as a neutral Abyssinian exonym for the Oromo people, over time it gained insulting connotations of being pagan or uncivilized and is now widely considered a slur.	
Gam, Gammat	South Africa	Cape Coloured or Coloured people	It means "a person who is low or of inferior status" in Afrikaans.	
Gans (Ганс)	USSR	German people, or more uncommonly Latvian people	The term originated among the Soviet troops in World War II, coming from Russified form of the German first name Hans.	
Garoi	Romania	Romani people	It means crow.	
Geomdung-i (검둥이)	South Korea	Black people	Korean for coon	
Gexhë	Kosovo	Serbs of Šumadija	Derogatory expression for the Serbs of southern Serbia, of Šumadija.	
Gin	Australia	Aboriginal woman		Moore (2004), "gin"
Ginger	United Kingdom	Red-haired people	The term originates from the spicy ginger root and is often associated with a stereotype that red-haired people have a quick temper, often described metaphorically as 'spicy.'	
Gin jockey	Australia	White people	A white person having casual sex with an Aboriginal woman.	
Godo	Spain	Non-Canarian Spaniards	A word used in the Canary Islands to refer disparagingly to Spaniards, provided they are non-Canary Islanders. The word godo literally means "Gothic," originally referring to the Visigoths, which is a historical reference of the Visigothic Kingdom.	
Godon	France	English people	An antiquated pejorative expression. Possibly a corruption of "God-damn".	
Golliwog	United States, Australia, United Kingdom, New Zealand	Darkskinned people, especially African-Caribbeans	An expression which originally was a children's literature character and type of black doll but which eventually came to be used as a jibe against people with dark skin.	
Gook, Gook-eye, Gooky	United States	East and Southeast Asians, but particularly Koreans	The earliest recorded example is dated 1920. Used especially for enemy soldiers. Its use has been traced to United States Marines serving in the Philippines in the early 20th century. It gained widespread notice as a result of the Korean and Vietnam wars.	
Goombah	United States	Italian people, Italian-Americans	Initially applied to Italian or Italian-American men in general, it now also specifically carries connotations of stereotypical vulgar machismo and Italian Mafia or Italian-American Mafia involvement among ethnic Italians and Italian-Americans. However, "goombah" is also used among Italian-Americans themselves to refer to a friend or comrade; the word becomes pejorative mostly when used by a non-Italian to refer to an ethnic Italian or Italian-American in a derogatory or patronizing way rather than as a friendly term of address among Italian-Americans. Originates from the Southern Italian word cumpa or cumpari and the Standard Italian equivalent, compare, meaning "godfather" or "partner-in-crime".	
Gora	South Asia	White people	From the Hindi gorā, meaning "fair, white".	
Goy, Goyim	Hebrew	Non-Jewish people	A Hebrew biblical term for "Nation" or "People". By Roman times it had also acquired the meaning of "non-Jew". In English, use may be benign, to refer to anyone who is not Jewish, or controversial, as it can have pejorative connotations.	
Grago, Gragok (shrimp)		Eurasians, Kristang people	A term for Eurasians, and specifically for the Kristang people of Malaysia, many of whom were traditionally engaged in shrimp fishing. It often has pejorative connotations, especially when used by outsiders, though in recent generations members of the community have to some degree tried to reclaim the term.	
Greaseball, Greaser	United States	Mediterranean / Southern European and Hispanic people, and especially Italian people.	Greaseball often generally refers to Italians or a person of Italian descent. Meanwhile, though it may be used as a shortening of greaseball to refer to Italians, greaser has been more often applied to Hispanic Americans or Mexican Americans. However, greaseball (and to a lesser extent, greaser) can also refer to any person of Mediterranean/Southern European descent or Hispanic descent, including Greeks, Spaniards, and the Portuguese, as well as Latin Americans. Greaser also refer to members of a 1950-1960s subculture which Italian Americans and Hispanic Americans were stereotyped to be a part of. "Greaser" in reference to the subculture has taken on a less derogatory connotation since the 1950s.	
Greenhorn	United States, New England region, especially Massachusetts.	Portuguese people	Can also be used in a non-derogatory context when not referring to the Portuguese to mean anyone inexperienced at something.	
Gringo	Spanish speakers, mostly Latin America	English speakers	Sometimes used by Latino Americans. In Mexico, the term means an American. Likely from the Spanish word "griego", meaning Greek (similar to the English expression "It's all Greek to me").	
Gringo	Brazil	Foreigners	A colloquial neutral term for any foreigner, regardless of race, ethnicity or origin (including Portuguese people), or for a person whose native language is not Portuguese (including people whose native language is Spanish).	
Gringo	Southern Brazil	Italian descendants	A colloquial neutral term for Italian descendants of southern Brazil, specially in Rio Grande do Sul	
Groid	United States	Black people	Derived from "negroid".	
Gub, Gubba	Australia	White people	Aboriginal term for white people	
Guiri	Spain	Foreigners	Originally described the supporters of Queen Maria Christina. Now describes White Northern Europeans.	
Guizi (鬼子)	Mainland China	Non-Chinese	Basically the same meaning as the term gweilo used in Hong Kong. More often used when referring foreigners as military enemies, such as riben guizi (日本鬼子, Japanese devils, because of the Second Sino-Japanese War), and meiguo guizi (美国鬼子, American devils, because of the Korean War).	
Guido, Guidette	United States	Italian Americans	Derives from the Italian given name, Guido. Guidette is the female counterpart. Used mostly in the Northeastern United States as a stereotype for working-class urban Italian Americans.	
Guinea, Ginzo		Italian people	Most likely derived from "Guinea Negro", implying that Italians are dark or swarthy-skinned like the natives of Guinea. The diminutive "Ginzo" probably dates back to World War II and is derived from Australian slang picked up by United States servicemen in the Pacific Theater.	
Gummihals	Switzerland	German people	Literally "rubber neck"	
Gusano	Cuba	Cuban exiles after the revolution	Literally "worm"	
Gweilo, gwailo, kwai lo (鬼佬)	Southern Mainland China, Hong Kong, Macau	White men	Loosely translated as "foreign devil"; more literally, might be "ghost dude/bloke/guy/etc". Gwei means "ghost". The color white is associated with ghosts in China. A lo is a regular guy (i.e. a fellow, a chap, or a bloke). Once a mark of xenophobia, the word is now in general, informal use.	
Gyp / Gip		Romani people	Shortened version of "gypsy"	
Gypsy, Gyppo, gippo, gypo, gyppie, gyppy, gipp	United Kingdom, Australia	Egyptian people and Romani people	Derived from "Egyptian", Egypt being mistakenly considered these people's origin.	

== H ==
Ethnic slurs beginning with h
Term	Location or origin	Targets	Meaning, origin and notes	Ref
Habshi	India, Pakistan	People of African descent	Derived from Old Persian حبشی (habašī), which means "Abyssinian". From the medieval period through the British era, the term was used in India and Pakistan to describe Africans who were brought over as merchants, sailors, mercenaries, and enslaved people.	
Hairyback	South Africa	Afrikaners		
Hajji, Hadji, Haji	United States Military	Iraqi people	May also be used to describe anyone from a predominantly Muslim country. Derived from the honorific Al-Hajji, the title given to a Muslim who has completed the Hajj (pilgrimage to Mecca).	
Half-breed	Worldwide	Multi-ethnic people	Métis is a French term, also used in Canadian English, for a half-breed, and mestizo is the equivalent in Spanish, although these are not offensive per se.	
Half-caste	England, Australia	Mixed race (usually between Australian Aboriginal and white people in Australian parlance)	Originally used as a legal and social term.	
Hambaya, hamba (Sinhala: හම්බයා, හම්බ)	Sri Lanka	Muslims in Sri Lanka	From හම්බන්කාරයා (hambankārayā); derived from the Sinhala word for the sampan boats (Sinhala: හම්බන්, hamban) used by seafarers from the Malay Archipelago, from whom Sri Lankan Malays trace partial descent. Its use as an epithet for Muslims (Moors) traces back to the late 19th century colonial period.	
Haole	United States, Hawaiian	Non-Hawaiian people, almost always white people.	Can be used neutrally, dependent on context.	
Heeb, Hebe	United States	Jewish people	Derived from the word "Hebrew."	
Heigui (黑鬼)	China, Taiwan	Black people	Literally means "black ghost" or "black devil", used similarly to English phrases such as nigga or nigger.	
Heukhyeong (흑형)	South Korea	Black people	Korean: Black brother. A Korean ethnic slur sometimes for black people.	
Hevosmies	Finland	Romani people	From hevos- + mies, referring to Gypsy horsemanship.	
Hike	United States	Italian immigrants	Sometimes used with or to distinguish from "Hunk" ("Hunky").	
Hillbilly	United States	Appalachian or Ozark Americans		
Honky, honkey, honkie	United States	White people	Derived from an African American pronunciation of "hunky," the disparaging term for a Hungarian laborer. The first record of its use as an insulting term for a white person dates from the 1950s.	
Honky, honkey, honkie	New Zealand	European New Zealanders	Used by Māori to refer to New Zealanders of European descent.	
Hori	New Zealand	Māori	From the formerly common Maorified version of the English name George.	
Hottentot, Hotnot	South Africa	Khoisans and Cape Coloureds or Coloureds	A derogatory term historically used to refer to the Khoisan people of Southern Africa and their descendants, coloureds. It originated from the Dutch settlers who arrived in the region in the 17th century.	
Houtkop	South Africa	Black people	Literally "wooden head"	
Huan-a, Huana	Taiwan and Southeast Asia	Non-Chinese native people	This word is derogatory because huan-a means "foreigner" which portrays non-Chinese natives as not human. In Taiwan, it carries the connotation of "aborigine". In Indonesia, it refers to non-Chinese native people descended from the many ethnolinguistic groups native to Indonesia commonly known by the term pribumi (e.g., Javanese, Sundanese, Batak, and Buginese).	
Huinca	Argentina, Chile	Non-Mapuche Chileans, non-Mapuche Argentines	Mapuche term dating back at least to the Conquest of Chile.	
Hujaa (хужаа)	Mongolia	Chinese people	Equivalent to the word chink.	
Hun	United States, United Kingdom	German people	(United States, United Kingdom) Germans, especially German soldiers; popular during World War I. Derived from a speech given by Kaiser Wilhelm of Germany to the German contingent sent to China during the Boxer Rebellion in which he exhorted them to "be like Huns" (i.e., savage and ruthless) to their Chinese enemy.	
Hun	Ireland	Protestants and British soldiers	A Protestant in Northern Ireland or historically, a member of the British military in Ireland ("Britannia's huns").	
Hunky, Hunk	United States	Central European laborers	It originated in the coal regions of Pennsylvania and West Virginia, where Poles and other immigrants from Central Europe (Hungarians (Magyar), Rusyns, Slovaks) came to perform hard manual labor in the mines.	
Hurri	Finland	Swedish-speaking population of Finland, Swedish people	Initially used as a derogatory term for the Swedish-speaking minority of Finland, sometimes used as a slur for any Swedish speaker	
Hymie	United States	Jewish people	Derived from the personal name Hyman (from the Hebrew name Chayyim). Jesse Jackson provoked controversy when he referred to New York City as "Hymietown" in 1984. Has also been spelled "Heimie", as a reflection of popular Jewish last names ending in -heim.	

== I ==
Ethnic slurs beginning with i
Term	Location or origin	Targets	Meaning, origin and notes	Ref
Ikey / Ike / Iky		Jewish people	Derived from the name Isaac, an important figure in Hebrew culture.	
Ikey-mo / Ikeymo		Jewish people	Derived from the names Isaac and Moses, two important figures in Hebrew culture.	
Indio / Indito		Indigenous people	Although the term indio is a demonym for the aboriginal populations of the American continent, in some countries it has acquired a derogatory connotation.	
Indon	Malaysia, Singapore	Indonesian people	Clipping of Indonesia.	
Indognesial / Indonesial	Malaysia	Indonesian people	Which similar to "Indon" term mixed with "Dog" and "Sial" (Malay word for "Damn").	
Intsik	Philippines	Chinese Filipino people	Used in Filipino/Tagalog and other Philippine languages. Based on the Philippine Hokkien term, Chinese: 𪜶 叔; Pe̍h-ōe-jī: in chek; lit. 'his/her/their uncle'.	
Inyenzi	Rwanda	Tutsi people	A person of the Tutsi ethnic group in Africa. Literally means "Cockroach" and reportedly derives from how Tutsi rebels would attack at night and retreat, being hard to kill, like a cockroach. Most notably came to worldwide prominence around the time of the Rwanda genocide, as it was used by the RTLM in order to incite genocide.	
Indian Giver	United States	Native Americans	Presumes that when Native Americans give gifts they intend to take them back. It is applied to anyone who does this to paint them as performing an action akin to an "Indian".	
Injun	United States	Native Americans	Corruption of "Indian"	
Inselaffe	Germany	English people, British people in general	Translates to "Island monkey"	
Inu	Japan	Ainu people	Word literally meaning dog in Japanese. Pun of unknown origin, but used to compare the hirsute genetics of Ainu people with the fur coat of dogs. Possibly also has to do with Matagi hunters, who have Ainu ancestry, working with Akita Inu. Usually used pejoratively like bitch, another term comparing people to dogs.	
Itor	Bangladesh	People from the Greater Cumilla region (Cumilla, Brahmanbaria and Chandpur)	The term "ITOR" borrowed from the English acronym for "Information Technology Organiser" was a title given by the British to people from the Tipperah district (now the districts of Cumilla, Brahmanbaria and Chandpur) in the Bengal province due to their quick thinking, cleverness and consistent success. It is now used as slang by Bangladeshis to refer to people from these three districts.	
Itaker	Germany	Italian people	Formerly used as a nickname for Italian soldiers and the since the 1960s as a slur for Italian immigrants.	

== J ==
Ethnic slurs beginning with j
Term	Location or origin	Targets	Meaning, origin and notes	Ref
Jackeen	Ireland	Dublin people	Believed to be in reference to the Union Jack, the flag of the United Kingdom. By adding the Irish diminutive suffix -een meaning little to Jack thereby ¨meaning "Little Jack" and implying "little Englishmen". It was more commonly used to separate those of Anglo-Irish heritage from those of Gaelic heritage. While the term is applied to Dublin people alone today, it was applied in the past as a pejorative term against all city dwellers and not just those in Dublin.	
Jakun	Malaysia	Unsophisticated people, from the Malay name of an indigenous ethnic group.		
Jamet, Jamet kuproy	Indonesia	Javanese people	Jamet stands for Jawa metal (a metalhead Javanese), while kuproy stands for kuli proyek (construction workers).	
Japa	Brazil	Japanese people	Usually an affectionate way of referring to Japanese people (or, more generally, East Asian people), although it may be considered a slur. This term is never censored (as a slur typically would be) when it appears in mass media.	
Jap	United States	Japanese people	Mostly found use during World War II, post-WWII.	
Jap	United States	Jewish women	Usually written in all capital letters as an acronym for "Jewish-American princess," a stereotype of Jewish American women as materialistic or pampered.	
Japie, yarpie	South Africa	White, rural South Africans	Derived from plaasjapie, "farm boy".	
Jareer	Somalia	Somali Bantus	The Somali word jareer comes from a term for "hard" or "kinky" hair and gained ethnic meaning through the East African slave trade and the stigmatization of Bantu peoples.	
Jawir	Indonesia	Javanese people, especially Javanese people with darker skin	Comes from the words "Jawa" and "Ireng" from a Javanese word means black	
Jeet	Worldwide	South Asians (especially Indians), particularly Hindus and Sikhs	An invented term for Indian people, particularly adherents of Hinduism and Sikhism, allegedly originating on 4chan.	
Jerry	Commonwealth	German people, especially soldiers	Probably an alteration of "German". Origin of Jerry can. Used especially during World War I and World War II.	
Jewboy	United States, United Kingdom	Jewish boys	Originally directed at young Jewish boys who sold counterfeit coins in 18th century London.	
Jidan / Jidov / Jidovin(ă)	Romania	Jewish person.		
Jiggaboo, jiggerboo, niggerboo, jiggabo, jigarooni, jijjiboo, zigabo, jig, jigg, jigger	United States	Black people with stereotypical black features (e.g., dark skin, wide nose, and big lips).	From a Bantu verb tshikabo, meaning "they bow the head docilely," indicating meek or servile individuals.	
Jim Crow	United States	Black people		
Jjangkkae	Korea	Chinese people		
Jjokbari	Korea	Japanese people		
Jock, jocky, jockie	United Kingdom	Scottish people	Scots language nickname for the personal name John, cognate to the English, Jack. Occasionally used as an insult, but also in a respectful reference when discussing Scottish troops, particularly those from Highland regiments. For example, see the 9th (Scottish) Division. Same vein as the English insult for the French, as Frogs. In Ian Rankin's detective novel Tooth and Nail the protagonist – a Scottish detective loaned to the London police – suffers from prejudice by English colleagues who frequently use "Jock" and "Jockland" (Scotland) as terms of insult; the book was based on the author's own experience as a Scot living in London.	
Jovenlandés	Spain	Alleged criminal non-European migrants	A term used to refer to young people of foreign origin who appear in news reports, generally as (alleged) perpetrators of crimes, and whose nationality is omitted.	
Jungle bunny	United States, Commonwealth	Black people		
Jutku, jutsku	Finland	Jewish people		

== K ==
Ethnic slurs beginning with k
Term	Location or origin	Targets	Meaning, origin and notes	Ref
Kaew (แกว)	Northeastern Thailand	Vietnamese people		
Kaffir, kaffer, kaffir, kafir, kaffre, kuffar, caffer, caffre	South Africa	Black or Cape Coloured people	From Arabic kafir, meaning "disbeliever".	
Kaffir boetie	South Africa	Black and Cape Coloured sympathizers during apartheid	Meaning "Kaffir brothers", it is analogous to "negro lover" in English. The term is outdated and no longer used.	
Kanglu, Kangladeshi	Bangladesh, India, Pakistan	Bangladeshis	A portmanteu of the words kaṅgāl (meaning poor, broke, pauper) and Bangladeshi. It is used to refer to Bangladeshis, associating them with poverty or immigration issues.	
Kalar	Myanmar	Muslim citizens who are "black-skinned", Bengali, Rohingya or any South Asian Muslim or Hindus or "undesirable aliens."	The word "Kalar" is derived from the Burmese word "ကုလား" (ku.la:). It is a word often used in Myanmar, usually in a negative way to refer to people with darker skin, especially those of South Asian descent (especially Bengalis or Rohingyas) or dark-skinned Muslims and Hindus.	
Kalbit	Russian	Central Asians		
Kalia, Kalu, Kallu	Indian	Darkskinned people	Literally means "blackie", generally used for black-skinned people in India. Can also have a racist overtone when referring to Africans.	
Katwa, Katwe	Indian	Muslim males	Word used to describe Muslim males for having a circumcised penis as mentioned in the Khitan of Islam.	
Kanaka	Australia	Pacific Islanders		
Kanake	German	Turkish people, foreigners in general	Originally used to refer to Native Polynesians. To some extent re-appropriated.	
Kano	Philippines	White Americans	Usually used in Filipino (Tagalog) or other Philippine languages. Shortened from the Filipino word "Amerikano". It usually refers to Americans, especially a stereotypical male white American, which may extend to western foreigners that may fit the stereotype which the speaker is not familiar with, especially those from Europe, Australia, New Zealand, etc.	
Kaouiche, Kawish	Canadian French	Native Americans		
Karghouli (Moroccan Arabic: كرغولي)	Morocco	Algerian people	Often used by the Moorish movement towards Algerians on social media. Derived from the Ottoman Turkish "Kouloughli," a term used during the period of Ottoman influence in North Africa that usually designated the mixed offspring of Ottoman officials and janissaries and local Algerian women.	
Käskopp	Germany	Dutch people	Middle German slur that translates to "cheese head".	
Katsap, kacap, kacapas	Ukraine, Belarus, Poland, Lithuania, Russia	Russian people	Ukrainian: кацап, Lithuanian: kacapas; self-deprecating usage by Russians.	
Kebab		Muslims, usually of Arabian, Turkic or Iranian descent.	Its origin is a Serbian music video that was recorded in 1993 during the Yugoslav Wars but the phrase has spread globally amongst far-right groups and the alt-right as a meme between 2006 and 2008. Famously Turkish internet users parodied the sentiment of Serbian nationalists online, with a satirical incoherent rant that ended with the phrase "remove kebab" being repeated. Although the meme initially intended to parody racism, this meaning behind the meme was lost once it became common in alt-right discourse.	
Keling, kling	Indonesia, Malaysia, Singapore	Indian people	In Indonesian, the term can be applied to any person with dark complexion, not only of Indian descent, but also to native Indonesians with darker complexion and Africans. The term is derived from the ancient Indian region of Kalinga, where many immigrants to countries further east originated.	
Kemosabe / Kemosahbee	United States	Native Americans	The term used by the fictional Native American sidekick Tonto as the "Native American" name for the Lone Ranger in the American television and radio programs The Lone Ranger.	
Kettō (毛唐)	Japan	Westerners	Literally means "foreigners full of body hair". Alternative form: ketōjin (毛唐人)	
Khach (Russian: Хач), Khachik (Russian: Хачик)	Russia	Peoples of the Caucasus, particularly North Caucasus and Armenians	From Armenian խաչ khach, meaning cross (cf. khachkar). Khatchik is also an Armenian given name coming from the same root.	
Kharadim	Israel	Haredi Jews	Blend word of khara (shit in Hebrew) + Haredi	
Kharkhuwa	India	Assamese people		
Khawal	Egypt	Gay people		
Khokhol (Russian: Хохол)	Russia, Poland	Ukrainian people	Derived from a term for a traditional Cossack-style haircut.	
Khom (Thai: ขอม)	Thailand	Khmer people	Derived from Khmer Krom, popularized in the 20th century by Thai pan-nationalists to historically negate the fact that modern Khmer population is descended from the Angkorian Empire.	
Khựa	Vietnam	Chinese people	Variant form of "Tàu khựa"	
Ikula (s.) / Amakula (p.)	South Africa	A person or people Indian heritage.		
Kike	United States	Jews	Possibly from קײַקל kikel, Yiddish for "circle". Immigrant Jews who could not read English often signed legal documents with an "O" (similar to an "X", to which Jews objected because "X" also symbolizes a cross). Also known by the euphemism "K-word".	
Kimchi		Korean people		
Kıro	Turkey	Kurdish men	Originally meaning "son" in Kurdish. In Turkey, one of the pejorative words for referring to Kurds as rude, illiterate and boorish.	
Kitayoza китаёза	Russia	East Asian people, especially the Chinese.	Derived from "kitayets". (Cyrillic: китаец)	
Kkamdungi (깜둥이)	South Korea	Black people	Korean for nigga or nigger.	
Knacker	Ireland	Irish Travelers		
Kojaengi (코쟁이)	South Korea	Westerners	From 코 ("nose") and -쟁이 (derogatory suffix), prevalently used during the 19th and 20th centuries to refer to White foreigners	
Kolorad	Ukraine	Pro-Russian separatists and Russian invaders	In reference to Russian St. George ribbon whose coloration resembles the stripes of the Colorado beetle.	
Kotiya (Sinhala: කොටියා)	Sri Lanka	Tamils	Literally "leopard", though its intended meaning as a slur stems from an erroneous conflation with tigers; in reference to members and (perceived) supporters of the organization Liberation Tigers of Tamil Eelam.	
Koyotl	Mexico	Non-indigenous Mexicans and foreigners	A Nahuatl term for non-indigenous/Mestizo/White Mexicans, foreigners, or those whose lifestyle is considered urban. The word koyotl literally means "coyote," symbolically associated with cunning, adaptability, and, in some contexts, with a predatory nature. In the modern context of Nahua communities, the term has acquired the meaning of "a person who does not belong to the indigenous community" or "who lives according to non-traditional customs," especially in contrast to those who preserve the Nahuatl language and local cultural practices.	
Kozojeb	Serbia	Albanians, Bosnians	Derived from local translations of "goat fucker"	
Krankie	England	Scottish people		
Krakkemut	Denmark	Arabs, Middle Easterners	While originally being used against Greenlanders, it is now mostly used against Middle Easterners and Arabs. The word comes from the Greenlandic word "Qaqqamut" meaning "to the mountain, up the mountain"; however, Danish people began to pick up the word as an aggressive slur, and used it against the Greenlanders, and slowly, it became a slur against the more frequent Arab and Middle Eastern immigrants in Denmark.	
Kraut	United States, Canada, Commonwealth	German people	Derived from sauerkraut, used most specifically during World War II.	
Kūpapa Māori	New Zealand	Māori people	Term used to describe Māori people who cooperate with or who are subservient to white authority figures (similar to "Uncle Tom" qv). From historical Māori troops who sided with the colonial government in the 19th century.	
Kurepi	Paraguay	Argentine people	A Guarani term used in Paraguay to refer to people from Argentina, derived from kure pire, which means "pigskin."	
Kuronbō (黒ん坊)	Japan	Black people	A derogatory that literally means "darkie" or "nigga" in Japanese. The term has been used as a racial slur against black people, particularly during Japan's colonial era.	

== L ==
Ethnic slurs beginning with l
Term	Location or origin	Targets	Meaning, origin and notes	Ref
Labas	Russia	Lithuanian people	Derived from greetings: Latvian labrīt/labdien/labvakar and Lithuanian labas rytas/laba diena/labas vakaras, meaning "good morning/day/evening".	
Land thief	South Africa	White South Africans	The term implies that white people stole land from black people during the Apartheid era, and are therefore responsible for the current economic and social inequalities in the country.	
Landya	India (Maharashtra in specific)	Muslims	Used primarily by Marathi people; the term translates to "small penis", referring to circumcision.	
Lassi	India	Sikhs	A term used against Sikhs in India as offensive to Sikh community, referring to Lassi a traditional yogurt-based drink in Indian subcontinent, drunk mostly in Punjab by Sikh community.	
Laomaozi (老毛子)	China	Russian people	Popularized from Northeastern China	
Lapp	Scandinavia	Sámi people	Used mainly by Norwegians and Swedes. The word itself means "patch." "Lapland", considered non-offensive, refers to Sámi territory known as "Sápmi", Finland's northernmost county, or the province in northernmost Sweden.	
Lebo, Leb	Australia	A Lebanese person, usually a Lebanese Australian.		
Leupe lonko	Chile	German people	Used by some Huilliche people of southern Chile. Means "toasted heads" in reference to the fair hair of many Germans. Originated during the German colonization of Valdivia, Osorno and Llanquihue in the mid-19th century.	
Limey	United States	British people	Comes from the historical British naval practice of giving sailors limes to stave off scurvy.	
Locust (蝗蟲)	Hong Kong	Mainland Chinese people		
Lomn	Ethiopia	Gambellans (Nilotes)	It is an Amharic ethnic slur used by Ethiopian highlanders against Gambellans, who are regarded as outsiders and not truly Ethiopian.	
Londo	Indonesia	White people	Commonly used by Javanese people. Derived from "Belanda" (Netherlands).	
Lubra	Likely derived from a Tasmanian Aboriginal language.	Australian Aboriginal Women		
Lumbard / Lumbart	Italy	Northern Italians	It is a derogatory term directed at Northern Italians, particularly those with independentist or regionalist views. It derives from the Lombard pronunciation of "Lombard" ([lumˈbaːrt]) and serves as a mockery of their language and regional pride.	
Lundy	Northern Ireland	Irish People	A unionist that sympathises the Nationalists in Northern Ireland. The name emanates from Robert Lundy, a former Governor of Londonderry during the Siege of Derry in 1688, who is reviled as being a traitor to Protestants and as such, an effigy of him is burned each year.	
Lugan		Lithuanian people		
Lach / Lyakh (Ukrainian: лях)	Ukraine, Russia	Polish people	Lach is a term that originally referred to a representative of Slav tribes living roughly in what is today eastern Poland and western Ukraine, more commonly known today as Lendians, but later became associated with all Polish tribes. In other languages, Lach and derived expressions are neutral.	

== M ==
Ethnic slurs beginning with m
Term	Location or origin	Targets	Meaning, origin and notes	Ref
Mabuno / Mahbuno	Zimbabwe	Local European people held in contempt, commonly white Africans of European ancestry.		
Macaca	Europe	African people	Originally used by francophone colonists in North Africa, also used in Europe against Immigrants from Africa.	
Macaronar	Romania	Italian people	Roughly means "macaroni eater/maker".	
Madrasi	Northern India	South Indian people	Originally used as a demonym to refer to the people of the Madras Presidency, which included most of South India. Nowadays, the term is used mainly as a slur by some North Indian people against South Indians, and refers to a harmful stereotype of all South Indian people.	
Majus (مجوس)	Arab world	Persian people	A term meaning Zoroastrian, Magi, fire worshipper.	
Maketo	Spain	Non-Basque Spaniards	A Basque word used to describe non-Basque migrants from other parts of Spain who have migrated into the Basque Country, especially those who cannot speak the Basque language.	
Makwerekwere	South Africa	Foreign nationals from other African countries	This term has been associated with discriminatory and xenophobic behaviour, and it played a role in the xenophobic attacks in South Africa in 2008, during which over sixty people were killed and thousands were displaced.	
Malakh-khor (ملخ خور)	Iran	Arab people	Meaning "locust eater," referring to the eating of locusts in Arab cuisine.	
Malau	South Africa	Khoisans and Cape Coloureds or Coloureds	A derogatory Afrikaans slang word derived from Xhosa, used to insult coloured people and Khoisans by suggesting they lack cultural and racial roots and are therefore uncivilized. Its origin can be traced back to the Xhosa word "amalawu" or "ilawu", meaning "Hottentot".	
Malaun	Bangladesh	Hindus	"Malaun" is derived from Bengali মালাউন (maalaaun), which in turn was derived from Arabic "ملعون" (mal'un), which means "cursed" or deprived of God's mercy.	
Malingsia / Malingsial / Malingsialan	Indonesia	Malaysian people	Used in Indonesia, derived from "maling" (Javanese for "thief") and "Malaysia". It often arises due to perceived instances of Malaysia claiming aspects of Indonesian culture	
Malon	Indonesia	Malaysian people	Used as the reply to Indon word. Malon is (mostly) a short for "Malaysia Bloon" (dumb Malaysians).	
Mangal / Mango / Mangasar / Mangusta	Bulgaria	Romani people	From Bulgarian "мангал" (mangal) – a type of pot. Some variants are derived from the similar-sounding loanwords "манго" (mango) – mango and "мангуста" (mangusta) – mongoose.	
Mangiasapone	Italy	Sicilians and other southern Italians	The term literally means "soap eater" and was historically a derogatory label for Sicilians and other southern Italians, reflecting stereotypes of being dirty. According to legend, when northern Italians introduced soap to Sicily during Giuseppe Garibaldi's dictatorship, locals supposedly mistook the bars for bread and ate them.	
Manjo, Manno, Mao	Southwest Ethiopia	People of slave descent or low-status forager groups	In southwestern Ethiopia, Damotic-speaking peoples such as the Kaffa, Dawro, Sheka, and Welega Oromos use slurs like Manjo, Manja or Mao against targeted low-status groups including Komans, South Omotic peoples or hunter-gatherer communities. These terms are rooted in racial stereotypes of darker skin, kinky hair, broader nose, enforcing a caste-like hierarchy where the targeted groups occupy the bottom rung as semi-enslaved serfs, tribute laborers, or equivalents to slaves through historical conquest and occupational exclusion.	
Manne	Finland	Romani men	Possibly from Swedish man or from the name Herman. It refers to Romani men, however can also refer to Romani people generally.	
Marokaki (מרוקקי)	Israel	Moroccan Jewish people	Derived from "Maroko" (Hebrew pronunciation for "Morocco") + "Kaki" (which means "shit", "crap" in Hebrew slang).	
Maruta (丸太/マルタ)	Japan	Chinese people	Originally a term used by Unit 731 referring to its human test subjects, Nowadays used by Netto-uyoku sometimes.	
Mau-Mau	United States	Black people	derived from Kenyans of the Kikuyu tribe involved in the Mau Mau Rebellion in the 1950s.	
Mayate / Mayatero		Black people	Literally the Spanish colloquial name of the Figeater beetle.	
Mayonnaise Monkey	United States	White people	A term commonly used by black people. A person with a "mayonnaise"-like complexion.	
Mick		Irish people		
Milogorac	Serbia	Montenegrins	Deriving from Milo Đukanović (former president of Montenegro), used to refer to Montenegrin nationalists/Montenegrins who do not identify as Serbs.	
Mocro	Dutch	Dutch-Moroccan people		
Mohamedaner	Denmark	Person adherent to Islam	Derived from Muhammad.	
Mof (singular); Moffen (plural)	Dutch	German people		
Momo / Momos	India	Northeast Indians and Nepalese	Based on momos, a dumpling made by northeast Indians, Nepalese and Tibetans.	
Monkey	Europe	Usually people of African, Melanesian, or Indigenous Australian descent.	A universal slur, meaning it has the same meaning in different languages.	
Moro	Spain	Magrebi and Muslims	Originally referring to peoples from the Roman province of Mauritania Tingitana (nowadays the Maghreb), it came to be used for Muslim Maghrebis and Andalusis during the Middle Ages and was later extended to any Muslim person.	
Moskal, Ukrainian: москаль, Polish: moskal, Russian: москаль, German: moskowiter	Ukraine, Belarus, Poland	Russians	Historically a neutral designation for a person from Muscovy, currently refers to Russians.	
Moon Cricket	United States	Black people	The origin is obscure. May refer to slaves singing at night as crickets chirp at dusk.	
Mountain Turk	Turkey	Kurdish people	Former Turkish governments denied the Kurds their own ethnicity, calling them Mountain Turks (dağ Türkleri).	
MTN	South Sudan	Dinka people	This is derived from MTN's slogan, "everywhere you go". It was repurposed to suggest that the Dinka were encroaching on other groups' territory to graze their animals everywhere.	
Muklo	Philippines	Filipino Muslims, notably among Bangsamoro ethnic groups	First used by soldiers of the Armed Forces of the Philippines stationed in Mindanao as an ethnic slur towards the Muslim Moro insurgents.	
Mulignan / Mulignon / Moolinyan	United States	Black people	Used by Italian-Americans. Deriving from "mulignana" the word for eggplant in some South Italian linguistic variants. Also called a mouli.	
Munt	Rhodesia, originally military	Black people, usually men		
Muso giallo	Italy	East Asian people	Literally "yellow muzzle"	
Mustalainen	Finland	Romani people	Literally "blackling," "blackie," "the black people", when "romani" is the neutral term.	
Maxhup	Kosovo	Romani people	Expression of contempt for someone, usually Romani people.	
Mzungu	Eastern and Southern Africa, Democratic Republic of the Congo	White people	May be both pejorative and affectionate, depending on usage.	

== N ==
Ethnic slurs beginning with n
Term	Location or origin	Targets	Meaning, origin and notes	Ref
Namak Haram	Pakistan	Afghans in Pakistan	Derogatory term used for Afghan refugees in Pakistan translating to "traitors".	
Napoli, Napuli	Northern Italy	Southern Italian immigrants	Literally "Naples".	
Nawar	Levant	Romani people	Arab term for Romani people and other groups sharing an itinerant lifestyle.	
Neftenya / Neftegna / Naftenya / Naftegna	Ethiopia/Amharic	Amhara people	Literally means "rifle-bearer", originally referred to Menelik II's Shewan soldier-settlers who colonized southern Ethiopia. It later became an ethnic slur applied to Amharas, casting them as historical oppressors and "gunslingers."	
Němčour, nimchura (німчура), nemchura (немчура)	Slavic languages	German people		
Nere	Bengali Hindus	Muslims		
Niakoué	France	East or Southeast Asian people	A corrupted Vietnamese word with similar to "yokel", "country bumpkin", etc.	
Niglet / Negrito		Black children		
Nig-nog, nog, or Nignog	Commonwealth	Black people	Originally used to refer to a novice – a foolish or naïve person – before being associated with black people.	
Nigger / neeger (Estonian) / neekeri (Finnish) / niger / nig / nigor / nigra / nigre (Caribbean) / nigar / niggur / nigga / niggah / niggar / nigguh / niggress / nigette / negro / neger	International/Worldwide	Black people, especially African-Americans	From the Spanish and Portuguese word negro ("black"), derived from the Latin niger. The Spanish or Portuguese term, or other such languages deriving the term from it such as Filipino, may vary in its connotation per country, where some countries, the connotation may range from either positive, neutral, or negative, depending on context. For example, in Spanish and Portuguese, "negro" may simply refer to the color black. Among Spanish dialects in different countries, it may have either positive or negative connotations, such as describing someone similarly to my 'darling' or 'my honey' in Argentina, or describing someone to be angry in Spain. In Portuguese, the term "negro" is often preferred to the more offensive preto; however, due to the influence of US-American pop culture, the "n-word" can be found in the language as an anglicism, with identical connotations as the English term.	
Niggeritis / Negroitis	Caribbean	Black people	To feel sleepy after eating is referred to in and around the Caribbean as having "niggeritis", a direct allusion to the stereotype of laziness of black Africans.	
Nip	United States, Australia, New Zealand, United Kingdom	Japanese people	Someone of Japanese descent (shortened version of Nipponese, from Japanese name for Japan, Nippon).	
Nitchie / neche / neechee / neejee / nichi / nichiwa / nidge / nitchee / nitchy	Canada	Native Canadians	A Native American (from the Algonquian word for "friend").	
Non-Pri, Non-Pribumi	Indonesia	Indonesians of foreign descent, especially Chinese Indonesians	The term pribumi was coined after Indonesian independence to replace the derogatory Dutch term Inlander ("native"). "Non-pribumi," often simply "non-pri," was then used to refer to Indonesians of foreign descent and was generally considered to suggest that they were not full citizens. Use of both "pribumi" and "non-pribumi" by government departments was banned by President B.J. Habibie in 1998 according to Inpres (Instruksi Presiden, lit. Presidential Instruction) No. 26 of 1998, along with instruction to stop discrimination by race in government.	
Norrbagge	Sweden	Norwegians	A Swedish derogatory slur for Norwegians of uncertain meaning. Some claim that it is based on the root bagge meaning sheep's testicles in some Swedish dialects. Another explanation is that "bagge" refers to Bagaholmen, which is an islet (holme) that sits in the middle of Göta Älv on which Båhus Castle was constructed. If this is the case, "Norrbagge" would mean "people who live on the north (Swedish: norr) side of Bagaholmen".	
Northern Monkey	United Kingdom	Northern English people	Used in the south of England, relating to the supposed stupidity and lack of sophistication of those in the north of the country. See also Southern Faerie.	
Nusayri	Syria and the Levant	Members of the Alawite sect of Shi'a Islam.	Once a common and neutral term derived from the name of Ibn Nusayr, the sect's founder, it fell out of favour within the community in the early decades of the 20th century due to the perception that it implied a heretical separateness from mainstream Islam. Resurgent in the context of the ongoing Syrian civil war, the term is now often employed by Sunni fundamentalist enemies of the government of Bashar al-Assad, an Alawite, to suggest that the faith is a human invention lacking divine legitimacy.	

== O ==
Ethnic slurs beginning with o
Term	Location or origin	Targets	Meaning, origin and notes	Ref
Ofay	African American Vernacular	White people	First recorded in the late 19th century. Origin unknown. Suggestions include Yoruba ófé, "to disappear"; pig Latin for "foe"; and French au fait, "socially proper".	
Oláh	Hungarian-speaking territories	Romanian people	Evolved to a pejorative term, originates from the historical designation of Romanians earlier the 19th century.	
Orc	Ukraine	Russian soldiers	Orc (Cyrillic: орк, romanised: ork), plural orcs (Russian and Ukrainian: орки, Russian romanisation: orki, Ukrainian: orky), is a pejorative used by Ukrainians to refer to an invading Russian soldier during the Russo-Ukrainian War. It comes from the name of the fictional humanoid monsters of the same name from J. R. R. Tolkien's fantasy novel The Lord of the Rings.	
Oreo	United States	Black people	Used as early as the 1960s. Refers to a black person who is perceived as acting white, and therefore black on the outside and white on the inside like an Oreo cookie.	
Overner	United Kingdom, Isle of Wight	Mainland United Kingdom Residents	A term used by residents of the Isle of Wight, sometimes pejoratively, to refer to people from the mainland United Kingdom.	

== P ==
Ethnic slurs beginning with p
Term	Location or origin	Targets	Meaning, origin and notes	Ref
Paddy	United Kingdom	Irish people	Derived from Pádraig/Patrick. Often derogatory; however, the sister of Lord Edward FitzGerald, a major leader of the United Irishmen of 1798, proclaimed that he was "a Paddy and no more" and that "he desired no other title than this".	
Paddy wagon		Irish people	As a reference to a police van, is seen by Irish people as insulting.	
Pajeet	Worldwide	South Asians (especially Indians), particularly Hindus and Sikhs	An invented term for Indian people, particularly adherents of Hinduism and Sikhism, allegedly originating on 4chan.	
Pākehā	New Zealand	New Zealanders of non-Māori origin.	A Te Reo Māori term for New Zealanders with no Polynesian ancestry. The origins of the word is unknown, but there are two common interpretations, "light skin" and "pale, imaginary beings resembling men". It is likely pre-colonial Māori believed Europeans were mythical beings from Māori mythology. The word Pākehā is now commonly used as a word interchangeable with "white" or "European". Language experts and government departments alike do not believe the word has derogatory origins, but some New Zealanders of European decent consider it a derogatory term.	
Paki, Pakkis	United Kingdom, Ireland, Canada, Norway	Pakistanis, other South Asians	A contemptuous term for a person from Pakistan or South Asia by birth or descent, especially one living in Britain.	
Palagi	Pacific Islands	White people	A Samoan term for a white person, found throughout the Pacific islands. Not usually derogatory unless used in reference to a local to imply they have assimilated into Western culture.	
Paleface	Native Americans	White people		
Pancake Face / Pancake		Asian people		
Panchito / Pancho	Spain	Latin American people	From Pancho, a diminutive of the name Francisco specially common in Mexico.	
Papoose	United States, Canada	Native American children		
Paragua	Argentina, Chile, Bolivia, Uruguay	Paraguayans	A play on words involving the shortening of the word "paraguayo" to "paragua," which means umbrella in Spanish. Used mainly in Argentina in a derogatory way.	
Paraíba	Brazil	Northeastern Brazilian people	One of the 9 states in the Northeast Region of Brazil. As a slur, it refers generically to any Northeastern person. Used mainly in Rio de Janeiro, the term is related to the Northeastern immigration of the second half of the 20th century.	
Parsubang / Parsolam	Indonesia (North Sumatra)	Batak people or non-Batak people	Batak Dalle and non-Batak people who refuse to consume pork, canine meat, blood, or alcoholic beverages. All are considered haram in Islam. Parsolam itself is a wordplay of solam/silom/selam, an old epithet for Islam and Muslims.	
Pastel de flango	Brazil	East Asian people	Used mostly to refer to people of Chinese and Japanese origin. Pastel is Portuguese for any pastry and so is used for wonton in Brazil. Flango is eye dialect of frango (Portuguese for chicken) ridiculing Asian pronunciation.	
Paša	Serbs	Bosniaks	Literally meaning Pasha, used by Serbs originated during the Bosnian war to generally mock Bosniak Muslims who wanted keep Ottoman titles and place-names. The modern term is used to refer to old Bosniak men who were pictured in wartime cartoons as being "fat as a pasha."	
Payo	Spain	Non-Romani people	A Caló term for a person who does not possess Romanipen. It usually refers to non-Romanis in Spain.	
Peckerwood	Southern African American people and Upper-class White people	Poor, rural White people		
Peenoise	English-speaking Southeast Asia	Filipinos	Usually used in English or sometimes in Filipino (Tagalog) and other Philippine languages. Compound of pee + noise, likened to Pinoy, the colloquial diminutive demonym for Filipinos. The implication makes fun of their high-pitched voice and tendency to scream when speaking online, especially in online gaming and esports.	
Perker	Denmark	Arabs, Middle Eastern	Portmanteau of "perser" (Persian) and "tyrker" (Turk). The use of it is commonly used towards Middle Eastern immigrants	
Peruca	Argentina, Chile	Peruvians		
Pepper or Pepsi	Canada	French Canadians or Québécois.		
Pickaninny		African American or West Indies child		
Piefke	Austria	Prussians and Germans		
Pikey / Piky / Piker	United Kingdom	Irish Travellers, Romani people, and vagrant lower-class/poor people	19th century on; derived from "turnpike".	
Pindos / Pendos (Russian: Пиндос)	Russia	Americans	Universal disparaging term to refer to all Americans. Related slur terms can refer to the United States ─ such as Pindosiya, Pindostan (Russian: Пиндосия, Пиндостан) and United States of Pindosiya.	
Pilak	Sabahans	Filipinos	Regional word for "silver" or "money". Particularly targets immigrants.	
Pink pig	South Africa	White people		
Plastic Paddy	Ireland	Second-generation Irish people	Someone born and raised outside Ireland to Irish parents, typically speaking with a non-Irish accent, who still considers themselves Irish and may hold an Irish passport.	
Plouc	France	Bretons	Used to mean Breton immigrants that came to Paris and extended to mean hillbillies. The term comes from the prefix "plou" found in many Breton city names and toponyms.	
Pocho / Pocha	Southwest United States, Mexico		Adjective for a person of Mexican heritage who is partially or fully assimilated into United States culture (literally, "diluted, watered down (drink); undersized (clothing)"). See also "Chicano".	
Pocahontas	United States	Native Americans	Refers to a distorted narrative of Pocahontas, a Native American woman, in which the 17th-century daughter of Powhatan who negotiated with the English at Jamestown, married an English colonist and converted to Christianity.	
Polack, Polacke, Polak, Polock		Polish or Slavic people	From the Polish endonym, Polak (see Name of Poland). Note: the proper Swedish demonym for Polish people is polack, and the Norwegian equivalent is polakk.	
Polaco	Spain	Catalan people	Meaning Polish, used as derogatory, because they speak a different and "not understandable" language, widespread in the 1940's making a parallel between occupation of Catalonia by Franco at the end of Spanish Civil War and occupation of Poland by Hitler.	
Polaca	Brazil	Prostitutes	In Brazilian Portuguese the word (meaning "Polish woman") became synonymous to "prostitute".	
Polentone	Italy	Northern Italians	Referring to them as a "polenta eater".	
Pom, Pohm, Pommy, Pommie, Pommie Grant	Australia, New Zealand, South Africa	British	Usually non-derogatory, but may be derogatory depending on context.	
Porch Monkey		Black people		
Porridge wog		Scots		
Portagee	United States	Portuguese people and Portuguese Americans	Slur for Portuguese Americans immigrants.	
Potet	Norway	Ethnic Norwegians	Means "potato" in Norwegian and is mostly used negatively among non-Western immigrants when talking about or trying to offend ethnic Norwegians. Means "light skin like a potato".	
Prairie nigger		Native American		
Prindapan	Indonesia	Indian people	From the city of Vrindavan, popularized in Indonesia as the setting of the Indian animated show Little Krishna which aired in Indonesia during the 2010s.	
Prod	Northern Ireland	Northern Irish Protestants		
Promdi	Philippines	Filipinos from countryside (understood as provinces) who have limited or no knowledge about Metro Manila or other big cities by the time they first arrive	From a pronunciation spelling of English "from the (province)". This term can be offending or stereotypical, as it is often used to make fun of people who first arrive in a big city and wear unfashionable clothes or speak in a rural-like accent, common stereotypes of people coming from the countryside. It is being reclaimed as a symbol of pride. It is often synonymous with the word probinsyano/probinsyana.	
Pshek	Russian	Polish males		

== Q ==
Ethnic slurs beginning with q
Term	Location or origin	Targets	Meaning, origin and notes	Ref
Quashie, Quashi	Caribbean	Black people	Often used on those who were often gullible or unsophisticated. From the West African name Kwazi, often given to a child born on a Sunday.	
Qurumboow	Somalia	Somali Bantus, Black people	Qurumboow is a derogatory Somali slang term that became popular in the 1980s. It refers to people with Negroid features, especially Bantus, and carries a strong undertone similar to the word "nigger." The term is also used to name a species of fish sold by some Somali Bantus, linking the epithet to the stereotype of Bantus being "smelly like fish."	

== R ==
Ethnic slurs beginning with r
Term	Location or origin	Targets	Meaning, origin and notes	Ref
Raghead	Worldwide	Arabs, Indian Sikhs, etc.	Derived from those people wearing traditional headdress such as turbans or keffiyehs. See towel head. Sometimes used generically for all Islamic nations.	
Ramasamy	British-ruled Southern Africa	Indians,	Ramasamy is a common name used mostly by Tamil people. The racially divided southern Africa was inhabited by a large number of indentured labourers from India of whom Tamils were the majority.	
Ranga	Australia, New Zealand	Red-haired people	An abbreviation of oranguatan, which refers to the primate's orange hair color.	
Rascon	Northern Italy	Venetians	It is a derogatory Lombard slur historically directed at poor Venetian migrants in Italy's industrial triangle. The word originally refers to the pumpkinseed sunfish, a low-quality, unappetizing small freshwater fish, and was used metaphorically to mock Venetians as people from marshy or swampy regions.	
Rastus	United States	African Americans	A stereotypical term.	
Razakars	Bengali		Akin to the western term Judas.	
Redleg	Barbados	White people	Used to refer to the islands' laborer-class, given how pale skin tends to burn easily.	
Redneck	United States	White Americans	Applied to working-class white people perceived to be crass, unsophisticated, and reactionary; closely associated with rural whites of the Southern United States.	
Redskin	United States	Native Americans	Often used in the names of sports teams, such as the Washington Redskins, now known as the Washington Commanders. See Native American name controversy.	
Remove Kebab	Serbia	Muslims, usually of Arabian or Turkic descent.	Its origin is a Serbian music video that was recorded in 1993 during the Yugoslav Wars but the phrase has spread globally amongst far-right groups and the alt-right as a meme between 2006 and 2008. Famously Turkish internet users parodied the sentiment of Serbian nationalists online, with a satirical incoherent rant that ended with the phrase "remove kebab" being repeated. Although the meme initially intended to parody racism, this meaning behind the meme was lost once it became common in alt-right discourse.	
Risorse boldriniane / Risorse	Italy	Foregin immigrants	Literally "Boldrini's resources". Used for the first time in 2015 by Matteo Salvini, as a slur for North-African immigrants, who had been unironically called "resources" by Laura Boldrini.	
Rital	France	Italian immigrants	Originally derived from the "R.ital" abbreviation used on the identity papers of Italian immigrants in the early 20th century.	
Rockspider, rock	South Africa	Afrikaners		
Rootless cosmopolitan (Russian: безродный космополит)	Russia	Jews	Soviet epithet, originated in the official parlance, as an accusation of lack of full allegiance to the Soviet Union.	
Rosuke, Roske	Japan	Russians	"suke/ske" is a Japanese general-purpose derogatory suffix.	
Rooinek	South Africa	British people	Slang for a person of British descent.	
Roto	Peru, Bolivia	Chilean people	Used to refer disdainfully. The term roto ("tattered") was first applied to Spanish conquerors in Chile, who were badly dressed and preferred military strength over intellect.	
Roundeye	English-speaking Asians	Non-Asians, especially White people		
Russki, ruski (Polish), Ryssä (Finnish)	United States, Europe	Russians	From the Russian word Русский Russkiy, meaning "Russian".	

== S ==
Ethnic slurs beginning with s
Term	Location or origin	Targets	Meaning, origin and notes	Ref
Safavid	Iraq	Feyli Kurds	Mainly used by higher class Sunni Arabs during Ba'athist Iraq to insult Feyli Kurds for their belief in Shia Islam.	
Sakai	Malaysia	Orang Asli	European and Islamic powers gave both the word and the English term Aborigines pejorative connotations, hinting at the supposed backwardness and primitivism of the Orang Asli	
Sambo	United States	African Americans or black people in general		
Sand nigger, Sandnigger	United States	Arabs or Muslims in general	Mainly used against Muslims due to the desert environment of most Arab countries. Equivalent of dune coon (above).	
Sangokujin (三国人)	Japan	Korean and Taiwanese people	Originally used to refer the various former colonial subjects of the Empire of Japan in the aftermath of World War II.	
Sankadhuudhi / Sankadhuudhe	Somalia	Somali Bantus	Literally translates to "broad nose" or "flat nose"	
Sardegnolo, Sardignolo, Sardignuolo, Sardagnolo	Italy	Sardinian people		
Sarong Party Girl	Singapore	Asian women	Used to ridicule Asian women who exclusively dates, marries, or socializes with White men for ulterior motives (especially for sexual, social status, and monetary purpose).	
Sassenach	Scottish, Gaelic	English people		
Savage	England	Indigenous people, non-Christians	Used to describe a person or people considered primitive/uncivilized. Sometimes a legal term. Targets include indigenous tribes and civilizations in North America, South America, Asia, Oceania, and Africa. US examples include 1776 Declaration of Independence ("merciless Indian Savages") and 1901 Supreme Court DeLima v. Bidwell ruling describing Guam, Puerto Rico, and the Philippines as "savage tribes"	
Sawney	England	Scottish people	Archaic term. Local variant of Sandy, short for "Alasdair".	
Scandihoovian		Scandinavian people living in the United States	Somewhat pejorative term for people of Scandinavian descent living in the United States, now often embraced by Scandinavian descendants.	
Scopa pecore, Scopapecore	Italy	Sardinian people	Sheep shagger	
Schluchtenscheißer	Germany	Austrian people	Translates to somebody defecating in a cave (word-for-word translation: gorge shitter) and alludes to the mountainous landscape of Austria.	
Schvartse, Schwartze	Yiddish or German speakers	African people (in the United States and United Kingdom); Mizrahi Jews (in Israel)	Literally translates to "black".	
Schwartze Khayeh	Ashkenazi Jews	Mizrahi Jews	Literally translates to "black animal".	
Seppo, Septic	Australia, New Zealand, United Kingdom	American people	Cockney rhyming slang (septic), Australian rhyming slang (seppo): Septic tank – Yank.	
Shankella, Shangalla	Ethiopia	Nilotic peoples	began as an exonym for various Nilotic-speaking groups on Ethiopia's western frontier but shifted through centuries of slave raiding and racialized social hierarchies into a pejorative term denoting "black" peoples associated with servility and slavery.	
Sheboon For the river in Belize, see Sibun River.	United States	Black women		
Sheeny / Sheenie	United States	Jewish people	A 19th-century term for an "untrustworthy Jew".	
Sheepshagger	Australia	New Zealanders		
Sheepshagger	United Kingdom	Welsh people		
Shelta	Ireland	Irish Travellers	Derived from siúilta, which means "The Walkers" in Irish.	
Shiksa (female), Sheigetz (male)	Yiddish speakers	Non-Jewish people	From Yiddish שייגעץ (sheygets) from Hebrew שֶׁקֶץ (shékets), 'abomination'.	
Shina (支那)	Japan	Chinese people	The Chinese term "Zhina" was orthographically borrowed from the Japanese "shina". Variant form of this term: Shinajin/Zhinaren (支那人)	
Zhina (支那)	Taiwan, Hong Kong	Chinese people	The Chinese term "Zhina" was orthographically borrowed from the Japanese "shina". Variant form of this term: Shinajin/Zhinaren (支那人)	
Shine	United States	Black people	Derived from shoeshiner, a lowly job many black people had to take.	
Shitskin / Shitlip	North America, United Kingdom	Muslims, Black people	A racial and religious slur hurled at Muslims and other black people as well, for their extremely dark, "shit-colored" skin complexions	
Shiptar	Former Yugoslavia	Albanian people	From misspelled Albanian endonym "Shqiptar".	
Shka i Velikës	Gheg Albanians	Montenegrins from Velika	Derogatory terms for Montenegrins named after the place Velika in Montenegro.	
Shkije	Gheg Albanians	South Slavs, in particular Serbs, Macedonians, Montenegrins, Bosniaks	Derived from the Latin word "Sclavus" or from the Venetian word "Schiavone", which means Slav.	
Shkinulkë	Gheg Albanians	South Slavs, in particular Serbs, Macedonians, Montenegrins, Bosniaks	Same as Shkije but targeted towards women.	
Shkutor; Croatian: Škutor	Croatia	West-Herzegovinan Croatian people	Primarily used to refer to ethnic Croats of Bosnia and Herzegovina, as well as to majority of Croats who are not natives of the modern-day Croatia (i.e. Croats of Hungary, Croats of Vojvodina etc.).	
Shoneen	Ireland	Irish People	Irish Person who imitates English Customs. It means "Little John" in Irish language, referring to John Bull, a national personification of the British Empire in general and more specifically of England.	
Shumo	Guatemala	Indigenous Guatemalans		
Shylock / Shyster		Jewish people perceived as greedy or usurious	From the antagonistic character of Shylock, a Jewish money-lender, in William Shakespeare's play The Merchant of Venice.	
Sí-a-la̍k (死阿陸)	Taiwan	Chinese people	Literally means "damned mainlanders". The homophonic numerical form of this phrase (426) is also frequently used.	
Siamtue (Thai: เซียมตือ, Min Nan Chinese: 暹豬)	Bangkoker (Thai Chinese)	Central Thai people (usually include Mons)	Literally Siamese pig; "low and vile like pigs, easy to fatten and slaughter, easy money"; mostly refers to Central Thais who migrated to Bangkok.	
Sideways vagina/pussy/cooter		Asian women, particularly Chinese women.		
Skinnie		Somalis	Named by American soldiers stationed in Somalia who felt that Somali culture was strange enough to seem "alien", comparing the Somalis to the Skinnies, a race of aliens from the novel "Starship Troopers", which was popular among American soldiers. This term was not related to the famine in Somalia in the 1990's.	
Skip, Skippy	Australia	An Australian, especially one of British descent	Derived from the children's television series Skippy the Bush Kangaroo.	
Skopčák, szkop	Czech republic, Poland	German people	Derived from "kopec" (hill), at a time when ethnic Germans lived in higher regions of Sudetenland. The terms were especially popular when used for Wehrmacht soldiers during World War II.	
Skopianoi	Greece	Ethnic Macedonians	Derived from Skopje, the capital city of North Macedonia.	
Skævøjet	Denmark	East Asian people	Skævøjet, literally meaning "with crooked eyes", is a reference to their appearance.	
Slant, slant–eye		East Asian people	In reference to the appearance of the eyes.	
Slobo	Finland	Russians or Slavs	From the Slavic word sloboda ("freedom") through some means, probably through some form of Russian слобода́ (slobodá).	
Slope, slopehead, slopy, slopey, sloper	Australia, United Kingdom, and United States	Asian people (especially Vietnamese in Australia; especially Chinese in America)	Also slant, slant-eye.	
Snowflake	United States	White people	Mostly used in this context in the 19th and 20th centuries.	
Smoked Irish / Smoked Irishman	United States	Black people	A 19th-century term intended to insult both blacks and Irish but used primarily for black people.	
Somdeang (โสมแดง)	Thailand	North Koreans	Literally "red ginseng" (see also Somkhao).	
Somkhao (โสมขาว)	Thailand	South Koreans	Literally "white ginseng" (see also Somdeang).	
Soosmar-khor: (سوسمار خور)	Persia	Arabian people	Persian for "lizard eater," referring to the eating of lizards in Arab cuisine.	
Sooty	United States	Black people	Originated in the 1950s.	
Southern Faerie, Southern Fairy	United Kingdom	Southern English people	Used in the North of England to refer to someone from the South, alluding to their supposed mollycoddled ways. (see also Northern Monkey.)	
Soutpiel	South Africa	White English speakers	An Afrikaans term abbreviated as "Soutie" and translates as "Salt-penis," it derives from the Boer Wars where it was said that British soldiers had one foot in the United Kingdom, one foot in South Africa, and their penis dangled in the Atlantic Ocean (filled with saltwater).	
Spade		Black people	Recorded since 1928 (OED), from the playing cards suit.	
Spearchucker		African Americans or people of African descent in general	Derived from the idea that people of African descent were primitive.	
Spic, spick, spik, spig, or spigotty	United States	Hispanic people	First recorded use in 1915. Believed to be a play on a Spanish-accented pronunciation of the English word speak. May apply to Spanish speakers in general and originally applied to Italians and Italian immigrants as well.	
Spook		Black people	Attested from the 1940s.	
Squarehead		Nordic people, such as Scandinavians or Germans.	Refers to either the stereotyped shape of their heads, or to the shape of the Stahlhelm M1916 steel helmet, or to its owner's stubbornness (like a block of wood).	
Squaw	United States and Canada	Native American women	Derived from lower East Coast Algonquian (Massachusett: ussqua), which originally meant "young woman".	
Sudaca	Spain, Mexico	Latin American people	In spite of its etymology (sudamericano, "South American"), is a derogative term used in Spain for all Latin Americans, South American or Central American in origin. In Mexico, the term is solely used to refer to people from South America.	
Suedi	Sweden	Swedes	Derived from the Arabic word sūēdī ("Swede"), the term emerged in Swedish multiethnic suburban youth slang and refers to ethnic Swedes. It has mainly been used by immigrant and minority youth communities, often in a mocking or distancing context.	
Svartskalle	Sweden	People with dark hair or dark skin	From svart ("black") + skalle ("skull").	
Svenne / Svenne banan / Svennebög	Sweden	Swedes	A slang form of the word "svensk," meaning "Swede" in Swedish, mostly used negatively among non-Western immigrants when referring to or attempting to offend ethnic Swedes. A related variant combines svenne ("ethnic Swede") with bög ("gay male")	
Szmatogłowy	Poland	Middle Eastern people, Arabs	Polish translation of "Raghead".	
Szwab	Poland	German people	Derived from Swabia. See also: Fritz.	

== T ==
Ethnic slurs beginning with t
Term	Location or origin	Targets	Meaning, origin and notes	Ref
Taffy or Taff	United Kingdom	Welsh people	Originating as a corruption of the name Dafydd (Welsh pronunciation: [ˈdavɨð]) Davy or David, and equivalent of other historic English pejoratives Paddy and Jock. Known since at least the 17th century when life-sized effigies of Welshmen were symbolically lynched in London, and the 18th-century custom of baking "taffies", gingerbread figures made in the shape of a skewered Welshman. The term was later popularized by the old anti-Welsh nursery rhyme Taffy was a Welshman, which stereotyped Welsh people as thieves and criminals.	
Taig (also Teague, Teg and Teig)	United Kingdom (primarily Northern Ireland)	Irish nationalists	Used by loyalists in Northern Ireland for members of the nationalist/Catholic/Gaelic community. Derived from the Irish name Tadhg, often mistransliterated as Timothy.	
Tai Ke	Taiwan	Taiwanese people of lower socio-economic status	Literally means "Taiwan person". Now reclaimed.	
Talebano	Italy	People from Muslim-majority countries	Literally "Taliban", it is used towards people from Muslim-majority countries, regardless of their religion.	
Ťaman	Czech republic	Vietnamese people	Mostly used for Vietnamese merchants, but can be used to refer to any Vietnamese or Asian person.	
Tanka	China	Tanka people	A name for a distinct ethnic group traditionally living in boats off the shore of South China. Originally descriptive ("Tan"/"Tang" is a Cantonese term for boat or junk and "ka" means family or peoples, Chinese: 蜑家; Cantonese Yale: Daahn gā / Dahng gā), the term Tanka is now considered derogatory and no longer in common use. The people concerned prefer to call themselves by other names, such as 'Nam Hoi Yan' (Chinese: 南海人; Cantonese Yale: Nàamhóiyàn; lit. 'People of The Southern Sea') or 'Sui Seung Yan' (Chinese: 水上人; pinyin: shuǐshàng rén; Cantonese Yale: Séuiseuhngyàn; lit. 'People Born on The Waters'), and other more polite terms.	
Tar-Baby	United States	Black children	Also used to refer without regard to race to a situation from which it is difficult to extricate oneself. See tar baby.	
Tàu	Vietnam	Chinese people	Variant form of "Tàu khựa"	
Teabag	South Africa	Black and Cape Coloured or Coloured individuals who have a light skin		
Teapot		Black people	Originates from the 19th century.	
Terrone	Northern Italy	Southern Italian people	Derived from terra, meaning land, ground, or dirt. It is used by some Northern Italians as a derogatory insult directed at people from Southern Italy, especially towards immigrants.	
Terrone del Nord	Northern Italy	Venetian people	Literally "Northern Terrone", used towards Venetian immigrants in Italy's industrial triangle.	
Terrorist	United States	Arabs (and Muslims in general)	Originated from anti-Arab and anti-Muslim sentiments following September 11 attacks and subsequently ISIS attacks.	
Teuchter	Southern Scotland	Northern Scottish people	Used to refer to somebody from the north of Scotland or rural Scottish areas.	
Thambi, thambiya (Sinhala: තම්බියා)	Sri Lanka	Muslims, especially Sri Lankan Moors	From the Tamil word தம்பி (tambi) meaning "younger brother." The anglicization "Tamby" was used to refer to Moors in British Ceylon at the turn of the 20th century.	
Thicklips	United Kingdom	Black people		
Tibla	Estonia	Russian or Soviet people	In widespread use by the Estonian War of Independence, this word was forbidden under the Soviet occupation of Estonia. It may be a shortened corruption of Vitebski, workers from the Vitebsk Governorate during World War I who were seen as dumb. It may also come from the Russian profane addressing "ty, blyad," "ты, блядь" ("you bitch", and the like [a]) or, truncated, "ty, blya," "ты, бля.	
Tiko	Indonesia	Native Indonesian people	Tiko stands for Tikus kotor (Dirty rat). It may also derive from Hokkien 猪哥 (ti-ko), which means "brother of a pig", referring to their majority Muslim heritage.	
Tikur	Ethiopia	Black people	Tikur (Amharic for "black") it functions as a racialized descriptor for ethnic groups historically associated with slavery in Ethiopia and is opposed to qey (Amharic for "red") which refers to the Ethiopians themselves.	
Tim	Scotland	Irish Catholic	The Tim Malloys were an Irish Catholic street gang operating in Glasgow in the early 1900s.	
Timber nigger		Native Americans	Refers to the Native Americans on the East coast living in areas that were heavily forested.	
Timur		Syrian people from Damascus	Refers to the children born of the mass rapes that the Turco-Mongol Tatar soldiers of Timur committed against the Syrian women of Damascus in the Siege of Damascus (1400).	
Ting tong	United Kingdom	Chinese people or East Asians.		
Tinker / tynekere / tinkere / tynkere, -are / tynker / tenker / tinkar / tyncar / tinkard / tynkard / tincker	Britain and Ireland	Lower-class people	An inconsequential person (typically lower-class) (note that in Britain, the term "Irish Tinker" may be used, giving it the same meaning as example as directly below).	
Tinker / tynekere / tinkere / tynkere, -are / tynker / tenker / tinkar / tyncar / tinkard / tynkard / tincker	Scotland and Ireland	Romani people	Origin unknown – possibly relating to one of the "traditional" occupations of Romanis as traveling "tinkerers" or repairers of common household objects.	
Tinker / tynekere / tinkere / tynkere, -are / tynker / tenker / tinkar / tyncar / tinkard / tynkard / tincker	Scotland	Native Scottish people	A member of the native community; previously itinerant (but mainly now settled); who were reputed for their production of domestic implements from basic materials and for repair of the same items, being also known in the past as "travelling tinsmiths", possibly derived from a reputation for rowdy and alcoholic recreation. Often confused with Romani people.	
Toad	United States	Black people	Prison slang.	
Toku-A	Japan	Chinese and Korean people	Literally means "specific Asia", A term used by netto-uyoku referring to the only specific part of Asia with strong Anti-Japanese sentiment in their countries (China and North/South Korea).	
Tonk	United States	Hispanic and Latino people	Comes from the sound someones head makes after being hit with a baton or flashlight. Commonly used by United States Immigration and Customs Enforcement agents.	
Tonto	United States	Native Americans	Native American character in the American television and radio programs The Lone Ranger. Spanish for "Idiot".	
Touch of the tar brush	Commonwealth	White people with suspected non-white ancestry	Phrase for a person of predominantly European ancestry with real or suspected African or Asian distant ancestry.	
Towel head		Turban wearers	Often refers specifically to Sikhs, or Arabs and Muslims—based on the traditional keffiyeh headdress. However, in British English, the term is only used to refer to Arabs. Americans use the term 'rag-head' to apply to wearers of turbans as well, because the cloth that makes a turban could be described as a rag, but in British English the term towel-head solely refers to Arabs because the traditional, Middle Eastern keffiyeh, such as the red and white Saudi one or the black and white Palestinian keffiyeh worn by Yasser Arrafat, resemble the most common styles of British tea-towels – dishcloth in American – while Sikh turbans do not.	
Tumba-Yumba (Russian: тумба-юмба)	Post-Soviet countries	Africans and by extension any culture perceived as uncivilized	From "Mumbo-Jumbo" (Russian: Мумбо-Юмбо).	
Tourk-alvanos (Greek: Τουρκαλβανοσ, "Turco-Albanian")	Greece	Muslim Albanians	Ethnographic, religious, and derogatory term used by Greeks for Muslim Albanians.	
Turco	Argentina, Brazil, Chile	Syrians, Palestinians, Lebanese, Jews, Armenians	Meaning "Turk" in Portuguese and Spanish. The term originated in the late 19th century to refer those who came to Brazil, Argentina and Chile from the Ottoman Empire. Since Jews (both Sephardic and Ashkenazi) frequently occupied the same roles as peddlers as Syrians and Lebanese (who were the majority of those with Ottoman passports in Brazil), they were also called "turcos" in Brazil.There was no relevant immigration of ethnic Turks to Brazil.	
Turčin, Poturčin	Serbs	Bosniaks	In reference to the supposed ambiguity of Bosniaks and their ethnic origins; referring to their acceptance of the Muslim faith as them becoming "Turkified" or "Poturčin"	
Turk	South Wales	Llanelli residents	The origin of this term is uncertain; some theories suggest it due to Llanelli's popularity with Turkish sailors in the late 19th to early 20th century or possibly when Turkish migrants heading for the United States stopped in Llanelli and decided to settle due to there being jobs available. However, most likely it's due to the fact that during World War One there was a trade embargo in place during Gallipoli, but Llanelli continued to trade tin with the Turkish; this led to people from neighbouring Swansea and other surrounding areas referring to them as Turks.	
Turkentrekker	The Netherlands	Turkish people	A combination of the word "Turk" and "kurkentrekker" (corkscrew).	
Turko	Sephardic Jews	Ashkenazi Jews	Ladino word meaning "Turk". The exact history of the term is uncertain, but possibly refers to the Khazar hypothesis of Ashkenazi ancestry.	
Twinkie: Not to be confused with Twink (gay slang).	United States	European Americans, Asian Americans	European Americans with few or no social or genealogical links to an indigenous tribe, who claims to be Native American, particularly a New Age practitioner purporting to be a spiritual leader, healer, or medicine man/woman (see also Plastic shaman). Also an Asian American who has become assimilated into mainstream American culture (See Banana, Coconut, and Twinkie).	
Type C	Malaysia	Chinese people	Type C was another name for USB-C before being used as a slur referring to Chinese people, its proclaimed meaning is 'Type Chinese'.	

== U ==
Ethnic slurs beginning with u
Term	Location or origin	Targets	Meaning, origin and notes	Ref
Ukro-Nazi, Ukronazi, Ukrofascist	Russia	Ukrainians	Label used to link self-identifying Ukrainians during the Russo-Ukrainian War to Nazism, evoke Soviet victory in WWII, and justify Russian atrocities in Ukraine. Russian: укро-нацист, romanized: ukro-natsist, укро-фашист, ukro-fashist.	
Ukrop	Russians	Ukrainians	A disparaging term which means "dill" in Russian, itself derived from "Ukrainian" ↔ Ukrop.	
Uncle Tom	United States	Black people	Refers to black people perceived as behaving in a subservient manner to white authority figures. In South Africa, the term "Uncle Tom" has been used as a derogatory slur against coloreds who were perceived as collaborating with the apartheid regime or being subservient to white people. In South Africa, the use of the term "Uncle Tom" by black people against coloureds or vice versa is considered racist and discriminatory according to the Promotion of Equality and Prevention of Unfair Discrimination Act.	
Unta	Indonesia	Arab Indonesians	Meaning "Camel".	
UPAina / UPAińcy / UPAiniec, UPAinka	Poland	Ukrainians	Portmanteau word Ukraine + UPA (Ukrayins'ka Povstans'ka Armiia) responsible for Volhynia genocide.	
Uppity		Black people	Refers to black people who are perceived as being insolent.	
Ustaša (also spelled Ustaše, plural: Ustaši; anglicized as Ustasha, Ustashe, or Ustashi)	Serbia, and (to a lesser extent) Bosnia, Montenegro, Slovenia	Croatians	Became a derogatory slur used primarily by Serbian nationalists in reference to the Independent State of Croatia and the fascist Ustaša movement during World War II in Yugoslavia. In contemporary Serbia, both politicians and media outlets have used the slur "Ustaše" to negatively refer to Croatia as being a fascist nation, or to the Croatian people as being inherently evil.	
Uzkoglazyj	Russia	Asian people, in particular East and Central Asians.	Narrow-eyed	

== V ==
Ethnic slurs beginning with
Term	Location or origin	Targets	Meaning, origin and notes	Ref
Vanja	Finland	Russian people	Synonym of ryssä, referring to Russians or Slavs broadly.	
Veneco	South America	Venezuelans		
Viting	Sweden	White people	Derives from the Swedish word vit ("white") combined with the diminutive suffix -ing. It developed as Swedish slang in informal speech and is used to refer to white people or ethnic Europeans. The term has mainly been used by minority or non-white speakers.	
Vrindavan, Prindapan	Indonesia	Indian people	Indonesian version of pajeet. Originated from Little Krishna animated series.	
Vucumprà, Vu cumprà, Vù cumprà	Italy	non-European immigrants	It originated in the 1980s-1990s and comes from a mocking distortion of the phrase "vuoi comprare?" ("do you want to buy?"), which street sellers commonly use.	
Vuzvuz	Sephardi and Mizrahi Jews	Ashkenazi Jews	Onomatopoeia of the Yiddish word for "What", which Judaeo-Spanish speaking Sephardi Jews and Judaeo-Arabic speaking Mizrahi Jews did not understand.	

== W ==
Ethnic slurs beginning with w
Term	Location or origin	Targets	Meaning, origin and notes	Ref
Waach	Mexico	Non-Yucatec Mexicans	A Yucatec Maya word used by the inhabitants of the Yucatán Peninsula to refer to non-Yucatec Mexicans, specially migrants who come from other parts of the country.	
Wagon burner		Native American people	A reference to when Native American tribes would attack wagon trains during the wars in the eastern American frontier.	
Wasi'chu, Wasichu	Lakota people, Dakota people	Non-Native white people	Word for a non-Native white person, meaning "the one who takes the best meat for himself".	
West Brit	Ireland	Irish people	Directed at Irish people perceived as being insufficiently Irish or too Anglophilic.	
Wetback	United States	Undocumented immigrants (of mostly Hispanic descent)	Refers to undocumented immigrants residing in the United States. Originally applied specifically to undocumented Mexican migrant workers who had crossed the United States border via the Rio Grande river to find work in the United States, the word's meaning has since broadened to any undocumented person who enters the United States via the southern border.	
White ape, White chimpanzee	Britain, United States	Irish people	Irish people were often portrayed as apes in cartoon and newspaper illustrations and also in conversation, most notably by Charles Kingsley who referred to the Irish as "White chimpanzees" after his stay in County Sligo	
White ears	Nauru	White people		
White interloper		White people	Refers to a white person who becomes involved in a place or situation where they are not wanted or are considered not to belong.	
White nigger, Nigger wop	United States	Southern Italians	From the 1800s, inferring such Italians were not "white" enough to be allowed citizenship.	
White-skinned other	United Kingdom, United States	Red-haired people	Originates from people of Irish descent being categorized in to Other White in the UK Census	
White trash	United States	Poor white people	Common usage from the 1830s by black house slaves against white servants.	
Whitexican	Mexico	White Mexicans	A pejorative term used in Mexico to refer to white-skinned Mexicans who usually have social and economic advantages, and who allegedly "are not aware of the prevailing system of inequalities in Mexico and believe that all Mexican citizens have the same opportunities."	
Whitey		White people		
Wigger / Whigger / Wigga / Whigga (meaning white nigger)	United States	Irish people White people	Used in 19th-century United States to refer to the Irish. Sometimes used today in reference to white people in a manner similar to white trash or redneck. Also refers to white youth that imitate urban black youth by means of clothing style, mannerisms, and slang speech. Also used by radical Québécois in self-reference, as in the seminal 1968 book White Niggers of America.	
Wog	Commonwealth	Dark-skinned foreigners	Any swarthy or dark-skinned foreigner. Possibly derived from "golliwogg." In Western nations, it usually refers to dark-skinned people from Asia or Africa, though some use the term to refer to anyone outside the borders of their own country.	
Wog	Australia	Southern Europeans, Mediterraneans	Usually used to refer to Southern Europeans and Mediterraneans (Italians, Croatians, Greeks, Albanians, Maltese, Macedonians, Turks, Lebanese). It has become reappropriated by the cultures that it is commonly used to describe, but may be considered by some as controversial.	
Wop	United States, Canada, United Kingdom	Italian people	Derived from the Italian dialectism, "guappo", close to "dude, swaggerer" and other informal appellations, a greeting among male Neapolitans.	

== X ==
Ethnic slurs beginning with x
Term	Location or origin	Targets	Meaning, origin and notes	Ref
Xarnego / Xarnec	Spain	Non-Catalan Spaniards	A Catalan term with a meaning that has varied over time, from the son of a Catalan person and a non-Catalan, especially a French one, to a Spanish-speaking person living in Catalonia, a Spanish-speaking immigrant in Catalonia or a person whose language is Spanish and who has not linguistically adapted to Catalan.	
Xiǎo Rìběn	China	Japanese people	Literally translated, it means "little Japan". It is often used with "guizi" or ghost/devil, such as "xiao Riben guizi", or "little Japanese devil".	
Xing Ling	Brazil	Chinese people	Chinese products or low-quality products in general. Sometimes used to refer to Chinese people as well. Etymologically, this term is said to be derived from Mandarin 星零 xing ling ("zero stars").	

== Y ==
Ethnic slurs beginning with y
Term	Location or origin	Targets	Meaning, origin and notes	Ref
Yanacona	Chile	Mapuche people	Term used by modern Mapuche as an insult for Mapuches considered to be subservient to non-indigenous Chileans, "sellout." Use of the word "yanacona" to describe people have led legal action in Chile.	
Yaposhka	Russia	Japanese people	Derived from "yaponets" (Cyrillic: японец)	
Yellow		Asian people	An East or southeast Asian person, in reference to those who have a yellowish skin color.	
Yellow		Mixed Ethnic people	Anyone of mixed heritage, especially black or white people; a light-skinned black person, or a dark-skinned white person.	
Yellow bone / High yellow	United States	A light-skin black person Equivalent of yellow (above).		
Yid		Jewish people	Derived from its use as an endonym among Yiddish-speaking Jews. In the United Kingdom, "yid" is also used to refer to supporters of the Tottenham Hotspur football club, whose fans refer to themselves and players as "yids" (or the derivative form "yiddo"), regardless of whether or not they are Jewish, as part of a reclamation attempt centered around the club's significant historic Jewish following. The latter sense is common and well-established enough to be found under the word's Oxford English Dictionary entry, though its use has become controversial and a matter of debate in the 21st century, with opinions from both Jews and non-Jews, Tottenham fans and non-fans, running the gamut.	
Yuon	Cambodia	Vietnamese people	The Khmer word "yuon" or "youn" (yuôn) យួន /juən/ comes from the Chinese 越, in modern times pronounced "Yue". The same character is the root of the "Viet" in "Vietnam". During the Khmer Rouge era, a folk etymology was pushed that placed the term yuon as being descended from the Sanskrit "Yavana", which initially referred to the Ionians but later referred to Greeks in general and later foreigners. The folk etymology was used to push the narrative that Khmer and Kinh people have always been enemies.	

== Z ==
Ethnic slurs beginning with z
Term	Location or origin	Targets	Meaning, origin and notes	Ref
Žabar	Slovenia, Croatia, Serbia	Italians	It is a Serbo-Croatian/Slovenian derogatory term meaning "frog-eater" or "frog-catcher," from žaba (frog). Originally applied to northern Italians, it later extended to all Italians (especially during WWII).	
Zanj, Zang, Zenj, Zinj, and Zang	Persian and Arabic	Black people	Zanj Rebellion	
Zip / Zipperhead	United States	Asian people	Used by American military personnel during the Korean War and Vietnam War. Also used in the films Apocalypse Now (1979), Platoon (1986), Full Metal Jacket (1987), Romeo Must Die (2000), Gran Torino (2008), and Premium Rush (2012).	
Zuca / Brazuca	Portugal	Brazilians	Short for Brazuca, derived from "Brasil", used by Portuguese people to refer to Brazilians living in Portugal.	
Zhyd, zhid, zhydovka, zhidovka	East Slavic language speakers	Jewish people	Originally neutral (as in other Slavic languages), but became pejorative as debate over the Jewish question and the antisemitism in the Russian Empire intensified in the end of the 19th century. While still in official use during the Ukrainian War of Independence and the short-lived Belarusian Democratic Republic, its use was banned by the Soviet authorities, which had previously been campaigning against its usage, in the 1930s. The usage of the word "żyd" in Polish depends on capitalisation and grammatical form: upper-case Żyd is neutral and denotes Jews in general or Jews as a nationality; the lower-case form (żyd, plural: żydzi) denotes a follower of Judaism; both are neutral. Related terms are considered offensive: alternative plural "żydy" or diminutive "żydek" (plural: żydki).	
Zingaro	Italy	Romani people		

== See also ==
- Category:Sex- and gender-related slurs
- Fighting words – Speech or writing intended to incite hatred or violence
- Graphic pejoratives in written Chinese
- Hate speech – Speech that expresses hatred towards individuals or groups
- LGBT slang – Slang used mostly among LGBTQ people
- List of disability-related terms with negative connotations
- List of ethnic group names used as insults
- List of ethnic slurs and epithets by ethnicity
- List of racist idioms
- List of regional nicknames
- List of religious slurs
- List of terms used for Germans
- Lists of pejorative terms for people
- Pejorative – Derogatory or discriminating term.
- wikt:Appendix:English terms for outsiders
- wikt:Category:English ethnic slurs
- Wiktionary category: English derogatory terms
- Xenophobia – Fear and dislike of that which is perceived to be foreign or strange
  - Xenophobia and racism related to the COVID-19 pandemic
  - Xenophobia in the United States
