= Walter Downing =

Walter Downing may refer to:

- Walter T. Downing, American architect
- W. H. Downing (Walter Hubert Downing), Australian soldier, lawyer and writer

== See also ==
- Walt Downing, American football player
