= Long Ranger =

Long Ranger may refer to:

- Bell 206L LongRanger, a stretched variant of the Bell 206 JetRanger helicopter
- Long Ranger, a multiplayer class in the video game Conker: Live & Reloaded

== See also ==
- Lone Ranger (disambiguation)
- Long range (disambiguation)
