= Kharkhuwa =

Kharkhuwa or Kharkhowa (Assamese: খাৰখোৱা) is an Assamese term which is used to signify a person necessarily having Assamese ethnicity and a descendant of people of medieval Assam, now a territory of India.

The word Kharkhuwa has found its use extensively in Assamese satirical ( but sometimes even in serious) pieces of writing and in common parlance to signify native and indigenous commoners of Assam, often referring to or addressing them in a derogatory manner but never being offensive in any way. In fact, this word is a privileged term, loved to be used by a person referring his or her own self with pride for being a native Assamese-speaking commoner.

== Meaning ==
The term Kharkhuwa is a composite word consisting of Khar (meaning alkali) and Khuwa ( meaning to eat or one who eats). Although Khar means alkali i.e. opposite to acid, in Assamese cuisine Khar is also the name of a dish (which is probably unique to the Indian state of Assam) prepared from natural sources of alkali like unripe papaya, bheem kol (botanical name : Musa bulbasiana ) etc. . Thus the literal meaning of the term Kharkhuwa is the one who eats khar . Grammatically, Kharkhuwa can be used both as noun and adjective. While using as an adjective, the word Asomiya ( i.e. Assamese) shall necessarily immediately follow. ( e.g. Kharkhuwa Asomiya).

== Historical significance of the term Kharkhuwa: using alkali instead of salt ==
The genesis of the popular term kharkhowa in Assamese signifying native and indigenous commoners of Assam is due to the fact of extensive use of Alkaline dish of Khar by these people since medieval ages in its cuisine instead of salt because salt was very precious in Assam in those days. The supply of rock salt used to be coming from the Naga and Mishimi hill tribes of eastern territories who in turn collected it from the hills there. However frequent wars in the political fronts among royalty of Assamese and Naga territories almost regularly disturbed such supply leading to crisis of this commodity. Only influential people & aristocrats could afford to possess salt. The commoners had to be satisfied with home-made crude alkaline substances instead of salt. Thus derogatory use of the term Kharkhuwa can be attributed to these circumstances separating the commoners from the aristocrats of medieval Assam. A popular Assamese adage "lune... sune samaan" meaning Lun (Salt) and Sun (Gold) are equal also signified that salt used to be very costly and thus had to be substituted with Khar by majority people in the lower strata of economy.

As time changed, the kingdoms and royalty, the aristocracy disappeared; abundant supply of salt from other sources of various regions arrived and became easily available to all. However, use of Khar in the Assamese cuisine becomes permanent and so thus the use of the term Kharkhuwa still persists signifying a characteristic food habit of native Assamese people. –Scientific reason behind for use of Alkali Assam is land of hills and rivers its environment is very pleasant. But due to the high Humidity in the air the leaf of trees, vegetable etc won't dry easily and all become perished, produce acidic substance and mixed with soil . So whatever grow in the soil all have a higher level of acidity and in the process people become acidic easily whenever agricultural product we consumed, and to reduce or flush out the acidic substance from body, people of Assam frequently uses alkali (Khar) and various types of alkali dishes (Kharor Aanjaa) traditionally from the ancient time or from time immemorial

== Use of the term Kharkhuwa to signify Assamese solidarity ==
The privilege of being addressed as Kharkhuwa can be claimed, due its historical significance, by a descendant of people of medieval Assam, now a territory of India. Although at present, the fact whether one's forefathers were commoners or aristocrats of medieval Assam is something of less significance and often indistinguishable, the satirical use of the term Kharkhuwa addressing a fellow native Assamese or on oneself, equating oneself with rest of fellow Assamese natives, signifies an underlying sense solidarity which is not at all derogatory or offensive in any way. Technically, recent immigrants from rest of India or outside into the territory of Assam, whose forefathers actually did not have to survive in the times of ordeal of being content with Khar instead of salt, are not Kharkhuwa in its true sense.
