= Lone Ranger (disambiguation) =

The Lone Ranger is the protagonist of an American media franchise of the same name.

Lone Ranger or The Lone Ranger may also refer to:

== People ==
- Bass Reeves (1838–1910), law enforcement officer colloquially referred to as the "real lone ranger"
- Lone Ranger (musician), Jamaican reggae DJ who released nine albums between 1977 and 1985

== Radio, film, television ==
- The Lone Ranger (serial), a 1938 Republic film serial
- The Lone Ranger Rides Again, a 1939 Republic film serial
- The Lone Ranger (TV series), a 1949–1957 television series
  - the nickname for actor Clayton Moore, who played the character in the series
- The Lone Ranger (1956 film), a feature film based upon the television and radio show
- The Lone Ranger and the Lost City of Gold, a 1958 feature film
- The Lone Ranger (1966 TV series), a Saturday morning cartoon series launched in 1966
- The Tarzan/Lone Ranger Adventure Hour, a 1980s animated television series
- The Legend of the Lone Ranger, a 1981 feature film
- The Lone Ranger (2003 film), a television film that was an unsuccessful series pilot for The WB Television Network
- The Lone Ranger (2013 film), a feature film directed by Gore Verbinski
- "The Lone Ranger" (L.A.'s Finest), a 2020 second season episode of L.A.'s Finest

== Music ==
=== Songs ===
- "The Lone Ranger", a 1976 song by British band Quantum Jump which reached UK No. 5 on its 1979 reissue
- "The Lone Ranger", a 1996 song by George Jones from the album I Lived to Tell It All

=== Albums ===
- Lone Ranger (Jeff Watson album), a 1992 album by guitarist Jeff Watson
- The Lone Ranger (album), a 1995 album from British singer Suggs
- The Lone Ranger (soundtrack), a 2013 soundtrack from The Lone Ranger 2013 film

== Other uses ==
- Striplin Lone Ranger, ultralight aircraft
- The Lone Ranger and Tonto Fistfight in Heaven, a 1993 collection of interconnected short stories
- The Lone Ranger (video game), a 1991 video game
- Loneranger Productions, a TV and film production company co-founded by Vikram Bhatt

== See also ==
- Long Ranger (disambiguation)
