= Hunky (ethnic slur) =

Ethnic slur

Hunky, Hunyak is an ethnic slur used in the United States and Canada to refer to immigrants of Hungarian or Slavic descent. It originated in the coal regions of Pennsylvania and West Virginia, where immigrants from Central Europe (Hungarians (Magyar), Polish people, Romanians, Czechs, Slovaks, Rusyns, Ukrainians, Slovenes, Serbs, Croats) came from the Austro-Hungarian Empire to perform hard manual labor in the mines. They were called "hunkies" by the American public, which lumped them together into a category of Slavic immigrants, irrespective of their individual ethnic background. The term as an ethnic slur has fallen into disuse, but the term hunky and the public image associated with it has historic relevance in the perception of Slavic immigrants in the United States. There is some usage of the term in other forms; for example, in regions of Pennsylvania, any mill worker may sometimes be referred to as a mill hunky. Another version of Hunky is Hunyack/Hunyak, coming from contraction of Hungarian and pejorative word Polack - for people of Polish origin.

== History ==
The terms hunky and bohunk can be applied to various Slavic and Hungarian immigrants who moved to America from the Austro-Hungarian Empire. The immigrants came en masse prior to the turn of the twentieth century (starting around 1880) seeking opportunity. The Hunkies' image was a departure from Hungarian prestige that peaked around Lajos Kossuth's visit in 1851–1852, aka Triumphal Tour.

The overwhelming majority of these economic immigrants (initially 85%, later 65%) consisted of young working age men. Originally they planned to spend only a few years in America, and then return to Hungary with enough capital to transform themselves into independent farmers or self-employed artisans. This was precisely the reason why, instead of moving into agriculture in line with their traditions, they went to work in the coal mines and steel mills. Only in heavy industry did they have a chance to collect enough money to be able to fulfill their goals back in the Old Country.

== Image ==
Slavic immigrants settled in highly industrial areas and shaped the culture of certain towns and cities. Native residents referred to them as hunkies, and in areas of Pennsylvania, Ohio, and West Virginia. Many Slavic-Americans do not identify with the term and take offense, whereas others are proud of their heritage and the culture their immigrant ancestors created and do not consider the term offensive.

In 1990, artist Luis Jimenez made a 15-foot fiberglass statue and named it "Hunky – Steel Worker", and the sculpture was chosen to be among the hallmarks of that year's Three Rivers Arts Festival in Pittsburgh. The title was protested, saying the word "Hunky" was a slur, and the protest was joined by local politicians. Jimenez said the title was meant to honor the history of low-wage laborers in Western Pennsylvania, but gave his approval to have the word "Hunky" sandblasted off, so the title became simply "Steel Worker".

In 2009, Hunky Blues – The American Dream, a film by Péter Forgács, premiered at the Museum of Modern Art, New York, and National Gallery, Washington, D.C. Forgács, a Hungarian filmmaker, composed the poetic documentary exploring the fate of the hundreds of thousands of Hungarian men and women who immigrated to the United States between 1890 and 1921. Forgács constructed the film from segments of early American cinema, found footage, photographs, and interviews. The film considers difficult moments of arrival, integration and assimilation, and the pursuit of the immigrants and their descendants toward achieving the American Dream.
