= Veneco =

Derogatory term referring to Venezuelans

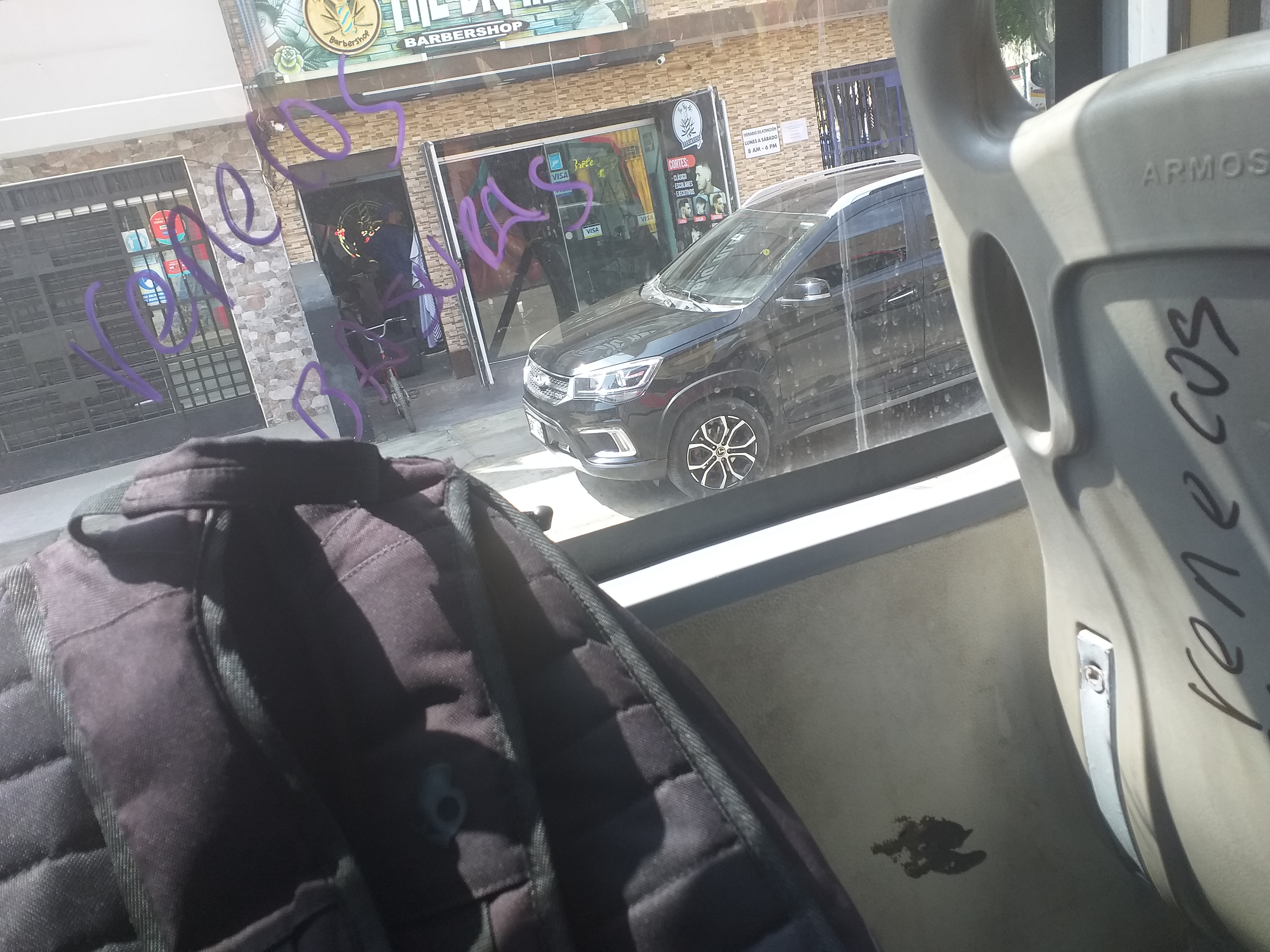
Graffiti on a bus window that says "venecos basuras" (trash Venezuelans) in Lima

Veneco is a derogatory term to refer to Venezuelans. With the worsening of the crisis in Venezuela on June 2, 2010, and the subsequent start of the Venezuelan refugee crisis, its use spread to other Latin American countries. However, in recent years it has been the subject of linguistic reappropriation by members of the Venezuelan community.

== Theories on the origin of the term ==
There are several theories on the origin of the term 'veneco'. The first one refers to an insulting way that Colombians would have to address Venezuelans, being an abbreviation of the expression: "venezolano coño (d)e su madre". This theory is questionable, since this expression is typical of Venezuela, not Colombia.

The second places the origin of the term in the time of Venezuela's oil boom. At that time it was used by Venezuelans to refer to Colombian immigrants who settled in the country and their descendants, being a fusion between 'Venezolano' and 'Colombiano' and over time its meaning changed to refer to Venezuelans.

== Derogatory use ==
While in Colombia the term might not be insulting and may even be affectionate, most Venezuelans agree that it is potentially offensive.

In 2010, the Royal Spanish Academy registered it in its dictionary of Americanisms as a derogatory and popular way of referring to everything related to Venezuela. In 2018, the public institution said in response to a query made by a user: "you will know better if it is used in your area with that nuance or not."

In 2017, the Academia Venezolana de la Lengua stated that "it is a derogatory way of referring to Venezuelans in Colombia," but that "it is not exactly an insult" but rather a sarcastic way of referring to the Venezuelan nationality.

With the worsening of the crisis in Venezuela and the subsequent start of the refugee crisis in the country, the use of the term spread, in its strictly derogatory sense, to other Latin American countries.

== Reapropiation ==
Since around 2019, the term began to be reappropriated by Venezuelans, in the same way "queer" by the LGBT community.

== See also ==
- Reappropriation – Valuing a formerly pejorative term in esteem
- List of incidents of xenophobia during the Venezuelan refugee crisis
