= Chonky (slang) =

Internet slang for chubby but cute animals

Chonky is an adjective internet slang usually for describing animals that are fat, plump or chubby, especially in an adorable and pleasant way. The word is commonly used for adorably fat cats and other animals that are perceived as "cute". The word is also used for just describing big or large in objects. Chonker is a word used for animals that fit the description of the chonky word.

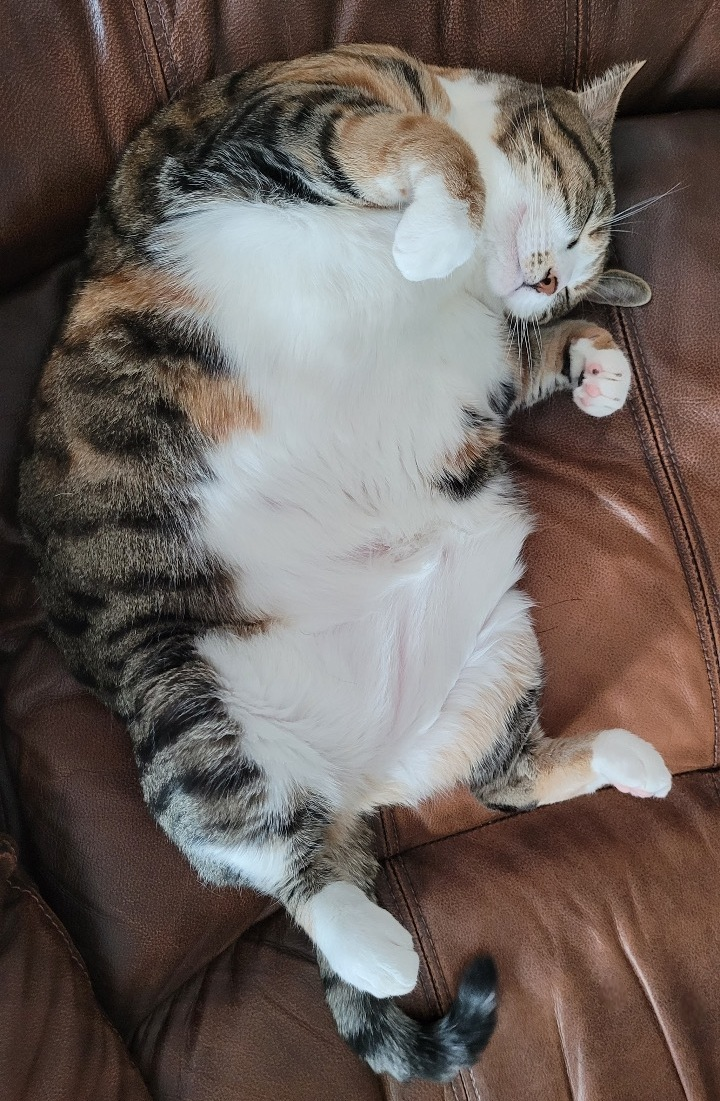
A chonky cat sleeping.

According to Grace Kao from The Korea Herald, the word likely originates from the word "chunky" and the word is used more by women rather than men. The word likely comes from an old meme that pictured a body condition scale of a cat that ranged from "a fine boi" to "OH LAWD HE COMIN" and later got popularized but the word has roots from the old internet in 2004 in platforms like Facebook and YouTube.

== In social media ==
The Instagram account "Chonky Animals" has more than 409,000 followers with the "Round Boys" and "Round Animals" accounts having more than 455,000 and 487,000, respectively. The Facebook group "This Cat Is Chonky" has gathered more than 850,000 members since its launch in May 2018.

== Health concerns ==
According to the Schwarzman Animal Medical Center, obese or fat cats can have huge health consequences if they gain way too much weight or overfed. Labrador Retrievers are one of the top dog breeds to suffer from obesity or being chonky. Too much weight on chonky pets can even develop to kidney disease, heart disease, high blood pressure, breathing problems, diabetes, back problems, cancer, or more.
