= The Australian National Dictionary =

Dictionary of Australian English

The Australian National Dictionary: Australian Words and Their Origins is a historical dictionary of Australian English, recording 16,000 words, phrases, and meanings of Australian origin and use. The first edition of the dictionary, edited by W. S. Ramson, was published in 1988 by Oxford University Press; the second edition was edited by Bruce Moore at the Australian National Dictionary Centre and published in 2016.

== History ==
The first lexicographer to attempt systematic documentation of Australian English words was E. E. Morris, whose Austral English was published in 1898. The next significant works on Australian words were Sidney Baker's The Australian Language (1945) and G.A. Wilkes' Dictionary of Australian Colloquialisms (1978).

=== First edition ===
Work on the Australian National Dictionary Project was undertaken from the late 1970s by W. S. (Bill) Ramson (1933–2011) at the Australian National University. Ramson was motivated by a lack of lexicographic work on Australian English on historical principles, in the tradition of the Oxford English Dictionary. The project gained funding from Oxford University Press and the first edition of the Australian National Dictionary was published by Oxford in 1988, coinciding with the bicentenary of Australia's settlement. It was the first comprehensive, historically based record of the words and phrases that make up the Australian contribution to the English language. It records the historical development of Australian words, phrases and meanings from their earliest use to the present day, providing evidence of this history in dated and referenced quotations drawn from over 9,000 Australian sources. The trials and tribulations of this process are outlined in Ramson's book Lexical Images (OUP, 2005).

=== Australian National Dictionary Centre ===
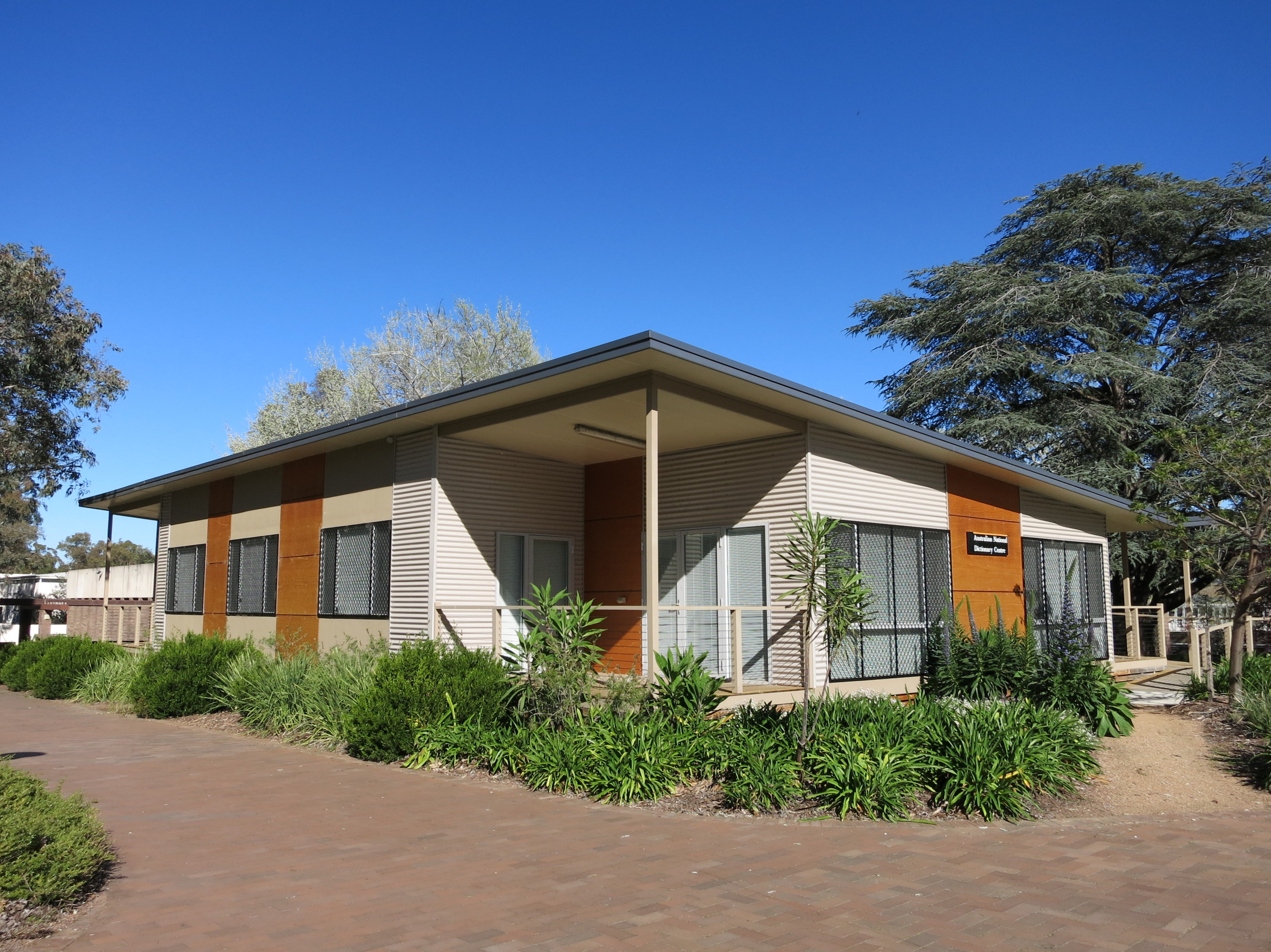
The building that housed the Australian National Dictionary Centre from 2009 to 2017

The Australian National Dictionary Project became the Australian National Dictionary Centre in 1988, with the signing of a contract between Oxford University Press and the Australian National University. W. S. Ramson was the Centre's first director (1988–1994).

=== Second edition ===
The second edition of the Australian National Dictionary (2016) was edited by Bruce Moore, Director of the Centre 1994–2011. It is an expanded work in two volumes, recording the history of 16,000 Australian words, phrases and meanings. Greater emphasis is given in this edition to many new terms deriving from Aboriginal languages and culture to colloquial idioms and phrases, to regionalisms, and to Aboriginal English.

== Publications ==
- First edition (1988, ISBN 0-19-554736-5): includes 10,000 Australian terms, with 57,000 dated and referenced quotations.
- Second edition (2016, ISBN 978-0-19-555026-9): includes 16,000 Australian terms, with 123,000 dated and referenced quotations.

- 1st impression (2016-12-06)
