= W. H. Downing =

Walter Hubert Downing (10 December 1893 – 30 October 1965) was an Australian soldier, lawyer and writer. He wrote extensively on his wartime experiences, but is perhaps best remembered for his book Digger Dialects, a survey of the argot of Australian soldiers serving in Europe during the First World War.

== History ==
Downing was born in Portland, Victoria, a son and one of seven children of bank clerk and one-time pastor John Downing (died 1939) and Cecilia Downing, née Hopkins (1858–1952), prominent member of Woman's Christian Temperance Union, Travellers' Aid Society of Victoria, the Baptist Women's Guild, Melbourne Ladies' Benevolent Society and Victorian Baptist Women's Association, and others.

Downing was educated at local state schools and Scotch College, then the University of Melbourne, where he studied Law, interrupting his career in 1915 to enlist in the First Australian Imperial Force. He served in the 57th (Victorian) battalion in France and Belgium and was awarded the Military Medal in recognition of his conduct and leadership. (Note: Mrs Bishop was a sister, living in Adelaide.) He returned to Australia in 1919 by the Balmoral Castle, and resumed his university studies, living at Queen's College, completing the course in 1920.

In early 1921, Downing took up a position at Tulagi, Solomon Islands, as secretary to F. B. Phillips, Commissioner of Lands in the Solomons, so was absent for the presentation of his LLB. The tropical climate did not agree with him however, and he was living at Clifton Hill when he applied to the Board of Examiners to practise as barrister and solicitor in the Supreme Court of Victoria; he was admitted on 3 October 1921. He joined with Hylton Ernest Williams in the firm of Downing & Williams, with offices in Collins Street, dissolved October 1928. He was a partner with H. E. Elliott in the 1920s. Elliott died in 1931, but his name was perpetuated in the firm of H. E. Elliott, Downing and Oldham in Collins Street in the 1930s and in H. E. Elliott and Downing, with offices in Queen Street in the 1940s.

== Writing ==
Downing was assistant editor of Melbourne University Magazine (MUM) in 1913, and in 1919 edited a magazine published on the Balmoral Castle taking soldiers back to Australia, then was elected by the SRC as editor of the MUM. He wrote several articles for The Herald on the Fleurbaix and Polygon Wood campaigns, published to coincide with their anniversaries. These and other essays were collected and published in 1920 as To the Last Ridge, with a foreword by Elliott. In 1921 that book was awarded the University of Melbourne's Dublin Prize.

== Personal life ==
On 11 May 1929, Downing married Dorothy Louise Hambleton; they had four sons.

== Works ==
- Fleurbaix, a Sepulchre of Heroism (July 1919) ". . . finest pieces of sheer literature that Australian heroism . . .", and
- Polygon Wood (September 1919), article both first published in The Herald.
- Digger Dialects (1919), collection of sayings invented by Australian servicemen overseas. A recent edition, with notes by J. M. Arthur and W. S. Ramson, was published by Oxford University Press (1990) ISBN 0195532333.
- To the Last Ridge (1920) (2002) ISBN 9781904010203, a collection of essays, including "Fleurbaix" and "Polygon Wood". A recent reprinting received glowing reviews.
