= Australian National Dictionary Centre =

National University in Canberra

Coordinates: 35.2782°S 149.1223°E

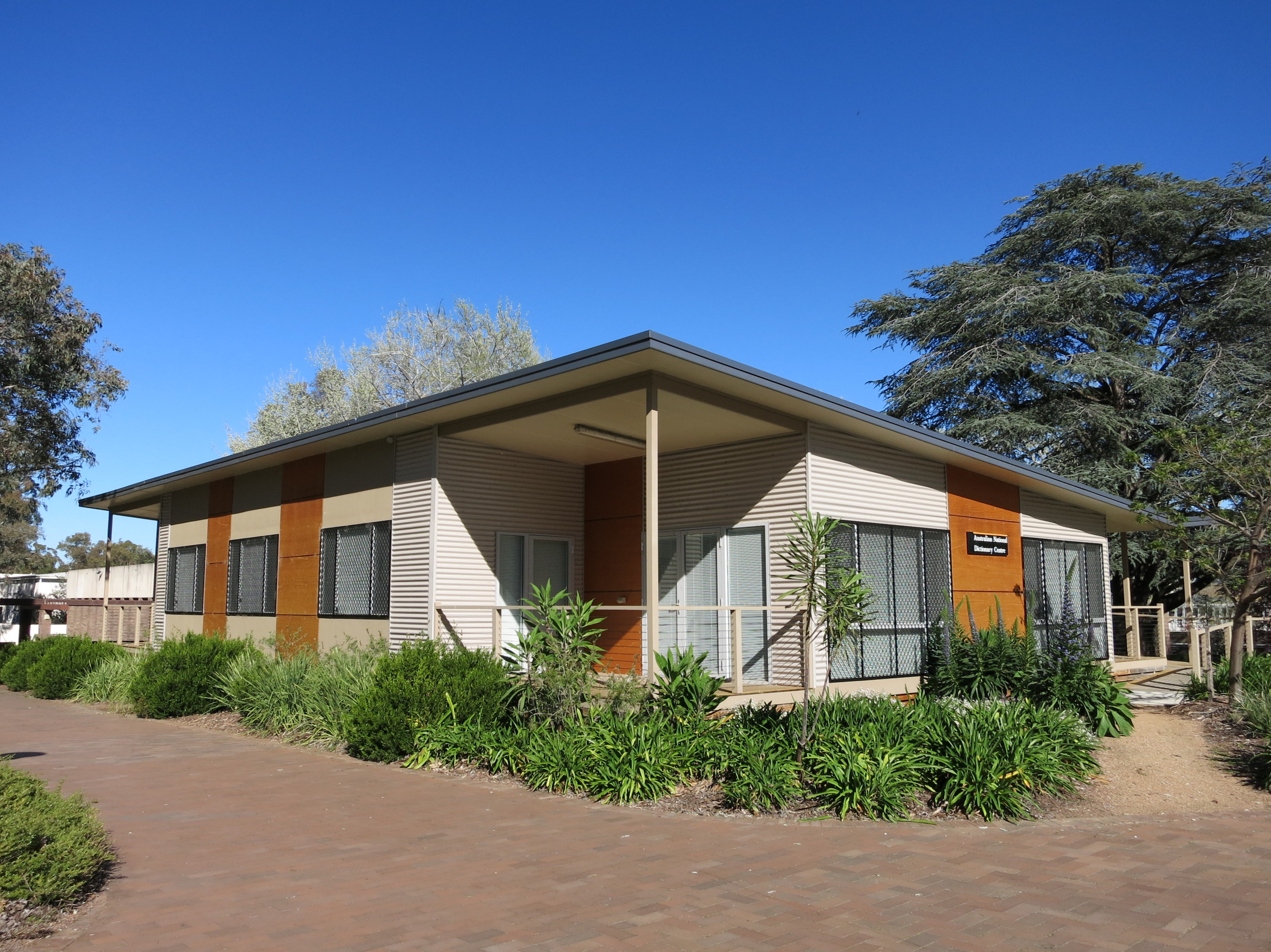
The building that housed the Australian National Dictionary Centre from 2009 to 2017

The Australian National Dictionary Centre (ANDC) at the Australian National University in Canberra is a major centre for lexicographical research in Australia. It is jointly funded by the Australian National University (ANU) and Oxford University Press Australia and New Zealand. The Centre conducts research into Australian English and provides Oxford University Press with editorial expertise for its Australian dictionaries. In 2025, it was announced that ANU would be shutting down the centre as part of its controversial Renew ANU money saving plan.

== History ==
The founding director of the Australian National Dictionary Centre, W. S. (Bill) Ramson (1933–2011), was one of several researchers and academics in the 1970s who saw the need for a general Australian dictionary. In the late 1970s, based at the Australian National University in Canberra, he began research on a specialised work, a dictionary of Australianisms based on historical principles. The dictionary would be an Australian version of the Oxford English Dictionary, recording the history of Australian words. After several years of data collection a publishing contract was signed with Oxford University Press (Australia) in 1983, and Ramson and his team began work on the editing process. The trials and tribulations of this process are outlined in Ramson’s book Lexical Images (OUP, 2005).

The Australian National Dictionary Project became the Australian National Dictionary Centre with the signing of a contract between Oxford University Press and the Australian National University in 1988.

== The Australian National Dictionary ==
The Australian National Dictionary Centre's major research project is the Australian National Dictionary. The project seeks to find English words and meanings that have originated in Australia, that have a greater currency in Australia than elsewhere, or that have a special significance in Australian history. The first edition of the dictionary was published in 1988 and contains some 10,000 entries. The second edition was published in 2016 and contains 16,000 entries.

== Monographs on Australian English ==
The Australian National Dictionary Centre produces a number of monographs resulting from data collection from regional sources: glossaries covering Tasmanian, Western Australian, Queensland, and South Australian words, along with monographs about specific sub-genres of Australian English such as Aboriginal English, military slang, and the language of early Australian gold miners.

== Australian Oxford Dictionaries ==
The Australian National Dictionary Centre edits a number of dictionaries for Oxford University Press, including the Australian Pocket Oxford Dictionary, the Australian Concise Oxford Dictionary, and school dictionaries and thesauruses.

== Directors ==
W. S. Ramson was Director from 1988 to 1994. Bruce Moore was Director from 1994 to 2011. Sarah Ogilvie was Director from January to June 2012. The current Director, Amanda Laugesen, was appointed in 2012.

== Publications ==
- The Australian National Dictionary. W. S. Ramson. Oxford University Press, 1988. Second edition 2016. Bruce Moore.
- W. H. Downing's Digger Dialects. Ed. J. M. Arthur and W. S. Ramson. Oxford University Press, 1990.
- Australian Aboriginal Words in English: Their Origin and Meaning. R. M. W. Dixon, W. S. Ramson, Mandy Thomas.Oxford University Press, 1990. Second edition 2006. R. M. W. Dixon, W. S. Ramson, Bruce Moore, Mandy Thomas.
- A Lexicon of Cadet Language: Royal Military College, Duntroon, in the period 1983 to 1985. Bruce Moore. Australian National Dictionary Centre, 1993.
- Words from the West: A Glossary of Western Australian Terms. Maureen Brooks and Joan Ritchie. Oxford University Press, 1994.
- Tassie Terms: A Glossary of Tasmanian Terms. Maureen Brooks and Joan Ritchie. Oxford University Press, 1995.
- Aboriginal English. J. M. Arthur. Oxford University Press, 1996
- Gold! Gold! Gold! The Language of the Nineteenth-Century Australian Goldfield. Bruce Moore. Oxford University Press, 2000.
- Who's Centric Now? The Present State of Post-Colonial Englishes. Bruce Moore ed. Oxford University Press, 2001.
- Voices of Queensland: Words from the Sunshine State. Julia Robinson. Oxford University Press, 2001.
- Lexical Images: The Story of the Australian National Dictionary. W. S. Ramson. Oxford University Press, 2002.
- Convict Words: Language in Early Colonial Australia. Amanda Laugesen Oxford University Press, 2002.
- Bardi Grubs and Frog Cakes: South Australian Words. Dorothy Jauncey. Oxford University Press, 2004.
- Diggerspeak: The Language of Australians at War. Amanda Laugesen. Oxford University Press, 2005.
- Speaking Our Language: The Story of Australian English. Bruce Moore. Oxford University Press, 2008.
- What's Their Story? A History of Australian Words. Bruce Moore. Oxford University Press, 2010.

The Centre also edits Australian Oxford dictionaries for Oxford University Press Australia and New Zealand.
