= Bobby Madden =

Scottish football referee

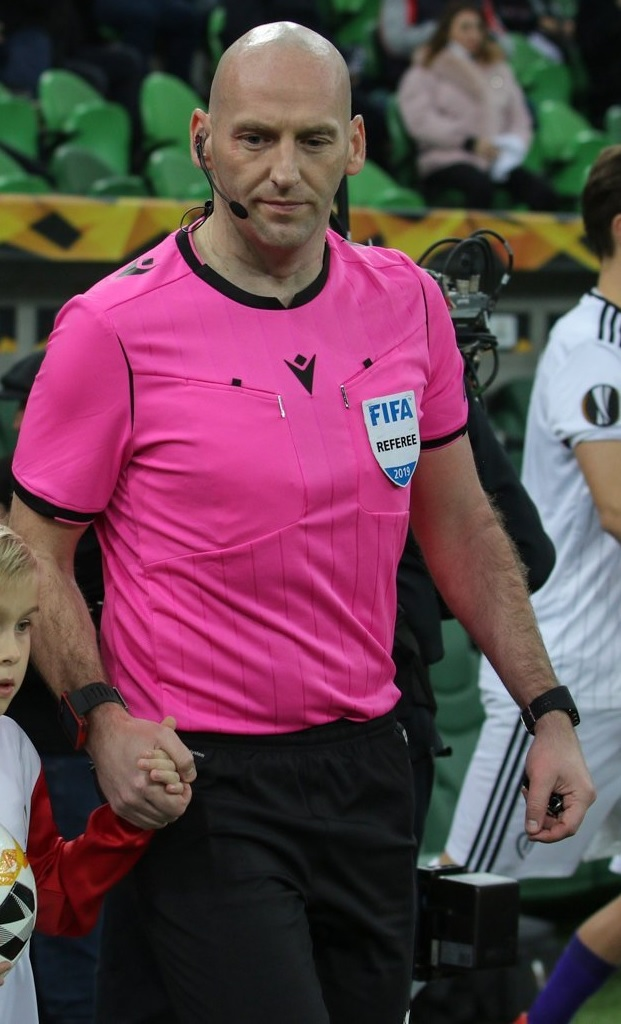
- Madden in 2019
- Full name: Robert Adam Madden
- Born: 25 October 1978 (age 47); East Kilbride, Scotland

Domestic
Years	League	Role
2002–2022	Scottish Football Association	Referee
2008–2013	SFL / SPL	Referee
2010–2022	FIFA	Referee
2013–2022	SPFL	Referee
2022–2023	The Football Association	Referee
2022–2023	EFL	Referee

Robert Adam Madden (born 25 October 1978) is a Scottish former football referee.

Madden became a FIFA referee in 2010. He officiated in 2014 World Cup qualifiers, beginning with the match between Germany and the Faroe Islands. He left the FIFA list in 2022, as he moved from Scotland to England and officiated in EFL League One and EFL League Two games during the 2022–23 season.

Madden retired in 2023, a year ahead of his planned retirement date. After announcing his retirement Madden said that he "didn't enjoy it [English football] as much as I thought I would've", and cited frustration at how a case where a club official had allegedly made anti-Scottish remarks to him had been handled.
