= Andrew Christie =

Andrew Christie may refer to:

- Andrew D. Christie (1922–1993), Delaware Supreme Court Justice
- Christie Cleek, or Andrew Christie (fl. mid-14th century), Scottish cannibal
- Andy Onyeama-Christie (born 1999), English-Scottish rugby union player
- Andrew Christie Jr., New Hampshire state legislator

== See also ==
- Drew Christie (born 1984), American animator and filmmaker
