= Balcreuchan Port =

Bay and raised beach site in Colmonell, South Ayrshire, Scotland

- Ballantrae, Scotland; GB grid reference NX908878
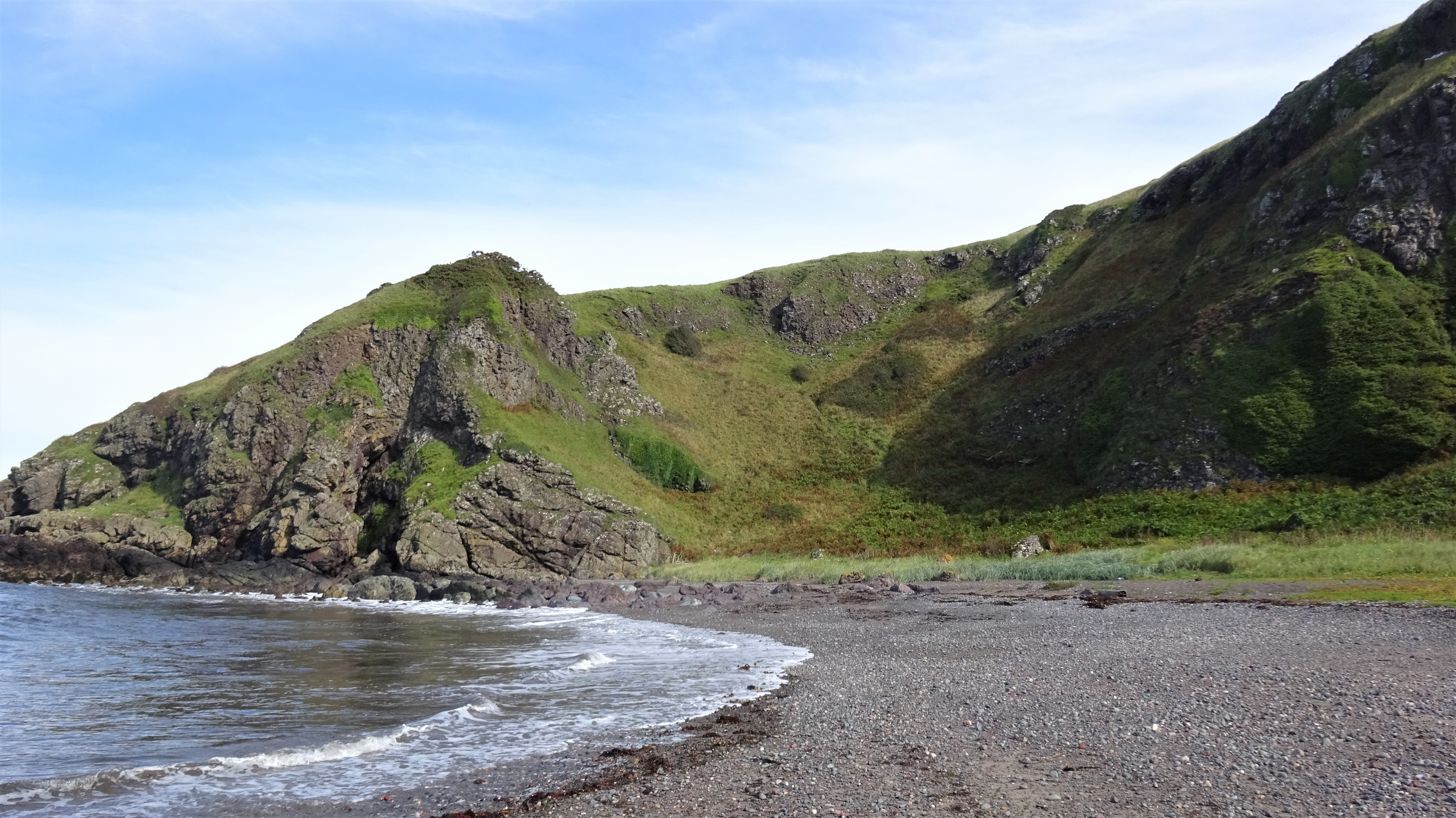
- Balcreuchan Port and Cave

Location
- Location within West Dunbartonshire
- Coordinates: 55.145565°N 4.9845220°W

Balcreuchan Port or Balcruachan Port (NX0908878) is a bay and raised beach site in the parish of Colmonell, close to Bennane Head and Port Vad (NX091870) in South Ayrshire, Scotland. It is well known for its cave (NX099876) with its links to the legend of Sawney Bean and also for the unusual geology that is found in the bay. It was a minor fishing harbour up until the mid to late 19th century.

== Infrastructure ==
The first edition of the OS Map shows that a channel in the bay that had been cleared of stones to permit the safe landing of boats. The channel remnants are currently still visible at low tide (Datum 2020). No other artificial features directly related to the port itself have been observed.

== History ==
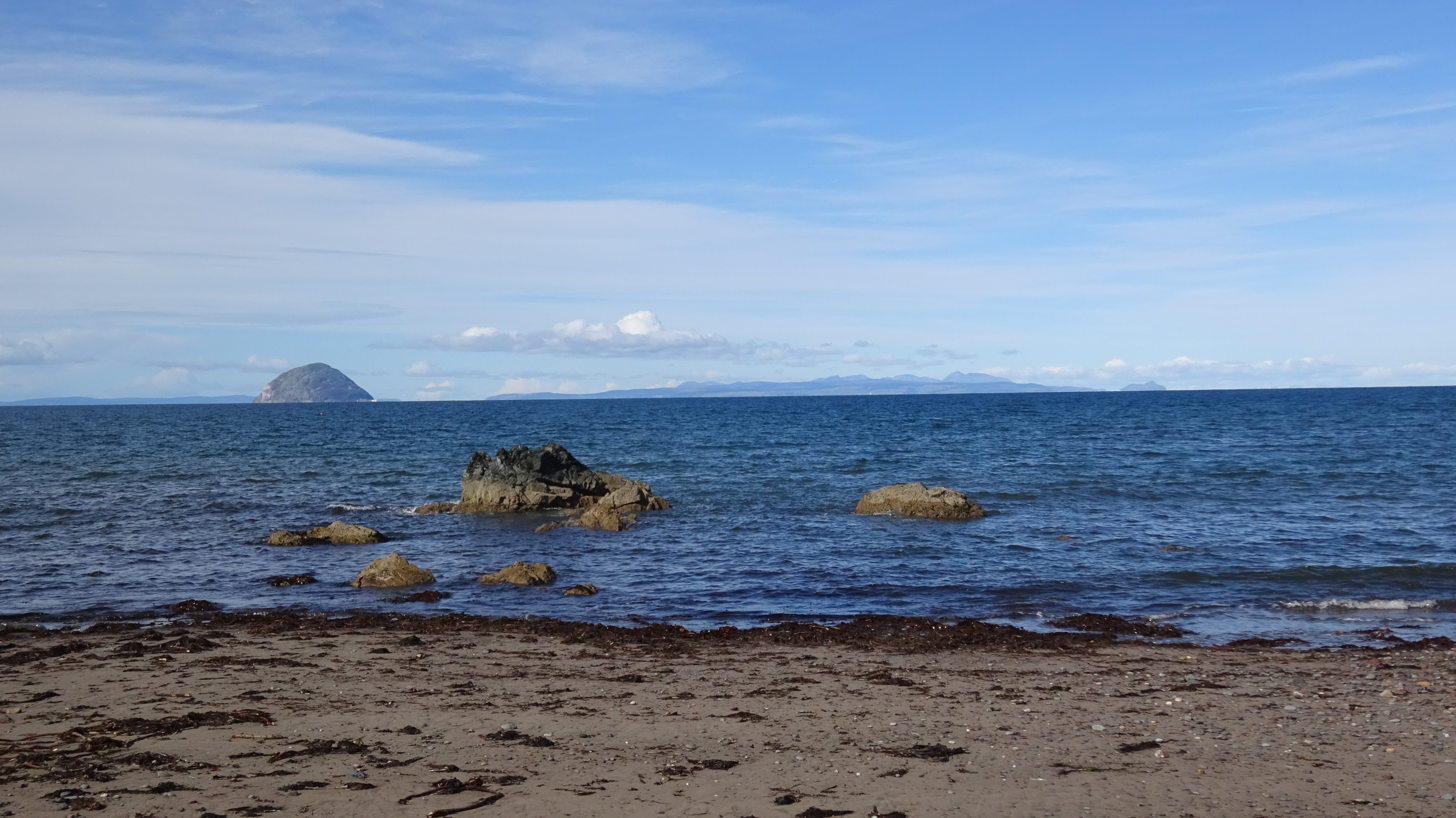
The site of the cleared channel with Ailsa Craig and the Isle of Arran in the background

The name 'Port' is indicative of its use, and Balcreuchan is Gaelic, with the first 'Bal' part meaning a farmstead. A farm of that name is shown slightly inland from the port. The 'creuchan' may be from crìochan, 'borders' or 'bounds' as in Na Crìochan, 'the Borders', and Na Garbh Chrìochan - 'the rough bounds/Highlands'. The Balcreuchan Burn runs to the coast just east of the port up to the area of Knockormal Hill and the 'Lochton' place names suggest a more substantial flow at one time.

This remote area is well known for smuggling in the past, and Balcreuchan Port had a reputation for such activities in association with the existence of the cave.

Alexander Peden was a famous Ayrshire Covenanter minister who had been captured at a conventicle near remote Knockdow not far from Balcreuchan Port and sentenced to a jail term on the Bass Rock. He later spent some time in Northern Ireland and upon his return to Scotland in the 1680s he may have landed at Balcreuchan Bay as the secluded bay he landed at is recorded as having been between Ballantrae and Lendalfoot, with a shingle beach.

=== The port ===
It is described as a "Small Creek or indentation of the sea Coast where there is a Small flat beach. Composed of Shingle & boulders." The Scotlands Places site records that boats were pulled up onto the beach and secured here in the summer months. Port Vad nearby has a similar record but it was more exposed to wind and wave action. The nearby enclosure suggests that the bay may have been inhabited during the summer months by fishermen. The transport of stock and materials such as lime for the fields are not on record for the bay.

=== The cave ===
Two cave sites are linked with the legend of Sawney Bean, Balcreuchan being often quoted; the other is Bennane Cave a short distance down the coast towards Ballantrae. In some cases the name Bennane Cave is given; however the description and/or photographs match Balcreuchan Cave.

In the 1970s Balcreuchan Cave became associated with Sawney Bean, and this led to a safe path down to the site being created, and the cave was soon after recorded on Ordnance Survey maps.

It is on record in 1912 that tramps and gypsies used Balcreuchan Cave for overnight stays.

The cave itself is damp, and about seventy feet deep and is accessed by a gully through the rocks that is flooded when the tide is high. It is said that the cave once ran for a mile or more into the headland.

=== The enclosure ===
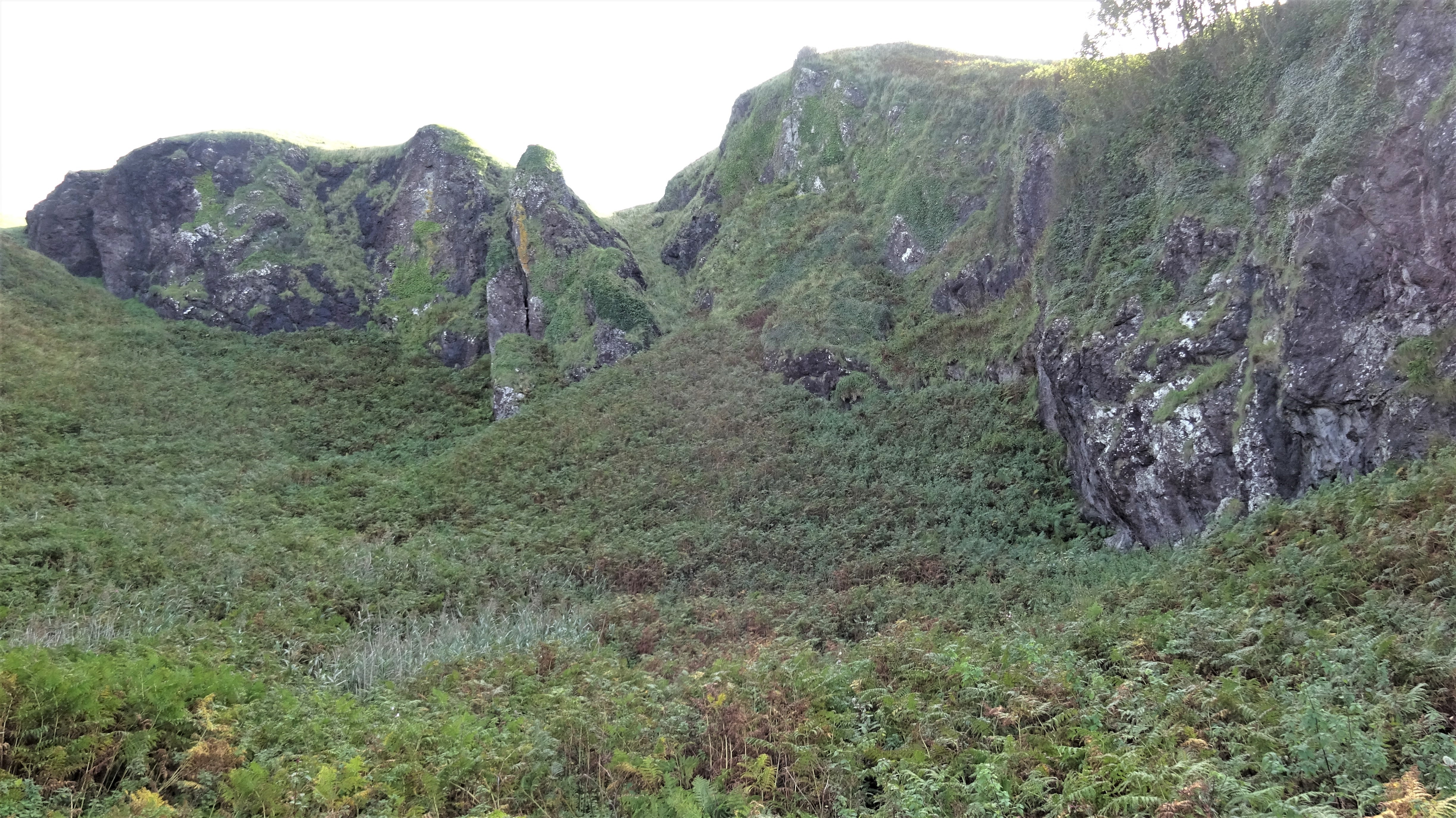
The location of the walled enclosure beneath the headland.

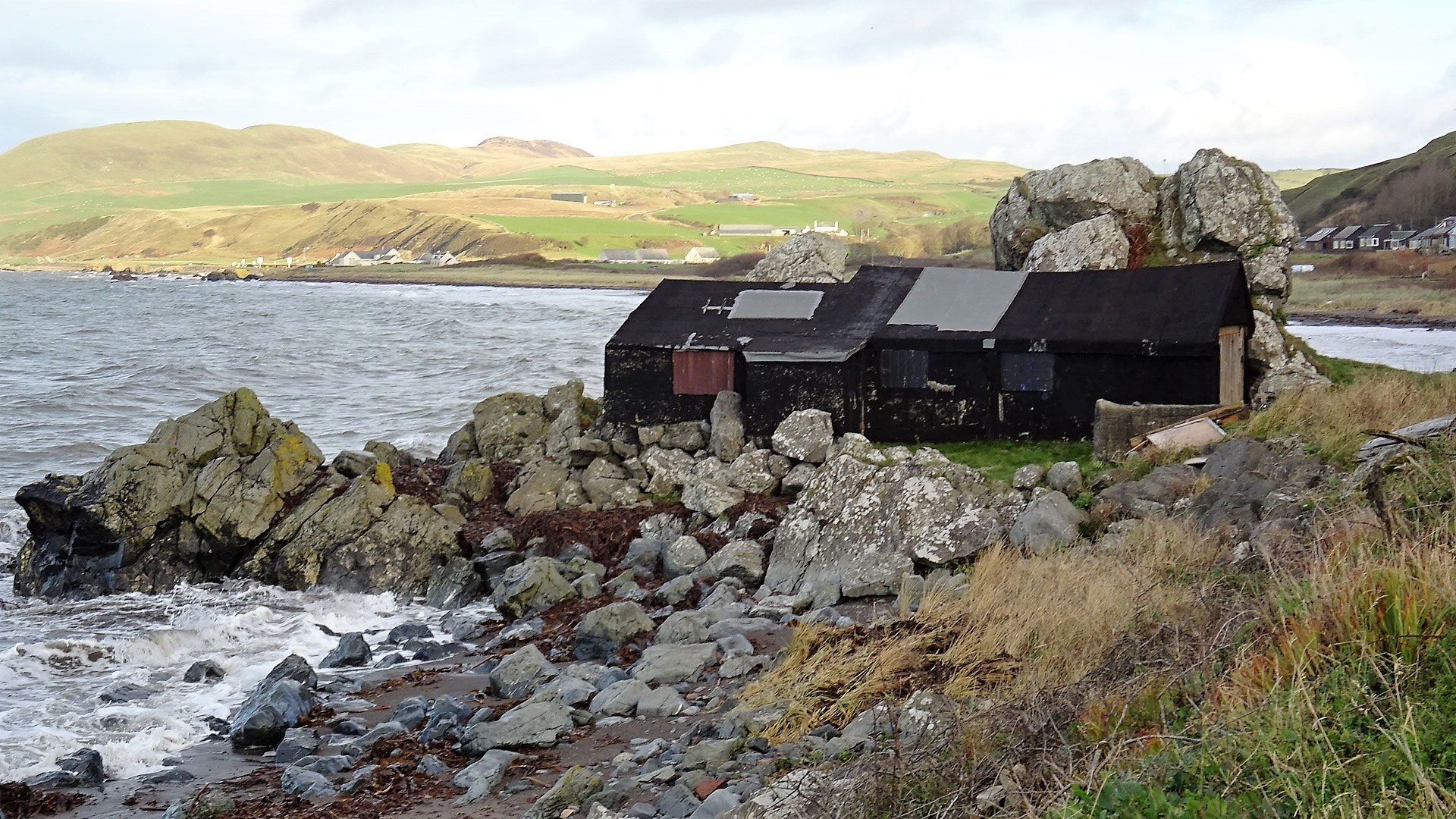
Fishermen's sheds at the Carleton Fishery

The First OS map shows a walled enclosure of about one third of an acre (one eighth of a hectare) located on the raised beach area on the east side of the bay, running up to and sheltered by a headland and well above the spring high tide mark on the raised beach. The enclosure has four or so divisions and sub-divisions. Small structures are shown within the area that may be fishermen's huts. A track ran from the entrance to the enclosure along the raised beach area and then up the slope to reach the top of the cliffs, having passed over the cave. A hay ree for storing animal feed is marked on the OS map where the nearby Balcreuchan Burn reaches the sea.

After the First OS map the enclosure and track are progressively less detailed, with just an enclosure wall indicated and then the site not marked at all. This may have been a summer dwelling for fishermen with huts or sheds much like the surviving example at the old Carleton Fishery just up the coast, where a similar clearing of a channel on the beach of stones is shown on the OS map.

== The site today ==
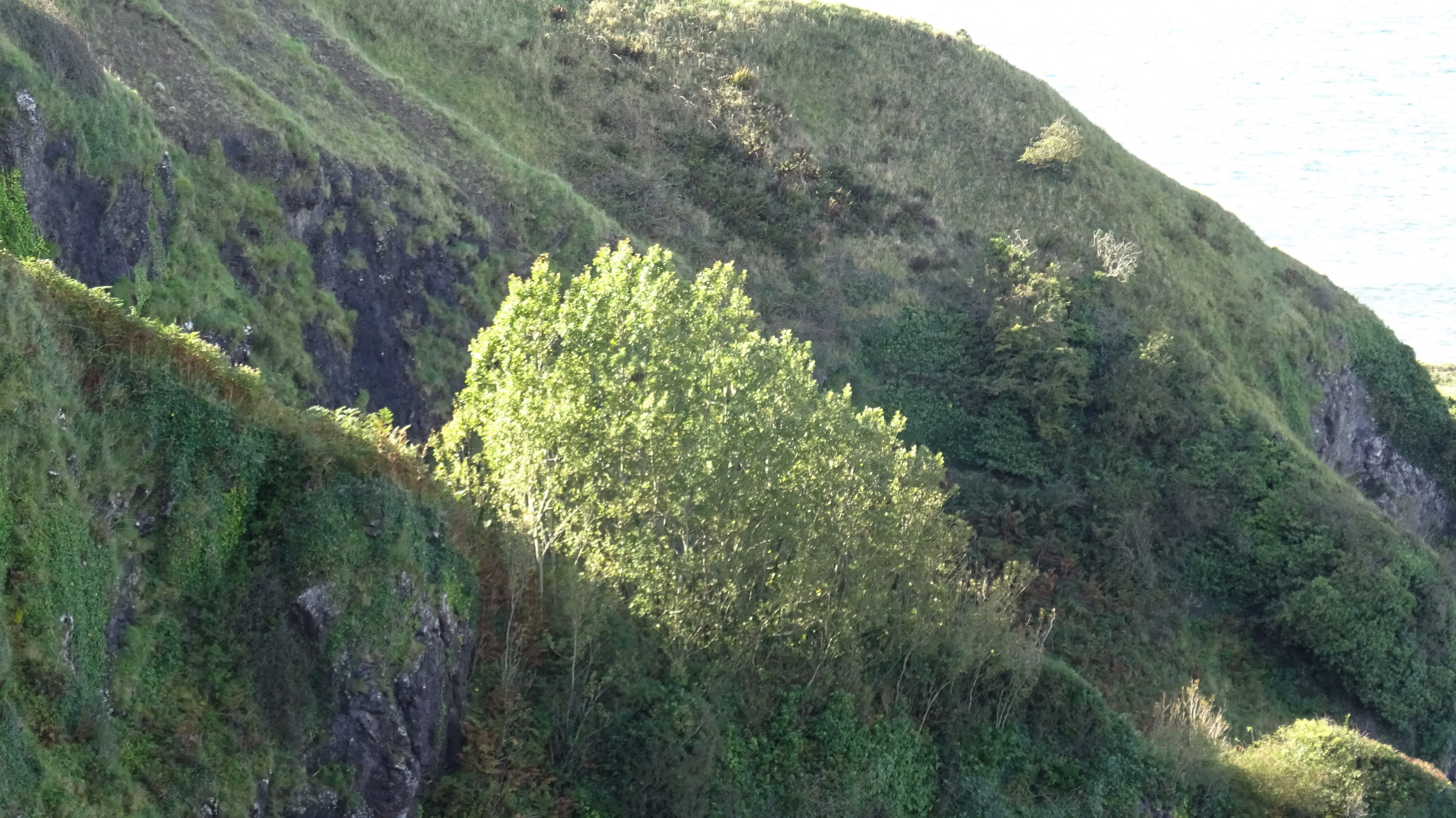
The aspen clone on the headland

The fallen walls of the enclosure are not visible amongst the dense undergrowth, although there are many stones throughout the area. The track from the enclosure and up the cliff slope is not discernable. As stated, the area of channel cleared of stones in the bay can still be made out at low tide. The cave access has been hindered by the fall of a large boulder that must be climbed over to gain access to the cave itself. There are a lot of graffiti on the walls of the cave.

The former Kyle and Carrick District Council opened a safe access path in 1978 and publicised the links with Sawney Bean, however the port now has no maintained path and access requires appropriate sturdy hill walking footwear and great caution.

== Botany ==
The headland above the old enclosure is the location of a rare tree for this area of Scotland, the aspen (Populus tremula). A clone of the aspen is grows along the summit ridge. Part of the bay lies in a Site of Special Scientific Interest (SSSI).

== Geology ==
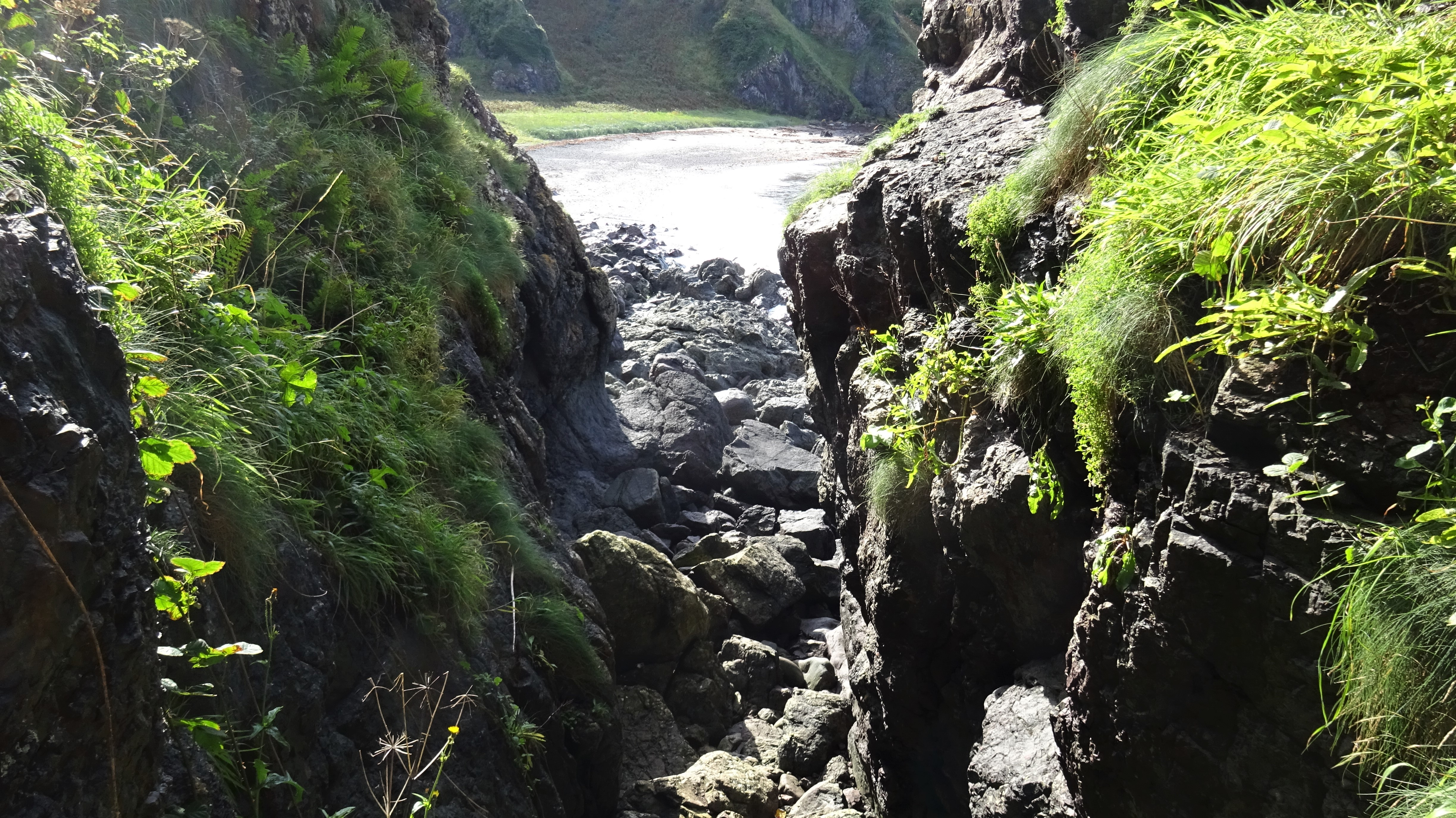
View from Balcreuchan Cave entrance down to the beach

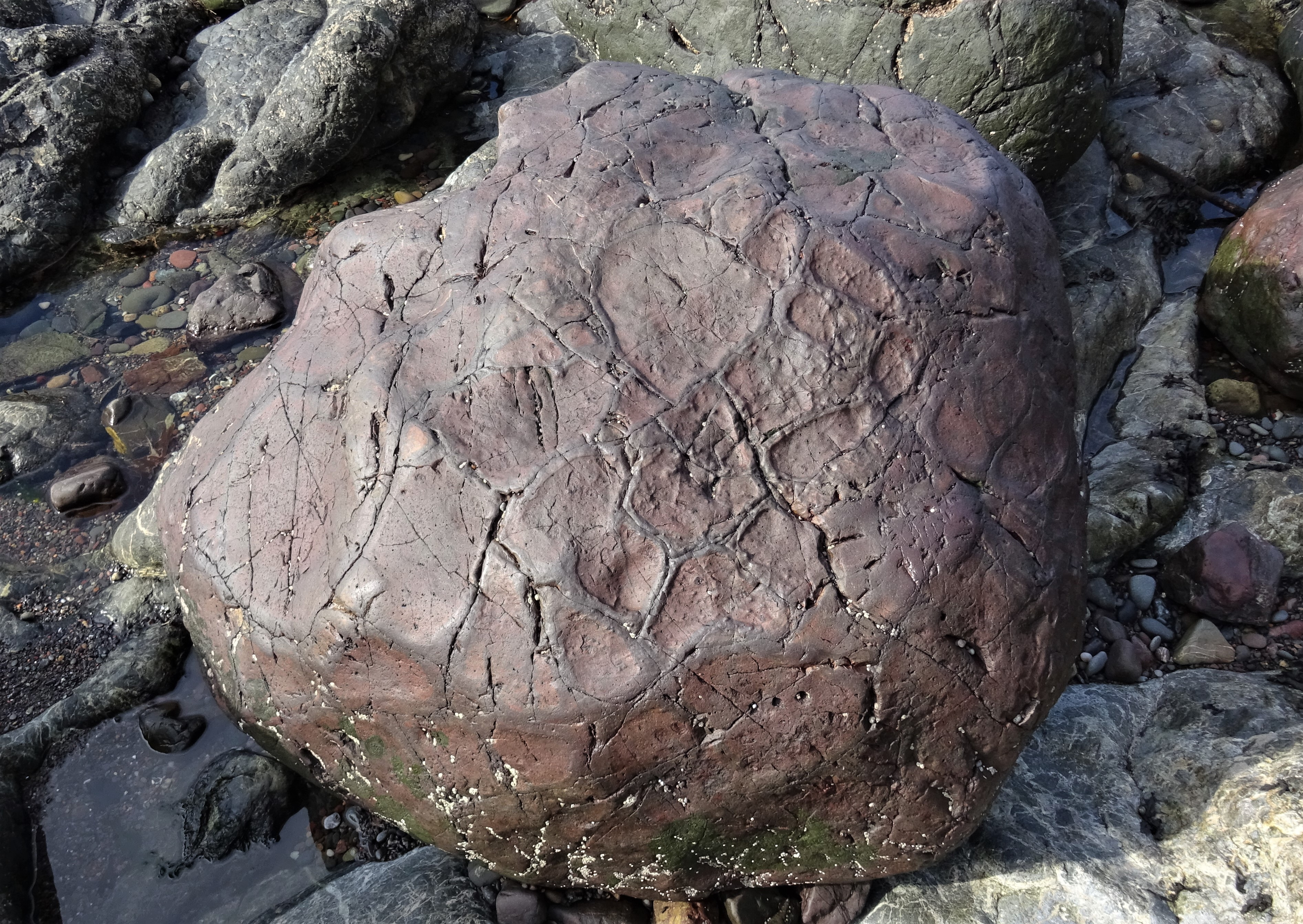
A basalt boulder near the cave

The rocks here are a section of ancient oceanic crust around 500 million years old. This rare rock formation has formed because a fragment of oceanic crust has been emplaced onto continental crust. In the bay, rocks of the upper mantle progress to igneous rocks of the oceanic crust and finally on to the sedimentary rocks of the ancient sea floor. The rarely exposed rocks of the upper mantle are visible. These are serpentinite rocks that once lay over 5 kilometres beneath the seabed. A major fault separates the serpentinites of the ancient upper mantle and the igneous rocks of the crust, cutting in front of Balcreuchan Cave which is itself formed in basalt. Towards the foreshore a prominent igneous dyke cuts through the softer serpentinite.
