= Girvan =

Burgh in South Ayrshire, Scotland

Coordinates: 55.238°N 4.856°W

Girvan: Scottish Gaelic: Inbhir Gharbhain
- Burgh
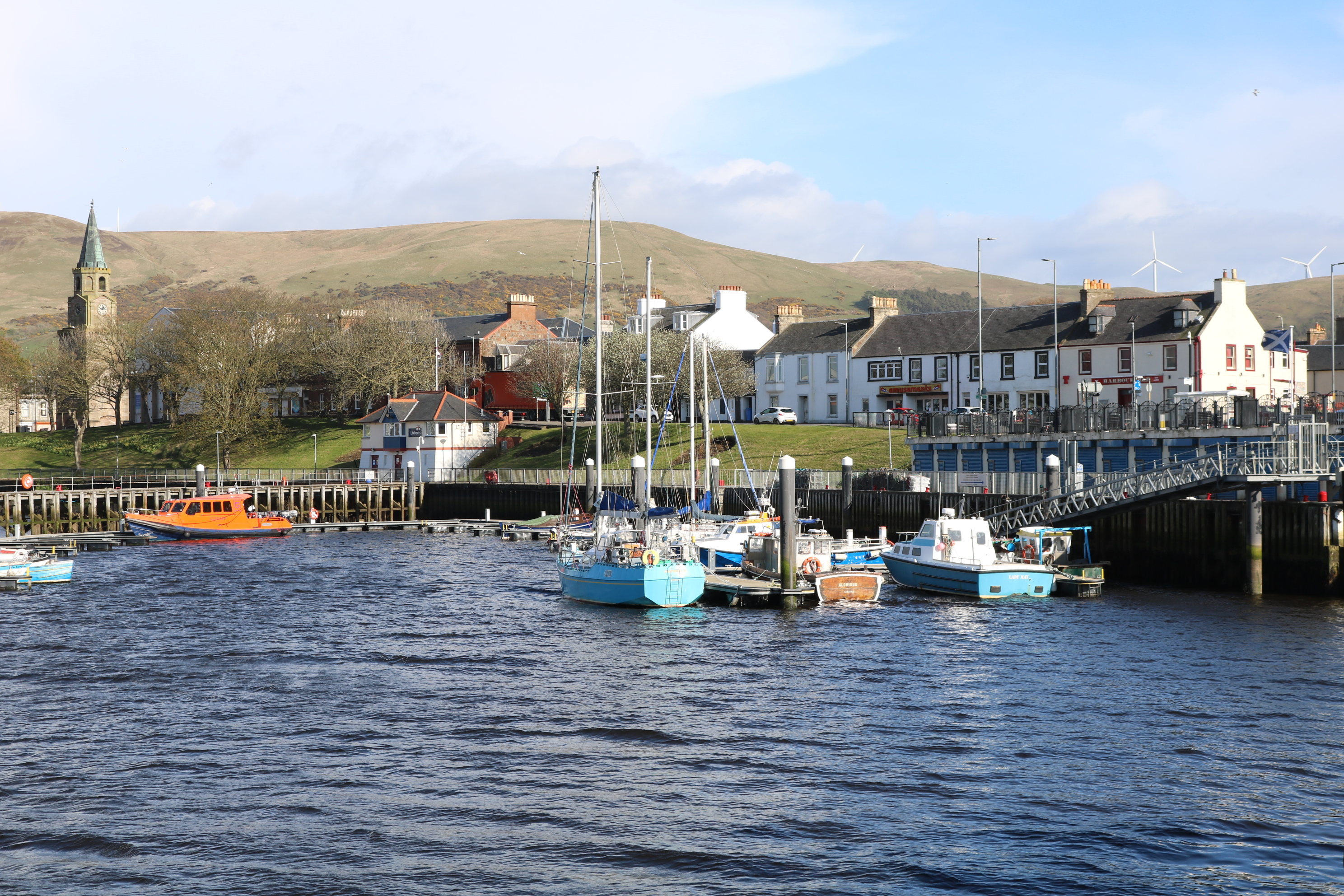
- Girvan Harbour, with part of the town's skyline in the background

- Flag

- Location within South Ayrshire
- Population: 6,309 (2022)
- Demonym: Girvanite
- OS grid reference: NX185975
  - Edinburgh: 81 mi (130 km)
  - London: 323 mi (520 km)
- Council area: South Ayrshire
- Lieutenancy area: Ayrshire and Arran
- Country: Scotland
- Sovereign state: United Kingdom
- Post town: GIRVAN
- Postcode district: KA26
- Dialling code: 01465
- Police: Scotland
- Fire: Scottish
- Ambulance: Scottish
- UK Parliament: Ayr, Carrick and Cumnock
- Scottish Parliament: Carrick, Cumnock and Doon Valley

Girvan (Scottish Gaelic: Inbhir Gharbhain, "mouth of the River Girvan") is a harbour town and burgh in Carrick, South Ayrshire, Scotland. Girvan is situated on the east coast of the Firth of Clyde, with a population of about 6,450. It lies 21 miles (34 km) south of Ayr, and 29 miles (47 km) north of Stranraer, the main ferry port from Scotland to Northern Ireland.

Deriving its name from the river which runs through the landscape the etymology of Girvan has possible Brythonic origins, related to the Welsh: Gearafon or Gwyrddafon, "river flowing through the green flourishing place, from afon or avon, a river, and Gwyrdd, green, flourishing".

== History ==
=== Prehistory and archaeology ===
The earliest evidence of human habitation in the Girvan area dates to the Mesolithic.

Between 1996 and 1998, archaeological investigations were undertaken by GUARD archaeology (then part of the University of Glasgow) as part of an expansion of the William Grant & Sons distillery. This work discovered several burnt mounds that dated to the later third millennium/early second millennium BC and an Iron Age trackway. They also discovered a medieval moated enclosure, which is a house or compound surrounded by a moat. These are usually the homes of minor aristocracy but are rare in Scotland (of the roughly 5400 known from mainland Britain, only ~120 are in Scotland). It is surmised that it might have belong to the Bruce family group, either a relative or a supporter and that it was likely that the house would have been known to Robert the Bruce, as he was born at Turnberry.

Two Roman camps lie half a mile (0.8 km) north of the estuary of the Water of Girvan in level fields of Girvan Mains Farm. The discovery of a fragment of a late first-century glass vessel in the primary ditch-fill of the second camp, combined with the almost square plan of the first, makes it entirely reasonable to assume that these were bases used by the forces of Agricola during the campaigns 78-84 AD mentioned by Tacitus in (de Vita Agricolae, cap xxiv) as relating to a possible descent upon Ireland. The provision of a beach head at either site would have allowed the camps to fulfill the function of a base for Agricolan combined army and naval operations around the Scottish coast.

=== Expansion ===
Girvan was originally a fishing port. In 1668, it became a municipal burgh incorporated by charter.

The opening of the railways, initially with the Maybole and Girvan Railway at the end of the 1850s, encouraged the development of Girvan as a seaside resort with beaches and cliffs. Holidaying here from 1855 to 1941 were Robert and Elizabeth Gray and their children; particularly Alice and Edith Gray. The family, led principally by Elizabeth and Alice, created scientifically organised collections of fossils for several museums including the Natural History Museum.

Girvan Lifeboat Station was opened by the Royal National Lifeboat Institution in 1865 with a boathouse was built on land donated by the Duchesse de Coigny. It moved to its present site in 1993. Since 2018 it has operated the Shannon-class lifeboat RNLB Elizabeth and Gertrude Allan.

=== Recent history ===
Just north of the town is Grangestone Industrial Estate, which hosts a William Grant & Sons distillery which opened in 1964. There is a Nestlé factory that manufactures chocolate that is shipped down to York and used in Kit Kat and Yorkie bars.

On 12 October 2024, a memorial stele was inaugurated in Doune Cemetery, Girvan, to honour the 31 crew members of the French cargo ship Longwy, who were lost when the ship was torpedoed off the coast of Stranraer on 4 November 1917, during World War I. Among those remembered, two French sailors from the Longwy, Adolphe Harré and Samuel Brajeul, are buried in Doune Cemetery. The commemoration aimed to recognise the sacrifices made by the French crew members and strengthen Franco-Scottish ties.

== Culture ==
=== Places of interest ===
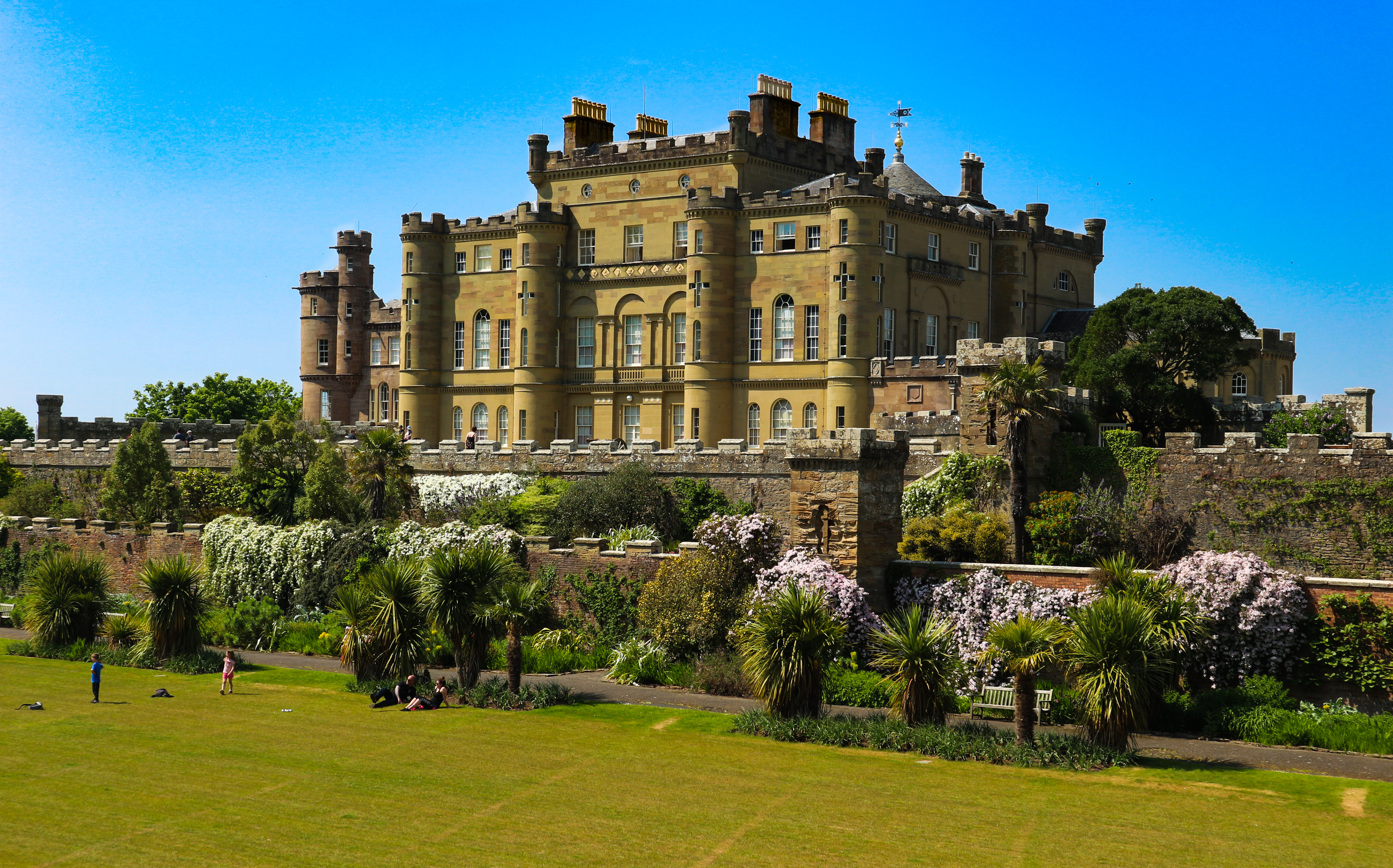
Nearby Culzean Castle is a popular tourist destination

Knockcushan Gardens contains the old 'Hill of Justice' stone and a plaque records that King Robert the Bruce, Earl of Carrick held a court here in 1328.

The McKechnie Institute was endowed by local businessmen Robert and Thomas McKechnie, and was opened in 1889. The Institute plays host to regular displays and sales of local artists, offers tours and historical information about Girvan and the surrounding area. It is free to access when open.

Culzean Castle is about 8 miles (13 km) north of the town, and the volcanic island of Ailsa Craig is visible about 10 miles (16 km) offshore. Turnberry golf course and hotel are located 5 miles (8 km) north of Girvan. The coastline south of Girvan is famous for its geology, and also for the Sawney Bean Caves at Bennane Head or Balcreuchan Port, where the murderer and cannibal Sawney Bean supposedly lived until his arrest and execution in Edinburgh.

=== Local festivals ===
The Girvan Traditional Folk Festival takes place each year, on the Mayday holiday weekend. There were folk festivals held in the town from the mid 1960s however the Festival, in its current form, began proper in 1975. The Festival is one of Scotland's longest-established gatherings of folk and traditional musicians and played a defining role in the Scottish Folk Revival – serving both as a significant annual celebration for traditional singers but also as a major session festival. Girvan's long-standing folk club which played a foundational role in the early years of the Festival has recently been revitalised and re-christened as the Girvan Folk & Music Club.

Girvan lifeboat harbour gala takes place each summer, usually in July, with music, stalls, fun fair, rescue displays and emergency services. The Lowland Gathering takes place on the first Sunday of June each year in the Victory Park in the centre of the town. The annual Festival of Light organised by CRAG community arts takes place in October with a six-week lantern project resulting in the river of light lantern procession and shorefront performance. The autumn lantern project is a celebration of the lanternmakers and the people of Carrick.

Strandline an illuminated trail around the old town of Girvan takes place on Hogmanay a new years event for families, involving lantern trails, lights and art aimed at families. Organised by Carrick Rural Arts.

== Economy and infrastructure ==
=== Education and community ===
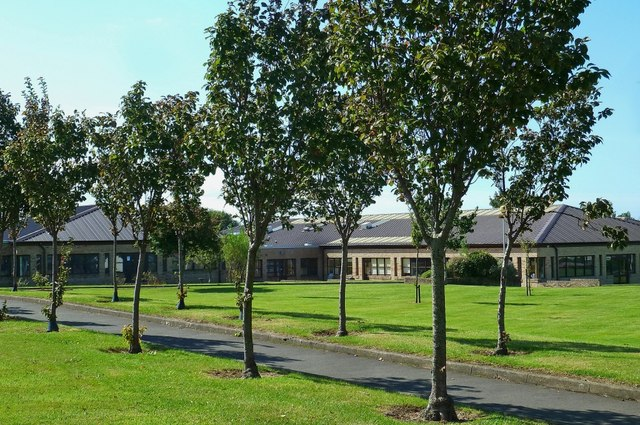
Girvan Academy is the towns only secondary school

Girvan has its own secondary school, Girvan Academy, which the majority of local children attend. Roman Catholic families have the option of Queen Margaret Academy in Ayr. There are also two primary schools, Girvan Primary School (non-denominational) and Sacred Heart Primary School (denominational) and there is one non-denominational specialist school, Invergarven School.

The town's swimming pool was closed in 2009 by South Ayrshire Council, on the grounds that it had reached the end of its operational life. The building has since been demolished. A new leisure centre, named 'The Quay Zone' was officially opened on 26 April 2017. 'The Quay Zone' was built in a way to help redevelop Girvan. It is sited on the old swimming pool's location at the harbour.

=== Transport ===
Girvan railway station is served by ScotRail on the Glasgow Central to Stranraer line. All services call here, and several more start/terminate here. Girvan is also served well by bus. Bus services are run by Stagecoach West Scotland, Shuttle Buses, and South Ayrshire Community Transport.

== Demographics ==
=== Population ===
At the 2022 Scottish census, Girvan had a total population of 6,309 inhabitants.

=== Religion ===
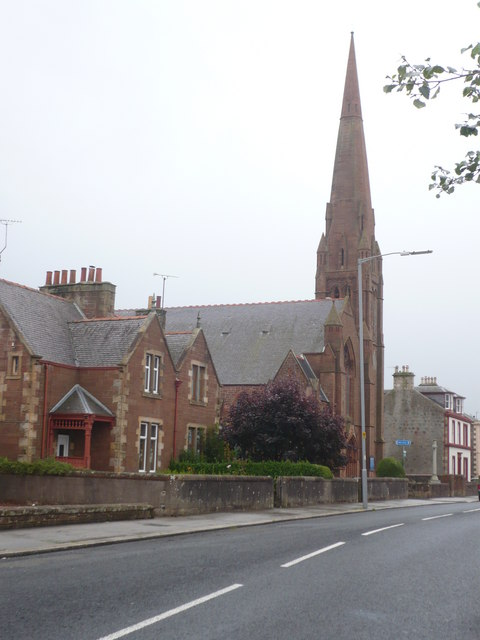
Girvan North Parish Church, a religious meeting place of the Church of Scotland

The 2022 Scottish census found that 50% of Girvan's population identified as having no religion, while 42% identified with Christian denominations and 1% other religions. 7% of Girvan's population did not answer the optional question.

==== Christian churches ====
The Roman Catholic church in the town, "Sacred Hearts of Jesus and Mary", built in 1860 in a plain gothic style. For many years the convent and the church were closely connected with Roman Catholic primary and secondary schools in Girvan. The secondary school closed in 1991.

Girvan has two Church of Scotland congregations: Girvan North Parish Church dating from 1883 in Montgomerie Street (with a spire over 100 feet or 30 metres tall) and Girvan South Parish Church dating from 1839.

Milestone Christian Fellowship, a local congregation which began meeting in Girvan's Community Centre in 2005, moved into a redeveloped nightclub on Bridge Street in 2016. Milestone is a member of the Baptist Union of Scotland.

The town's Episcopalian congregation of St John was closed in 2014: they had been using the town's Methodist church building for services after their building became unusable in 2009.

== Twin town ==
Girvan is twinned with Torcy, Seine-et-Marne, France - in honour of a Scottish knight named Sir Thomas Huston originally from Girvan, who fought the English as part of the Auld Alliance during the Hundred Years War. Rewarding him for his bravery during the capture of Meaux in 1439, the King of France granted him the fiefdom of Torcy.

== Notable people ==
- Andrew Gallacher(born 1976), racing driver
- Peter McCloy (born 1946), footballer
- Rory Wilson (born 2006), footballer
- Greig Young (born 1959), footballer

== Climate ==
Girvan has an oceanic climate (Köppen: Cfb).

Climate data for Girvan (9 m or 30 ft asl, averages 1991–2020)
Month	Jan	Feb	Mar	Apr	May	Jun	Jul	Aug	Sep	Oct	Nov	Dec	Year
Record high °C (°F)	15.0 (59.0)	15.1 (59.2)	19.6 (67.3)	23.8 (74.8)	25.6 (78.1)	27.8 (82.0)	30.9 (87.6)	30.1 (86.2)	26.5 (79.7)	21.8 (71.2)	16.9 (62.4)	14.5 (58.1)	30.9 (87.6)
Mean daily maximum °C (°F)	7.9 (46.2)	8.2 (46.8)	9.7 (49.5)	12.4 (54.3)	15.4 (59.7)	17.6 (63.7)	19.0 (66.2)	18.8 (65.8)	16.9 (62.4)	13.6 (56.5)	10.4 (50.7)	8.5 (47.3)	13.2 (55.8)
Daily mean °C (°F)	5.5 (41.9)	5.6 (42.1)	6.8 (44.2)	8.9 (48.0)	11.5 (52.7)	14.1 (57.4)	15.6 (60.1)	15.5 (59.9)	13.7 (56.7)	10.7 (51.3)	7.9 (46.2)	5.9 (42.6)	10.2 (50.4)
Mean daily minimum °C (°F)	3.2 (37.8)	3.1 (37.6)	3.9 (39.0)	5.4 (41.7)	7.7 (45.9)	10.6 (51.1)	12.3 (54.1)	12.2 (54.0)	10.5 (50.9)	7.9 (46.2)	5.4 (41.7)	3.4 (38.1)	7.2 (45.0)
Record low °C (°F)	−10.5 (13.1)	−7.5 (18.5)	−5.2 (22.6)	−3.4 (25.9)	−2.2 (28.0)	2.5 (36.5)	6.5 (43.7)	1.8 (35.2)	0.4 (32.7)	−1.5 (29.3)	−6.6 (20.1)	−8.7 (16.3)	−10.5 (13.1)
Average precipitation mm (inches)	109.6 (4.31)	87.2 (3.43)	84.7 (3.33)	61.0 (2.40)	58.9 (2.32)	56.8 (2.24)	78.9 (3.11)	85.4 (3.36)	81.0 (3.19)	123.0 (4.84)	123.0 (4.84)	122.7 (4.83)	1,072.1 (42.21)
Average precipitation days (≥ 1.0 mm)	17.4	14.6	14.0	11.5	11.2	11.3	12.8	14.4	13.6	16.4	17.3	17.2	171.6
Mean monthly sunshine hours	40.2	63.9	101.8	154.1	200.9	166.6	159.5	152.1	114.4	79.8	49.6	36.2	1,319.1
Source 1: Met Office
Source 2: Starlings Roost Weather

== See also ==
- Lendalfoot - a nearby village.
- Girvan Community Hospital
