= Sawney =

Racial slur describing Scotsman

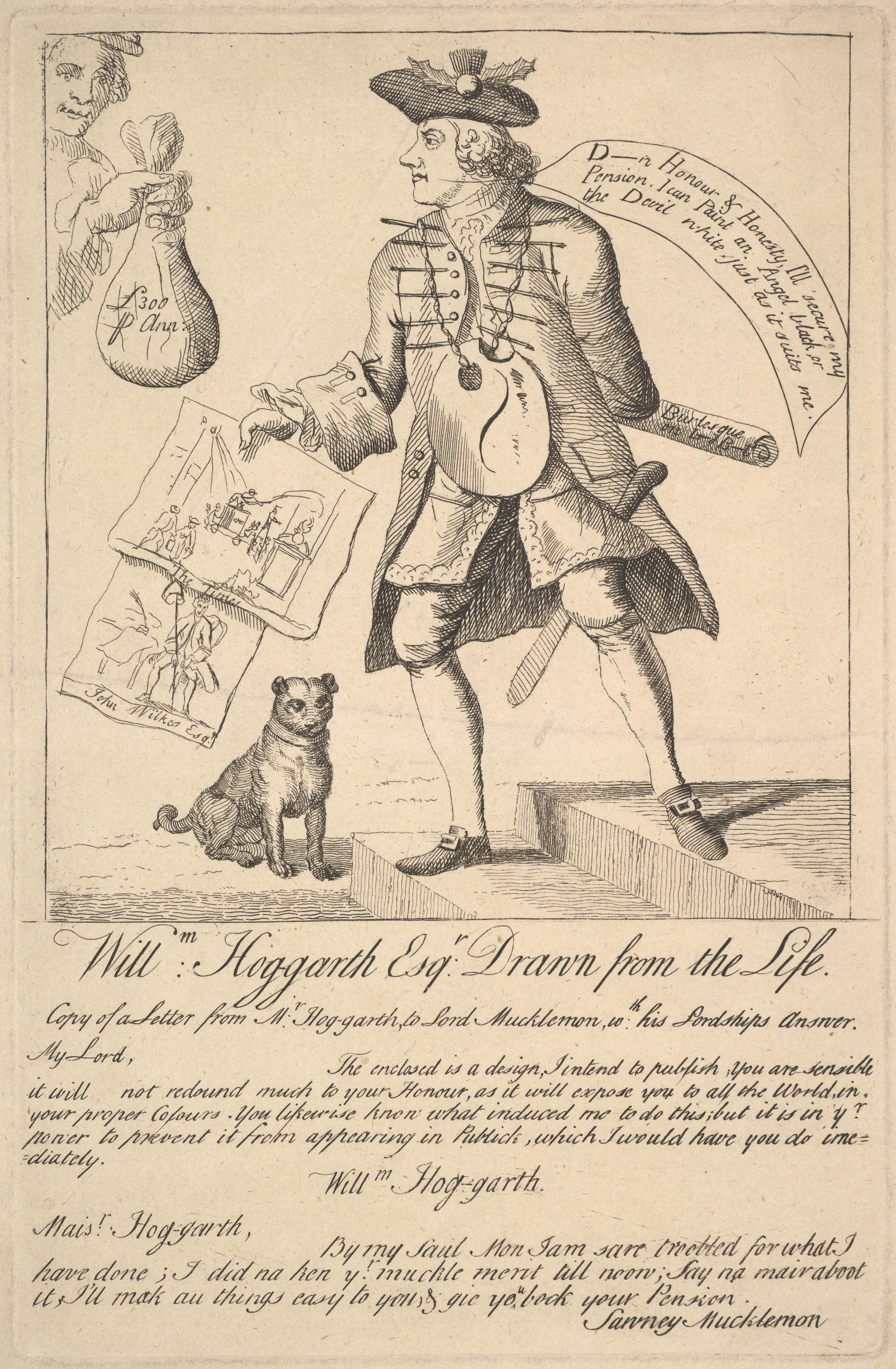
Cartoon of 1763. Lord Bute, or "Sawney Mucklemon", a Scotsman and Prime Minister of Great Britain, offers William Hogarth (with a thistle in his hat) a pension to suppress a satirical print.

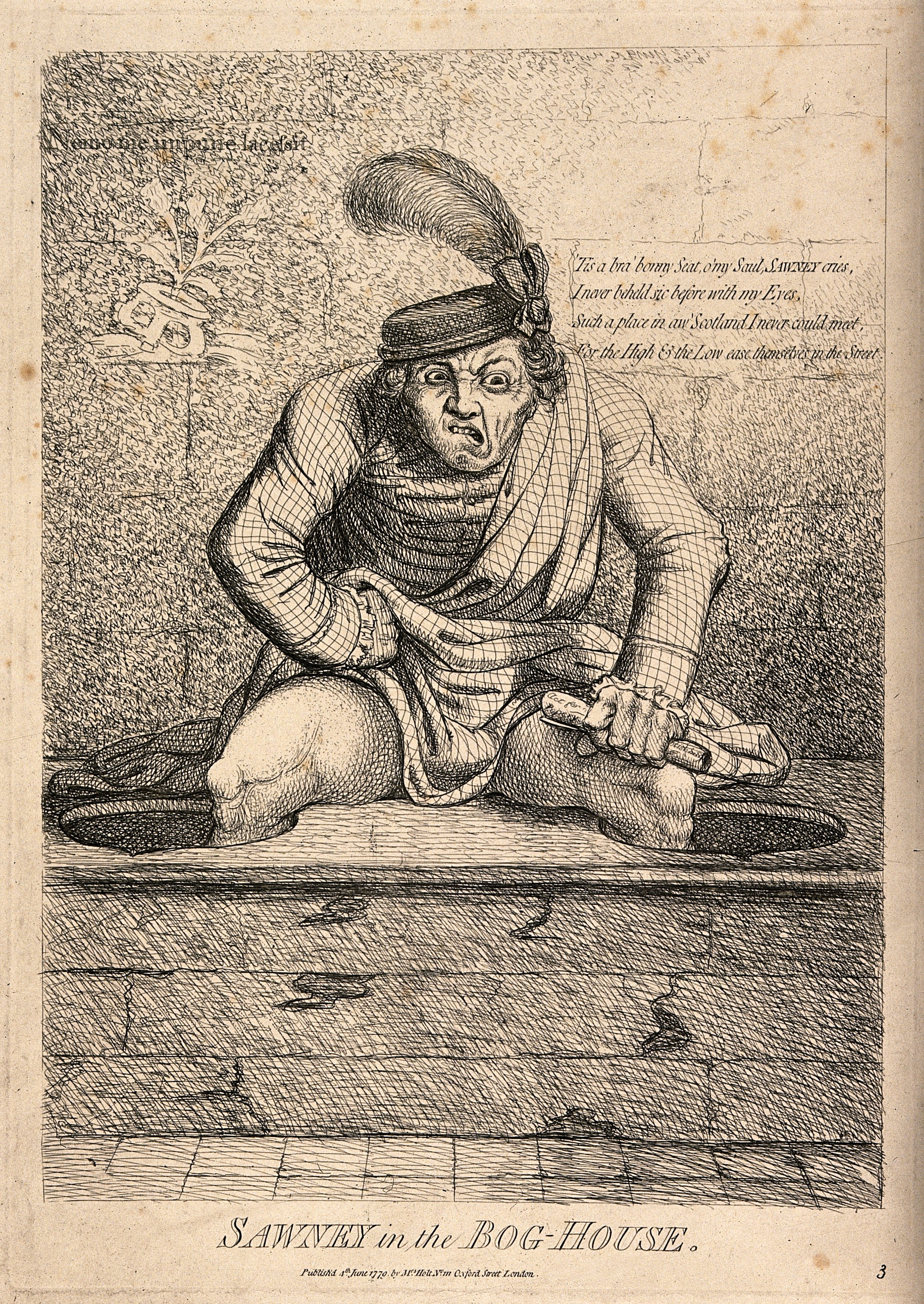
Sawney in the bog house, 1779, attributed to James Gillray

Sawney (sometimes Sandie/y, or Sanders, or Sannock) was an English nickname for a Scotsman, now obsolete, and playing much the same linguistic role that "Jock" does now. The name is a Lowland Scots diminutive of the favourite Scottish first name Alexander (also Alasdair in Scottish Gaelic form, anglicised into Alistair) from the last two syllables. The English commonly abbreviates the first two syllables into "Alec".

From the days after the accession of James VI to the English throne under the title of James I, to the time of George III and the Bute administration, when Scotsmen were exceedingly unpopular and Dr. Samuel Johnson - the great Scotophobe, and son of a Scottish bookseller at Lichfield - thought it prudent to disguise his origin, and overdid his prudence by maligning his father's countrymen, it was customary to designate a Scotsman a "Sawney". This vulgar epithet, however, was dying out fast by the 1880s, and was obsolete by the 20th century.

Sawney was a common figure of fun in English cartoons. A particularly stereotypical example, Sawney in the Bog House, shows a stereotypical Scottish Highlander using a communal bench toilet by sticking one of his legs down each of the holes. This was originally published in London in June 1745, just over a month before Charles Edward Stuart landed in Scotland to begin the Jacobite rising of 1745. In this version Sawney's excreta emerge from below his kilt and flow across the bench. The idea was revived in a different and slightly more decorous version of 1779, which is attributed to the young James Gillray. An inscription reads:

'Tis a bra' bonny seat, o' my saul, Sawney cries,
I never beheld sic before with me Eyes,
Such a place in aw' Scotland I never could meet,
For the High and the Low ease themselves in the Street.

It has also been suggested that the Galloway cannibal Sawney Bean may have been a fabrication to emphasise the alleged savagery of the Scots.

Sometimes also used in the term "Sawney Ha'peth", meaning "Scots halfpennyworth" implying "Scottish fool". At the time of the political union of Scotland and England in 1707, the Pound Scots was worth 1/12 of the Pound Sterling, thus a "Scots halfpennyworth" implies worthlessness.

The word "sawney" survives in the current Official Scrabble Players Dictionary (OSPD), which validates the word in Scrabble tournament play, and is defined as "a foolish person".

== See also ==
- John Bull
- Jock Tamson's Bairns

== Sources ==
The main text of this article is derived from:

- MacKay, Charles – A Dictionary of Lowland Scotch (1888)

With additions from:

- Pittock, Murray – Inventing and Resisting Britain: Cultural Identities in Britain and Ireland, 1685-1789
