= Friendly Fire (poem) =

Anti-Scottish poem

Friendly Fire is a satirical poem by James Michie, published in The Spectator magazine in 2004. In it, the speaker of the poem expresses a hatred of Scottish people and advocates their extermination. As a result, the poem has been the subject of controversy, especially regarding Boris Johnson, who, as editor of The Spectator at the time, approved its publication.

== Criticism ==
Upon the initial publication of the poem in 2004, Maureen Fraser, then director of the Commission for Racial Equality in Scotland, said:

We find this poem very offensive and the language is deeply inflammatory. It does nothing to promote race relations and undermines relations between Scotland and the rest of Britain, and our relationship with other countries. Some of the language, such as 'comprehensive extermination' and 'polluting our stock', is completely and utterly unacceptable. It cannot be tolerated.

In June 2019, the poem began circulating on the internet as a criticism of Boris Johnson for having anti-Scottish prejudice (with some incorrectly attributing Johnson as the author of the poem). In that month, the poem was raised in the House of Commons by the SNP leader at Westminster, Ian Blackford.

== Extract ==
"Down with sandy hair and knobbly knees!
Suppress the tartan dwarves and the Wee Frees!
Ban the kilt, the skean-dhu and the sporran
As provocatively, offensively foreign!"
