= Andrew Gallacher =

British rally driver

- Nationality: (Scotland) Scottish
- Born: 28 March 1976 (age 50)

Scottish Rally Championship career
- Debut season: 2011
- Co-driver: Jane Nicol, Phil Sandman
- Starts: 30
- Wins: 2

Championship titles
- 2018 SRC: Scottish Rally Champion

Andrew Gallacher (born 28 March 1976) is a British rally driver from Girvan. He was Scottish Rally Champion in 2018. He is the son of four time Scottish Rally Champion Drew Gallacher.

== Career ==
Gallacher's first rally was in 2010 on a round of the Scottish Rally Championship driving a Mitsubishi EVO. Varying results came over the following years whilst driving various cars including a Subaru Impreza, Ford Escort Mk2 and a Ford Fiesta 4x4.

Success came in 2018 behind the wheel of a Ford Focus WRC, when alongside regular co-driver Jane Nicol, Gallacher won the Scottish Rally Championship. The pair won two out of the six events held that year and this was enough to see them crowned champions.
