= Greig Young =

Scottish footballer

Personal information
- Date of birth: 24 December 1959 (age 66)
- Place of birth: Girvan, Ayrshire, Scotland
- Position: Goalkeeper

Senior career*
Years	Team	Apps	(Gls)
1978–1984	Clyde	99	(0)
- * Club domestic league appearances and goals

Greig Young (born 24 December 1959), is a Scottish retired football goalkeeper.

Young signed for Clyde in 1978, and made over 100 appearances for the club in his 6-year spell. He left in 1984 to join Whitley Bay.
