= 2018 Scottish Rally Championship =

The Scottish Rally Championship is a rallying series run throughout Scotland over the course of a year that comprises seven gravel surface events.

The 2018 series began in the snow-covered forest tracks around Inverness on 10 February, with the season finale taking place around Castle Douglas on 8 September.

Aberdeen based haulage company ARR Craib were the championship sponsors for the sixth year in a row.

Driver Euan Thorburn and regular co-driver Paul Beaton who won the 2017 championship did not contest the 2018 championship.

Following the Galloway Hills Rally in September, driver Andrew Gallacher and co-driver Jane Nicol were declared 2018 champions in their Ford Focus WRC.

== 2018 calendar ==
For season 2018 there was to be seven events held predominantly on gravel surfaces.

Border Counties Rally: On 2 March it was announced by press release that the 2018 event would be postponed. This was due to severe winter weather in the area on the weekend prior to the expected date of 10 March that would impede the stage preparation. Organisers were in talks with the SRC to make alternative arrangements however no date could be agreed and the event was abandoned for 2018.

Round	Dates	Event	Rally HQ	Surface	Website
1	10 Feb	Snowman Rally	Inverness	Gravel / Snow	(website)
-	Cancelled	Border Counties Rally	Jedburgh	Gravel	(website)
2	21 Apr	Speyside Stages Rally	Elgin	Gravel	(website)
3	19 May	RSAC Scottish Rally	Dumfries	Gravel	(website)
4	23 Jun	Argyll Rally	Dunoon	Gravel	(website)
5	11 Aug	Grampian Stages Rally	Banchory	Gravel	(website)
6	8 Sep	Galloway Hills Rally	Castle Douglas	Gravel	(website)

== 2018 events podium ==
Round	Rally name	Podium finishers			
Round	Rally name	Placing	Driver / Co-Driver	Car	Time / Diff leader
1	Snowman Rally (10 February)	1	Andrew Gallacher / Jane Nicol	Ford Focus WRC	46:28
1	Snowman Rally (10 February)	2	Quintin Milne / Sean Donnelly	Subaru Impreza WRC	+0:06
1	Snowman Rally (10 February)	3	Donnie Macdonald / Andrew Falconer	Ford Fiesta R5	+0:20
-	Border Counties Rally (Cancelled)	1			
-	Border Counties Rally (Cancelled)	2			
-	Border Counties Rally (Cancelled)	3			
2	Speyside Stages (21 April)	1	David Bogie / John Rowan	Skoda Fabia R5	38:34
2	Speyside Stages (21 April)	2	Jock Armstrong / Cameron Fair	Subaru Impreza	+1:16
2	Speyside Stages (21 April)	3	Freddie Milne / Patrick Walsh	Subaru Impreza WRC	+2:00
3	RSAC Scottish Rally (19 May)	1	David Bogie / Kevin Rae	Skoda Fabia R5	42:38
3	RSAC Scottish Rally (19 May)	2	Mark McCulloch / Michael Hendry	Ford Fiesta R5	+1:11
3	RSAC Scottish Rally (19 May)	3	Rory Young / Paul Beaton	Ford Fiesta R5	+1:30
4	Argyll Rally (23 June)	1	Andrew Gallacher / Jane Nicol	Ford Focus WRC	41:16
4	Argyll Rally (23 June)	2	Donnie Macdonald / Jamie Edwards	Ford Fiesta R5	+0:05
4	Argyll Rally (23 June)	3	Bruce McCombie / Michael Coutts	Mitsubishi Lancer EVO IX	+0:32
5	Grampian Stages Rally (11 August)	1	Barry McKenna / Arthur Kierans (Note: Crew was not registered to score points towards the Scottish Rally Championship.)	Ford Fiesta R5	41:30
5	Grampian Stages Rally (11 August)	2	Jock Armstrong / Cameron Fair	Subaru Impreza	+0:56
5	Grampian Stages Rally (11 August)	3	Garry Pearson / Dale Bowen	Ford Fiesta R5	+1:11
6	Galloway Hills Rally (8 September)	1	David Bogie / John Rowan	Skoda Fabia R5	38:04
6	Galloway Hills Rally (8 September)	2	Garry Pearson / Dale Bowen	Ford Fiesta R5	+0:45
6	Galloway Hills Rally (8 September)	3	Jonny Greer / Liam Regan	Ford Fiesta R5	+0:51

== Drivers Points Classification ==
Pos	Driver	Car	SNO	BCR	SSR	SCO	ARG	GSR	GHR	Points
1	Andrew Gallacher	Ford Focus WRC	1	-	~~8~~*	7	1	4	7	134
2	Donnie Macdonald	Ford Fiesta R5	3	-	6	5	2	6	Ret*	128
3	John Wink	Hyundai i20 R5	6	-	~~39~~*	4	5	8	3	124
4	Bruce McCombie	Mitsubishi Evo IX	7	-	7	6	3	5	DNS*	122
5	Mark McCulloch	Ford Fiesta R5/Subaru Impreza	12	-	4	2	Ret*	9	6	118
Pos	Driver	Car	SNO	BCR	SSR	SCO	ARG	GSR	GHR	Pts

Colour	Result
Gold	Winner
Silver	2nd place
Bronze	3rd place
Green	Non-podium finish
Purple	Did not finish (DNF)
Black	Disqualified (DSQ)
Blank	Did not start (DNS)
Blue	Nominated dropped points
*	Joker played

Points are awarded to the highest placed registered driver on each event as follows: 30, 28, 27, 26, and so on down to 1 point. At the end of the Championship, competitors will count their best 5 scores out of the 6 events as his/her final overall Championship score.
