= Anti-Scottish sentiment =

Anti-Scottish sentiment is disdain for, discrimination against or hatred of Scotland, Scottish people or Scottish culture. It may also include the persecution or oppression of the Scottish people as an ethnic group or nation. It can also be referred to as Scotophobia or Albaphobia.

== Middle Ages ==
Much of the anti-Scottish literature of the Middle Ages drew heavily on the writings from Greek and Roman antiquity. The writings of Ptolemy in the 2nd century AD in particular dominated concepts of Scotland till the Late Middle Ages and drew on stereotypes perpetuating fictitious, as well as satirical accounts of the Kingdom of the Scots. The English Church and the propaganda of royal writs from 1337 to 1453 encouraged a barbarous image of the kingdom as it allied with England's enemy, the Kingdom of France, during the Hundred Years' War. Medieval authors seldom visited Scotland but called on such accounts as "common knowledge", influencing the works of Hector Boece's "Scotorum Historiae" (Paris 1527) and William Camden's "Brittania" (London 1586) plagiarising and perpetuating negative attitudes. In the 16th century Scotland—particularly the Scottish Gaelic-speaking Highlands—was characterised as lawless, savage and filled with wild Scots. As seen in Camden's account to promote an image of the nation as a wild and barbarous people:

They drank the bloud [blood] out of wounds of the slain: they establish themselves, by drinking one anothers bloud [blood] and suppose the great number of slaughters they commit, the more honour they winne [win] and so did the Scythians in old time. To this we adde [add] that these wild Scots, like as the Scythians, had for their principall weapons, bowes and arrows. Camden (1586)

Camden's accounts were modified to compare the Highland Scots to the inhabitants of Ireland. Negative stereotypes flourished, and by 1634 the German author Martin Zeiler linked the origins of the Scots to the Scythians and in particular the Highlander to the Goths based on their wild and Gothic-like appearance. Quoting the 4th-century Roman historian Ammianus Marcellinus, he describes the Scots as descendants of the tribes of the British Isles who were unruly troublemakers. With a limited amount of information, the medieval geographer embellished such tales, including, less favourable assertions that the ancestors of Scottish people were cannibals. A spurious accusation proposed by Jerome's tales of Scythian atrocities was adapted to lay claims as evidence of cannibalism in Scotland. Despite the fact that there is no evidence of the ancestors of the Scots in ancient Gaul, moreover Jerome's text was a mistranslation of Attacotti, another tribe in Roman Britain, the myth of cannibalism was attributed to the people of Scotland:

What shall I [St. Jerome] say of other nations – how when I was in Gaul as a youth I saw the Scots, a British race, eating human flesh, and how, when these men came upon the forests upon herds of swine and sheep, and cattle, they would cut off the buttocks of the shepherds and paps of the woman and hold these for their greatest delicasy.

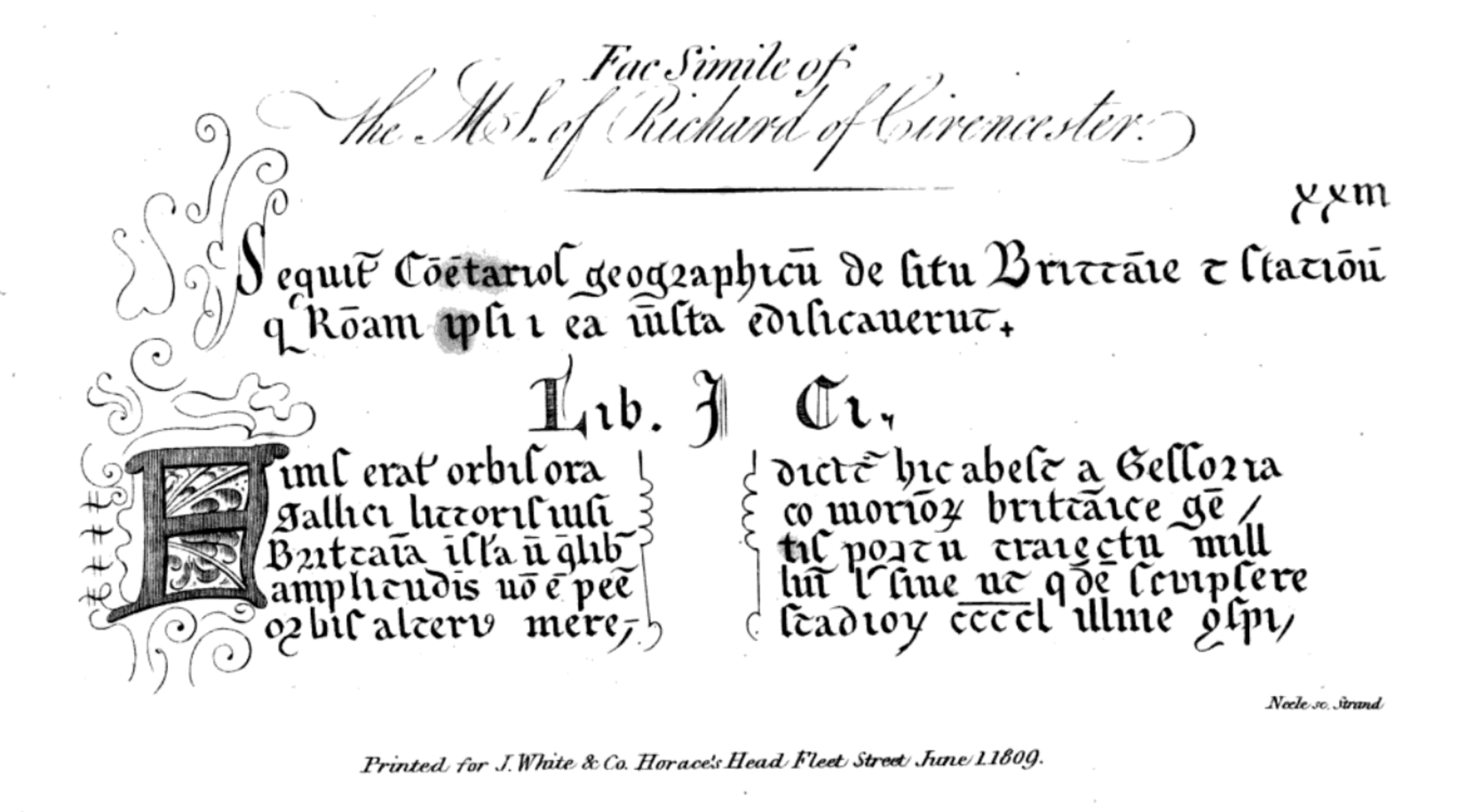
A part of the spurious De Situ Britanniae.

Accepted as fact with no evidence, such ideas were encouraged and printed as seen in De Situ Britanniae a fictitious account of the peoples and places of Roman Britain. It was published in 1757, after having been made available in London in 1749. Accepted as genuine for more than one hundred years, it was virtually the only source of information for northern Britain (i.e., modern Scotland) for the time period, and historians eagerly incorporated its spurious information into their own accounts of history. The Attacotti's homeland was specified as just north of the Firth of Clyde, near southern Loch Lomond, in the region of Dunbartonshire. This information was combined with legitimate historical mentions of the Attacotti to produce inaccurate histories and to make baseless conjectures. For example, Edward Gibbon combined De Situ Britanniae with St. Jerome's description of the Attacotti by musing on the possibility that a 'race of cannibals' had once dwelt in the neighbourhood of Glasgow.

These views were echoed in the works of Dutch, French and German authors. Nicolaus Hieronymus Gundling proposed that the exotic appearance and cannibalism of the Scottish people made them akin to the "savages" of Madagascar. Even as late as the mid-18th century, German authors likened Scotland and its ancient population to the exotic tribes of the South Seas. With the close political ties of the Franco-Scottish alliance in the late Medieval period, before William Shakespeare's Macbeth, English Elizabethan theatre dramatised the Scots and Scottish culture as comical, alien, dangerous and uncivilised. In comparison to the manner of Frenchmen who spoke a form of English, Scots were used in material for comedies; including Robert Greene's James IV in a fictitious English invasion of Scotland satirising the long Medieval wars with Scotland. English fears and hatred were deeply rooted in the contemporary fabric of society, drawing upon stereotypes as seen in Raphael Holinshed's Chronicles" and politically edged material such as George Chapman's Eastward Hoe in 1605, offended King James with its anti-Scottish satire, resulting in the imprisonment of the playwright. Despite this, the play was never banned or suppressed. Authors such as Claude Jordan de Colombier in 1697 plagiarised earlier works, Counter-Reformation propaganda associated the Scots and particularly Highland Gaelic-speakers as barbarians from the north who wore nothing but animal skins. Confirming old stereotypes relating back to Roman and Greek philosophers in the idea that "dark forces" from northern Europe (soldiers from Denmark, Sweden, Netherlands, France and Scotland) acquired a reputation as fierce warriors. With Lowland soldiers along the North Sea and Baltic Sea, as well as Highland mercenaries wearing the distinctive Scottish kilt, became synonymous with that of wild, rough and fierce fighting men.

However, the fact that Scots had married into every royal house in Europe who had also married into the Scottish royal house indicates that the supposed anti-Scottish sentiment there has been exaggerated as opposed to in England where the wars and raids in Northern England increased anti-Scottish sentiment. An increase in the English anti-Scottish sentiments after the Jacobite uprisings and the anti-Scottish bills of the parliament are clearly shown in comments by leaders in English such as Samuel Johnson, whose anti-Scottish remarks such as that "in those times nothing had been written in the Earse [i.e. Scots Gaelic] language" is well known.

== Anti-Highlander and anti-Jacobite sentiment ==
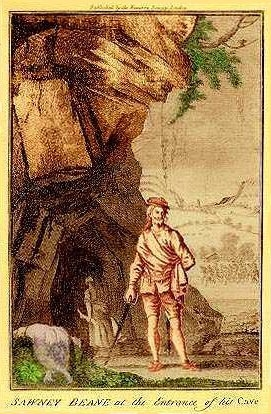
Sawney Beane at the Entrance of His Cave. published in the 1720s The Newgate Calendar caption: The woman in the background carries a severed leg.

Stereotypes of Highland cannibalism lasted till the mid-18th century and were embraced by Lowland Scots Presbyterian and English political and anti-Jacobite propaganda, in reaction to a series of Jacobite uprisings and rebellions, in the British Isles between 1688 and 1746. The Jacobite uprisings themselves in reaction to the Glorious Revolution of 1688, were aimed at returning James VII of Scotland and II of England, and later his descendants of the House of Stuart. Anti-Jacobite predominantly anti-Highland propaganda of the 1720s includes publications such as the London Newgate Calendar a popular monthly bulletin of executions, produced by the keeper of Newgate Prison in London. One Newgate publication created the legend of Sawney Bean, the head of a forty-eight strong clan of incestual, lawless and cannibalistic family in Galloway. Although based on fiction, the family was reported by the Calendar to have murdered and cannibalised over one thousand victims. Along with the Bible and John Bunyan's The Pilgrim's Progress, the Calendar was famously in the top three works most likely to be found in the average home and the Calendar's title was appropriated by other publications, who put out biographical chapbooks. With the intent to create a work of fiction to demonstrate the superiority of the Protestant mercantile establishment in contrast to the 'savage pro-Jacobite uncivilised Highland Gaels'.

From 1701 to 1720 a sustained Whig single party state campaign of anti-Jacobite pamphleteering across Britain and Ireland sought to halt Jacobitism as a political force and undermine the claim of James II and VII to the British throne. In 1705 Lowland Scots Protestant Whig politicians in the Scottish parliament voted to maintain a status quo and to award financial incentives of £4,800 to each writer having served the interests of the nation. Such measures had the opposite effect and furthered the Scots towards the cause, enabling Jacobitism to flourish as a sustained political presence in Scotland. Pro-Jacobite writings and pamphleteers, e.g. Walter Harries and William Sexton, were liable to imprisonment for producing seditious or scurrilous tracts; all works were seized or destroyed. Anti-Jacobite Pamphleteering, as an example An Address to All True Englishmen, routed a sustained propaganda war with Scotland's pro-Stuart supporters. British Whig campaigners pushed pro-Saxon and anti-Highlander Williamite satire, resulting in a backlash by pro-Jacobite pamphleteers.

From 1720 Lowland Scots Presbyterian Whiggish literature sought to remove the Highland Jacobite, being beyond the pale, or an enemy of John Bull or a unified Britain and Ireland as seen in Thomas Page's The Use of the Highland Broadsword published in 1746. Propaganda of the time included the minting of anti-Jacobite or anti-Highlander medals, and political cartoons to promote the Highland Scots as a barbaric and backward people, similar in style to the 19th-century depiction of the Irish as being backward or barbaric, in Lowland Scottish publications such as The Economist. Shakespeare's Macbeth was popularised and considered a pro-British, pro-Hanoverian and anti-Jacobite play. Prints such as Sawney in The Boghouse, itself a reference to the tale of Sawney Bean, depicted the Highland Scots as too stupid to use a lavatory and gave a particularly 18th-century edge to traditional depictions of cannibalism. The Highland Scots people were promoted as brutish thugs, figures of ridicule and no match for the "civilised" Lowland Scots supporters of the Protestant Hanovarians. They were feminised as a parody of the female disguise used by Bonny Prince Charlie in his escape, and as savage warriors that needed the guiding hand of the industrious Lowland Scots Protestants to render them civilised.

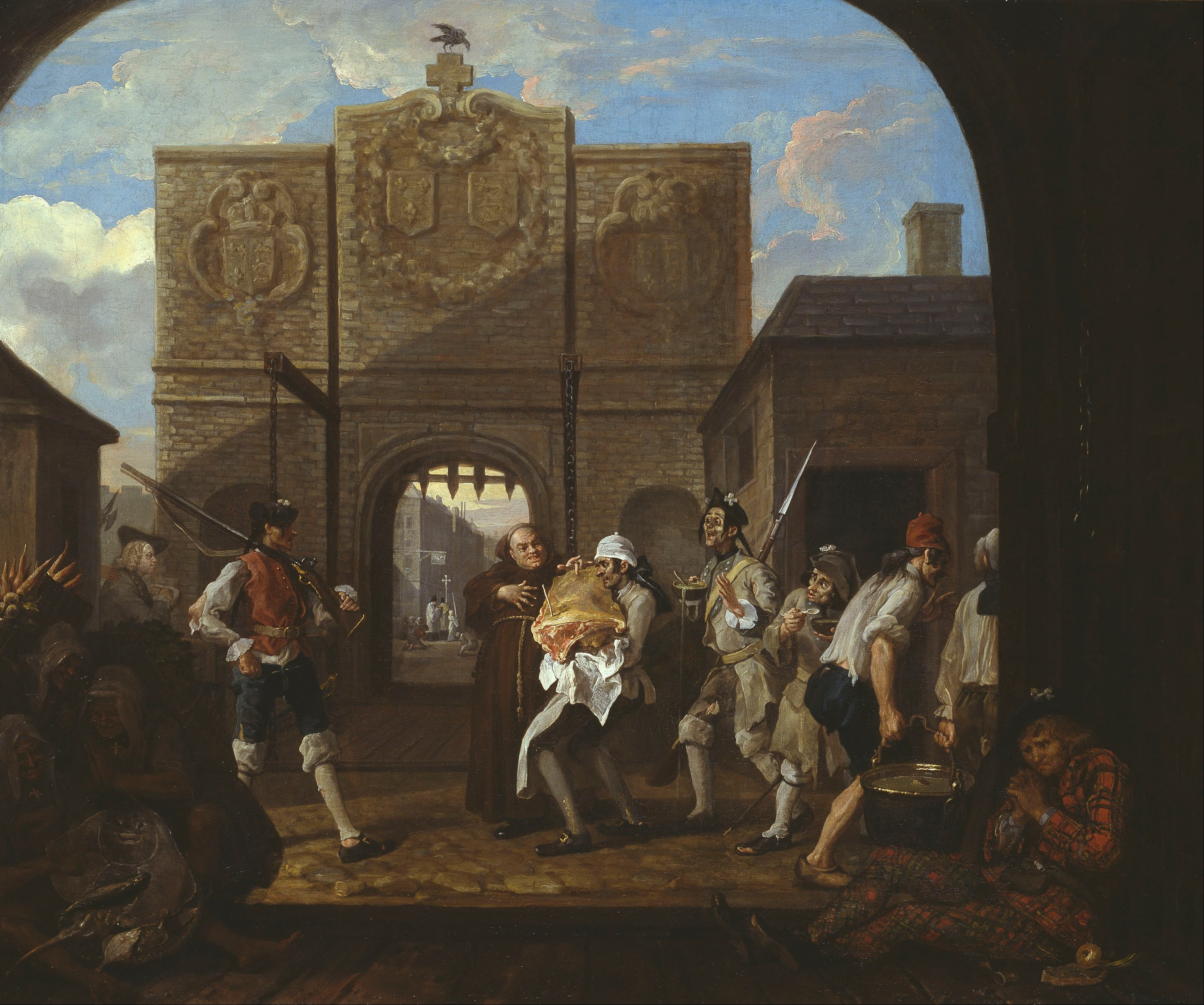
William Hogarth's Francophobic painting The Gate of Calais or O! The Roast Beef of Old England, in which in the foreground, a Highlander, an exile from the Jacobite rising of 1745, sits slumped against the wall, his strength sapped by the poor French fare – a raw onion and a crust of bread.

Depictions included the Highland Scots Jacobites as ill-dressed and ill-fed, loutish and verminous usually in league with the French as can be seen in William Hogarth's 1748 painting The Gate of Calais with a Highlander exile sits slumped against the wall, his strength sapped by the poor French fare – raw onion and a crust of bread. Political cartoons in 1762 depict the Prime Minister, Lord Bute (accused of being a Jacobite sympathiser), as a poor John Bull depicted with a bulls head with crooked horns ridden by Jacobite Scots taking bribes from a French monkey Anti-Jacobite sentiment was captured in a verse appended to various songs, including in its original form as an anti-Jacobite song Ye Jacobites By Name, God save the King with a prayer for the success of Field Marshal George Wade's army which attained some short-term use debatably in the late 18th century. This song was widely adopted and was to become the national anthem of Britain now known as "God Save the King" (but never since sung with that verse).

Lord, grant that Marshal Wade,
May by thy mighty aid,
Victory bring.
May he sedition hush,
And like a torrent rush,
Rebellious Scots to crush,
God save the King.

The 1837 article and other sources make it clear that this verse was not used soon after 1745, and certainly, before the song became accepted as the British national anthem in the 1780s and 1790s. On the opposing side, Jacobite beliefs were demonstrated in an alternative verse used during the same period, attacking Lowland Scots Presbyterianism:

God bless the prince, I pray,
God bless the prince, I pray,
Charlie I mean;
That Scotland we may see
Freed from vile Presbyt'ry,
Both George and his Feckie,
Ever so, Amen.

== Modern day ==
There have been a number of attacks on Scots in England in the 21st century. In 2004 a Scottish former soldier was attacked by a group of children, teenagers, and young adults with bricks and bats, allegedly for having a Scottish accent. In Aspatria, Cumbria, a group of Scottish schoolgirls say they received anti-Scottish taunts and foul language from a group of teenage girls during a carnival parade. An English football supporter was banned for life for shouting "Kill all the Jocks" before attacking Scottish football fans. One Scottish woman says she was forced to move from her home in England because of anti-Scottish feeling, while another had a haggis thrown through her front window. In 2008 a student nurse from London was fined for assault and hurling anti-Scottish abuse at police while drunk during the T in the Park festival in Kinross.

== In politics and media ==
In 2007, numerous Scottish members of Parliament (MPs) warned of increasing anti-Scottish sentiment in England, citing the increased tension over devolution, the West Lothian question and the Barnett formula as causes.

In June 2019, an anti-Scottish poem titled Friendly Fire was recirculated on the internet, leading to criticism of Boris Johnson, who was, at the time, in contention to become prime minister of the United Kingdom. The poem was written by James Michie and published in The Spectator magazine in 2004 by Johnson, who was its editor at the time. In the poem, Michie (of Scottish descent himself) describes Scots as a "verminous race" and suggests Scotland merits "not merely isolation, but comprehensive extermination." In Michie's 2007 obituary titled "James Michie, gentle genius", Johnson dubbed Michie "one of the most distinguished poets and translators of the 20th century" and referred to Friendly Fire as an example of how he wrote "whimsically, sometimes with bite." (Note: Also published in The Spectator)

Johnson has himself expressed anti-Scottish prejudice. In a 2012 interview with the Huffington Post, he stated "A pound spent in Croydon is of far more value to the country than a pound spent in Strathclyde." While editor of The Spectator, in a 2005 diary piece regarding the possibility of then-chancellor Gordon Brown succeeding Tony Blair as prime minister, Johnson wrote:

"That would be utterly outrageous, not just because he is a gloomadon-popping, interfering, high-taxing complicator of life, but mainly because he is a Scot, and government by a Scot is just not conceivable in the current constitutional context."

The term Scottish mafia is used pejoratively to refer to a group of Scottish Labour Party politicians and broadcasters, who are perceived as having had unfair influence over the governance of England, such as the constitutional arrangement allowing Scottish MPs to vote on English matters, but not vice versa. The term has found use in the British press and in parliamentary debates. Members of this group include Tony Blair, Gordon Brown, Alistair Darling, Charles Falconer, Derry Irvine, Michael Martin and John Reid.

An edition of the BBC panel show Have I Got News for You aired on 26 April 2013 prompted over 100 complaints to the BBC and Ofcom for its perceived anti-Scottish stance, during a section discussing Scottish independence. Panelist Paul Merton had suggested Mars bars would become the currency of a post-independence Scotland, while guest host Ray Winstone added: "To be fair, the Scottish economy has its strengths – its chief exports being oil, whisky, tartan and tramps."

In July 2006, Kelvin MacKenzie, a former editor of The Sun (and who is of Scottish descent himself) wrote a column referring to Scots as "Tartan Tosspots" and mocking the fact that Scotland has a lower life expectancy than the rest of the United Kingdom. MacKenzie's column provoked a storm of Scottish protest and was heavily condemned by numerous commentators, including Scottish MPs and members of the Scottish Parliament (MSPs). In October 2007, MacKenzie appeared on the BBC's Question Time TV programme and launched another attack on Scotland, claiming that:

Scotland believes not in entrepreneurialism like London and the south east… Scots enjoy spending [money] but they don't enjoy creating it, which is the opposite to down south.

In 2015, the Conservative Party MP Lucy Frazer was forced to apologise after criticism for her joke on the floor of the House of Commons that Scots should be sold as slaves to solve the "Lothian question."

Also in 2015, a cartoon published in The Guardian featuring the Scottish nationalist politicians Nicola Sturgeon and Alex Salmond by the satirist Steve Bell, featuring the line that they would defend Scots' core right to "practise incest", was widely decried as "racist" and anti-Scottish. Similarly, a 2024 cartoon in The Telegraph by the satirist Peter Brookes depicting Sturgeon, Humza Yousaf and Peter Murrell being crucified was criticised as anti-Scottish in many quarters.

== See also ==
- Scottish cringe
- Scottish national identity
