= James Michie =

English poet, translator and editor

James Crain Michie /ˈmɪki/ (24 June 1927 – 30 October 2007) was an English poet, translator and editor, of Scottish and American descent.

== Early life ==
Michie was born in Weybridge, Surrey, one of the three sons of James Kilgour Michie and his American wife Marjorie Crain Pfeiffer. His father was a banker and East India merchant, originally from Falkland, Fife, in Scotland.

Michie was educated at Marlborough College and Trinity College, Oxford, where he held an exhibition in Classics but took a BA in English literature. Instead of undertaking National Service, he was accepted as a conscientious objector and spent two years with the International Voluntary Service for Peace, during which he helped to build refugee housing in Bavaria and Jamaica. He was also a porter at Guy's Hospital.

Michie then joined John Lehmann's The London Magazine and the Workers' Educational Association, beginning a career in publishing.

His younger brother Donald Michie became a researcher in artificial intelligence. Their oldest brother, Ian, became a banker.

== Translator and poet ==
The texts that Michie translated included The Odes of Horace, The Art of Love by Ovid, The Poems of Catullus, The Epigrams of Martial and selections from La Fontaine's and Aesop's fables. He was the editorial director of The Bodley Head, a British publishing company, and lecturer at London University. His Collected Poems won the 1995 Hawthornden Prize.

Beginning in the 1970s, Michie devised and judged literary competitions for The Spectator under the pen-name of Jaspistos.

He caused controversy in 2004 when his poem, "Friendly Fire," was published in The Spectator under then-editor Boris Johnson.

== Personal life ==
In 1950 Michie married firstly Daphne Segré, and they were divorced in 1960. In 1964, he married secondly Sarah Courtauld. They had two sons and a daughter, and were divorced. Michie also had a son with Lady Clare Asquith, a daughter of Julian Asquith, 2nd Earl of Oxford and Asquith, and a daughter with Tatiana Orlov.

== Selected publications ==
- Oxford Poetry 1949 (Oxford: Basil Blackwell, 1949, co-editor, with Kingsley Amis)
- Possible Laughter (London: Rupert Hart-Davis, 1959, verse)
- Odes of Horace (London: Rupert Hart-Davis, 1964, translations)
  - The Odes of Horace, new edition illustrated by Elisabeth Frink (London: Folio Society, 1988)
- The Poems of Catullus (London: Rupert Hart-Davis, 1969, translations)
- La Fontaine Selected Fables (London: Viking Press, 1979)
- New and Selected Poems (London: Chatto & Windus, 1983) ISBN 978-0701127237
- Oxford Book of Short Poems (Oxford University Press, 1985, co-editor, with P. J. Kavanagh) ISBN 978-0192141354
- Aesop's Fables retold in verse, illustrated by John Vernon Lord (London: Jonathon Cape, 1989) ISBN 978-0224025874
- Collected Poems (London: Sinclair-Stevenson Ltd, 1994) ISBN 978-1856193160
- Last Poems, with foreword by Richard Ingrams (Oldie Publications, 2008) ISBN 978-0954817657

== Awards ==
- Hawthornden Prize (1995)
