= Sawney Bean =

Legendary 16th-century Scottish cannibal

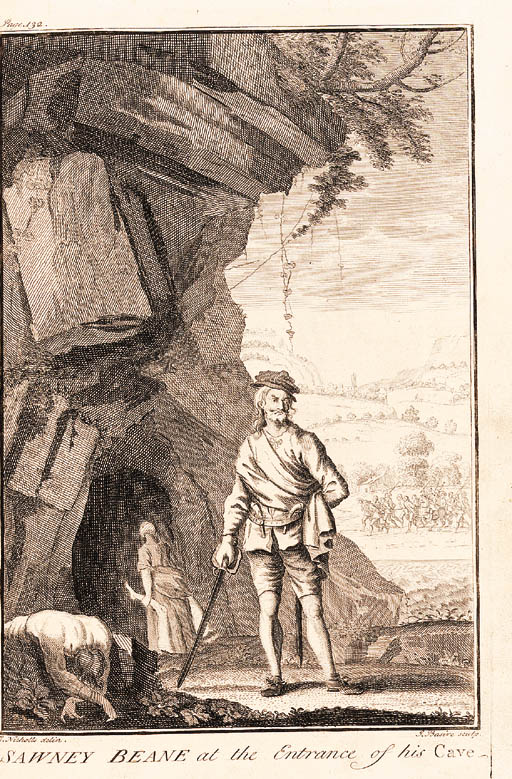
- Sawney Bean at the Entrance of His Cave. Note the woman in the background, carrying two disembodied legs, and the dead body nearby.
- Born: Alexander Bean; 1500s to 1600s East Lothian, Scotland
- Other name: Sawney
- Spouse: Agnes "Black" Douglas
- Children: 14
- Penalty: Death

Details
- Victims: 1,000+
- Country: Scotland

Alexander "Sawney" Bean (sometimes also given as Sandy Bane, etc.) is a legendary figure, said to have been the head of a 45-member clan in Scotland in the 16th century that murdered and cannibalised over 1,000 people in 25 years. According to the legend, Bean and his clan members were eventually caught by a search party sent by King James VI, and were executed for their heinous crimes.

The story appeared in The Newgate Calendar, a sensationalised crime catalogue loosely connected with Newgate Prison in London. It has since passed into folklore and become a part of the Edinburgh tourism circuit.

== Legend ==
According to The Newgate Calendar, a popular London publication of the 18th and 19th centuries, Alexander Bean was born in East Lothian during the 16th century. His father was a ditch-digger and hedge-trimmer; Bean tried to take up the family trade but quickly realised that he was not fit for the work.

He left home with an allegedly vicious woman named 'Black' Agnes Douglas, who apparently shared his inclinations and was accused of being a witch. After some robbing and the cannibalisation of one of their victims, the couple ended up at a coastal cave in Bennane Head between Girvan and Ballantrae. The cave was 200 yards (180 metres) deep and the entrance was blocked by water during high tide, enabling the couple to live there undiscovered for some 25 years.

The pair produced six daughters, eight sons, 14 granddaughters, and 18 grandsons. The grandchildren were said to be products of incest between their children.

Lacking the inclination for regular work, the Bean clan thrived by laying careful ambushes at night to rob and murder individuals or small groups. They brought the bodies back to their cave, where the corpses were dismembered and eaten. They would pickle the leftovers and discarded body parts in barrels; these leftovers would sometimes wash up on nearby beaches. This strategy helped conceal their crimes by leading villagers to believe that animals were responsible for the attacks on travellers.

The body parts and disappearances did not go unnoticed, but the clan stayed in their cave by day and took their victims at night. Thus, the villagers remained for a time unaware of the murderers living nearby.

Once local people began to take notice of the disappearances, searches were launched to find the culprits. One such took note of the cave, but the searchers did not believe any human could live in it. Frustrated and desperate for justice, the townspeople hanged several innocents, but the disappearances continued. Suspicion often fell on local innkeepers, since, in many cases, they were the last known to have seen the missing people alive.

One night, the Bean clan ambushed a married couple riding from a fair on one horse. The man, trained in combat and armed with sword and pistol, was able to hold the clan off. The unfortunate wife was unhorsed, fell to the ground and was captured, meeting a hideous fate. The husband was rescued when a large group of fair-goers appeared on the trail and the Beans fled. He was taken to the local magistrate, who was then informed of the events.

With the Beans' existence revealed, it was not long before the king (perhaps James VI of Scotland, in accounts linked to the 16th century, though this detail does not fit well with the story being linked to the 15th century) heard of the atrocities and led a posse of 400 men and several bloodhounds. The bloodhounds soon led them to the previously overlooked cave. Upon entering it by torchlight, the searchers found the Bean clan surrounded by human remains: body parts hanging from the walls, barrels filled with limbs, and piles of stolen heirlooms and jewellery.

There are two versions of the events following the Bean clan's discovery. The more common is that the clan was captured alive, having given up without a fight. They were taken in chains to the Tolbooth Jail in Edinburgh, then transferred to either Leith or Glasgow, where they were summarily executed, being regarded as subhuman and unfit for trial. Sawney and the other men had their genitalia cut off and thrown into the fires, their hands and feet were severed, and they were allowed to bleed to death. Sawney shouted his dying words: "It isn't over, it will never be over". After watching the men die, Agnes, the other women and the children were tied to stakes and burned alive. These punishments recall—in essence if not in detail—the medieval hanging, drawing and quartering decreed for men convicted of treason; women convicted of the same would be burned. The second version is that the search party detonated gunpowder at the entrance of their cave, leaving the Bean clan to suffocate.

The town of Girvan, located near the macabre scene of murder and debauchery, has another legend about the Bean clan. It says that one of Bean's daughters eventually left the clan and settled in Girvan where she planted a tree that became known as "The Hairy Tree". After her family's capture and exposure, her identity was revealed and angry locals hanged her from a bough of the Hairy Tree.

== Sources and veracity ==
There is debate over the validity of the Sawney Bean tale. Some assert that Sawney Bean was a real person, while others consider him a mythical figure. Dorothy L. Sayers offered a gruesome account of the tale in her fiction anthology Great Short Stories of Detection, Mystery and Horror (Gollancz, 1928). The book was a best-seller in Britain, and was reprinted seven times in the next five years. In a 2005 article, Sean Thomas notes that historical documents, such as newspapers and diaries during the era in which Sawney Bean was supposedly active, make no mention of ongoing disappearances of hundreds of people. Additionally, he notes inconsistencies in the stories, but speculates that kernels of truth might have inspired the legend. There are contradicting beliefs as to when the alleged atrocities occurred. Thomas explains that, while many believe Sawney Bean's campaign took place during the 16th century, others place it centuries earlier. Thomas also believes it likely that the legend was embellished and altered over time to make it more relevant to readers, and more salacious.

The Sawney Bean legend closely resembles the story of Christie Cleek, attested from the early 15th century, a mythical Scottish cannibal said to have lived during a famine in the mid-14th century.

The legend of Sawney Bean first appeared in British chapbooks (a type of printed street literature). Many today argue that the story served as political propaganda to denigrate the Scots after the Jacobite risings. Thomas disagrees, arguing: "If the Sawney Bean story is to be read as deliberately anti-Scottish, how do we explain the equal emphasis on English criminals in the same publications? Wouldn't such an approach rather blunt the point?" (See also "Sawney" for this theory.)

A broadside from circa 1750 mentions "the Scottish traditional story of Sandy Bane" as it relates to a report of a murderer who had been eating live cats.

Another cannibal story from Scotland, even more redolent of the Sawney Bean tale than the Christie Cleek story, can be found in the 1696 work of Nathaniel Crouch, a compiler and popular-history writer who published under the pseudonym "Richard Burton". He tells the following tale, which allegedly happened in 1459, the year before the death of James II of Scotland:

... about which time a certain thief who lived privately in a den, with his wife and children, were all burned alive, they having made it their practice for many years to kill young people and eat them; one girl only of a year old was saved, and brought up at Dundee, who at twelve years of age being found guilty of the same horrid crime, was condemned to the same punishment, and when the people followed her in great multitudes to execution, wondering at her unnatural villainy, she turned toward them, and with a cruel countenance said, "What do you thus rail at me, as if I had done such an heinous act, contrary to the nature of man? I tell you that if you did but know how pleasant the taste of man's flesh was, none of you all would forbear to eat it;" and thus with an impenitent and stubborn mind she suffered deserved death.

Hector Boece notes that the daughter of a Scottish brigand, who was executed with the rest of his family for cannibalism, was raised by foster parents but still developed the cannibal appetite at 12, and was put to death for it. This was summarized by George M. Gould and Walter Pyle in Anomalies and Curiosities of Medicine.

== Popular culture ==
- English musician James Sanderson composed Sawney Bean's Song Sung by Mr. Helme, in Harlequin Highlander, or Sawney Bean's Cave and Written by Mr Cross in 1798. It was reviewed in the Monthly Magazine in November 1798 as ″very properly composed in the Scotch style″.
- The controversial film Themroc (1973), reworks elements of the story of Sawney Bean, setting them in contemporary Paris; cannibalism, incest, cave-dwelling (the protagonist degenerates his apartment into a cliff-top cave dwelling), resistance to authority, and ultimately being bricked up and left to die.
- American filmmaker Wes Craven used Sawney Bean as the inspiration for his 1977 film The Hills Have Eyes.
- Off Season, written by Jack Ketchum, is loosely based on the legend of Sawney Bean and his clan. The story takes place in Dead River, Maine.
- English musician Snakefinger closed his final album, Night of Desirable Objects by Snakefinger's Vestal Virgins (released in 1987), with the two-part song "The Ballad of Sawney Bean/Sawney's Death Dance." The first part is an a cappella telling of the story in three eight-line verses, while the second is an instrumental led by Snakefinger's violin.
- Harlan Ellison's story She's a Young Thing and Cannot Leave Her Mother (Pulphouse: The Hardback Magazine, Fall 1988) tells the story of a drifter who meets descendants of the Sawney Bean clan.
- The novel The Ballad of Sawney Bain (Polygon, 1990) by Harry Tait was a "kind of historiographic metafiction retelling of the tale of Sawney Bean". In 1990, it was awarded the Saltire Society's award for Scottish First Book of the Year.
- Canadian Celtic punk band The Real McKenzies included Sawney Beane Clan in their 1995 self-titled debut album.
- In the children's book The Day I Swapped My Dad for Two Goldfish by Neil Gaiman and Dave McKean, the two goldfish are named "Sawney" and "Beany"
- Death metal band Deeds of Flesh's 1998 album Inbreeding the Anthropophagi has its main lyrical concept based on the legend of Sawney Bean, his inbred, cave-dwelling family, and their grisly practice of attacking travelers on local roads for food and profit.
- In the Image Comics series Hack/Slash, the main character Vlad (a.k.a. "The Meatman Killer") is eventually revealed to be a descendant of Sawney Bean.
- Sawney Bean's tale is mentioned in the fantasy novella "The Monarch of the Glen", included in the anthology Fragile Things by Neil Gaiman. The story, set after the events of American Gods, sees the character Shadow travelling to Scotland.
- Madhouse, the third installment of Rob Thurman's Cal Leandros book series, portrays Sawney Bean as the main antagonist. He is depicted in the story as a Redcap, which is a malevolent goblin from Anglo-Scottish folklore.
- In the Japanese manga and anime series Attack on Titan, Hange Zoë recounts the tale of a cannibalistic clan to two captured Titans. They end the tale by naming the two Titans "Sawney" and "Bean".
- In 2022, the German folk metal band Vogelfrey published their album Titanium featuring a song named after and about Sawney Bean.
