= Christie Cleek =

British cannibal

Christie Cleek (or o'-the-Cleek, of-the-Cleek, Chwsten Cleek or Criste Cleik) was a legendary Scottish cannibal reported to have used his skills as a butcher to slaughter people. He is said to have lived during a severe famine in the fourteenth century. His story shares some similarities with the better-known legend of Sawney Bean, but it is older.

== Folklore ==
According to folklore, his real name was Andrew Christie, a butcher from Perth. Cleek, the name by which he is remembered, means 'hook' or 'crook' in Scots, alluding to the iron hook he reportedly used to hang up his victims, or alternatively, used to drag passing horsemen off their saddles. During a severe famine in the mid-fourteenth century, Christie joined a group of scavengers in the foothills of the Grampians. When one of the party died of starvation, Christie butchered the corpse to provide food for his companions.

The group developed a taste for human flesh as, under Christie's leadership, they began to ambush travellers in the passes of the Grampians, feeding on their bodies and those of their horses. It is alleged that before attacking, Christie would haul his victims from their mounts with a hook on a rod. Thirty riders apparently died at Christie's hands. Eventually, the company was defeated by an armed force from Perth. Some stories record that he was publicly executed alongside his accomplices, whilst others state that Christie escaped and changed his name to David Maxwell. It is said that he then married, became a rich merchant in Dumfries, fathered three daughters, and had a good reputation within the community. He had told his neighbours that his only brother was a victim to Christie Cleek, and only admitted his crimes on his death bed.

The earliest versions of this narrative are much less detailed, recording only Christie's cannibalism and his methods of trapping prey. No mention is made of his accomplices or eventual fate.

Cheviot's Proverbs (1896) mentions some folklore about the character, who came to be known as a bugbear or bogeyman:

They resorted to cannibalism at the instigation of their leader, Andrew Christie, a Perth butcher. This monster lay in wait for passing horsemen, and dragged them from the saddle with a large iron hook fixed to a long pole, hence his nickname. It is said Christiecleek died many years after, a married man and prosperous merchant in Dumfries. For centuries the mere mention of the word Christiecleek was sufficient to silence the noisiest child.

== Comparison with Sawney Bean ==
Christie's story shares some similarities with the legend of Sawney Bean. While Bean far exceeds his counterpart in terms of notoriety, the Christie legend appears to be older. Tales of the Bean family do not appear before the 18th century, but Christie's exploits are documented from the 15th century onwards. For instance, Andrew of Wyntoun's Orygynale Cronykil of Scotland (c. 1420) refers to a figure called "Chwsten Cleek" who, during a time of "sae great default...that mony were in hunger dead', set up traps with the intent 'children and women for to slay,/ And swains that he might over-ta;/ And ate them all that he get might". A little later, in an entry for 1341, Holinshed's Chronicles (c.1577) reports:

In the same year (as some do write) or (according unto other) in the year following, there was such a miserable death, both through England and Scotland, that the people were driven to eat the flesh of horses, dogs, cats, and such like unused kinds of meats, to sustain their languishing lives with all, yea, in so much that (as is said) there was a Scottish man, an uplandish fellow named Tristicloke, spared not to steal children, and to kill women, on whose flesh he fed, as if he had been a wolf.

== In popular culture ==
The novel The Bogeyman Chronicles, by Glasgow-based author Craig Watson, is based on the legend of Christie Cleek.

== See also ==
- Cannibalism in Europe
- The Jarmans of Colnbrook
- Sweeney Todd
