= Bennane Head =

Tapering piece of land formed of hard rock in South Ayrshire, Scotland

- Headland
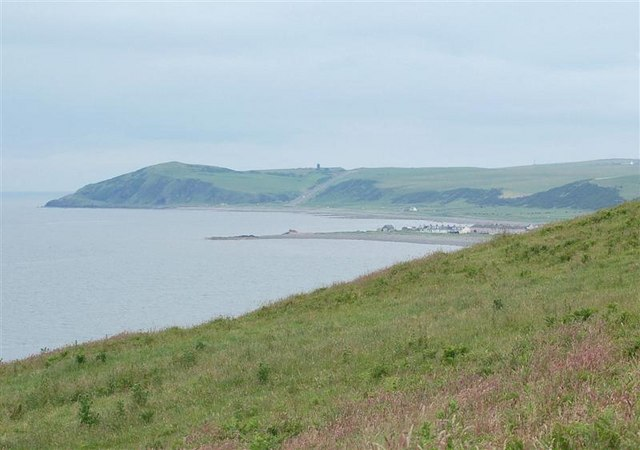
- Towards Bennane Head Looking NNE from the edge of Downan Hill, towards Bennane Head and Ballantrae. 2007. Photo: Mary and Angus Hogg

- Coordinates: 55°8′16″N 4°59′47″W
- Grid position: NX 09105 86702

Bennane Head is a tapering piece of land formed of hard rock, projecting into the Firth of Clyde, in South Ayrshire, west of Scotland. At the northern end of Ballantrae Bay, 17 kilometres (11 mi) southwest of Girvan. A 200-metre-deep (660 ft) cave in the cliff under the headland is said to be the place where the cannibal Sawney Bean and his family lived in the 16th century.

== Gallery ==
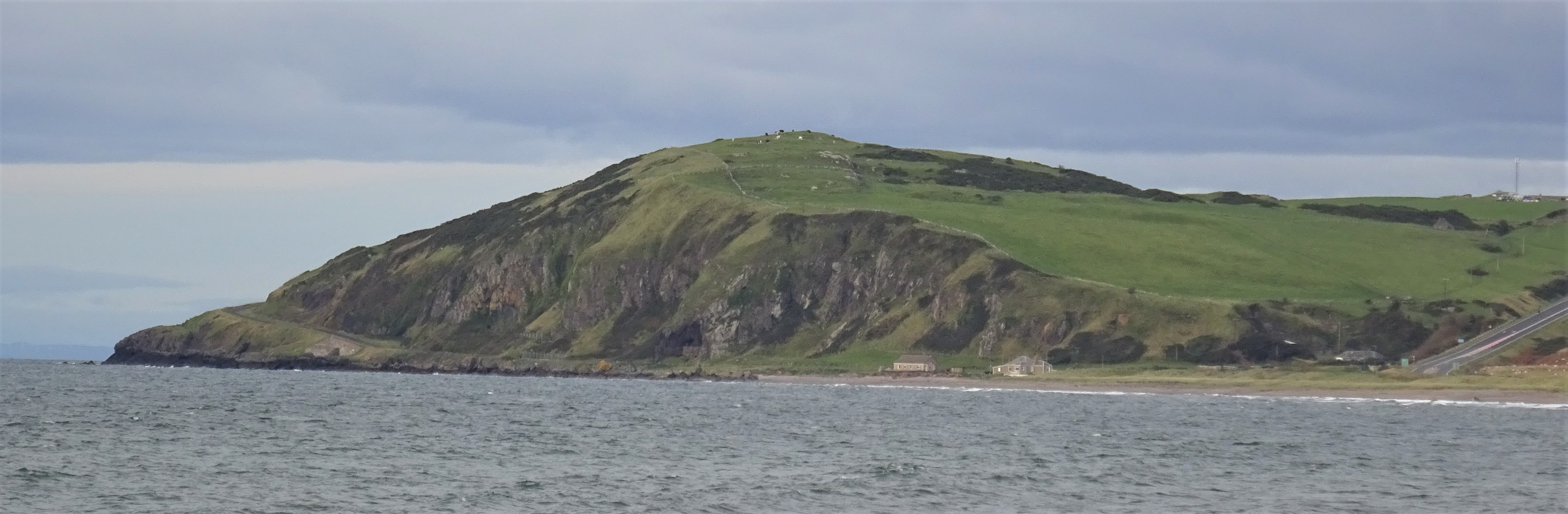
Bennane Head from Ballantrae, South Ayrshire
