= John Bull =

National personification of England

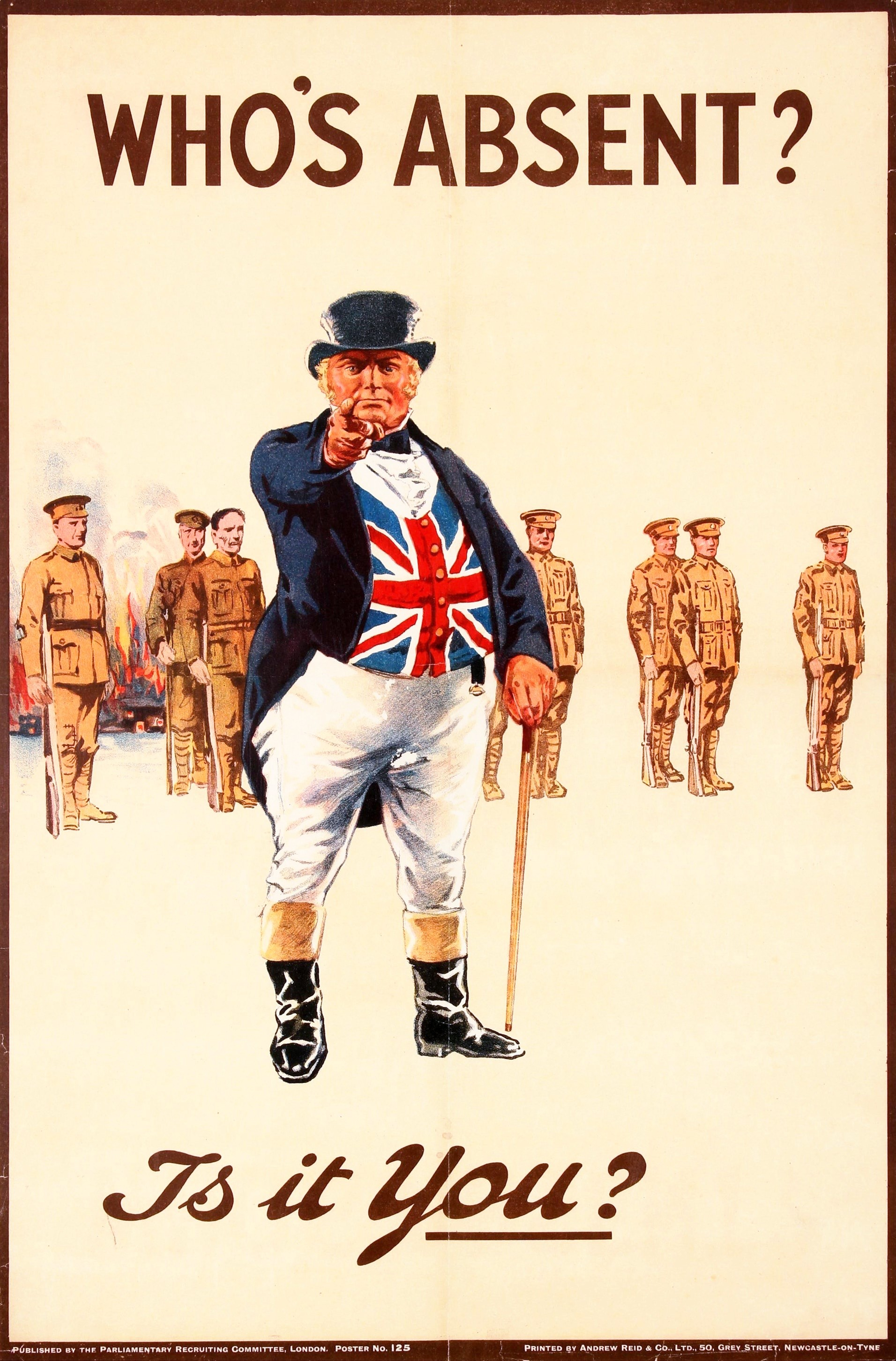
World War I recruitment poster

John Bull is a national personification of England, especially in political cartoons and similar graphic works. He is usually depicted as a stout, middle-aged, country-dwelling, jolly and matter-of-fact man. He originated in satirical works of the early-18th century and would come to stand for English liberty in opposition to revolutionaries. He was popular through the 18th and 19th centuries until the time of the First World War, when he generally stopped being seen as representative of the "common man". Sometimes he may be used to represent Great Britain.

== Origin ==
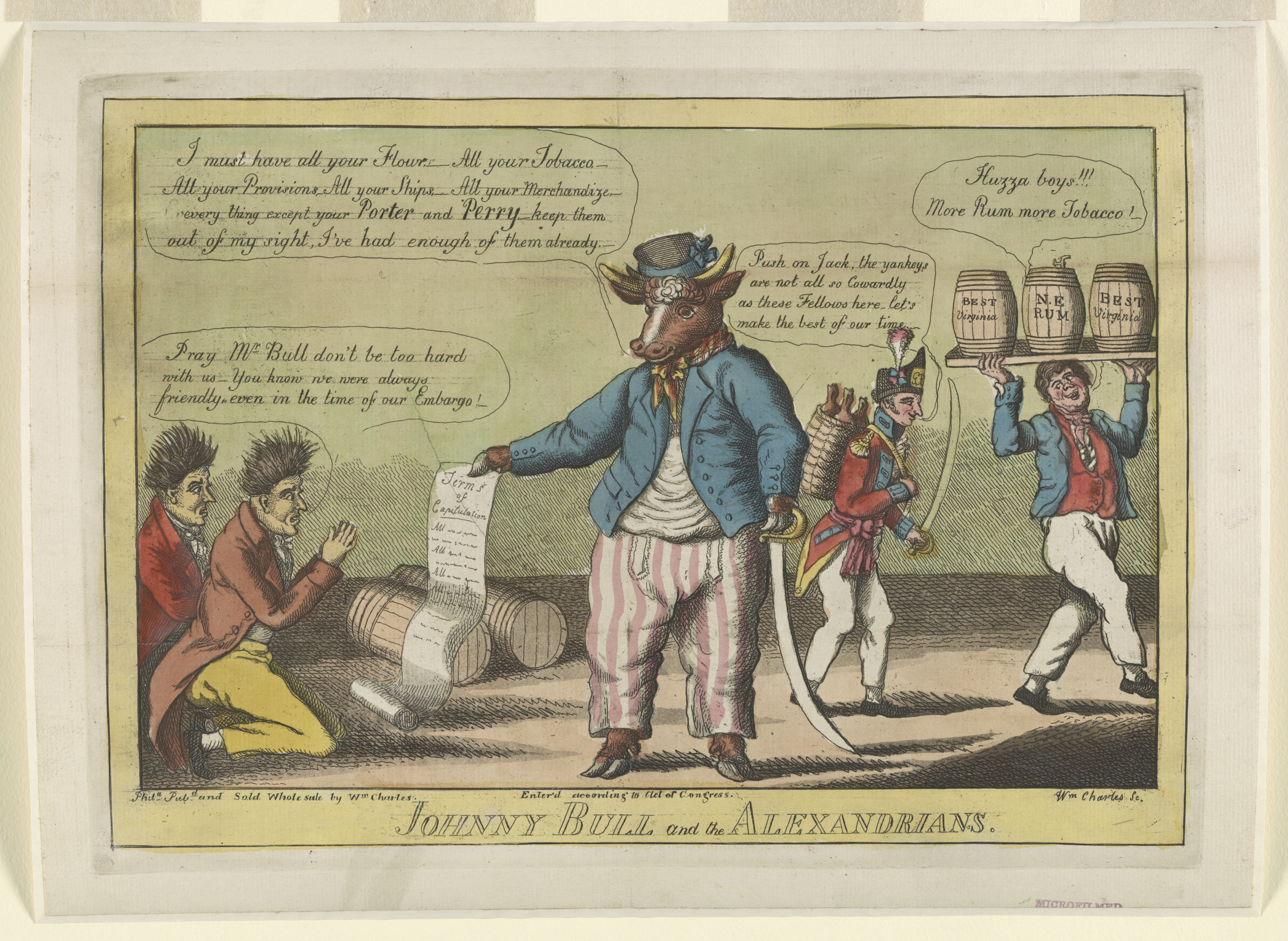
An earlier John Bull in which he is depicted as an anthropomorphic bull

John Bull originated as a satirical character created by John Arbuthnot, a friend of Jonathan Swift and Alexander Pope. Bull first appeared in 1712 in Arbuthnot's pamphlet Law is a Bottomless Pit. The same year Arbuthnot published a four-part political narrative The History of John Bull. In this satirical treatment of the War of the Spanish Succession, John Bull brings a lawsuit against various figures intended to represent the kings of France (Louis Baboon) and Spain (Lord Strutt), as well as institutions both foreign and domestic. The allegory was intended primarily as an attack against the Whigs, their foreign policy and their financiers who were profiting from the war. In Arbuthnot's work John Bull personifies England while his sister Peg symbolises his native Scotland.

William Hogarth and other British writers made Bull, originally derided, "a heroic archetype of the freeborn Englishman." Later, the figure of Bull was disseminated overseas by illustrators and writers such as the American cartoonist Thomas Nast and the Irish writer George Bernard Shaw, author of John Bull's Other Island.

Starting in the 1760s Bull was portrayed as an Anglo-Saxon country-dweller. He was almost always depicted in a waistcoat and a simple frock coat (in the past navy blue, but more recently with the Union Jack colours). Britannia, or a lion, is sometimes used as an alternative in some editorial cartoons.

As a literary figure, John Bull is well-intentioned, frustrated, full of common sense, and entirely of native country stock. Unlike Uncle Sam later, he is not a figure of authority but rather a yeoman who prefers his small beer and domestic peace, possessed of neither patriarchal power nor heroic defiance. Arbuthnot provided him with a sister named Peg (Scotland), and a traditional adversary in Louis Baboon (the House of Bourbon in France). Peg continued in pictorial art beyond the 18th century, but the other figures associated with the original tableau dropped away. John Bull himself continued to frequently appear as a national symbol in posters and cartoons as late as the First World War.

== Depiction ==
Bull is usually depicted as a stout man in a tailcoat with light-coloured breeches and a top hat which, by its shallow crown, indicates its middle-class identity. During the Georgian period his waistcoat is red and/or his tailcoat is royal blue which, together with his buff or white breeches, can thus refer to a greater or lesser extent to the "blue and buff" scheme; this was used by supporters of Whig politics, which was part of what John Arbuthnot wished to deride when he created and designed the character. By the twentieth century, however, his waistcoat nearly always depicts a Union Flag, and his coat is generally dark blue. (Otherwise, however, his clothing still echoes the fashions of the Regency period.) He wears a low topper (sometimes called a John Bull topper) and is often accompanied by a bulldog. Bull has been used in a variety of different advertising campaigns over the years, and is a common sight in British editorial cartoons of the 19th and early 20th centuries. The singer David Bowie wore a coat in the style of Bull.

Washington Irving described him in his chapter entitled "John Bull" from The Sketch Book:

...[A] plain, downright, matter-of-fact fellow, with much less of poetry about him than rich prose. There is little of romance in his nature, but a vast deal of a strong natural feeling. He excels in humour more than in wit; is jolly rather than gay; melancholy rather than morose; can easily be moved to a sudden tear or surprised into a broad laugh; but he loathes sentiment and has no turn for light pleasantry. He is a boon companion, if you allow him to have his humour and to talk about himself; and he will stand by a friend in a quarrel with life and purse, however soundly he may be cudgelled.

The cartoon image of stolid, stocky, conservative and well-meaning John Bull, dressed like an English country squire, sometimes explicitly contrasted with the conventionalised scrawny, French revolutionary sans-culottes Jacobin, was developed from about 1790 by the British satirical artists James Gillray, Thomas Rowlandson and Isaac Cruikshank. (An earlier national personification was Sir Roger de Coverley, from a 1711 edition of The Spectator.)

A more negative portrayal of John Bull occurred in the cartoons drawn by the Egyptian nationalist journalist Yaqub Sanu in his popular underground newspaper Abu-Naddara Zarqa in the late 19th and early 20th centuries. Sanu's cartoons depicted John Bull as a coarse, ignorant drunken bully who pushed around ordinary Egyptians while stealing all the wealth of Egypt. Much of Sanu's humour revolved around John Bull's alcoholism, his crass rudeness, his ignorance about practically everything except alcohol, and his inability to properly speak French (the language of the Egyptian elite), which he hilariously mangled unlike the Egyptian characters who spoke proper French.

Likewise, the musician, playwright and Irish Republican Dominic Behan criticised the British government via the proxy of John Bull in his popular ballad, "The Patriot Game":

This Ireland of mine has for long been half free,
Six counties are under John Bull's tyranny.
And still de Valera is greatly to blame
For shirking his part in the patriot game.

Increasingly through the early twentieth century, John Bull became seen as not particularly representative of "the common man," and during the First World War this function was largely taken over by the figure of Tommy Atkins. According to Alison Light, during the interwar years the nation abandoned "formerly heroic... public rhetorics of national destiny" in favour of "an Englishness at once less imperial and more inward-looking, more domestic and more private". Consequently, John Bull was replaced by Sidney Strube's suburban Little Man as the personification of the nation. Some saw John Bull's replacement by the Little Man as symbolic of Britain's post-First World War decline; W. H. Auden's 1937 poem "Letter to Lord Byron" favourably contrasted John Bull to the Little Man. Auden wrote:

Ask the cartoonist first, for he knows best.
Where is the John Bull of the good old days,
The swaggering bully with the clumsy jest?
His meaty neck has long been laid to rest,
His acres of self-confidence for sale;
He passed away at Ypres and Passchendaele.

John Bull's surname is also reminiscent of the alleged fondness of the English for beef, reflected in the French nickname for English people, les rosbifs, which translates as "the 'Roast Beefs.'" It is also reminiscent of the animal, and for that reason Bull is portrayed as "virile, strong, and stubborn," like a bull.

A typical John Bull Englishman is referenced in Margaret Fuller's Summer on the Lakes, in 1843 in Chapter 2: "Murray's travels I read, and was charmed by their accuracy and clear broad tone. He is the only Englishman that seems to have traversed these regions, as man, simply, not as John Bull."

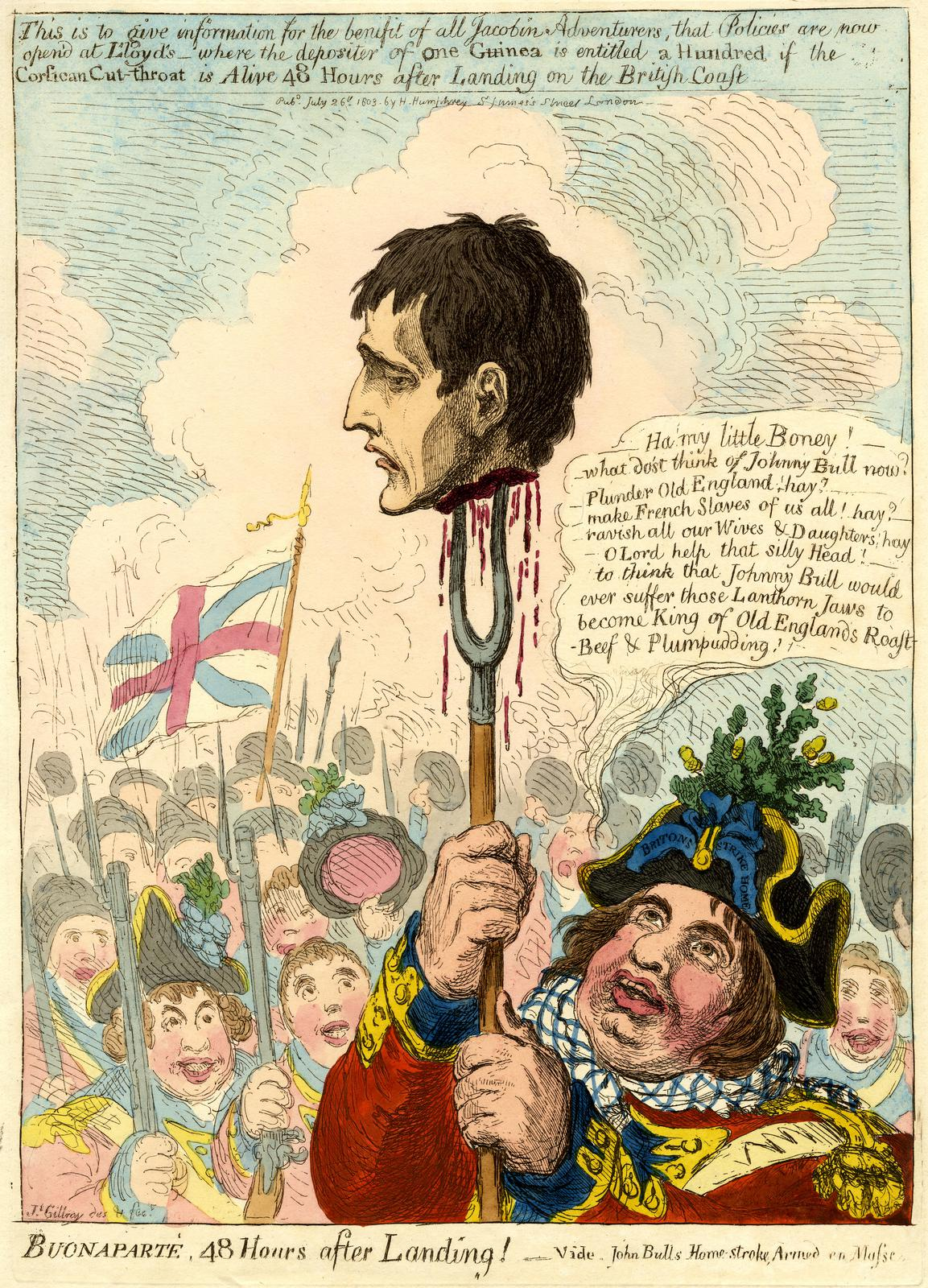
John Bull holds the head of Napoleon Bonaparte in an 1803 caricature by James Gillray.

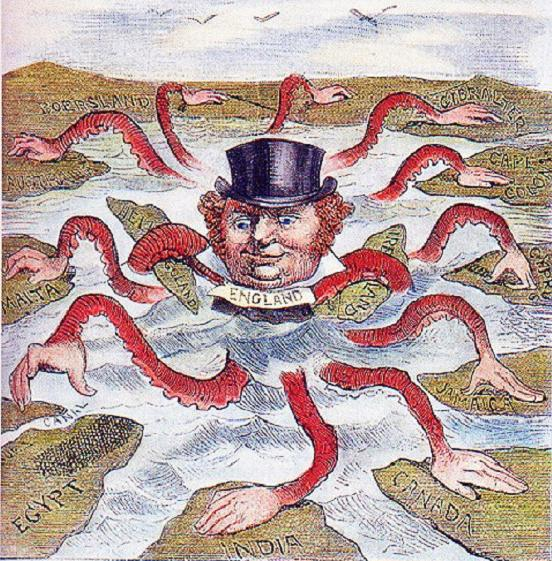
An 1882 American cartoon of John Bull as the "Imperial Octopus" with its arms in various regions.

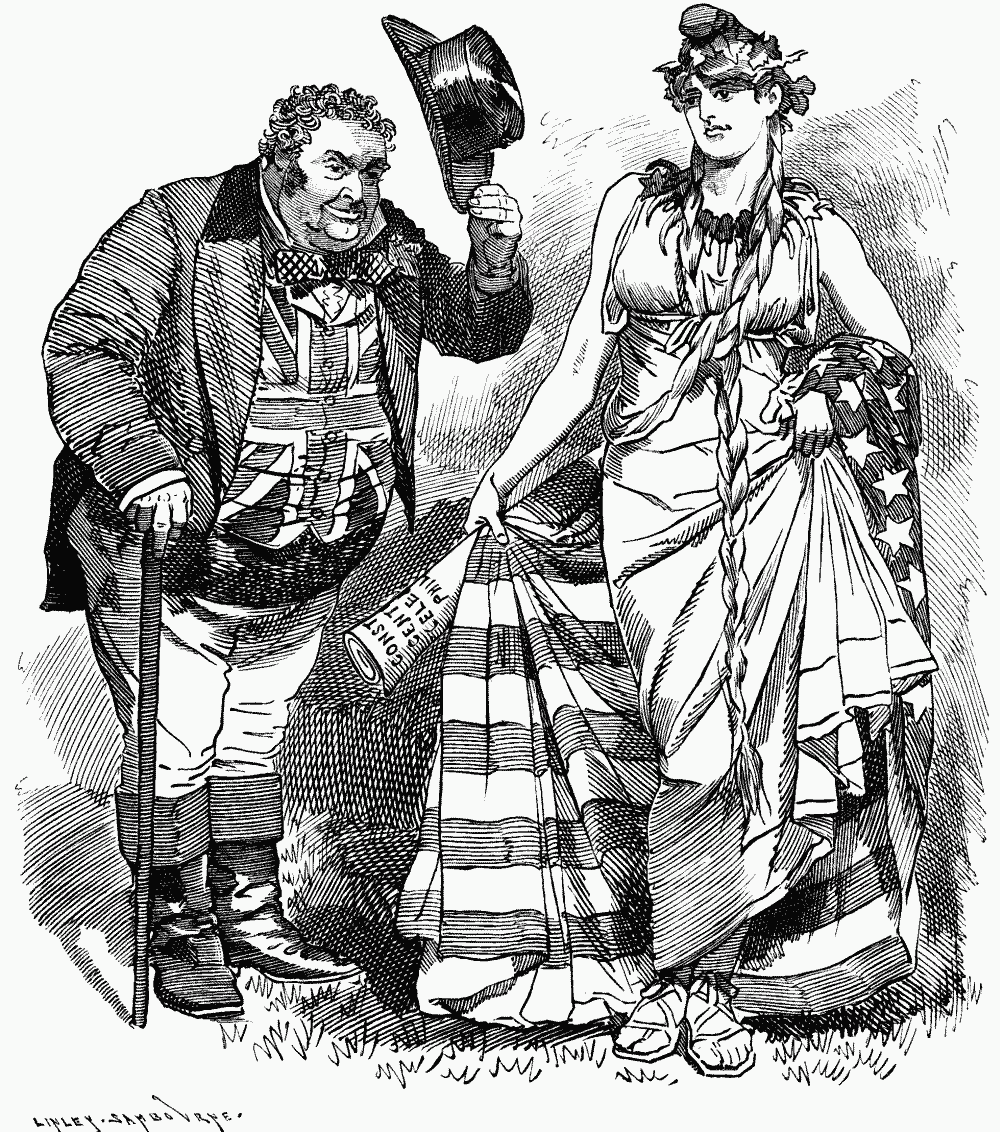
John Bull and Columbia in an 1887 Punch illustration

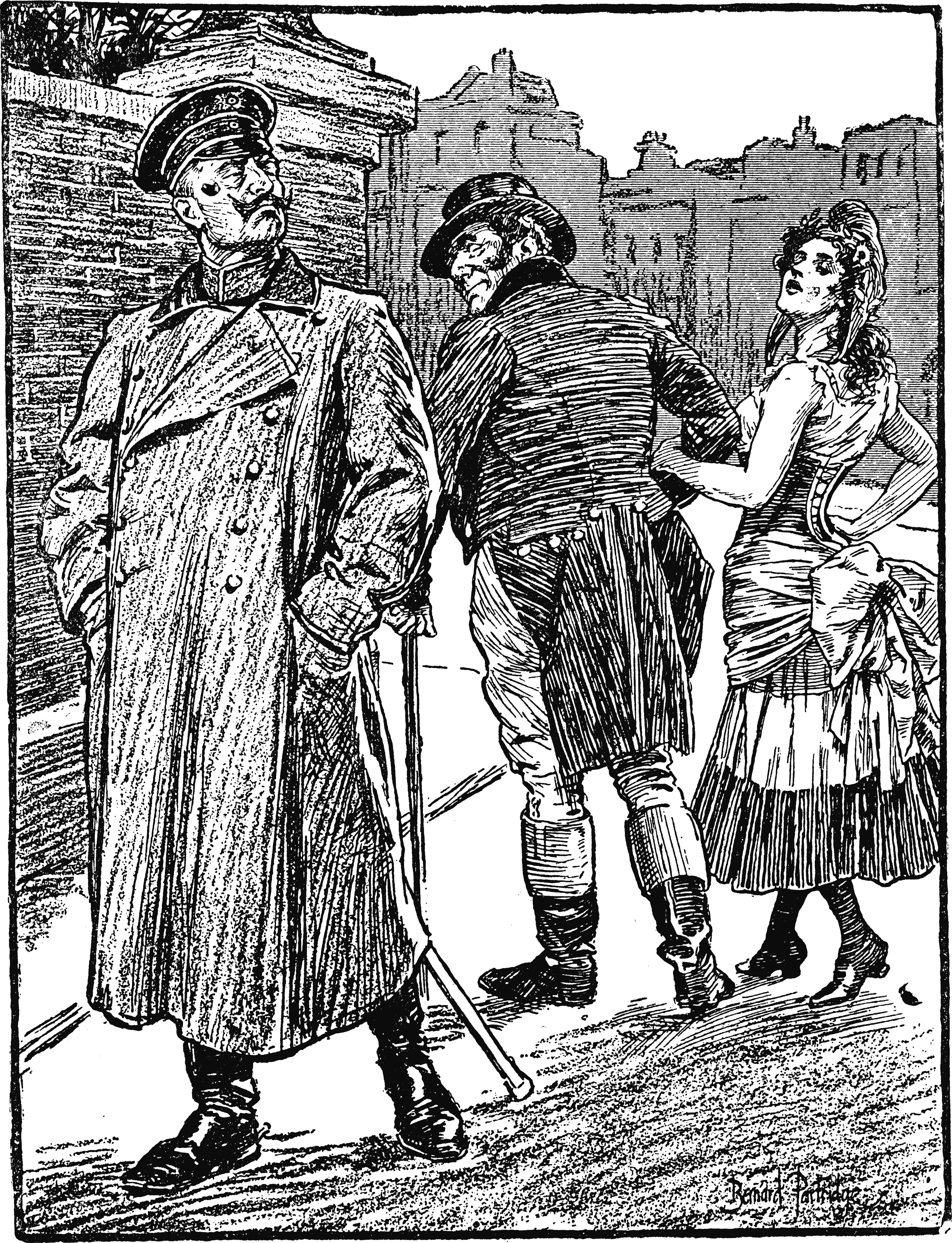
A 1904 British cartoon commenting on the Entente Cordiale: John Bull walking off with Marianne, turning his back on the Kaiser.

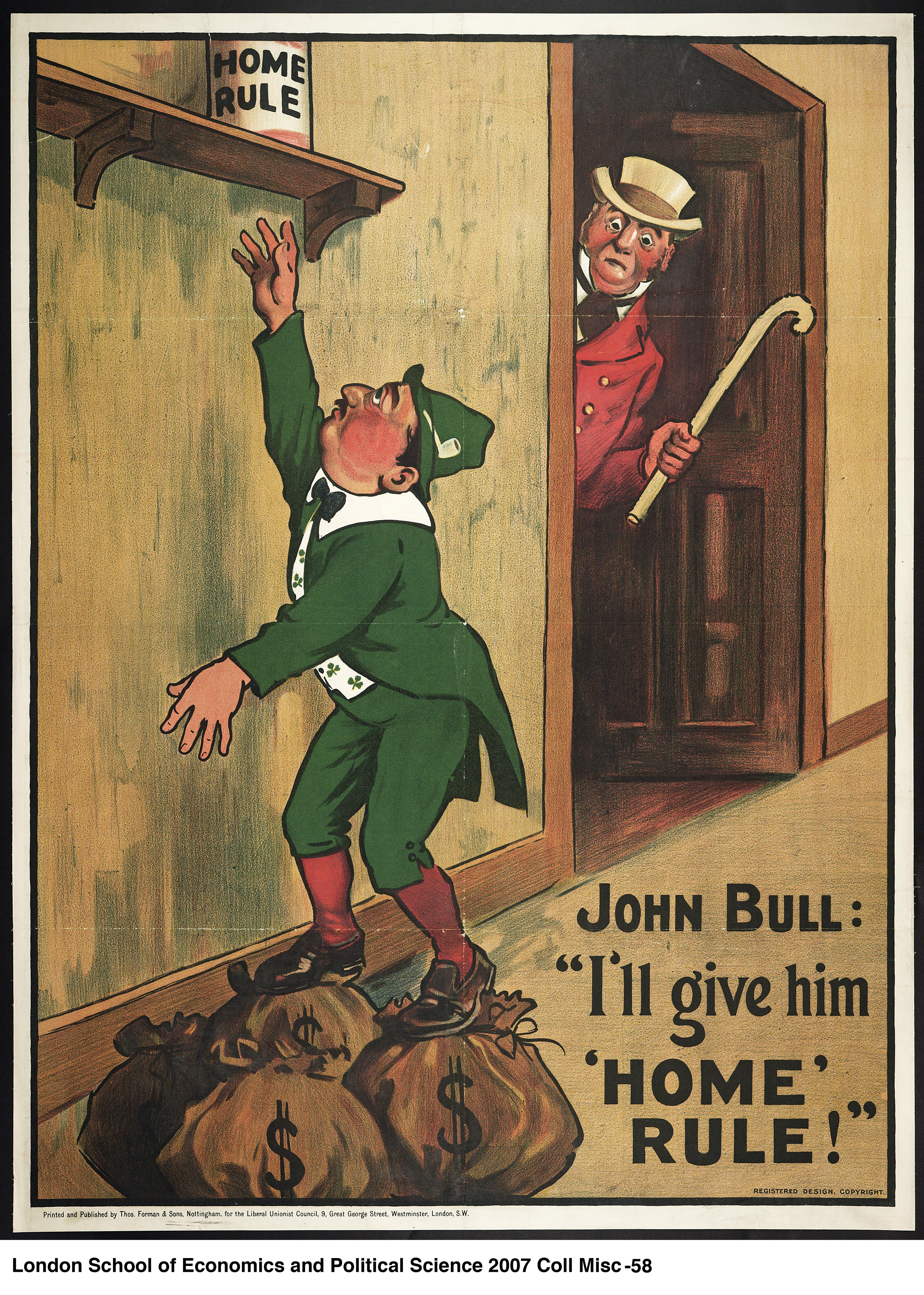
A 1905 lithograph featuring John Redmond, John Bull and Home Rule.

John Bull proclaiming his support for Conservative PM Arthur Balfour, 1905.

== See also ==
- Britannia, the female personification of Great Britain.
- Brother Jonathan
- John Bull's Other Island
- Johnny Canuck
- List of national symbols of the United Kingdom, the Channel Islands and the Isle of Man
- Marianne
- Sawney
- Terminology of the British Isles
- Uncle Sam
- William Ball, "the Shropshire Giant", a nineteenth-century giant who displayed himself in public as 'John Bull'.
