= Clawfinger discography =

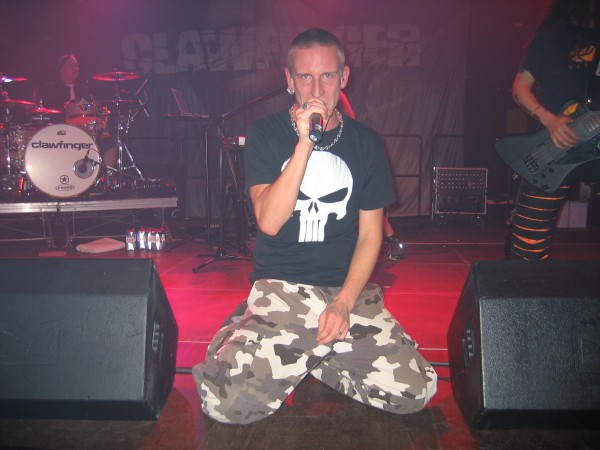
- Studio albums: 8
- Singles: 19
- Music videos: 19

The discography of Clawfinger, a Swedish/Norwegian rap metal band, consists of 8 studio albums, 19 singles and 19 videos.

== Albums ==
Studio albums

- Deaf Dumb Blind (1993)
- Use Your Brain (1995)
- Clawfinger (1997)
- A Whole Lot of Nothing (2001)
- Zeros & Heroes (2003)
- Hate Yourself with Style (2005)
- Life Will Kill You (2007)
- Before We All Die (2026)

Box sets

- Deafer Dumber Blinder (20 Years Anniversary Box 1993–2013) (2014)

== Singles ==
Year	Song	Peak chart positions					Album
Year	Song	NO	SE	UK	DE	AT	Album
1993	"Nigger"	4	22	—	—	—	Deaf Dumb Blind
1993	"The Truth"	—	—	125	—	—	Deaf Dumb Blind
1993	"Rosegrove"	—	—	—	—	—	Deaf Dumb Blind
1993	"Warfair"	—	12	54	—	—	Deaf Dumb Blind
1995	"Pin Me Down"	15	28	87	—	—	Use Your Brain
1995	"Tomorrow"	—	—	—	—	—	Use Your Brain
1995	"Do What I Say"	—	—	—	—	—	Use Your Brain
1997	"Biggest & The Best"	—	—	94	—	—	Clawfinger
1997	"Two Sides"	—	—	79	—	—	Clawfinger
1998	"Don't Wake Me Up"	—	—	—	—	—	Clawfinger
2001	"Out to Get Me"	—	—	—	68	74	A Whole Lot of Nothing
2001	"Nothing Going On"	—	—	—	—	—	A Whole Lot of Nothing
2003	"Recipe for Hate"	—	—	—	—	—	Zeros And Heroes
2003	"Bitch"	—	—	—	—	—	Zeros And Heroes
2005	"Dirty Lies"	—	—	—	—	—	Hate Yourself with Style
2006	"Without a Case"	—	—	—	—	—	Hate Yourself with Style
2007	"The Price We Pay"	—	—	—	—	—	Life Will Kill You
2007	"Little Baby"	—	—	—	—	—	Life Will Kill You
2017	"Save Our Souls"	—	—	—	—	—	single only
2019	"Tear You Down"	—	—	—	—	—	Before We All Die

"Nigger"

"Nigger" is the name of Clawfinger's first single. Despite its alarming title, the song has an anti-racist theme. The single was released with two different artworks.

The first music video was shot in 1992. It is black & white and shows grainy images of Clawfinger playing, intercut with the words "understand", "knowledge", "racism", "power" and various catchphrases questioning the use of the title word. The other Swedish version was shot in 1993. It was a more colorful video, which used many of the same live scenes as the first version, but the playing of the group is mixed with videos of military unrest and house fires.

"Do What I Say"

"Do What I Say" is Clawfinger's sixth single, the second from their album Use Your Brain (1995).

The music video was shot in 1995. It shows black-white video of house and a colorful boy, who walks into the house. The song is mixed with a child's voice singing "When I grow up, there will be a day when everybody has to do what I say", and shouting.

"Biggest & the Best"

"Biggest & the Best" is a single released by Clawfinger in 1997. The song appeared on the albums Clawfinger and Biggest and the Best Of. It is about the selfish acts of man, who equates himself to God, and considers himself the Almighty. The main idea of the song is an ironic attitude to people of such a type and its purpose is to criticise arrogance.

The video was shot in 1997. It shows vocalist Zak Tell preparing for the training in a gym locker room. He later appears in competitions with children in basketball, American football and boxing, and wins every one of them. He is sitting at the basketball hoop, and it shows him "biggest and the best, better than the rest". The other musicians are also playing at the basketball field. At the end of the video all three children bring in three very muscular men, presumably their fathers, and point to Zak as the video ends.

"Recipe for Hate"

"Recipe for Hate" is a single released by Clawfinger in 2003 in Germany. It is one of the few sung in a heavy metal style. It contains five songs (some of them are live versions), and also a video for "Recipe for Hate".

Tracklist

1. "Recipe for Hate" 3:01
2. "All My Greatest Fears" 4:14
3. "Get It Off My Chest" 3:42
4. "Biggest & the Best" (Live) 4:01
5. "Rosegrove" (Live) 3:46

The video was shot and released in 2003. The film shows the members of the band surrounded by a crowd of girls, playing in a dark room with blinking light and falling fluff. At the end of the first minute the vocalist Zak Tell starts singing face to face with one of the girls, after which she kicks him with a fist. Then some girls come to attack other members of the group but they continue playing until the end.

"Without a Case"

"Without a Case" is a song released by Clawfinger in 2006 as a single.

A music video was shot in 2005. At the beginning, the video shows a boy trying to escape from security but he is caught and then appears in a courtroom. The second figure is a girl, who is a victim of rape. She also appears in a court as a responsible party. When the judge tells a sentence, the plaintiffs begin to exult but the responsible parties aren't satisfied with the sentence. The boy treats the girl a bottle of water. After that, the girl falls unconscious. While the policeman come to her, the boy has a chance to run away.

== Music videos ==
- Nigger v1 (1992)
- Nigger v2 (1993)
- The Truth (1993)
- Warfair (1993)
- Pin Me Down (1995)
- Do What I Say (1995)
- Tomorrow (1996)
- Biggest & the Best (1997)
- Two Sides (1997)
- Out to Get Me (2001)
- Nothing Going On (2001)
- Recipe for Hate (2003)
- Recipe for Hate (2003) (edit by Jocke Skog)
- Grumpy Old Men on a Mission (2005) (web-released documentary on the making of Hate Yourself with Style)
- Dirty Lies (2005)
- Hate Yourself with Style (2005) (web-only video by Bård Torstensen)
- Without a Case (2005)
- The Price We Pay (2007)
- Prisoners (2007)
- Save Our Souls (2017)
