= Use of nigger in the arts =

This article treats the usage of the word nigger (now widely a racial slur) in reference to African Americans and others of African or mixed African and other ethnic origin in the art of Western culture and the English language.

== Literature ==
The use of nigger in older literature has become controversial because of the word's historical and modern meaning as a racist insult.

=== In the title ===
Our Nig: Sketches from the Life of a Free Black is an autobiographical novel by Harriet E. Wilson, a free Negro herself. It was published in 1859 and rediscovered in 1981 by literary scholar Henry Louis Gates Jr. It is believed to be the first novel published by an African-American woman on the North American continent.

In 1898, Joseph Conrad penned a novella titled The Nigger of the 'Narcissus', whose titular character, James Wait, is a West Indian black sailor on board the merchant ship Narcissus sailing from Bombay to London. In the United States, the novel was first published with the title The Children of the Sea: A Tale of the Forecastle, at the insistence by the publisher, Dodd, Mead and Company, that no one would buy or read a book with the word "nigger" in its title, not because the word was deemed offensive but that a book about a black man would not sell.

The writer and photographer Carl Van Vechten took the opposite view to Conrad's publishers when he advised the British novelist Ronald Firbank to change the title of his 1924 novel Sorrow in Sunlight to Prancing Nigger for the American market, and it became very successful there under that title. Van Vechten, a white supporter of the Harlem Renaissance (1920s–30s), then used the word himself in his 1926 novel Nigger Heaven, which provoked controversy in the black community. Of the controversy, Langston Hughes wrote:

No book could possibly be as bad as Nigger Heaven has been painted. And no book has ever been better advertised by those who wished to damn it. Because it was declared obscene, everybody wanted to read it, and I'll venture to say that more Negroes bought it than ever purchased a book by a Negro author. Then, as now, the use of the word nigger by a white was a flashpoint for debates about the relationship between black culture and its white patrons.

Ten Little Niggers was the original title of Agatha Christie's 1939 detective novel in the UK edition, named for a children's counting-out game familiar in England at that date. The U.S. edition, however, was titled And Then There Were None, using "Injuns" instead of "niggers" in the counting-out rhyme. Since the 1980s, the title has been changed to And Then There Were None for all English editions, and the rhyme has been changed to "Ten little soldier boys". The novel retains its original title in some other languages. For example, a current Mexican edition is entitled Diez negritos (English: Ten Little Negroes).

Flannery O'Connor uses a black lawn jockey as a symbol in her 1955 short story "The Artificial Nigger". American comedian Dick Gregory used the word in the title of his 1964 autobiography, written during the American Civil Rights Movement. Gregory comments on his choice of title in the book's primary dedication: "if ever you hear the word "nigger" again, remember they are advertising my book. Gil Scott-Heron, the American jazz poet who wrote "The Revolution Will Not Be Televised", released a novel in 1972 entitled '''The Nigger Factory", described as "life on black college campuses". Labi Siffre, the singer-songwriter best known for "(Something Inside) So Strong", entitled his first book of poetry simply Nigger (Xavier Books 1993).

=== Huckleberry Finn ===
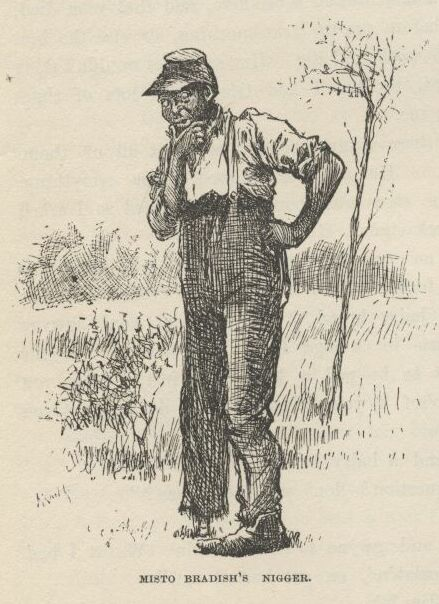
1885 illustration from Mark Twain's Adventures of Huckleberry Finn, captioned "Misto Bradish's nigger"

Mark Twain's novel Adventures of Huckleberry Finn (1885) has long been the subject of controversy for its racial content. Huckleberry Finn was the fifth most challenged book during the 1990s, according to the American Library Association. The novel is written from the point of view, and largely in the language, of Huckleberry Finn, an uneducated white boy, who is drifting down the Mississippi River on a raft with an adult escaped slave, Jim. The word "nigger" is used (mostly about Jim) over 200 times. Twain's advocates note that the novel is composed in then-contemporary vernacular usage, not racist stereotype, because Jim, the black man, is a sympathetic character.

In 2011, a new edition published by NewSouth Books replaced the word "nigger" with "slave" and also removed the word "injun". The change was spearheaded by Twain scholar Alan Gribben in the hope of "countering the 'pre-emptive censorship'" that results from the book's being removed from school curricula over language concerns. The changes sparked outrage from critics Elon James, Alexandra Petrie and Chris Meadows.

=== British literary usage ===
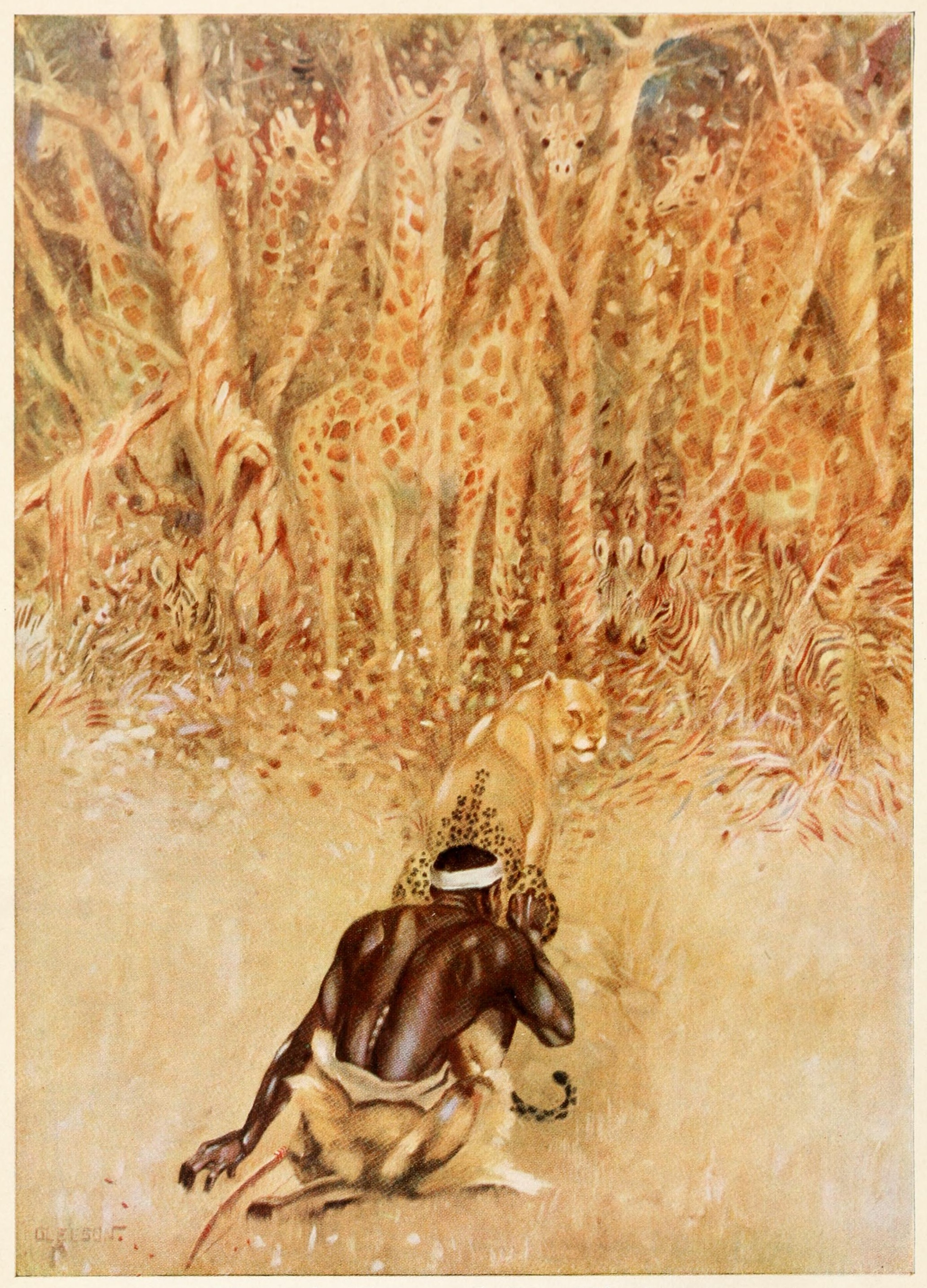
"How the Leopard Got His Spots"

Several late-nineteenth- and early-twentieth-century British literary usages suggest neutral usage. The popular Victorian era entertainment, the Gilbert and Sullivan operetta The Mikado (1885), twice uses the word nigger. In the song As some day it may happen, the executioner, Ko-ko, sings of executing the "nigger serenader and the others of his race", referring to white singers with their faces blacked singing minstrel songs. In the song A more humane Mikado, the Mikado sings of the punishment for older women who dye their hair or wear corsets, to be "Blacked like a nigger/With permanent walnut juice." Both lyrics are usually changed for modern performances.

The word "nigger" appears in children's literature. "How the Leopard Got His Spots", in the Just So Stories (1902) by Rudyard Kipling, tells of an Ethiopian man and a leopard, both originally sand-colored, deciding to camouflage themselves with painted spots, for hunting in tropical forest. The story originally included a scene wherein the leopard (now spotted) asks the Ethiopian man why he does not want spots. In contemporary editions of "How the Leopard Got His Spots", the Ethiopian's original reply ("Oh, plain black's best for a nigger") has been edited to, "Oh, plain black's best for me." The counting rhyme known as "Eenie Meenie Mainee, Mo" has been attested from 1820, with many variants; when Kipling included it as "A Counting-Out Song" in Land and Sea Tales for Scouts and Guides (1923), he gave as its second line, "Catch a nigger by the toe!" This version became widely used for much of the twentieth century; the rhyme is still in use, but the second line now uses "tiger" instead.

The word "nigger" is used by the child characters in some of the Swallows and Amazons series, written in the 1930s by Arthur Ransome, e.g. in referring to how the (white) characters appear in photographic negatives ("Look like niggers to me") in The Big Six. The term is used by Pete, one of the "Death and Glories" who are working-class sons of boatbuilders: the other children are middle-class children of professionals. It was also a synonym for black pearls in Peter Duck. Editions published by Puffin after Ransome's death changed the word to 'negroes'.

In The General, C. S. Forester's 1936 novel about a First World War British general, the general says approvingly of his patron he "works like a nigger and plenty of brains".

The first Jeeves novel, Thank You, Jeeves (1934), features a minstrel show as a significant plot point. Bertie Wooster, who is trying to learn to play the banjo, is in admiration of their artistry and music. P. G. Wodehouse has the repeated phrase "nigger minstrels" only on the lips of Wooster and his peers; the manservant Jeeves uses the more genteel "Negroes".

In short story "The Basement Room" (1935), by Graham Greene, the (sympathetic) servant character, Baines, tells the admiring boy, son of his employer, of his African British colony service, "You wouldn't believe it now, but I've had forty niggers under me, doing what I told them to". Replying to the boy's question: "Did you ever shoot a nigger?" Bains answers: "I never had any call to shoot. Of course I carried a gun. But you didn't need to treat them bad, that just made them stupid. Why, I loved some of those dammed niggers." The cinematic version, The Fallen Idol (1948), directed by Carol Reed, replaced this usage with "natives".

In Paul Temple (1940) [Track 15] by Francis Durbridge the phrase "he worked like a nigger" is used without any apparent further context.

Virginia Woolf, in her 1941 posthumously published novel Between the Acts, wrote "Down amongst the bushes she worked like a nigger." The phrase is not dialogue from one of the characters, nor is it in the context of expressing a point of view of one of the characters. Woolf's usage of racist slurs has been examined in various academic writings.

The Reverend W. V. Awdry's The Railway Series (1945–72) story Henry's Sneeze, originally described soot-covered boys with the phrase "as black as niggers". However in 1972, after complaints, the description was later changed to "as black as soot", in the subsequent editions. The best-known character in the series is Thomas the Tank Engine (1946).

== Culinary and confectionary arts ==
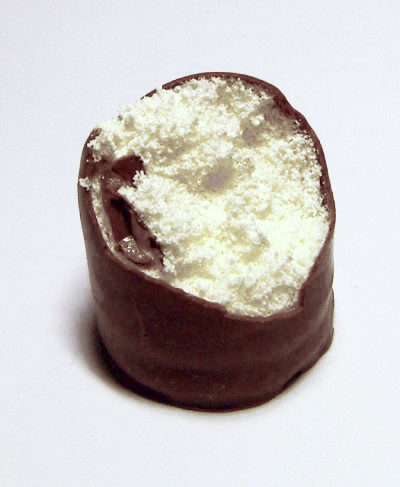
Negro Kisses (Neekerin Suukkoja in Finnish)

Brunberg Kisses, a popular marshmallow-filled chocolate candy from Finland, were called Negro Kisses or Nigger Kisses (neekerin suukkoja in Finnish) from 1951 to 2001, later changed to Brunberg's Kisses

== Music ==
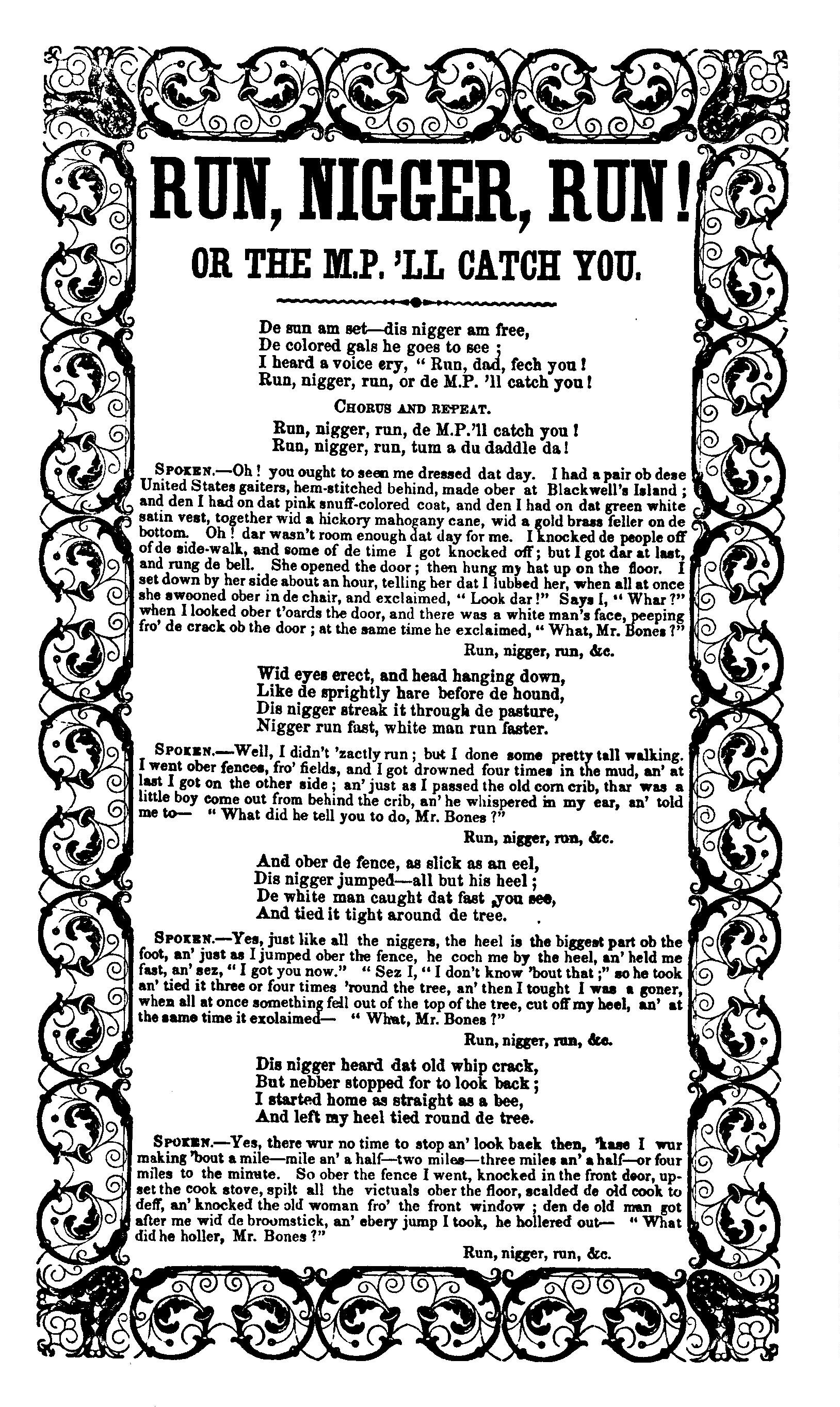
1851 song lyrics

The 19th-century minstrel song "Oh! Susanna" by Stephen Foster had originally been written in four verses. The second verse describes an industrial accident which "kill'd five hundred Nigger" by electrocution.

The Bohemian composer Antonín Dvořák wrote the String Quartet No. 12 in 1893 during his time in the United States. For its presumed association with African-American music, the quartet was referred to until the 1950s with nicknames such as "Negro Quartet" and "Nigger Quartet" before being called the "American Quartet".

The 1932 British song "The Sun Has Got His Hat On" originally included the line "He's been tanning niggers out in Timbuktu" (where "He" is the sun). Modern recordings substitute other lines.

The term white nigger is also used in music, including in Elvis Costello's 1979 song "Oliver's Army".

=== 1960s ===
The South African song "Ag Pleez Deddy" by Jeremy Taylor, released in 1962, includes in its chorus a mention of "Nigger balls", a type of gobstopper, as one of a series of consumer products coveted by the young white South Africans who are the song's focus. The song was banned by the South African Broadcasting Corporation, but this was because its mixing of English and Afrikaans language was considered to violate the principles of apartheid. In the longer term, the mention of "Nigger balls" became more controversial: when Oxford University Press's A New Book of South African Verse in English was published in 1979, the term "acid-drops" was substituted; and when later singing the song in the United States, Taylor substituted "sugar balls".

In the 1960s, record producer J. D. "Jay" Miller published pro-racial segregation music, with the "Reb Rebel" label featuring racist songs by Johnny Rebel and others, demeaning black Americans and the Civil Rights Movement. The country music artist David Allan Coe used the racial terms "redneck", "white trash", and "nigger" in the songs "If That Ain't Country, I'll Kiss Your Ass" and "Nigger Fucker".

Just before their breakout at The Woodstock music festival in 1969, Sly and the Family Stone released their hit album Stand! which contained the song "Don't Call Me Nigger, Whitey".

=== 1970s ===
In 1970, the American band The Last Poets released their debut album of the same name. It features three tracks using the word in their titles: "Run, Nigger", "Wake Up, Niggers", and "Niggers Are Scared of Revolution". The British performance poet Malik Al Nasir claims that his mentor Gil Scott-Heron was inspired to write the classic song "The Revolution Will Not Be Televised" by the last of these three.

In 1972, John Lennon and Yoko Ono used the word in both the title and in the chorus of their song "Woman Is the Nigger of the World", which was released as both a single and a track on their album Sometime in New York City.

Mick Jagger used the word in The Rolling Stones' song "Sweet Black Angel" from the 1972 album Exile on Main St.

In Bob Marley and the Wailers' 1973 song "Get Up, Stand Up", Marley can be heard singing the line "don't be a nigger in your neighborhood" during the outro.

Stevie Wonder used the word in the album version (but not the single version) of his 1973 song "Living for the City". The word is not sung but used as dialogue during the song's non-musical musical bridge.

Freddie Mercury used the word in Queen's song "The March of the Black Queen" from the 1974 album Queen II.

In 1975, Betty Davis used the word in her song "F.U.N.K."; Bob Dylan used the word in his song "Hurricane".

In 1978, Patti Smith used the word prominently in her song "Rock N Roll Nigger".

In 1979, Elvis Costello used the phrase "white nigger" to refer to Northern Irish people forced to become mercenaries in the song "Oliver's Army".

=== 1980s and 1990s ===
The punk band the Dead Kennedys used the word in their 1980 song "Holiday in Cambodia" in the line, "Bragging that you know how the niggers feel cold and the slum's got so much soul". The context is a section mocking champagne socialists. Rap groups such as N.W.A (Niggaz with Attitudes) re-popularized the usage in their songs. One of the earliest uses of the word in hip hop was in the song "New York New York" by Grandmaster Flash and the Furious Five in 1983. Responding to accusations of racism after referring to "niggers" in the lyrics of the 1988 Guns N' Roses song, "One in a Million", Axl Rose stated: "I was pissed off about some black people that were trying to rob me. I wanted to insult those particular black people. I didn't want to support racism."

In 1980, The BusBoys used the word in their song "KKK" from their album Minimum Wage Rock & Roll.

Also In 1980, the punk band X used the word in their song Los Angeles.

In 1981, Frank Zappa used the word in his song "You Are What You Is" in his album under the same name.

In 1982, Dave Dictor of the Hardcore Punk band MDC used the word in their song "Dead Cops / America's So Straight".

In 1987, the thrash metal band M.O.D. used the word in their song "Aren't You Hungry?", off their first album U.S.A. for M.O.D..

In 1992, the Swedish crossover band Clawfinger had a hit single with the title "Nigger". The lyrics criticized the self-derogatory nature of that word's usage by black people. The controversial song also appeared on their first album Deaf Dumb Blind, in 1993 and on their demo from 1990.

The 1993 song from A Tribe Called Quest "Sucka Nigga" off their album Midnight Marauders addresses the rising usage of the word in Hip Hop at the time.

While not directly used in the lyrics, the American metal band Eyehategod released a song titled "White Nigger" in 1993.

The 1995 song "They Breed" by American death metal band Malevolent Creation from their album Eternal concludes with the word.

The 1995 song "I Believe" by Blessid Union of Souls featured a line containing the word but was edited for radio airplay.

=== 21st century ===
Since the 2010s the word nigger has been used with increasing frequency by African Americans amongst themselves or in self-expression and has become the most common swear word in hip hop music lyrics. As a result, it is a word that is heard daily by millions of all races worldwide who listen to uncensored hip hop and other music genres, while being socially unacceptable for anyone but African Americans to utter. Ta-Nehisi Coates has suggested that it continues to be unacceptable for people who are not of African ancestry to utter the word nigger while singing or rapping along to hip-hop, and that by being so restrained it gives White Americans (specifically) a taste of what it is like to not be entitled to "do anything they please, anywhere". Counterpoint to this standpoint is the open question of whether daily, frequent exposure by non-Black Americans to African Americans using the word will inevitably lead to a dilution of the extremely negative perception of the word among the majority of non-Black Americans that currently consider its use unacceptable and shocking.

American death metal band Arghoslent used the word in their song "Quelling The Simian Surge", off their 2002 album Incorrigible Bigotry.

Sardonic grindcore band Anal Cunt released a song titled "Beating Up Niggers that Sell Fake Crack", which also contains references to the word "nigger" in the lyrics. The song appeared part of the band's final album Wearing Out Our Welcome, released shortly after the death of the band's frontman Seth Putnam.

== Theater ==
The musical Show Boat, which subverts anti-miscegenation laws, from 1927 until 1946 features the word "nigger" as originally integral to the lyrics of "Ol' Man River" and "Cotton Blossom"; although deleted from the cinema versions, it is included in the 1988 EMI recording of the original score. Musical theatre historian Miles Kreuger and conductor John McGlinn propose that the word was not an insult, but a blunt illustration of how white people then perceived black people.

Bernardine Evaristo used the word as the title her first play as a student, which the then head of Rose Bruford College said "was the best piece of theatre he'd ever seen". She went on to found the Theatre of Black Women and in 2021 became president of her alma mater. Evaristo recalled her student production on Desert Island Discs decades later:

It was really short and it was basically an explosion of rage. It was called the N word. And I jumped onto the stage and I shouted that word out really loudly. And then I say something like 'Too black, not black enough, too white, not white enough' and then some other things and then jump off the stage. So it was really short. And it was probably very powerful. He probably hadn't seen anything like it before. It really was a very vicious word then. And I was basically saying, this is how I'm seen. This is what I might be called. But where do I stand because I'm a mixed race person. Not a very sophisticated piece of theatre, but punchy.

The Moore's Ford lynchings, also known as the 1946 Georgia lynching, has been commemorated since 2005 with a yearly re-enactment. According to a volunteer actor playing one of the victims, this living memorial "consist[s] largely of older white men calling him "nigger," tying a noose around his neck, and pretending to shoot him repeatedly"

== Cinema ==
One of Horace Ové's first films was Baldwin's Nigger (1968), in which two African Americans, novelist James Baldwin and comedian Dick Gregory, discuss Black experience and identity in Britain and the United States. Filmed at the West Indian Students' Centre in London, the film documents a lecture by Baldwin and a question-and-answer session with the audience.

Mel Brooks' 1974 satirical Western film Blazing Saddles used the term repeatedly. In The Kentucky Fried Movie (1977), the sequence titled "Danger Seekers" features a stuntman performing the dangerous act of shouting "Niggers!" at a group of black people, then fleeing when they take chase.

Stanley Kubrick's critically acclaimed 1987 war film Full Metal Jacket depicts black and white U.S. Marines enduring boot camp and later fighting together in Vietnam. "Nigger" is used by soldiers of both races in jokes and as expressions of bravado ("put a nigger behind the trigger", says the Black Corporal "Eightball"), with racial differences among the men seen as secondary to their shared exposure to the dangers of combat: white Gunnery Sergeant Hartman says, "There is no racial bigotry here. I do not look down on niggers, kikes, wops or greasers. Here you are all equally worthless."

Gayniggers from Outer Space, a 1992 English-language Danish short blaxploitation parody, features black homosexual male aliens who commit gendercide to free the men of Earth from female oppression. Die Hard with a Vengeance (1995) featured a scene where villain Simon Gruber requires New York City Police Department Lt. John McClane to wear a sandwich board reading "I hate niggers" while standing on a street corner in predominantly-black Harlem, resulting in McClane meeting Zeus Carver, as Carver rescues McClane from being attacked by neighborhood toughs.

American filmmaker Quentin Tarantino has been criticized for the heavy usage of the word nigger in his films, especially Jackie Brown (1997), where the word is used 38 times; Django Unchained (2012), 110 times; and in The Hateful Eight (2015), 65 times.

=== The Dam Busters ===
During World War II, a dog named Nigger, a black Labrador Retriever, belonged to Royal Air Force Wing Commander Guy Gibson. In 1943, Gibson led the successful Operation Chastise attack on dams in Nazi Germany. The dog's name was used as a single codeword whose transmission conveyed that the Möhne dam had been breached. In Michael Anderson's 1955 film The Dam Busters, based on the raid, the dog was portrayed in several scenes; his name and the codeword were mentioned several times. Some scenes were sampled in Alan Parker's 1982 film Pink Floyd – The Wall.

In 1999, British television network ITV broadcast a censored version with each of the twelve utterances of nigger deleted. Replying to complaints, ITV blamed regional broadcaster London Weekend Television, which, in turn, singled out a junior employee as the unauthorised censor. In June 2001, when ITV re-broadcast the censored version of The Dam Busters, Index on Censorship criticised it as "unnecessary and ridiculous" censorship breaking the continuity of the film and the story. In January 2012, the film was shown uncensored on ITV4, but with a warning at the start that the film contained racial terms from the historical period which some people could find offensive. Versions edited for US television have the dog's name altered to "Trigger".

In 2008, New Zealand filmmaker Peter Jackson announced his intention to spearhead a remake. Screenwriter Stephen Fry said there was "no question in America that you could ever have a dog called the N-word". In the unrealized remake, the dog was to be renamed "Digger".

== Television ==
Nigger was commonly used on American television prior to the cultural shift toward political correctness in the 1990s. Popular 1970s Black American TV shows like Sanford and Son and The Jeffersons used nigger outright, "before political correctness" according to Loretta Divine one of the stars of The Carmichael Show.

In a notorious early sketch called "Word Association" during Saturday Night Live's first season in 1975, an interviewer (Chevy Chase) asks the applicant, Mr. Wilson (Pryor), to take a word association test. Partway through the test, the interviewer begins using increasingly offensive anti-black racial slurs, to which Wilson reacts with anti-white slurs (including "honky"). Finally, the interviewer says nigger, to which Wilson replies, "Dead honky". Paul Mooney said he wrote the sketch based on his own experience being interviewed by network executives.

In the 1998 Star Trek: Deep Space Nine episode "Far Beyond the Stars", Captain Benjamin Sisko experiences an episode-long vision that he is really a black science fiction magazine writer in 1950s New York City named Benny Russell. At a coffee shop in Harlem where his fiance is a waitress, Russell gets into a discussion with local hustler Jimmy (played by Cirroc Lofton, who normally plays Ben's son Jake Sisko). Jimmy criticizes the usefulness of Russell writing stories about "men on the Moon" in the future, because it will only be white men that go to outer space. Russell insists that in the future, black people will explore other planets as the equals of whites. Jimmy responds by scoffing that whites will never let blacks go to the Moon with them except to "shine their shoes" there, and that "today or a hundred years from now don't make a bit of difference – as far as they're concerned, we'll always be 'niggers'..." This was the first time that the word was ever used in Star Trek, though it was used in the period context of a character describing racial discrimination.

During the early 2000s, comedian Dave Chappelle heavily appropriated nigger throughout the two popular seasons of Comedy Central's Chappelle's Show, including a sketch featuring "Clayton Bigsby", the fictional black white-supremacist author of Nigger Stain and I Smell Nigger — deemed "best Chappelle Show sketch ever" by Rembert Brown. Nigger was most generously used on a sketch about a Norman-Rockwell-esque suburban white family called The Niggars.

Later in the 2000s, South Park's eleventh season premiered with "With Apologies to Jesse Jackson", in which Randy Marsh incorrectly answers niggers instead of naggers for the hint "people who annoy you" on Wheel of Fortune, which triggers public humiliation and ostracism. Despite criticism from the Parents Television Council, many, including African Americans, have praised the episode for its humorous message of how it feels to be called a nigger.

In Generation Kill, a 2008 nonfiction HBO Miniseries covering Recon Marines during the 2003 invasion of Iraq, Marines routinely prepare "November Juliette" for morning coffee. In episode 5 a puzzled reporter is told what November Juliette (NJ) means: "Nigger Juice".

In The Walking Dead, a 2010 TV series based on the comic series of the same name, several characters utilize the slur in the season one episode "Guts". This is done to show the white supremacist views of the character Merle Dixon, played by Michael Rooker, and to show the counterview of Rick Grimes, played by Andrew Lincoln, who believes that race and discrimination should not matter anymore in a world ravaged by the undead. This was met with mixed reception, with Eric Goldman of IGN criticizing this introduction of Merle as ridiculous.

== Stand-up comedy ==
Some stand-up comedians have broached the subject. This was done in 1996 by Chris Rock in his "Niggas vs. Black People" routine. Richard Pryor used the word extensively before pledging to remove it from his lexicon, having had a change of heart during a trip to Africa. Comedian Dick Gregory titled his 1964 memoir "Nigger: An Autobiography by Dick Gregory".

Michael Richards, famous for playing Kramer on the TV sitcom Seinfeld, was recorded shouting "He's a nigger!" several times at the Laugh Factory during a standup comedy performance in 2006. A Gallup poll found that 45 percent of non-whites expressed a negative view of Richards due to the incident.
