= Whitey (slang) =

Ethnic slur for a white person

"Whitey" is a derogatory term for a white person. The level of contempt implied by the term varies, although it is most often used as an insult.

In Saturday Night Live's notorious 1975 "Racist Word Association Interview" skit, Richard Pryor's character uses "whitey/cracker" as his response to Chevy Chase's character's prompt of "negro".

During Barack Obama's 2008 US presidential campaign, a hoax was promoted that his wife Michelle Obama had been recorded "railing against 'whitey'", which she denied, saying, "That’s something that George Jefferson would say."

== See also ==
- "Don't Call Me Nigger, Whitey" – track on 1969 studio album by Sly and the Family Stone
- "Whitey on the Moon" – 1970 spoken word poem by Gil Scott-Heron
- Honky
- White nigger
- White trash
- Wigger
