= Bård Torstensen =

Norwegian guitarist

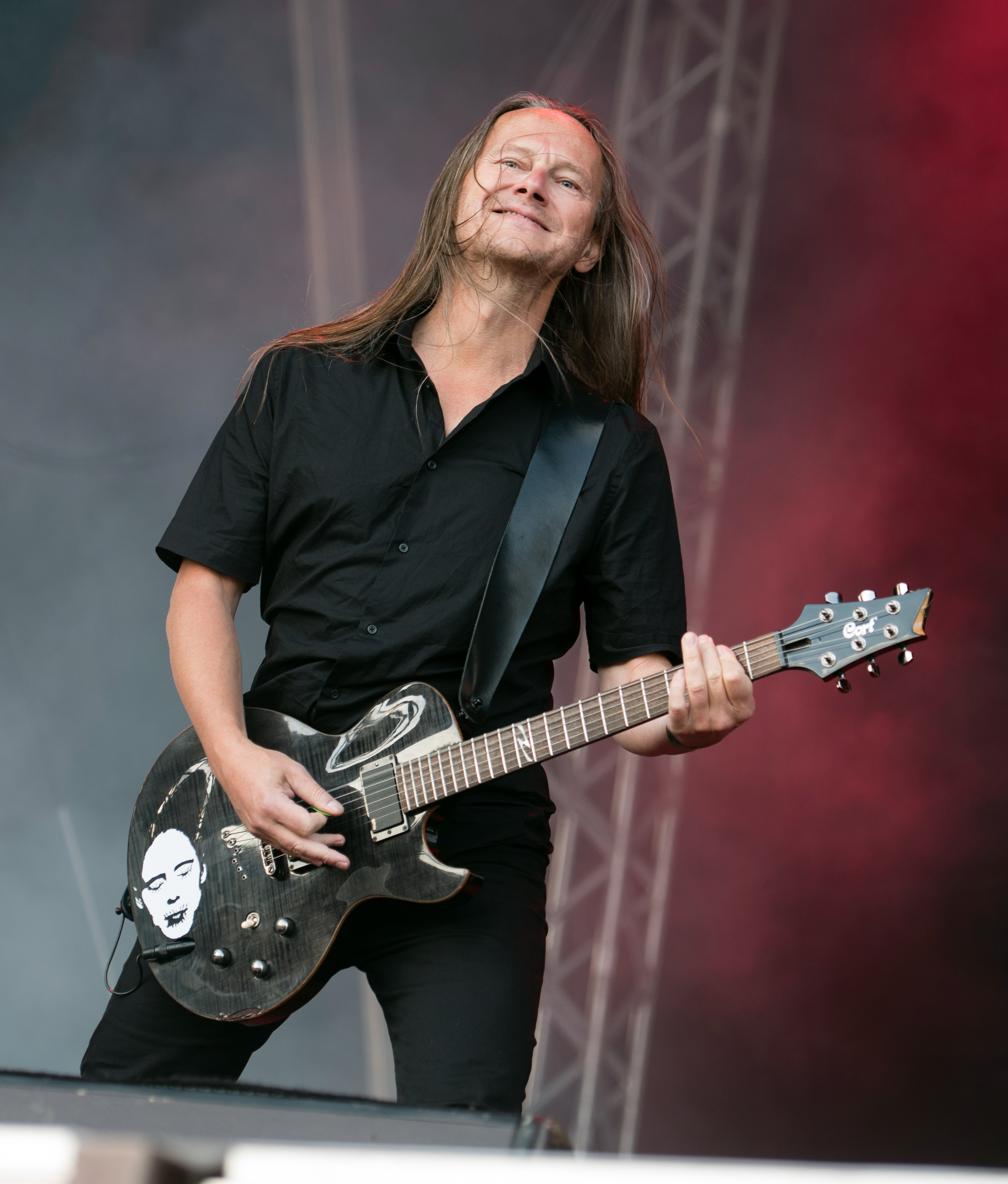
- Torstensen with Clawfinger in 2019

Background information
- Born: 13 September 1961 (age 64); Arendal, Norway
- Genres: Rap metal, country, jazz
- Occupations: Musician, producer
- Instrument: Guitar
- Years active: 1982–present
- Website: clawfinger.net

Bård Torstensen (born 13 September 1961) is a Norwegian guitarist and record producer, best known as a founder and longtime member of the rap metal band Clawfinger.

Torstensen also plays guitar in the ice skate-country band Melkesyra and the jazz/metal band Okavango, both of which are from his home town. Before founding Clawfinger in 1990 with Zak Tell (lead vocals), Jocke Skog (keyboards) and Erlend Ottem (guitar), he and Ottem played in a local band named Theo. This band made only one single and one LP, The Good, the Bad, and the Ugly (1988).

Torstensen is a known activist in his home town Arendal, and is engaged in preserving his community Barbu by working to stop new building plans.

== Equipment and gear ==
During his time in Clawfinger, he can mostly be seen playing various Gibson Les Pauls, most mostly relied on Gibson Les Paul Studios. He could also be seen playing Les Paul Customs and Standards, as well as an Epiphone Les Paul Standard Baritone which was used for songs that required Drop A tuning. He could also be seen using guitars from other brands, such as a Schecter Celloblaster C5-X Baritone and an Ibanez Xiphos 7-string, both of which were also use in drop A tuning, although the Schecter was sometimes tuned to an alternate tuning where the lowest 3 strings are tuned to G in 2 octaves, and the remaining strings were tuned to D, and G above an octave (G-G-G-D-G). This tuning can be heard on songs like "Nothing Going On".

For amplification, the band claims to have never relied on traditional amplifiers; solely on pre-amps, speaker cabinet emulation, multi-effect processors, and amp modeling. During the 1990s and early 2000s, Torstensen mostly relied SansAmp preamps, starting with the original pedal Sansamp in the early-mid 1990s. A Boss ME-5 processor was used along with it. During the late-1990s and early 2000s, he relied on a small rack unit that contained a Tech21 SansAmp PSA-1 analog pre-amp, Digitech 2112 multi-effects processor for speaker emulations, and a wireless unit. From 2001 to 2004, he began using a Boss GX700 pre-amp and multi-FX processor that ran into the Digitech or a Matchbox MB10 for speaker simulations. Sometime after the release of Zeroes and Heroes, he switched to using Line6 processors, relying on the PODxt series. This change is apparent in the band's next album Hate Yourself With Style, due to the guitars sounding less "processed" and more "metallic". In the studio, the POD would be run into a PA system power amp which fed into a Line6 4x12, which would be picked up via microphone. Live, the POD would run straight into the venue's PA system. Sometime during 2009, the band began using Fractal Axe-FX processors, which he would use until the end of the band.

== Discography (as guitarist) ==
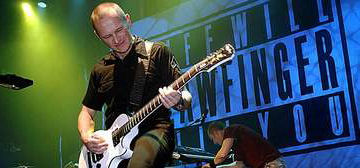
Torstensen in 2007

- Theo – The Good, the Bad, and the Ugly (1988)
- Tone Norum – Don't Turn Around(1992)
- Clawfinger – Deaf Dumb Blind (1993)
- Clawfinger – Use Your Brain (1995)
- Clawfinger – Clawfinger (1997)
- Clawfinger – A Whole Lot of Nothing (2001)
- Clawfinger – Zeros & Heroes (2003)
- Clawfinger – Hate Yourself With Style (2005)
- Melkesyra – Hurtigløpskøntri (2006)
- Clawfinger – Life Will Kill You (2007)
- Melkesyra – Melkesyra går allround (2009)
- Okavango – Phonogene (2011)
- Neonato – The End of Music (2015)
- Melkesyra – Rett fram og til venstre (2018)
- Grown – For Life (2021)
