= The Price We Pay =

The Price We Pay may refer to:

- The Price We Pay, a 1995 book by Laura Lederer
- The Price We Pay, a 2007 song by Clawfinger from their album Life Will Kill You
- The Price We Pay (2014 film), a 2014 Canadian documentary film
- The Price We Pay (2022 film), a 2022 American horror film
