= The Saga of White Will =

White supremacist comic book

- Cover of the comic
- Author: William Luther Pierce
- Illustrator: Daniel "Rip" Roush (drawings and lettering); William White Williams (coloring)
- Language: English
- Publisher: National Vanguard Books
- Publication date: 1993
- Publication place: United States
- Media type: Comic book
- Pages: 37
- ISBN: 978-1-73711-690-5 (2nd edition)
- OCLC: 875575785

New World Order Comix #1: The Saga of... White Will!! is a white supremacist comic book written by William Luther Pierce. Pierce was better known as the author of the white supremacist novel The Turner Diaries and the leader of the National Alliance organization. The drawing and lettering were done by Daniel "Rip" Roush and the coloring was done by William White Williams. Created as part of a National Alliance effort to recruit teenagers, it was published in 1993 by National Vanguard Books, their publishing outfit. It was intended to be the first issue in a series, though no other issues were ever published. The comic received negative reviews for its racist ideology, content, and art quality.

== Background ==
The National Alliance is an American white supremacist group founded by, and at the time of the book's publication, led by, William Luther Pierce. Pierce, a former physics professor turned neo-Nazi, was better known as the author of The Turner Diaries, a white supremacist novel that became infamous for its inspiration of several terrorist acts. He also wrote another novel on similar topics, Hunter, in 1989.

The Saga of White Will was made as part of an effort by the National Alliance to appeal to young people, particularly recruiting high school students. Pierce bought the hate rock label Resistance Records in 1999 in order to achieve the same aim. The comic was written by Pierce. The colorist was William White Williams. The main character is named and modeled off of Williams, then the NA's membership coordinator. After the publication of the comic, other white supremacists nicknamed him White Will. He eventually succeeded Pierce as leader of the National Alliance.

The drawing and lettering were done by Daniel "Rip" Roush. Roush was a skinhead cartoonist and musician, bass player of the white power band Midtown Bootboys. He had previously drawn cartoons for the white supremacist magazine The Oklahoma Separatist. He was voted its "Racist of the Month". In 1990, he was arrested with five other skinheads (including one of his bandmates) on charges of attacking minorities in Tulsa, Oklahoma, in several different incidents over a several month period from 1988 to 1989. He was sentenced to 42 months in prison in 1991.

== Publication history ==
The Saga of White Will was released in 1993, published by National Vanguard Books, the publishing house of the National Alliance, out of Hillsboro, West Virginia. It was released as New World Order Comix #1: The Sage of... White Will!! It was the first issue of what was intended to be a series with multiple comics, however, no other issues of this series were ever released. It is 37 pages long. Several thousand copies were published. In 1993, copies were sold for 3 dollars a copy when sold individually and 1 dollar for a copy when bought per 100. The comic was republished by the National Alliance's Cosmotheist Books in 2021.

It was targeted at 15 to 18-year-olds, and circulated across the United States on high school and college campuses. The inside cover of the comic displays an advertisement, with the main character saying: "Hey kids! Help me get the word out! Together, we can blow the lid off this rotten system! Order extra copies of this book for your friends. Spread them around your school." On the back there is an in-character advertisement for the National Alliance, describing it as "the most politically-incorrect organization there ever was".

== Plot ==
The story takes place in an urban, multicultural high school; black students regularly rob and bully the white students, and the school administration is controlled by Jews. Walking to school, Will sees a white teen being attacked by several black teens, but is unable to help. In class, his teacher claims that Hannibal, Cleopatra, and Beethoven were all black. When Will objects, a Jewish student, Izzy Rabinowitz, calls him racist and their teacher threatens to report him for racism. Will complains to his girlfriend, Lois Lane, and his nerdy best friend, Bobby "Books" O'Brien. Books says that his dad has many "politically incorrect" books which he invites Will to study. A black basketball player then harasses Will's girlfriend, leading to a brawl between them, which Will wins.

At home, Books' father, O'Brien, lectures his son and Will, saying the lies they are taught in school is part of a plan by the New World Order to turn all white people into "wiggers", without white pride or identity. O'Brien is a member of the National Alliance and offers Will their literature. Over the next few days, now fully convinced of white supremacy, Will begins lecturing to other white teenagers about white racism. He and Books organize the white students into a protest. Rabinowitz, afraid that the white students will become racially conscious, forces the principal to start an anti-hate assembly. There, a black student lectures the white students about giving black people a chance and to let black men sexually harass them and take their money. The assembly is crashed by Will, who lectures about racial differences and the necessity of racial segregation.

As a result, Will is pulled off the stage and expelled, but Books and Lois continue spreading his message. Rabinowitz bribes the "wiggers" and the black students with drugs into forming an anti-hate group to physically attack Will's friends and supporters, bribing the police to not intervene. Will and his followers attack them back, scaring them off. Rabinowitz organizes another anti-hate demonstration, planning to attack all who object; however, a radical black nationalist student, Leroy X, objects to his plan and, agreeing with Will about racial separatism, decides to warn Will. Will and his associates take over the rally and ruin it. Now supported by the National Alliance, Will and his friends prepare to keep organizing.

== Reception and analysis ==
Mike Sangiacomo, reviewing it for The Plain Dealer, said The Saga of White Will was "the most racist piece of propaganda I have ever seen in comic book form" and that it "pushed the envelope of bad taste". The anti-hate organization the Southern Poverty Law Center (SPLC) claimed that The Saga of White Will was "met with derision among its intended audience", while Abraham Foxman of the Anti-Defamation League described it as a popular item in the National Alliance catalog, works that were "favorites with white supremacists of all ages". Christi Bradnox of Vice found it to be funny, and said it "takes a totally absurd vision of the 'black threat' and creates a gut-bustingly hilarious story that, at the very least, makes a great coffee table book." Scholar Damon T. Berry described it as containing "the same pattern demonstrated in Pierce's other fiction [...] the taking on of an antiwhite establishment and the violent retaliation against perceived injustices", though he said it was done on a much smaller scale here than in Pierce's other fiction books. He compared White Will to the protagonists of Pierce's other two novels.

Sangiacomo further said that beyond his disagreement with its views, The Saga of White Will was low quality in terms of art and writing, saying the art "looks like it was done by a 6-year-old with a watercolor set". The SPLC called it "crude, racist", and "amateurish", and said that the novel "frequently depicted its protagonist [...] beating up Jewish people and confronting people of color". Foxman characterized the comic as "racist, anti-Semitic" and as "insidious writings [that] are made available to various extremist organizations to help with their recruitment activities". David Mills of The Washington Post said it was "not cheaply done", describing the story as "set in a nightmarishly 'multicultural' high school of the present", with the white students portrayed as oppressed by Jews and black people. Sangiacomo wrote that it "depicts black people as freeloading thugs, out to rewrite history and molest white women".

The magazine Factsheet Five compared it to the Christian Chick tracts, particularly the Crusaders series, except instead of being focused on Christianity, it was focused on promoting racism. They wrote that, comparing the two, if you replaced "the Jews and miscegenators for the Satanists, and propaganda-filled public schools that submit to any organized pressure group for the propaganda-filled public schools that submit to any organized pressure group and you should get the idea of what this comic is." The story is especially focused on combating "political correctness". Berry said the main character of the comic, as in Pierce's other fiction works, expressed the concepts of the racist esoteric religion that Pierce had created, Cosmotheism, though it does not mention Cosmotheism by name. Berry wrote that the ideology of Cosmotheism was essentially the focus of Will's speech in the story and said that the comic "should be read not only as an expression of National Alliance’s political aspirations but also as an expression of the fundamental points of Cosmotheism".
