= Honky =

Insult for white people

Honky (also spelled honkey) is a derogatory term used to refer to white people, predominantly heard in the United States. The first recorded use of "honky" in this context may date back to 1946.

== Etymology ==
The exact origins of the word are generally unknown and postulations about the subject vary.

=== Central European ===
Honky may be a variant of hunky, which was a derivative of Bohunk, a slur for various Slavic and Hungarian immigrants who moved to America from the Austro-Hungarian Empire in the early 1900s.

=== Wolof ===
Honky may also derive from the term "xonq nopp" which, in the West African language Wolof, literally means "red-eared person". The term may have originated with Wolof-speaking people brought to the U.S. It has been used by Black Americans as a pejorative for white people.

=== Other ===
Honky may have come from coal miners in Oak Hill, West Virginia. The miners were segregated; Black people in one section, English-speaking whites in another. Foreigners who could not speak English, mostly white people, were separated from both groups into an area known as "Hunk Hill". These male laborers were known as "Hunkies".

The term may have begun in the meat packing plants of Chicago. According to Robert Hendrickson, author of the Encyclopedia of Word and Phrase Origins, Black workers in Chicago meatpacking plants picked up the term from white workers and began applying it indiscriminately to all white people.

== Notable uses ==
The adoption of honky as a pejorative is attested as early in 1967 by black militants within Student Nonviolent Coordinating Committee (SNCC) seeking a rebuttal for the term nigger. The Department of Defense stated in 1967 that National Chairman of the SNCC, H. Rap Brown, told a Black audience in Cambridge, Maryland that "You should burn that school down and then go take over the honkie's school" on June 24, 1967. Brown went on to say: "[I]f America don't come 'round, we got to burn it down. You better get some guns, brother. The only thing the honky respects is a gun. You give me a gun and tell me to shoot my enemy, I might shoot Lady Bird."

In the 1968 trial of Black Panther Party member Huey Newton, fellow Panther Eldridge Cleaver created pins for Newton's white supporters stating "Honkies for Huey".

"Father of the Blues" W. C. Handy wrote of "Negroes and hunkies" in his autobiography.

=== Use in music ===
In the 2012 rap song "Thrift Shop" by Macklemore & Ryan Lewis ft. Wanz, "Damn, that's a cold ass honkey!" is used in reference to Macklemore and his secondhand clothes. Eminem, who is also a white American rapper, uses the line "He looked at me and said, 'You gonna die, honkey!'" in 1999's "Brain Damage." "Play That Funky Music," a 1976 disco/funk hit by Wild Cherry about a rock band adapting to the rise of disco, substitutes "honky" for "white boy" in the final chorus of the uncensored version. The British band Hot Chocolate used "honky" and "spook" in their controversial 1973 hit single "Brother Louie" about an interracial relationship as the terms chosen by the respective fathers to slur their child's newfound lover.

Other uses of "honky" in music include Honky (an album by Melvins), Honky Reduction (an album by Agoraphobic Nosebleed), MC Honky (DJ stage persona), Honky Château (an album by Elton John, the first track on which is "Honky Cat"), Talkin' Honky Blues (an album by Buck 65), and Honky (an album by Keith Emerson). Honky's Ladder is a 1996 EP by The Afghan Whigs. In 2022 Hank Williams Jr. released a blues album Rich White Honky Blues.

The Chicago style of polka music is also known as honky polka.

=== Use in television and film ===
Honky is a 1971 movie based on an interracial relationship, starring Brenda Sykes as Sheila Smith and John Neilson as Wayne "Honky" Devine.

In the 1980 movie The Blues Brothers, Mrs Murphy (Aretha Franklin) refers to Jake and Elwood as "two honkies… dressed like Hasidic diamond merchants."

In a sketch on Saturday Night Live (SNL), Chevy Chase and Richard Pryor used both nigger (Chase) and honky (Pryor) in reference to one another during a "racist word association interview". During this period, Steve Martin (as musical guest and stand-up regular on SNL) performed a rendition of "King Tut" which contained the word honky in its lyrics.

On the TV series Barney Miller, Season 5, Episode 8, "Loan Shark", Arthur Dietrich gives an etymology of the word "honky", claiming it was "coined by Blacks in the 1950s in reference to the nasal tone of Caucasians".

On the TV series The Jeffersons, George Jefferson regularly referred to a white person as a honky (or whitey) as did Redd Foxx on Sanford and Son. This word would later be popularized in episodes of Mork & Mindy by Robin Williams and Jonathan Winters.

== See also ==
- Buckra
- Cracker
- Hillbilly
- List of ethnic slurs
- Redneck
- Whitey (slang)
- White Anglo-Saxon Protestants
- Honky-tonk
