= Oh! Susanna =

1848 American song by Stephen Foster

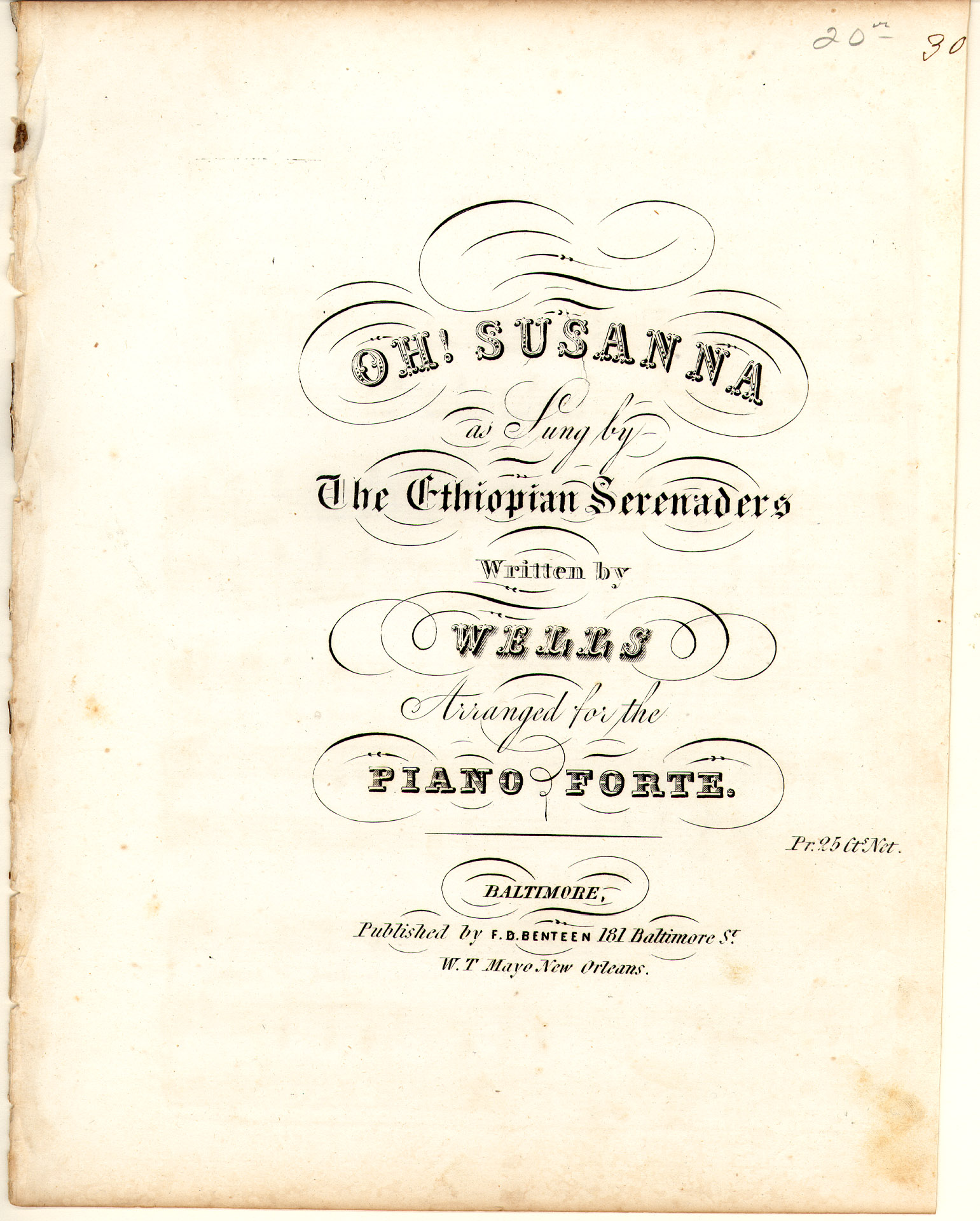
- Original sheet music (1848)

Song
- Published: 1848
- Genre: Folk
- Songwriter: Stephen Foster

"Oh! Susanna" is a folk song by Stephen Foster (1826–1864), first published in 1848. It is among the most popular American songs ever written. Although the song is about the South, members of the Western Writers of America in 2010 chose it as one of the Top 100 Western songs of all time.

== Background ==
In 1846 in Cincinnati, Ohio, Stephen Foster wrote "Oh! Susanna", a song about the South, and published it in 1848. The song was first performed by a local quintet at a concert in Andrews' Eagle Ice Cream Saloon in Pittsburgh, Pennsylvania, on September 11, 1847. It was first published by W. C. Peters & Co. in Cincinnati in 1848.

Minstrel troupe performances made the song a huge hit. As was common at the time, many registered the song for copyright under their own names. As a result, it was copyrighted and published at least twenty-one times from February 25, 1848, through February 14, 1851. Foster earned just $100 ($2,774 in 2016 dollars) for the song, but its popularity led the publishing firm Firth, Pond & Company to offer him a royalty rate of two cents per copy of sheet music sold, convincing him to become the first fully professional songwriter in the United States.

== Song ==
"Oh! Susanna"
Stephen Foster's "Oh! Susanna" performed by the United States Navy Concert Band

The song blends a variety of musical traditions. The opening line refers to "a banjo on [the singer's] knee", but the song takes its beat from the polka, which had just reached the U.S. from Europe. Writer and musician Glenn Weiser suggests that the song incorporates elements of two previous compositions, both published in 1846: "Mary Blane", by Billy Whitlock, and "Rose of Alabama", by Silas S. Steele. He points out that the melody of the verse of "Oh! Susanna" resembles that of "Mary Blane", and the opening of the chorus of "Oh! Susanna" is almost identical to that of "Rose of Alabama". Moreover, the story lines of both "Oh! Susanna" and "The Rose of Alabama" involve a lover going from one Deep Southern state to another with his banjo in search of his sweetheart, which suggests that Foster got the inspiration for his lyrics from Steele's song.

The first two phrases of the melody are based on the major pentatonic scale.

The song contains contradictory lines such as "It rain'd all night the day I left, The weather it was dry, The sun so hot I froze to death...", which have been described as "nonsense" in the wake of the redaction of the original racist lyrics which depicted black people as dim-witted. It is one of the songs by Foster that uses the word "nigger" (in original version only; others are "Old Uncle Ned" and "Oh! Lemuel", both also among Foster's early works), which appears in the second verse ("De lectric fluid magnified, And kill'd five hundred nigger.").

== Popularity and adaptations ==
"Oh Susanna, or, Don't you cry for me", a quickstep version, 1848

"Oh! Susanna"
1917 performance of "Oh! Susanna" by The Peerless Quartet and Harry C. Browne

The song is one of Stephen Foster's best-known songs, and it also is one of the best-known American songs. At the time, no American song had sold more than 5,000 copies of the sheet music; "Oh! Susanna" sold over 100,000. Unabashedly racist in its original lyrics and about the Deep South, it later became known as an "unofficial theme of the Forty-Niners," with new lyrics about traveling to California with a "washpan on my knee" to replace the original reference of the banjo on the African American narrator's knee. A traditional Pennsylvania Dutch version uses Foster's melody but replaces the lyrics entirely.

=== Notable recordings ===
- One of the earliest recordings, using the original racist lyrics, was released by Harry C. Browne in 1916 (Columbia COL A-2218).
- Dan Hornsby, a famous Columbia Records artist in the early 1920s, released the song under worldwide distribution (Columbia 1268D).
- A 1955 novelty recording of the song by The Singing Dogs reached No. 22 on the US Billboard Pop Singles chart, and No. 13 in the UK.
- Bing Crosby included the song in a medley on his album 101 Gang Songs (1961).
- In 1963, The Big 3 recorded Tim Rose's composition "The Banjo Song", which sets Foster's lyrics to a new melody. Rose's melody was then used for Shocking Blue's 1969 hit "Venus". Neil Young and Crazy Horse covered Rose's version on their 2012 album Americana.
- "Oh! Susanna" was the last track on the second album by The Byrds, Turn! Turn! Turn!, in 1965.
- James Taylor also included a version of the song on his second album, Sweet Baby James, in 1970.
- Mixue Ice Cream & Tea, a Chinese multinational fast-food restaurant chain specializing in ice cream and tea-based drinks, adapted the song's melody for its theme song.
