= Nigger (Clawfinger song) =

Single by Clawfinger

from the album Deaf Dumb Blind
- B-side: "Get It"; "Love"
- Written: 1991
- Released: 12 November 1993
- Genre: Rap metal
- Length: 3:48
- Label: Warner Music Group
- Songwriter: Clawfinger
- Producers: Jacob Hellner; Clawfinger

Clawfinger singles chronology
"Nigger" (1993)	"The Truth" (1993)

Music video
- "Nigger" on YouTube

"Nigger" is the debut single by Swedish rap metal band Clawfinger. First released on a three-track demo before appearing as the opening track on their debut album, Deaf Dumb Blind (1993), the song was an immediate success for the band, reaching No. 4 on Norway's singles charts and No. 22 in Sweden.

Lead singer Zak Tell has always been adamant that the song contains an anti-racist message, which he emphasises before performing the song live. The track's lyrical content has also been described as "provocative and critically relevant." However, controversy surrounding the song has led to the band never playing a concert in North America.

"Nigger" was performed at every Clawfinger concert as of 2019 but in 2024, Tell said that the band had stopped playing the song out of respect for changing times.

== Lyrical content ==
Clawfinger frontman Zak Tell wrote the song in 1991 as a 20-year old, wanting to spread an anti-racist message. Tell listened to early hip hop groups including Public Enemy, A Tribe Called Quest and De La Soul growing up, and when writing "Nigger", said, "I was angry and I was slightly confused. I didn't think about what I was 'allowed' to say or not." In 2019, Tell said that "Nigger" was the most important song that he ever wrote.

Clawfinger has never performed in North America because of a threat the band received after the release of "Nigger". The band's record label received a fax in Los Angeles that said, "White guys trying to tell black people how to live their lives should have their balls cut off." This led to the end of Clawfinger's promotion in the United States. It is the only region that the band has never played. "It would have been quite easy if we had only had one black band member or if the band had been brown, then it wouldn't have been a problem at all," Tell said.

In a 1994 interview with Billboard, Tell said that Americans had misunderstood the song, saying "It was invented by slave traders. I'm telling people I can't quite understand why they would want to use such a word." Historian Todd M. Mealy, in his book The N-Word in Music: An American History, described the message of "Nigger" as "a declaration that the word is and always will be a racial slur, and that Blacks on any continent should refrain from saying it regardless of the connotation."

The provocativeness of Tell's lyrics was influenced by punk rock bands like the Sex Pistols and the Dead Kennedys. Tell continued to combine humour, metal music and what he called "lyrics with a big middle finger" on "The Faggot in You" and "Right to Rape" from the band's 2005 album Hate Yourself with Style. Tell said in 2005, and again in 2019 that he would not write the song the same way nowadays because "there is a different political climate and more political correctness than in the 90s. This song would certainly bring us more trouble today than it did back in 1993."

"A lot of people don't really understand the song. But the message still applies – in many areas and around the world. We all know it's not a racist song. And it's clear what we mean by that. This message can't be wrong at all. That's why we can still play this song. Of course, our fans in particular know the message. But I also knew that taking the song out of context and playing it to a different audience could become difficult. Then there could certainly be heated reactions. But when we play it in our own context, that's never a problem."

— Zak Tell

== Retirement ==
In a June 2024 interview with French YouTube channel LoudTV, Tell said that Clawfinger no longer performed "Nigger" live out of respect for the changing political climate, specifically citing the Black Lives Matter movement. He explained, "it's not because we don't stand by it, 'cause we stand by those lyrics in that song 100 percent, but it's to be respectful to the way the world is right now... in reality, we're just a small stupid fucking rock band. And this topic is so much bigger than that."

== Track listing ==
- CD: MVG Records / MVGCDS 7
1. "Nigger" – 3:48
2. "Get It" – 4:43
3. "Love" – 3:01

== Charts ==
Chart (1993)	Peak position
Europe (Eurochart Hot 100)	93
Norway (VG-lista)	4
Sweden (Sverigetopplistan)	22
