= Clawfinger =

Swedish rap metal band

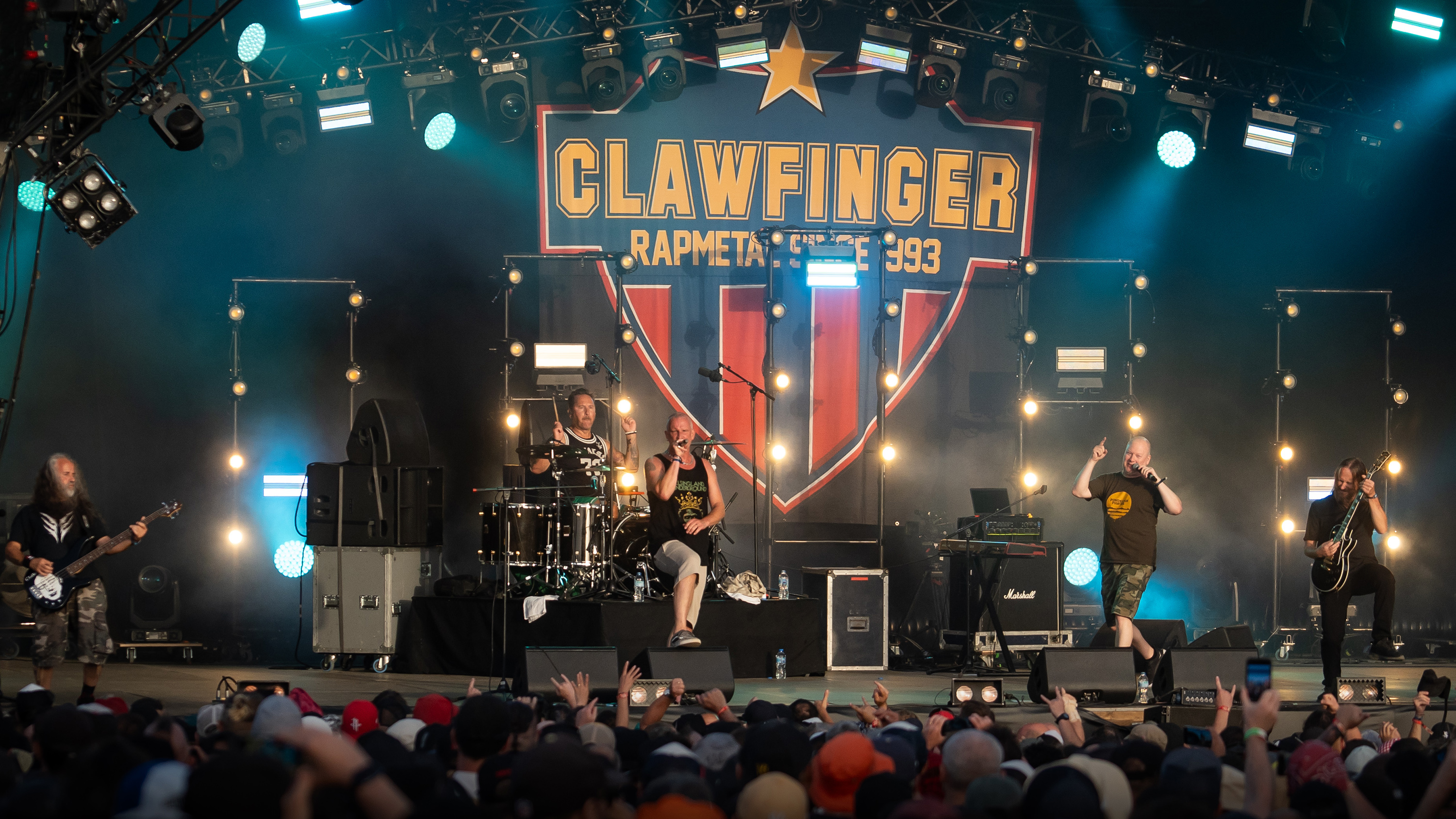
- Clawfinger performing in 2024

Background information
- Origin: Stockholm, Sweden
- Genres: Rap metal; nu metal; industrial metal; alternative metal
- Years active: 1989–2013; 2017–present
- Labels: Nuclear Blast; WEA/WMG
- Members: Zak Tell; Jocke Skog; Bård Torstensen; André Skaug; Micke Dahlén
- Past members: Henka Johansson; Erlend Ottem; Morten Skaug; Ottar Vigerstøl
- Website: clawfinger.net

Clawfinger is a Swedish rap metal band formed in Stockholm in 1989. Considered pioneers of the rap metal genre, the band had their international and commercial breakthrough in 1993 with the release of their debut album, Deaf Dumb Blind. The band's musical style is described as aggressive, melodic and groovy, with lyrics tackling politics and social issues such as racism and war. Clawfinger has released seven studio albums and sold over 1.5 million albums worldwide.

== History ==
=== Formation and debut album: 1989–1993 ===
Clawfinger's origin dates back to mid-1989, when Zak Tell and Jocke Skog met while working together at Rosenlund Hospital in Stockholm. In 1990, they were joined by the Norwegian guitarists Bård Torstensen and Erlend Ottem who were also working at the hospital. Based on their similar interests in music, the four formed the first line-up of Clawfinger.

The band's line-up was solidified with the addition of bassist André Skaug and drummer Morten Skaug in 1992. Clawfinger's original demo, comprising three tracks ("Waste of Time", "Nigger" and "Profit Preacher"), quickly secured local radio airplay and consequently brought them to the attention of the music label MVG Records. The single "Nigger", an anti-racism statement, caused controversy upon release, but proved to be a massive success. In April 1993, Clawfinger released their debut album Deaf Dumb Blind. Produced by the band and Jacob Hellner, the album sold over 600,000 copies worldwide and was critically acclaimed by the Swedish press. Later that year, Clawfinger performed at several European festivals and opened for Anthrax and Alice in Chains on their European tours.

=== Use Your Brain and Clawfinger: 1994–1998 ===
Following the release of their debut album, the band received several awards, including two Grammis during the Swedish Grammy Awards in 1994 in the categories Hard Rock/Metal of the Year and Music Video of the Year. That same year, original drummer Skaug was replaced by Ottar Vigerstøl. After a headlining tour in support of their debut album, Clawfinger returned to the studio with producer Hellner to record their second studio album, Use Your Brain. The album was released 1995 and a new touring campaign followed. The band notably participated at Ozzy Osbourne's Monsters of Rock Festival in Argentina, Brazil and Chile that year, appearing alongside American metal counterparts like Megadeth, Faith No More and Alice Cooper. After returning to Europe, Clawfinger continued their touring by performing headlining shows and appearing at festivals.

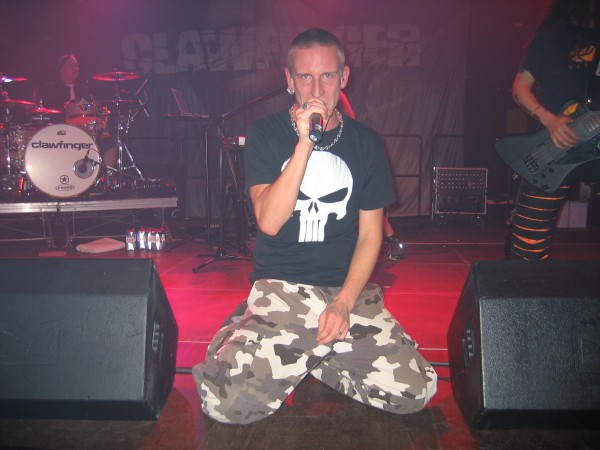
Vocalist Zak Tell in 2006

In 1997, Clawfinger's self-titled album was released, their first with new drummer Henka Johansson, who replaced Vigerstøl that same year. The album's opening track, "Two Sides", notably expanded the band's soundscape by featuring female choir vocals and Middle Eastern-influenced sounds, while the rest of the album maintained the band's aggressive metal sound and socio-political lyrics. Clawfinger yielded three singles ("Biggest & the Best", "Two Sides", "Don't Wake Me Up") and two music videos for the singles "Biggest & the Best" and "Two Sides".

=== A Whole Lot of Nothing and Zeroes & Heroes: 1999–2004 ===
Clawfinger's fourth studio album, A Whole Lot of Nothing, was released on 23 July 2001. The album was the band's first collaboration with producer Hellner in six years and saw the band adopting an industrial and electronic sound in a larger scale than previous albums with the use of synthesizers.

In 2002, the band released their fifth studio album, Zeros & Heroes. The album caused controversy upon release in America due to its open critique of then-president George W. Bush and US military politics following the 11 September 2001 attacks. Clawfinger would again experiment with new and different sounds for new recordings, opting for complex and melodic guitar riffs as opposed to the electronic and industrial sound of their previous album. In 2003, lead guitarist Ottem departed the band to pursue a career as a software specialist.

=== Hate Yourself with Style and Life Will Kill You: 2005–2011 ===
In 2005, Clawfinger released the album Hate Yourself with Style. The album continued the musical style of Zeros & Heroes with a hard rock style of melodic and fast guitar riffs. The album's limited edition featured a bonus disc with live footage from the band's performance at the Greenfield Festival in Switzerland in 2005 and music videos for all of the band's singles up to their third studio album.

In 2007, the band's seventh studio album, Life Will Kill You, was released. The album spawned three singles: "Prisoners", "The Price We Pay" and "Little Baby". In 2008, long-time drummer Johansson left the band after eleven years and was replaced by Micke Dahlén. In August 2009, Clawfinger announced that they had been working on a re-recording of their debut album, Deaf Dumb Blind, that would feature guest musicians, including members of Rammstein and Peter Tägtgren.

=== Disbandment, occasional reunions and singles: 2012–2025 ===
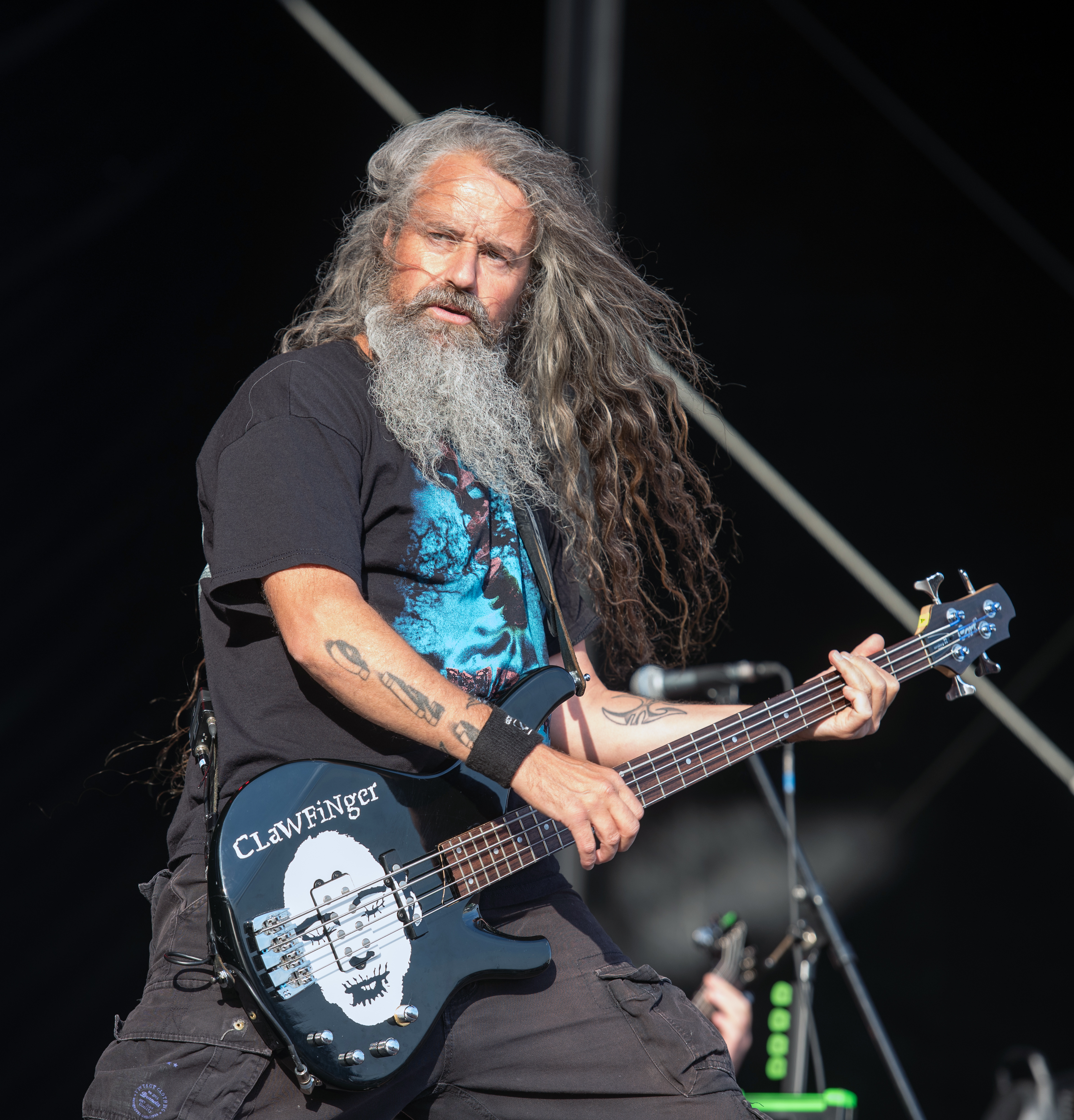
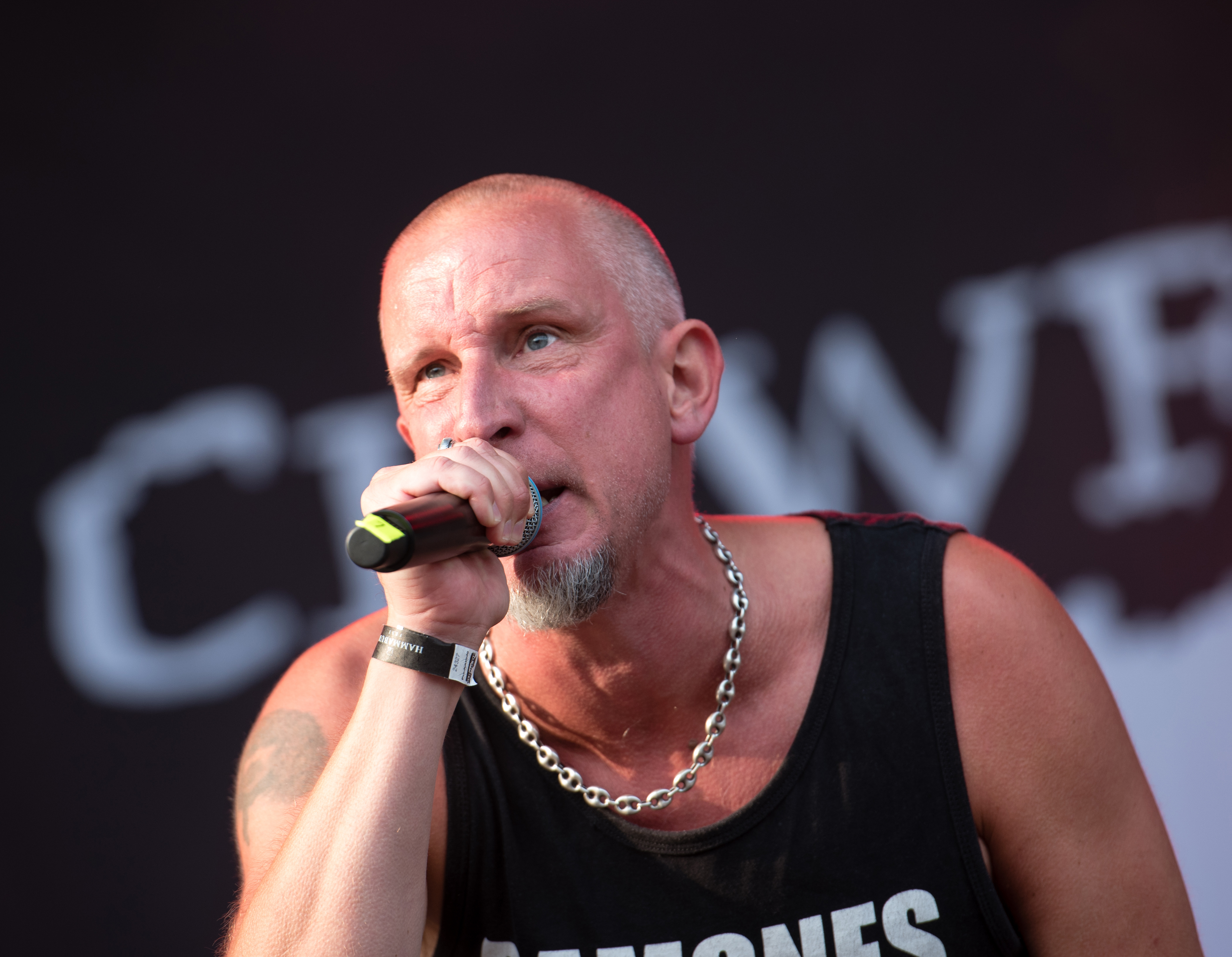
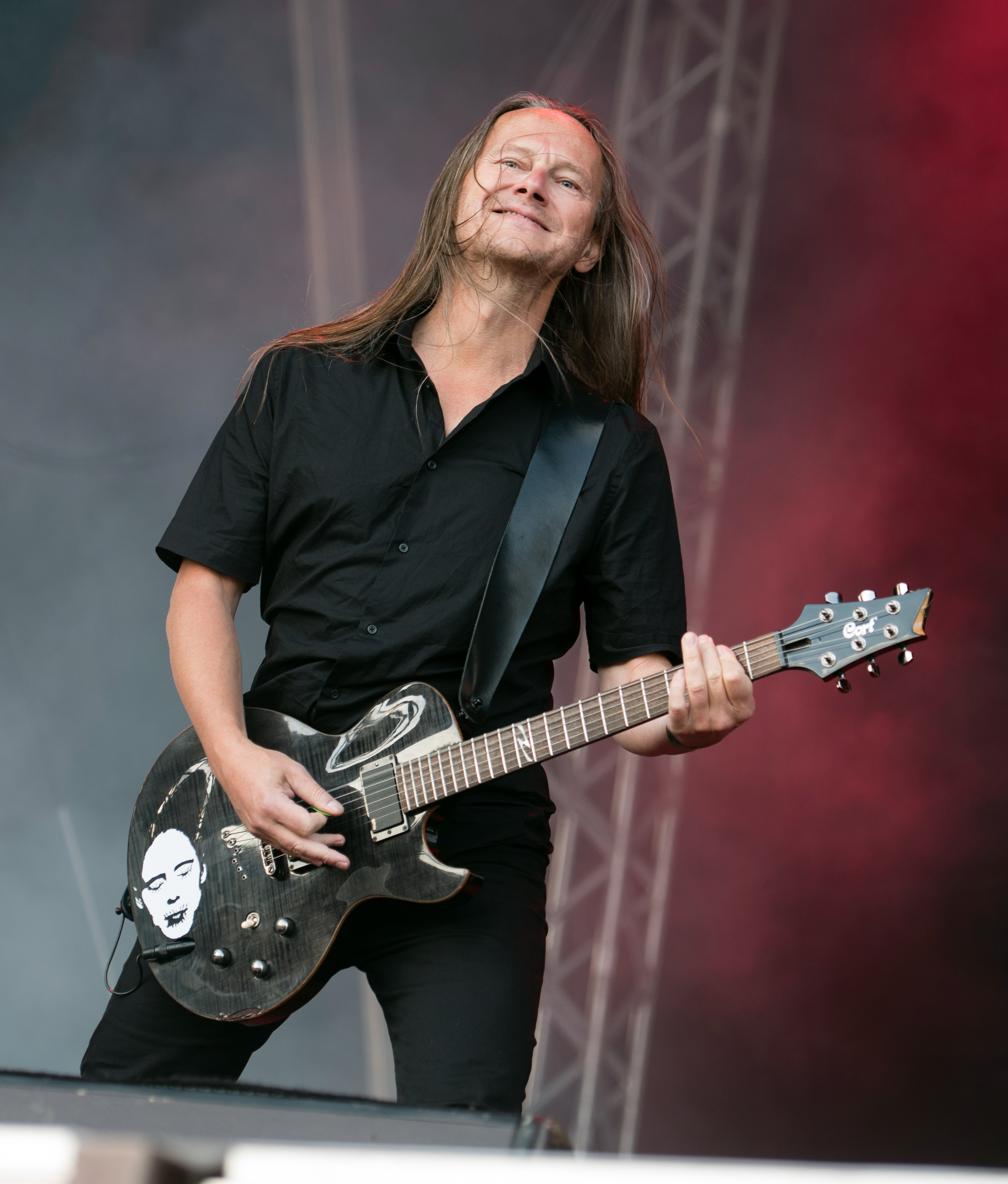
Clawfinger at Hammaburg Fest 2019

In August 2013, Clawfinger announced that the band had disbanded. In May 2014, the band announced that they would perform a one-off show at the ZAKHID festival in Ukraine on 8 August 2014. The band would later perform additional one-off reunion shows, including two shows in 2015, two festival appearances in 2016 at Denmark's CopenHell Festival and Bulgaria's Summer Chaos Festival, and a performance at the Irreversible Festival 2017 in Switzerland.

On 4 August 2017, the band released the single "Save Our Souls", their first new material in ten years. Two years later, a new single, "Tear You Down", was released on 4 October 2019. The band's latest single, "Environmental Patients", was released on 4 March 2022. In June of that year, the band performed at Sweden Rock Festival.

=== Before We All Die: 2025–2026 ===
On 21 June 2025, Clawfinger announced they had signed a new record deal with Perception Label - A division of Reigning Phoenix Music, and that they would be releasing a new song, Scum. The new album Before We All Die was released on 20 February 2026.

== Members ==
Current line-up

- Zak Tell – lead vocals (1989–2013, 2017–present)
- Jocke Skog – keyboards, backing vocals (1989–2013, 2017–present)
- Bård Torstensen – rhythm guitar (1990–2013, 2017–present), lead guitar (2003–2013, 2017–present)
- André Skaug – bass (1992–2013, 2017–present)
- Micke Dahlén – drums (2008–2013, 2017–present)

Former members

- Erlend Ottem – lead guitar (1990–2003)
- Morten Skaug – drums (1992–1994)
- Ottar Vigerstøl – drums (1994–1997)
- Henka Johansson – drums (1997–2008)

== Discography ==
- Deaf Dumb Blind (1993)
- Use Your Brain (1995)
- Clawfinger (1997)
- A Whole Lot of Nothing (2001)
- Zeros & Heroes (2003)
- Hate Yourself with Style (2005)
- Life Will Kill You (2007)
- Before We All Die (2026)
