= White nigger =

Ethnic slur

White nigger is a slur referring to a lower-class White person. The term nigger is a racial slur that refers to a Black American, typically one of low socioeconomic status.

== United States ==
Dating from the nineteenth-century United States, "white nigger" was a derogatory and offensive term for a "black person who defers to white people or accepts a role prescribed by them", or "a white person who does menial work". It was later used as a slur against white activists involved in the civil rights movement such as Viola Liuzzo, James Groppi, Bill Baxley, and Jonathan Daniels.

The term "white niggers" was uttered twice by Democratic Senator Robert Byrd of West Virginia in an interview on national television in 2001. Byrd was a former member of the Ku Klux Klan.

=== Italian immigrants ===
During all the 19th century until the early part of the 20th, Italian immigrants in the United States were often referred to as "white niggers".

=== Irish immigrants ===
The term was applied to Irish immigrants and their descendants. Irish were also nicknamed "Negroes turned inside-out" (while African Americans would be referred to as "smoked Irish").

=== Polish immigrants ===
Texas blacks referred to Polish immigrants as dem white niggahs or dem white niggas whom they held in undisguised contempt but were apparently stunned by their high literacy rates. Polish farmers commonly worked directly with southern blacks in east Texas, and they were commonly in direct competition for agricultural jobs. Blacks frequently picked up a few words of Polish, and Poles picked up some of the black English dialect in these areas during the late 19th century. R. L. Daniels in Lippincott's Monthly Magazine wrote a piece on "Polanders" in Texas in 1888, praising their industriousness and hard work ethic. He cited instances where Polish farmers called their landlords massa, denoting a subordinate position on level with slavery, and, when asking a woman why she left Poland, she replied "Mudder haf much childs and 'Nough not to eat all". Daniels found that Poles were efficient farmers and planted corn and cotton so close to their homes as not to leave even elbow room to the nearby buildings.

== Canada ==
In another use of the term, Pierre Vallières's work White Niggers of America refers to French Canadians. Vallières used the phrase to highlight a feeling among French-speaking Québécois people of being treated as second-class citizens under an English-speaking ruling class in Quebec.

== Colonial India ==
"White Nigger" was a nickname given to the nineteenth-century British explorer Richard Francis Burton by colleagues in the Bombay Army, who ostracized him because he immersed himself so completely into the culture of India, including its languages and dress along with forming close relationships with local Indians.

== Ireland ==
"White nigger" was sometimes used to refer to Irish Catholics in the context of the Troubles in Northern Ireland and the civil rights movement there. An example of this use is found in the lyrics of the Elvis Costello song "Oliver's Army" (1979): "Only takes one itchy trigger. / One more widow, one less white nigger". In 1969, the longest-serving editor of The Irish Times, Douglas Gageby, was allegedly called a "white nigger" by company chairman Thomas Bleakley McDowell, because of his support for the Northern Ireland civil rights movement.

In May 2016, Irish politician Gerry Adams, the president of Sinn Féin, attracted controversy after tweeting: "Watching Django Unchained — A Ballymurphy Nigger!" After criticism for the use of a racial slur, Adams deleted the tweet and, from a Belfast press conference, he issued a statement saying, "I have acknowledged that the use of the N-word was inappropriate. That is why I deleted the tweet. I apologise for any offence caused." Adams added, "I stand over the context and main point of my tweet, which were the parallels between people in struggle. Like African Americans, Irish nationalists were denied basic rights. I have long been inspired by Harriet Tubman, Frederick Douglass, Rosa Parks, Martin Luther King and Malcolm X, who stood up for themselves and for justice."

== Haiti ==
Haiti's first Head of state Jean-Jacques Dessalines called Polish people "the White Negroes of Europe", which was then regarded a great honour as it meant brotherhood between Poles and Haitians after Polish Legionnaires joined the black Haitian slaves during the Haitian Revolution, contributing to the establishment of the world's first free black republic and the first independent Caribbean state. Dessalines also gave the Poles a special status as Noir (legally considered to be black) and full citizenship under the Haitian constitution.

About 160 years later, in the mid-twentieth century, François Duvalier, the president of Haiti who was known for his black nationalist and Pan-African views, used the same concept of "European white Negroes" while referring to Polish people and glorifying their patriotism.

== See also ==
- Cultural appropriation
- Nigger
- White ethnic
- White trash
- Wigger
- "Woman Is the Nigger of the World" (John Lennon song)
