= Hate Yourself with Style =

Studio album by Clawfinger
- Released: 18 November 2005
- Recorded: 2005
- Studio: Studio Medrec
- Genre: Nu metal; rap metal
- Length: 39:23
- Label: Nuclear Blast
- Producer: Clawfinger

Clawfinger chronology
Zeros & Heroes (2003)	Hate Yourself with Style (2005)	Life Will Kill You (2007)

Professional ratings
Review scores
Source	Rating
AllMusic	3/5 stars
Blabbermouth.net	7/10 stars
Chronicles of Chaos	4/10 stars

Hate Yourself with Style is the sixth studio album by Swedish rap metal band Clawfinger, released on 18 November 2005 via Nuclear Blast. It continues the path entered on Zeros & Heroes and is characterized by speedy melodic hard rock guitar riffs. The keyboards which particularly characterized A Whole Lot of Nothing have completely disappeared.

The social commentary within the album (including rants against rapists and positing that homophobes are themselves secretly gay) received both positive and negative reviews.

Unlike the previous albums, where the limited-edition version had two or more bonus tracks, the limited edition of this album has a DVD with live footage from the Greenfield Festival and video clips of all singles up to Clawfinger's third album.

== Track listing ==
All tracks are written by Clawfinger, except where noted.

No.	Title	Writer(s)	Length
1.	"The Faggot in You"		3:26
2.	"Hate Yourself with Style"		3:44
3.	"Dirty Lies"		2:58
4.	"The Best & The Worst"		3:48
5.	"Breakout (Embrace the Child Inside You)"		3:41
6.	"Right to Rape"		4:31
7.	"What We've Got Is What You're Getting"	Clawfinger, Henka Johansson, André Skaug	2:22
8.	"Sick of Myself"		3:22
9.	"Hypocrite"		3:04
10.	"Without a Case"	Clawfinger, Skaug, Erland Ottem	3:40
11.	"God Is Dead"		4:44
Total length:			39:23

=== Limited edition bonus disc ===
Live Greenfield Festival

1. "Rosegrove"
2. "Nigger"
3. "Zeros & Heroes"
4. "Warfair"
5. "Don't Get Me Wrong"
6. "Recipe For Hate"
7. "Biggest & the Best"
8. "The Truth"
9. "Do What I Say"

Video clips

1. "Nigger" (version 2)
2. "The Truth"
3. "Warfair"
4. "Pin Me Down"
5. "Do What I Say"
6. "Tomorrow"
7. "Biggest & The Best"
8. "Two Sides"

== Released singles ==
"Without a Case"

Single by Clawfinger

from the album Hate Yourself with Style
- Released: 2006
- Recorded: 2005
- Genre: Nu metal, alternative metal
- Length: 3:40
- Label: Nuclear Blast
- Songwriter: Clawfinger

- "Dirty Lies"
- "Without a Case"

== Released video clips ==
- "Dirty Lies"
- "Hate Yourself with Style"
- "Without a Case"
