= Deaf Dumb Blind =

Studio album by Clawfinger
- Released: 21 April 1993
- Studios: Decibel (Stockholm, Sweden)
- Genres: Rap metal; alternative metal
- Length: 39:47
- Labels: WEA; MVG
- Producers: Clawfinger; Jacob Hellner

Clawfinger chronology
Deaf Dumb Blind (1993)	Use Your Brain (1995)

Singles from Deaf Dumb Blind
- 1. "Nigger" Released: 1993; 2. "The Truth" Released: 1993; 3. "Rosegrove" Released: 1993; 4. "Warfair" Released: 1994

Professional ratings
Review scores
Source	Rating
AllMusic	3/5 stars
Music Week	2/5 stars
Rock Hard	8.5/10 stars

Deaf Dumb Blind is the debut studio album by Swedish rap metal band Clawfinger, released on 21 April 1993. Produced by the band and Jacob Hellner, the album sold over 600,000 copies worldwide and was critically acclaimed by the Swedish press. The band won a Swedish Grammy Award in the Hard Rock/Metal of the Year category in 1994 for the album. Deaf Dumb Blind spawned four singles, including the successful single "Nigger", a controversial anti-racist statement.

The album contains ten standard tracks; three bonus tracks were added to the re-release in 2004. Clawfinger also released four singles ("Nigger", "The Truth", "Rosegrove" and "Warfair") and three music videos ("Nigger", "The Truth" and "Warfair").

The lyrics of "Catch Me" are translated from the Asta Kask song "Dom Får Aldrig Mig".

== Track listing ==
All tracks are written by Clawfinger.

No.	Title	Length
1.	"Nigger"	3:47
2.	"The Truth"	4:12
3.	"Rosegrove"	4:02
4.	"Don't Get Me Wrong"	3:12
5.	"I Need You"	4:58
6.	"Catch Me"	4:39
7.	"Warfair"	3:48
8.	"Wonderful World"	2:40
9.	"Sad to See Your Sorrow"	5:18
10.	"I Don't Care"	3:11
Total length:		39:47

Bonus tracks
No.	Title	Length
11.	"Get It"	4:44
12.	"Profit Preacher"	5:55
13.	"Stars & Stripes"	3:52

== Personnel ==
Credits adapted from the album's liner notes.

- Erlend Ottem – guitar, group member
- Andre Skaug – bass guitar
- Morten Skaug – drums
- Jocke Skog – keyboards, programming, backing vocals, group member
- Zak Tell – lead vocals, group member
- Bård Torstensen – guitar, backing vocals

Additional personnel

- Martin Beskow – photography
- Clawfinger – producer
- Björn Engelman – mastering
- Stefan Glaumann – mixing
- Lena Granefelt – photography
- Jacob Hellner – producer
- Adam Kviman – engineer
- Per Kviman – A&R
- Sebastian Oberg – cello, soloist, cover design
- Patrik Elofsson – scratches
- Gustave Lund – scratches

== Charts ==
=== Weekly charts ===
Chart (1993–94)	Peak position
Austrian Albums (Ö3 Austria)	16
German Albums (Offizielle Top 100)	32
Swedish Albums (Sverigetopplistan)	5
Swiss Albums (Schweizer Hitparade)	19

=== Year-end charts ===
Chart (1994)	Position
German Albums (Offizielle Top 100)	34

== Certifications ==
Region	Certification	Certified units/sales
Germany (BVMI)	Gold	250,000^{^}
Norway (IFPI Norway)	Gold	25,000^{*}
^{*} Sales figures based on certification alone.^{^} Shipments figures based on certification alone.
