= Word Association (Saturday Night Live) =

SNL sketch

"Word Association", also called "Racist Word Association Interview", "Racist Word Association" and "Dead Honky", is a Saturday Night Live sketch first aired on December 13, 1975, featuring Richard Pryor and Chevy Chase.

== Synopsis ==
At a job interview, the interviewer (Chase) asks the applicant, Mr. Wilson (Pryor), to take a Word Association test. Partway through the test, the interviewer begins using increasingly offensive anti-black racial slurs, to which Wilson reacts with anti-white slurs (including "honky"). Finally, the interviewer says "nigger", to which Wilson replies, "Dead honky" and glares at the interviewer, his face twitching. The interviewer, frightened, offers him the job, as well as paid vacation and the highest janitor's salary in the country.

== Origin ==
Authorship of the sketch is disputed, with claims being made both by Chase and by Paul Mooney.

According to Mooney, when Pryor agreed to perform on Saturday Night Live, one of his conditions was that Mooney be hired as a scriptwriter. Mooney's interactions with Lorne Michaels and NBC executives were not positive, and he wrote the sketch as a direct response. He also noted that Pryor "despise(d)" Chase:

After all the bullshit I've been put through to get here, the fucking cross-examination Lorne subjects me to, I decide to do a job interview of my own. Chevy's the boss, interviewing Richard for a janitor's job. The white personnel interviewer suggests they do some word association, so he can test if the black man's fit to employ.

Chase, conversely, has described it as the result of a peaceful collaboration with Pryor, in which the paucity of anti-white slurs, relative to anti-black slurs, was "reflective of the lack of bigotry in [Pryor]."

== Reception ==
In 2014, Rolling Stone ranked the sketch No. 10 in their list of the 50 "greatest Saturday Night Live sketches of all time", while in 2011, Paste ranked it No. 5 in their list of the 10 "most shocking moments" — an opinion shared by VH1. Don Cheadle declared it one of his favorite sketches, as did Keegan-Michael Key and Albert Brooks.

Today described it as "[o]ne of (Pryor's) most famous sketches" and a "signature moment() in SNL history", while Vulture observed that its "climax still feels dangerous and revelatory".

Pryor biographer Scott Saul stated that the use of the phrase 'dead honky' "transforms the word association test from a language game into a contest of wills, in which righteous courage is bound to prevail." Cultural historian Nick Marx described this as a transition from "a war of words (into) the threat of bodily harm", which he compared to "an articulation of a range of strategies for black oppositionality — from resentful protest to violent revolt".

The sketch has been cited in academic works on racism.
