= Life Will Kill You =

Studio album by Clawfinger
- Released: 27 July 2007
- Studio: Fear and Loathing Studios, Spånga; Hulveien 7, Arendal
- Genre: Rap metal; alternative metal; nu metal
- Length: 44:21
- Label: Nuclear Blast
- Producer: Clawfinger

Clawfinger chronology
| Hate Yourself with Style (2005) | Life Will Kill You (2007) | Before We All Die (2026) |

Life Will Kill You is the seventh studio album by Swedish rap metal band Clawfinger, released on 27 July 2007 through Nuclear Blast. The album was self-produced by the band and recorded at Fear and Loathing Studios in Spånga and Hulveien 7 in Arendal. The record is the last album released by the band before their breakup in mid-2013.

== Track listing ==
All tracks are written by Clawfinger.

| No. | Title | Length |
|---|---|---|
| 1. | "The Price We Pay" | 3:34 |
| 2. | "Life Will Kill You" | 3:34 |
| 3. | "Prisoners" | 3:52 |
| 4. | "Final Stand" | 4:39 |
| 5. | "None the Wiser" | 4:38 |
| 6. | "Little Baby" | 3:46 |
| 7. | "The Cure & the Poison" | 5:53 |
| 8. | "Where Can We Go from Here?" | 4:05 |
| 9. | "It's Your Life" | 3:28 |
| 10. | "Falling" | 3:39 |
| 11. | "Carnivore" | 3:13 |
| Total length: | | 44:21 |

Bonus tracks
| No. | Title | Length |
|---|---|---|
| 12. | "Dying to Know" | 3:33 |
| 13. | "Picture Perfect Skies" | 3:35 |

== Personnel ==
- Backing vocals – Barbie Swan
- Cello – Emma Haake
- Cover, design, layout – Joakim Hedestedt, Zak Tell
- Mastered by – Björn Engelmann
- Mixed by – Jocke Skog
- Recorded by [additional recordings] – Bård Torstensen
- Written by, recorded by, producer – Clawfinger
