= A Whole Lot of Nothing =

Studio album by Clawfinger
- Released: 23 July 2001
- Genre: Nu metal; rap metal; industrial metal
- Length: 48:08
- Label: Supersonic
- Producer: Jacob Hellner, Clawfinger

Clawfinger chronology
Clawfinger (1997)	A Whole Lot of Nothing (2001)	Zeros & Heroes (2003)

Singles from The Simulation
- 1. "Out to Get Me" Released: 2001; 2. "Nothing Going On" Released: 2001

Professional ratings
Review scores
Source	Rating
Rock Hard	7.5/10

A Whole Lot of Nothing is the fourth studio album by Swedish rap metal band Clawfinger, released on 23 July 2001 through Supersonic Records.

The music uses the same aggressive guitar sounds, with more distortion effects, adding a whole new level of diversification. The synthesizers are more present than on any of Clawfinger's other works.

It is the first Clawfinger album to be produced by Jacob Hellner since Use Your Brain 6 years earlier.

== Track listing ==
No.	Title	Length
1.	"Two Steps Away"	3:40
2.	"Out to Get Me"	3:43
3.	"Nothing Going On"	3:20
4.	"Are You Man Enough"	3:35
5.	"Confrontation"	3:33
6.	"Evolution"	4:17
7.	"Don't Look at Me"	3:32
8.	"Simon Says"	4:01
9.	"Burn in Hell"	3:23
10.	"I Close My Eyes"	3:09
11.	"Paradise"	3:39
12.	"Revenge"	4:02
13.	"Vienna" (Ultravox cover)	4:14
Total length:		48:08

Limited edition bonus tracks
No.	Title	Length
14.	"Manic Depression" (Jimi Hendrix cover)	3:18
15.	"Fake a Friend"	3:46
Total length:		55:12

== Credits ==
- Backing Vocals [Additional] – Henrik Batte Ohlsson (tracks: 6)
- Bass [Additional] – André Skaug
- Drums [Additional] – Henka Johansson, Ricard Nettermalm
- Engineer [Basic Tracking] – Ulf Kruckenberg
- Management – Petri H. Lundén
- Mastered By – Björn Engelmann
- Mixed By – Stefan Glaumann
- Music By, Lyrics By – Currie (tracks: 13), Allen (tracks: 13), Clawfinger (tracks: 1 to 12), Ure (tracks: 13), Cann (tracks: 13)
- Other [Booking] – Jim Morewood
- Other [Coordination] – Caroline Kugelberg
- Producer – Jacob Hellner
- Producer [With] – Clawfinger
