= Wigger =

White person who emulates Black culture

Wigger, also wigga, whigger and whigga, is a derogatory slang term for white people who emulate the mannerisms, language, and fashions that are generally stereotypically associated with African-American culture, particularly hip-hop/rap culture. The word is a portmanteau of "white nigger".

Dictionary.com defines the term as a slang derogatory reference to "a white youth who adopts black youth culture by adopting its speech, wearing its clothes, and listening to its music." Another dictionary defines the term as "offensive slang" referring to a "white person, usually a teenager or young adult who adopts the fashions, the tastes, and often the mannerisms considered typical of urban black youth."

The term is generally considered a derogatory term reflecting stereotypes of African-American, black British, and white culture (when used as a synonym of white trash). The wannabe connotation may be used pejoratively. Labeling someone a "wigger" is similar to and often considered the inverse of the term "acting-white", in which an African American is perceived by other African Americans to speak in a way, act in ways, and be interested in things stereotypically associated with White Americans. Both "Wigger" and "acting-white" are controversial, with some believing that these terms perpetuate racial stereotypes and are an attempt to limit a person to the stereotypes of their own race.

== Phenomenon ==
Bakari Kitwana, "a culture critic who's been tracking American hip hop for years", has written "Why White Kids Love Hip Hop: Wangstas, Wiggers, Wannabes, and the New Reality of Race in America". In 1993, an article in the UK newspaper The Independent described the phenomenon of white, middle-class children who were "wannabe blacks".

Robert A. Clift's documentary titled "Blacking Up: Hip-Hop's Remix of Race and Identity" questions white enthusiasts of black hip-hop culture. The term of art wigger "is used both proudly and derisively to describe white enthusiasts of black hip-hop culture". Clift's documentary examines "racial and cultural ownership and authenticity—a path that begins with the stolen blackness seen in the success of Stephen Foster, Al Jolson, Benny Goodman, Elvis Presley, the Rolling Stones—all the way up to Vanilla Ice (popular music's ur-wigger) and Eminem". A review of the documentary refers to the wiggers as "white poseurs".

In his book Colored White, historian David Roediger discusses the term "wigger" at length. He argues that it originated from multiple sources in both the black and white communities, and stresses its multiple meanings, as in this passage: "Where my older son went to junior high school, wigger was at the same time acceptingly applied by Blacks to whites, disparagingly applied by racist whites to other whites, dismissively applied by whites adopting Black styles to whites who were seen as doing so inauthentically, and used approvingly by white would-be-hiphoppers to describe each other".

In political writer Mark Satin's short story "My Revolution", a thief is described as a wigger by an elderly pawnshop owner. Outraged by multiple robberies, the owner installs an illegal nighttime security device, which electrocutes a young man breaking into the shop. From jail, the owner comments:

When I [first saw the dead body], I felt I was seeing a personification of the evil that's stalking this land – the dopey face frozen in an expression of rage and entitlement, the $300 tennis shoes, the long knife unbuttoned in its sheath, ready to strike, even the crack in the tukhus. And the no-goodnik was white, what they call on the street a "wigger." I never had anything like his shoes on Avenue N growing up. Why the hatred? Why the resentment? Why?

== Lawsuit ==
A 2011 class-action lawsuit in the United States District Court for Minnesota alleged that the administration at a predominantly white high school showed a "deliberate indifference" in allowing a group of students to hold a homecoming event called "Wigger Day" or "Wangsta Day" since at least 2008. A plaintiff named Quera Pruitt sought declaratory judgment and $75,000 in punitive damages from the defendants for creating a racially hostile environment. On July 24, 2012, the parties settled out of court with Pruitt being awarded $90,000.

== See also ==
- Blackface
- Acting white
- Chav
- Cultural cringe
- Multicultural London English
- Negermusik
- White nigger
- Negrophilia
- Nigger
- Race traitor
- Cultural appropriation § African American culture (including "blackfishing")
