= Use Your Brain =

Studio album by Clawfinger
- Released: 23 March 1995
- Genre: Rap metal
- Length: 44:30
- Labels: WEA; MVG
- Producers: Clawfinger; Jacob Hellner

Clawfinger chronology
Deaf Dumb Blind (1993)	Use Your Brain (1995)	Clawfinger (1997)

Singles from Use Your Brain
- 1. "Pin Me Down" Released: 1995; 2. "Do What I Say" Released: 1995; 3. "Tomorrow" Released: 1996

Professional ratings
Review scores
Source	Rating
AllMusic	2.5/5 stars
Kerrang!	3/5 stars
Rock Hard	9.5/10 stars

Use Your Brain is the second studio album by Swedish rap metal band Clawfinger, released on 23 March 1995 through MVG Records and Warner Music Group. The band reunited with producer Jacob Hellner for the recording of the album. Use Your Brain was written in less than two months and spawned three singles with accompanying videos. The album contains twelve tracks, with three bonus tracks being added to a 2004 re-release.

== Track listing ==
No.	Title	Length
1.	"Power"	3:14
2.	"Pay the Bill"	4:20
3.	"Pin Me Down"	4:10
4.	"Wipe My Ass" (listed as "Waste My Time" on some versions)	3:13
5.	"Die High"	2:34
6.	"It"	5:21
7.	"Do What I Say"	4:25
8.	"Undone" (featuring Freddie Wadling)	4:11
9.	"What Are You Afraid Of"	3:47
10.	"Back to the Basics"	2:27
11.	"Easy Way Out"	2:39
12.	"Tomorrow"	4:09
Total length:		44:30

Bonus tracks
No.	Title	Length
13.	"Better Than This"	3:36
14.	"Three Good Riffs"	3:56
15.	"Armageddon Down"	3:36

== Personnel ==
- Erlend Ottem – guitar, group member
- Andre Skaug – bass guitar
- Morten Skaug – drums
- Jocke Skog – keyboards, programming, backing vocals, group member
- Zak Tell – lead vocals, group member
- Bård Torstensen – guitar, backing vocals

=== Additional personnel ===
- Ricard Netterman – percussion
- Sleepy (Patrik Elofsson) – vocals
- Freddie Wadling - vocals "Undone"
- Engineered by Thomas Pettersson
- Mixed by Stefan Glaumann
- Producer by Clawfinger and Jacob Hellner

== Charts ==
=== Weekly charts ===
Weekly chart performance for Use Your Brain
Chart (1995)	Peak position
Austrian Albums (Ö3 Austria)	9
Belgian Albums (Ultratop Flanders)	15
Belgian Albums (Ultratop Wallonia)	19
Dutch Albums (Album Top 100)	87
European Albums (European Top 100 Albums)	14
German Albums (Offizielle Top 100)	8
Hungarian Albums (MAHASZ)	32
Norwegian Albums (VG-lista)	14
Swedish Albums (Sverigetopplistan)	7
Swiss Albums (Schweizer Hitparade)	6
UK Albums (Official Charts)	80

=== Year-end charts ===
1995 year-end chart performance for Use Your Brain
Chart (1995)	Position
Austrian Albums (Ö3 Austria)	42
Belgian Albums (Ultratop Flanders)	91
European Albums (European Top 100 Albums)	90
German Albums (Offizielle Top 100)	33
Swiss Albums (Schweizer Hitparade)	36
