= Clawfinger (album) =

Studio album by Clawfinger
- Released: 29 September 1997
- Genre: Rap metal; nu metal
- Length: 43:32
- Label: WEA; MVG
- Producer: Clawfinger; Peter Reardon

Clawfinger chronology
Use Your Brain (1995)	Clawfinger (1997)	A Whole Lot of Nothing (2001)

Singles from Clawfinger
- 1. "Biggest & the Best" Released: 1997; 2. "Two Sides" Released: 1998; 3. "Don't Wake Me Up" Released: 1998

Professional ratings
Review scores
Source	Rating
AllMusic	2.5/5 stars

Clawfinger is the third studio album by Swedish rap metal band Clawfinger, released on 29 September 1997 through WEA and MVG labels.

== Background ==
The first song on the album is "Two Sides", which expanded the band's reach by using female choir vocals and a Middle Eastern sound. The rest of the album continues with the band's typical aggressive voice and socio-political lyrics.

Clawfinger contains twelve songs with an additional three bonus tracks on the limited edition. Three singles were released (detailed below) and two videos ("Biggest & the Best" and "Two Sides").

The album was named after the band because the band members could not agree on a title. Zak Tell said in interviews that upon seeing the printed sleeve (when it was too late) he had the title idea "Third Time Lucky" and wished he had thought of it in time. This title was relevant as the cover depicts a revolver's cylinder with a single bullet that would be fired on pulling the trigger for the third time, as well as the album being the band's third album.

== Track listing ==
All tracks by Clawfinger.

No.	Title	Length
1.	"Two Sides"	4:05
2.	"Hold Your Head Up"	3:26
3.	"Biggest & the Best"	3:51
4.	"Chances"	2:58
5.	"Don't Wake Me Up"	4:10
6.	"Not Even You"	2:46
7.	"Nobody Knows"	3:12
8.	"I Can See Them Coming"	3:39
9.	"Wrong State of Mind"	3:51
10.	"I'm Your Life & Religion"	3:56
11.	"Crazy"	2:47
12.	"I Guess I'll Never Know"	4:51

Bonus tracks
No.	Title	Length
13.	"RealiTV"	3:46
14.	"Runnerboy"	3:36
15.	"What Gives Us the Right"	3:36

== Personnel ==
- Tom Baker – mastering
- Clawfinger – producer
- Flesh Quartet – strings
- Alexander Kurlandsky – photography
- Adam Kviman – engineer
- Richard Mouser – guitar, engineer
- Sebastian Oberg – cello
- Erlend Ottem – guitar
- Peter Reardon – sound effects, vocals, multi instruments, producer
- Andre Skaug – bass guitar, water sticks
- Jocke Skog – bass guitar, guitar, keyboards, programming, backing vocals, mixing
- Zak Tell – vocals
- Bård Torstensen – guitar, piano, programming, sitar, backing vocals, tamboura
- Antoinette Sayegh – backing vocals on "Two Sides"

== Charts ==
=== Weekly charts ===
Chart (1997)	Peak position
Hungarian Albums (MAHASZ)	40
