= Florentinus =

Florentinus may refer to:

- Lucius Aninius Sextius Florentinus (died between 127 and 130), Roman senator
- Florentinus, jurist mentioned as one of the council of the emperor Severus Alexander
- Florentinus (prefect), prefect of Rome in 397
- Florentinus, 6th-century poet
- Florentinus, one of the three Christian martyrs Modestinus, Florentinus and Flavianus
- Florentinus male given name notably borne by
  - Hieronymus Florentinus Quehl (1694–1739), German composer
  - Florentinus de Valentia, pseudonym of Daniel Mögling (1596–1635)
  - Florentinus Gregorius Winarno
  - Florentinus Sului Hajang Hau

== See also ==
- Florentina
- Florentino
- Florentin
- Florentine
