= Florent (disambiguation) =

Florent is a personal name. It may also refer to:

- Florent (restaurant), former diner in New York City
- Florent-en-Argonne, commune in France

== See also ==
- Florentin
- Florentine
- Saint-Florent, Haute-Corse
