= Bugonia =

Practice of the ancient Mediterranean

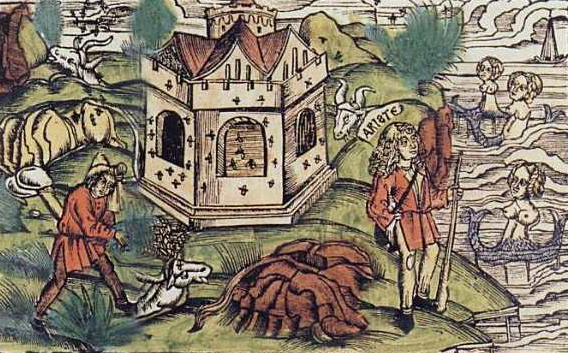
Aristeas and bugonia. Virgil's Georgics. Lyon. 1517

Bugonia (/bjuːˈɡoʊniə/; Ancient Greek: βουγονία bougoníā) was a folk practice in the ancient Mediterranean region based on the belief that bees were spontaneously generated from a cow's carcass. By extension, it was thought that fumigation with cow dung was beneficial to the health of the hive.

It is possible that bugonia had more currency as a poetic and learned trope than as an actual practice. The process is described by Virgil in the fourth book of the Georgics. Multiple other writers mention the practice.

A detailed description of bugonia is found in the Byzantine Geoponica:

Build a house, ten cubits high, with all the sides of equal dimensions, with one door, and four windows, one on each side; put an ox into it, thirty months old, very fat and fleshy; let a number of young men kill him by beating him violently with clubs, so as to mangle both flesh and bones, but taking care not to shed any blood; let all the orifices, mouth, eyes, nose etc. be stopped up with clean and fine linen, impregnated with pitch; let a quantity of thyme be strewed under the reclining animal, and then let windows and doors be closed and covered with a thick coating of clay, to prevent the access of air or wind. After three weeks have passed, let the house be opened, and let light and fresh air get access to it, except from the side from which the wind blows strongest. Eleven days afterwards, you will find the house full of bees, hanging together in clusters, and nothing left of the ox but horns, bones and hair.

The myth of Aristaeus was an archetype of this practice, serving to instruct bee keepers on how to recover from the loss of their bees.

== Etymology ==
The Greek βουγονία (bougoníā) comes from βοῦς (boûs), meaning 'ox', and γονή (gonḗ), meaning 'progeny'. Furthermore, Greek βουγενής μέλισσαι (bougenḗs mélissai) and Latin taurigenae apes meant 'ox-born bees', and the ancients would sometimes simply call honey bees βουγενής ('ox-born') or taurigenae ('bull-born').

== Origin ==
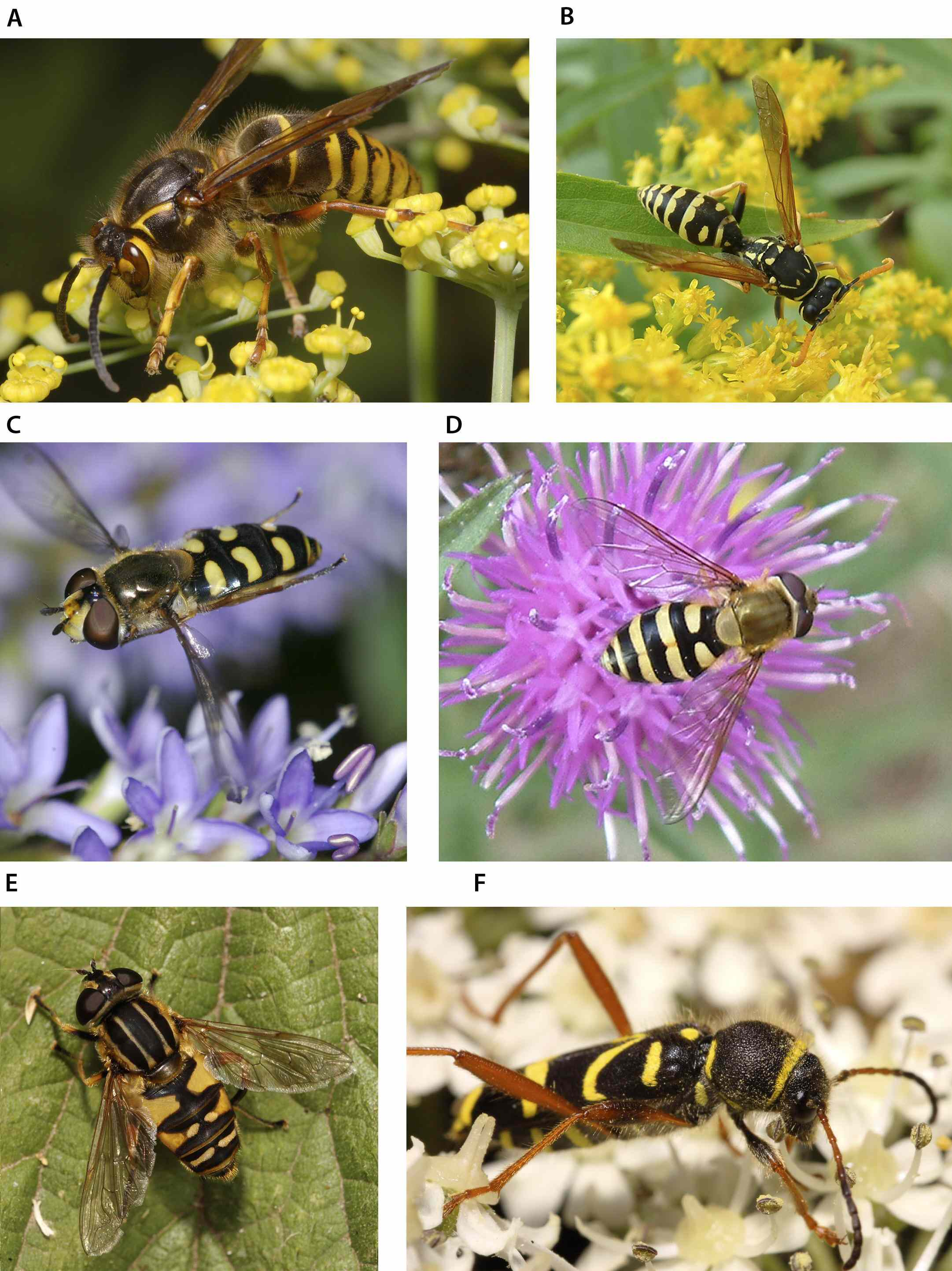
Bee and wasp mimics are diverse.

One explanation claims that any of the Batesian mimics of bees with scavenger larvae were mistaken for bees ("footless at first, anon with feet and wings"). More specifically, the hoverfly Eristalis tenax has received particular attention. While not providing honey, these flies would have been productive pollinators.

Others argue that beekeepers would have understood that flies do not produce honey and give the explanation that Apis mellifera (western honey bee) resorts to any cavity, and in particular cavities of trees and rocks, but also in skulls and in thoracic cavities of large animal carcasses in which to construct a nest. There is one, possibly apocryphal, attestation of actual usage of a man's skull by wasps.

== Ancient attestation ==
Perhaps the earliest mention is by Nicander of Colophon.

Bugonia is described twice in the second half of Virgil's Georgics and frames the Aristaeus epyllion in the second half. The first description, opening the second half of the fourth book, describes a typical form of the practice, followed by the tale of Aristaeus, who after losing his bees, descends to the home of his mother, the nymph Cyrene, where he is given instructions on how to restore his colonies. He must capture the sea god Proteus and force him to reveal which divine spirit he angered such that his bees died. Proteus changes into multiple forms but is bound at last and recounts how Aristaeus caused the death of Eurydice, thus angering the nymphs.

The practice, or ritual, demanded of Aristaeus by Cyrene upon his return is markedly different from the first description: He is to sacrifice four bulls, four heifers, a black sheep and a calf in an open glen. This version of bugonia served as the climax of a large work, and thus may be based more on the traditional Roman sacrificial rites than bugonia itself, in order to close the Georgics in a more symbolically appropriate way. Thus the former version can reflect man's relation to the gods in the Golden Age and the latter the current relation.

Quoting Ovid's Metamorphoses (XV.361–68), Florentinus of the Geoponica reports the process as a proven and obvious fact:

If any further evidence is necessary to enhance the faith in things already proved, you may behold that carcases, decaying from the effect of time and tepid moisture, change into small animals. Go, and bury slaughtered oxen – the fact is known from experience – the rotten entrails produce flower-sucking bees, who, like their parents, roam over pastures, bent upon work, and hopeful of the future. A buried warhorse produces the hornet.

Different variations are attested, such as simply burying the cow, or covering the corpse with mud or dung. Archelaus calls bees the "factitious progeny of a decaying ox". One variation states that use of the rumen alone is sufficient. According to the ancient Greek writer Antigonus of Carystus, in Egypt the ox would be buried with its horns projecting above the surface of the ground, and when severed, bees would emerge from the base of the horns.

Pietro de' Crescenzi refers to Bugonia circa 1304. In 1475, Konrad of Megenberg, in the first German book of natural history, cites Michel von Schottenlant and Virgil, claiming that the bees are born from the skin and the stomach of an ox. Michael Herren gives a detailed description of bugonia drawn from Geoponica. Johannes Colerus whose book constituted the book of reference for multiple generations of apiarists expresses the same belief in bugonia. The method appears even in European apiculture books of the 1700s.

=== Variations ===
The idea that hornets or wasps are born of the corpses of horses (hippogonia) was often described alongside bugonia. Given that European hornets and wasps bear a resemblance to European bees, it may be possible that the folk practice arose out of a misreported or misunderstood observation of a natural event.

In the Hermetic Cyranides it is reported that worms are born after one week and bees after three weeks.

=== Ancient scepticism ===
Pre-dating Nicander by a century, Aristotle never mentions bugonia and dismisses bees being born from animals other than their own kind. Furthermore, he is able to distinguish the castes of drone, worker, and queen (which he calls "king"), so he would certainly have been able to distinguish bees from their mimics. Later authors mention bugonia in commentaries on Aristotle's Physics. Celsus and Columella are recorded as having opposed the practice.

== In Judaism ==
In the Book of Judges, a story is told of Samson finding a swarm of bees in a lion's carcass. Samson later recounts this in the form of a riddle: "Out of the strong came forth sweetness." The biblical story is not thought to reference Greco-Roman bugonia but it was later used to support the veracity of bugonia.

The Hellenistic Jewish philosopher Philo offers bugonia as a possible reason why honey is forbidden as a sacrifice to Yahweh:

Moreover, it also ordains that every sacrifice shall be offered up without any leaven or honey, not thinking it fit that either of these things should be brought to the altar. The honey, perhaps, because the bee which collects it is not a clean animal, inasmuch as it derives its birth, as the story goes, from the putrefaction and corruption of dead oxen.

== See also ==
- Aristaeus
- Bee (mythology)
- Bull (mythology)
- Bucranium
- Georgics
- Bugonia (2025), an American dark comedy film
