= Georgics =

Poem by Virgil

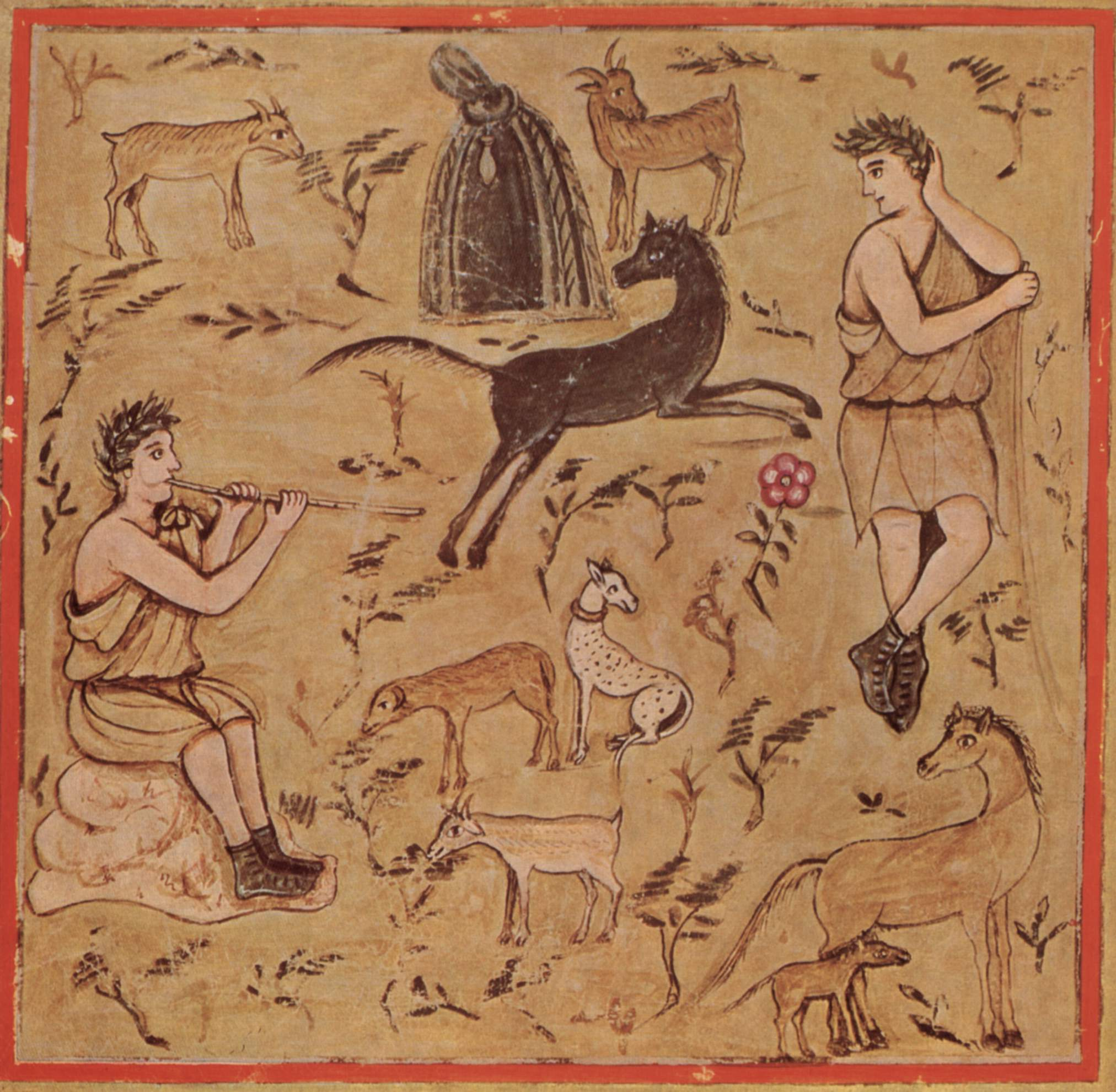
Georgics Book III, shepherd with flocks, Roman Virgil.

The Georgics (/ˈdʒɔːrdʒɪks/ JOR-jiks; Latin: Georgica [ɡeˈoːrɡɪka]) is a poem by Latin poet Virgil, likely published in 29 BCE. As the name suggests (from the Greek word γεωργικά, geōrgiká, i.e. "agricultural [things]"), the subject of the poem is agriculture; but far from being an example of peaceful rural poetry, it is a work characterized by tensions in both theme and purpose.

The Georgics is considered Virgil's second major work, following his Eclogues and preceding the Aeneid. The poem draws on a variety of prior sources and has influenced many later authors from antiquity to the present.

== Description and summary ==
The work consists of 2,188 hexametric verses divided into four books. The yearly timings by the rising and setting of particular stars were valid for the precession epoch of Virgil's time, and so are not always valid now.

=== Book One ===
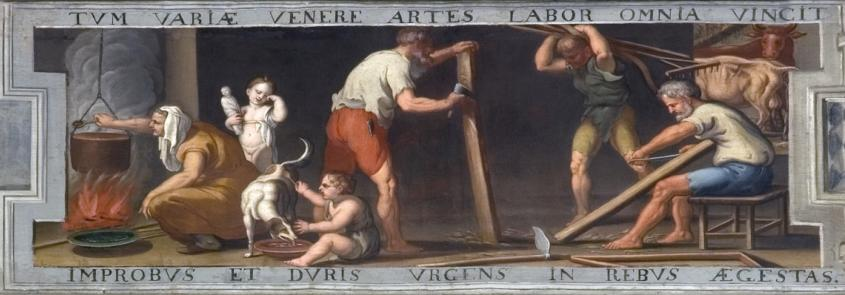
One of four Polish frieze paintings in the King's palace at Wilanów illustrating Georgics Book I, 1683

Virgil begins his poem with a dedication to Maecenas, then a summary of the four books, followed by a prayer to various agricultural deities as well as Augustus himself. It takes as its model the work on farming by Varro, but differs from it in important ways. Numerous technical passages fill out the initial half of the first book; of particular interest are lines 160–175, where Virgil describes the plow. In the succession of ages, whose model is ultimately Hesiod, the age of Jupiter and its relation to the golden age and the current age of man are crafted with deliberate tension. Of chief importance is the contribution of labour to the success or failure of mankind's endeavours, agricultural or otherwise. The book comes to one climax with the description of a great storm in lines 311–350, which brings all of man's efforts to nothing. After detailing various weather-signs, Virgil ends with an enumeration of the portents associated with Caesar's assassination and civil war; only Octavian offers any hope of salvation.

=== Book Two ===
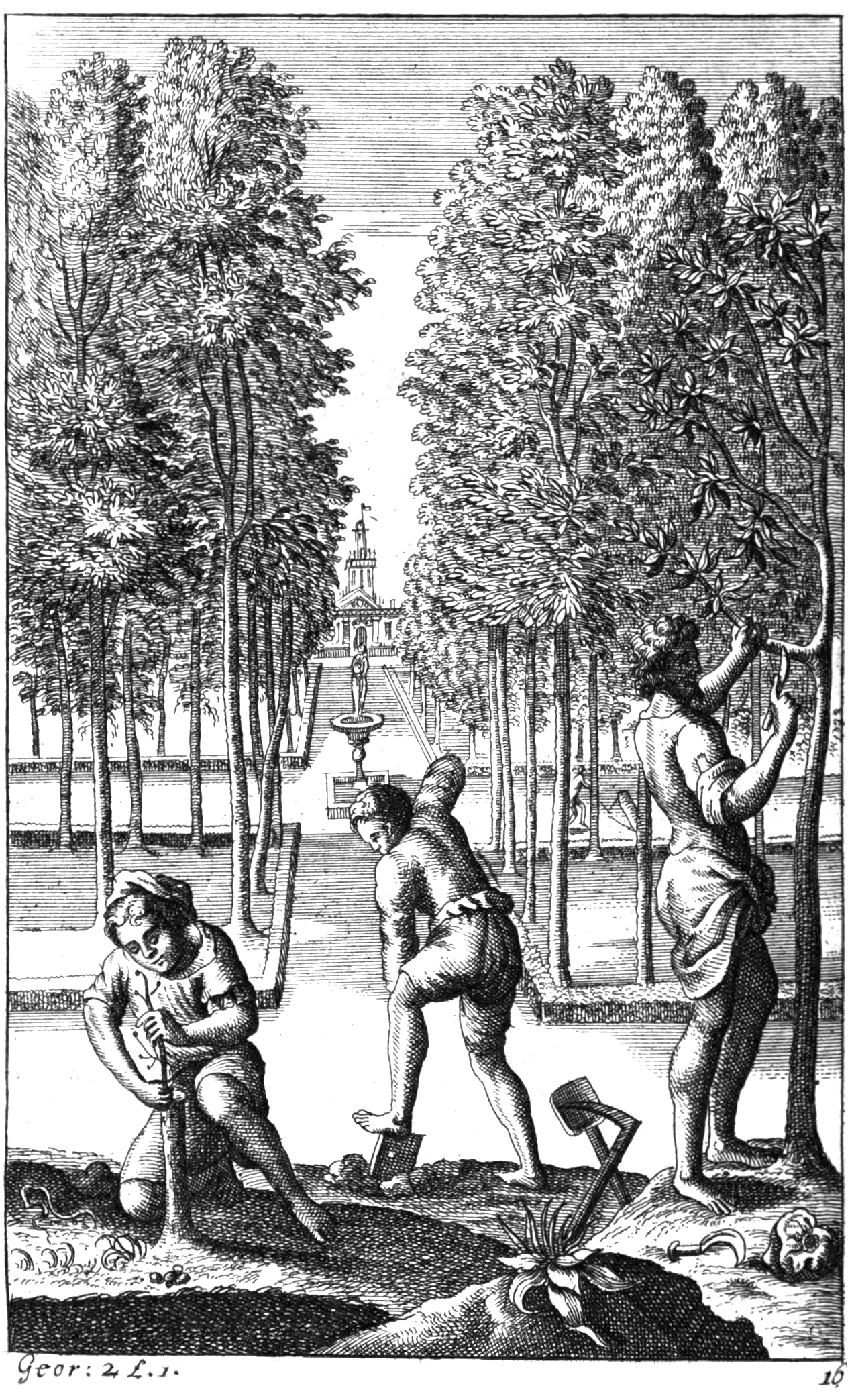
Georgics Book II, line 1: "Thus far of tillage, and of heav'nly signs", from The Works of Virgil translated by John Dryden (1709)

Prominent themes of the second book include agriculture as man's struggle against a hostile natural world, often described in violent terms, and the ages of Saturn and Jupiter. Like the first book, it begins with a poem addressing the divinities associated with the matters about to be discussed: viticulture, trees, and the olive. In the next hundred lines, Virgil treats forest and fruit trees. Their propagation and growth are described in detail, with a contrast drawn between methods that are natural and those that require human intervention. Three sections on grafting are of particular interest: presented as marvels of man's alteration of nature. Also included is a catalogue of the world's trees, set forth in rapid succession, and other products of various lands. Perhaps the most famous passage of the poem, the Laudes Italiae, or Praises of Italy, is introduced by way of a comparison with foreign marvels: despite all of those, no land is as praiseworthy as Italy. A point of cultural interest is a reference to Ascra in line 176, which an ancient reader would have known as the hometown of Hesiod. Next comes the care of vines, culminating in a vivid scene of their destruction by fire; then advice on when to plant vines, and therein the other famous passage of the second book, the Praises of Spring. These depict the growth and beauty that accompany spring's arrival. The poet then returns to didactic narrative with yet more on vines, emphasizing their fragility and laboriousness. A warning about animal damage provides occasion for an explanation of why goats are sacrificed to Bacchus. The olive tree is then presented in contrast to the vine: it requires little effort on the part of the farmer. The next subject, at last turning away from the vine, is other kinds of trees: those that produce fruit and those that have useful wood. Then Virgil again returns to grapevines, recalling the myth of the battle of the Lapiths and Centaurs in a passage known as the Vituperation of Vines. The remainder of the book is devoted to extolling the simple country life over the corruptness of the city.

=== Book Three ===
The third book is chiefly and ostensibly concerned with animal husbandry. It consists of two principal parts, the first half is devoted to the selection of breed stock and the breeding of horses and cattle. It concludes with a description of the furore induced in all animals by sexual desire. The second half of the book is devoted to the care and protection of sheep and goats and their by-products. It concludes with a description of the havoc and devastation caused by a plague in Noricum. Both halves begin with a short prologue called a proem. The poems invoke Greek and Italian gods and address such issues as Virgil's intention to honour both Caesar and his patron Maecenas, as well as his lofty poetic aspirations and the difficulty of the material to follow. Many have observed the parallels between the dramatic endings of each half of this book and the irresistible power of their respective themes of love and death.

=== Book Four ===
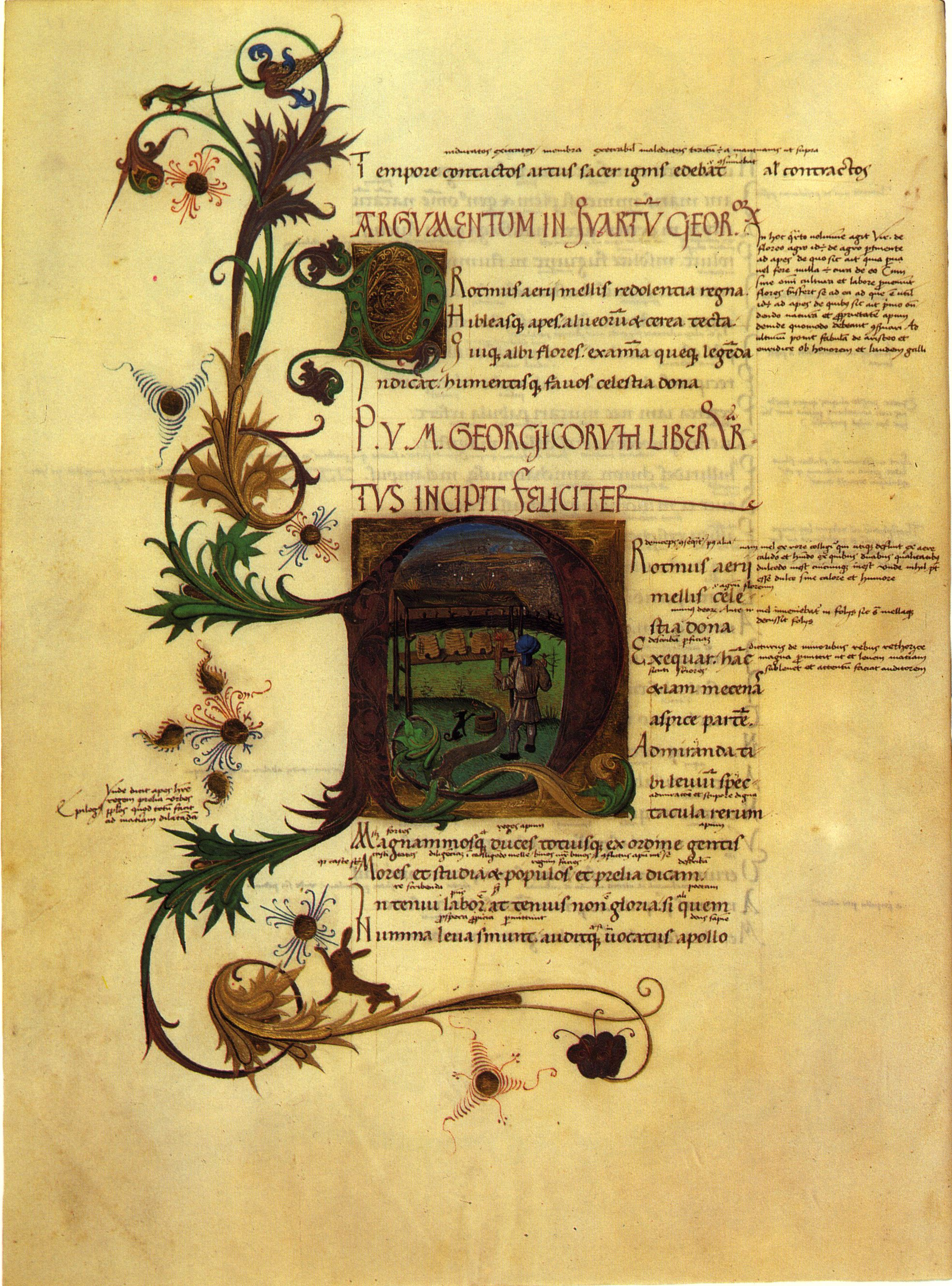
Fourth book of Virgil's Georgics in ms. Biblioteca Apostolica Vaticana, Vaticanus Palatinus lat. 1632, fol. 51v.

Book four, a tonal counterpart to book two, is divided approximately in half; the first half (1–280) is didactic and deals with the life and habits of bees, as a model for human society. Bees resemble man in that their labour is devoted to a king and they give their lives for the sake of the community, but they lack the arts and love. In spite of their labour, the bees perish and the entire colony dies. The restoration of the bees is accomplished by bugonia, spontaneous rebirth from the carcass of an ox. This process is described twice in the second half (281–568) and frames the Aristaeus epyllion beginning at line 315. The tone of the book changes from didactic to epic and elegiac in this epyllion, which contains within it the story of Orpheus and Eurydice. Aristaeus, after losing his bees, descends to the home of his mother, the nymph Cyrene, where he is given instructions on how to restore his colonies. He must capture the seer Proteus and force him to reveal which divine spirit he angered and how to restore his bee colonies. After binding Proteus (who changes into many forms to no avail), Aristaeus is told by the seer that he angered the nymphs by causing the death of the nymph Eurydice, wife of Orpheus. Proteus describes the descent of Orpheus into the underworld to retrieve Eurydice, the backward look that caused her return to Tartarus, and at last Orpheus' death at the hands of the Ciconian women. Book four concludes with an eight-line sphragis, or seal, in which Virgil contrasts his life of poetry with that of Octavian the general.

== Sources ==
=== Greek ===
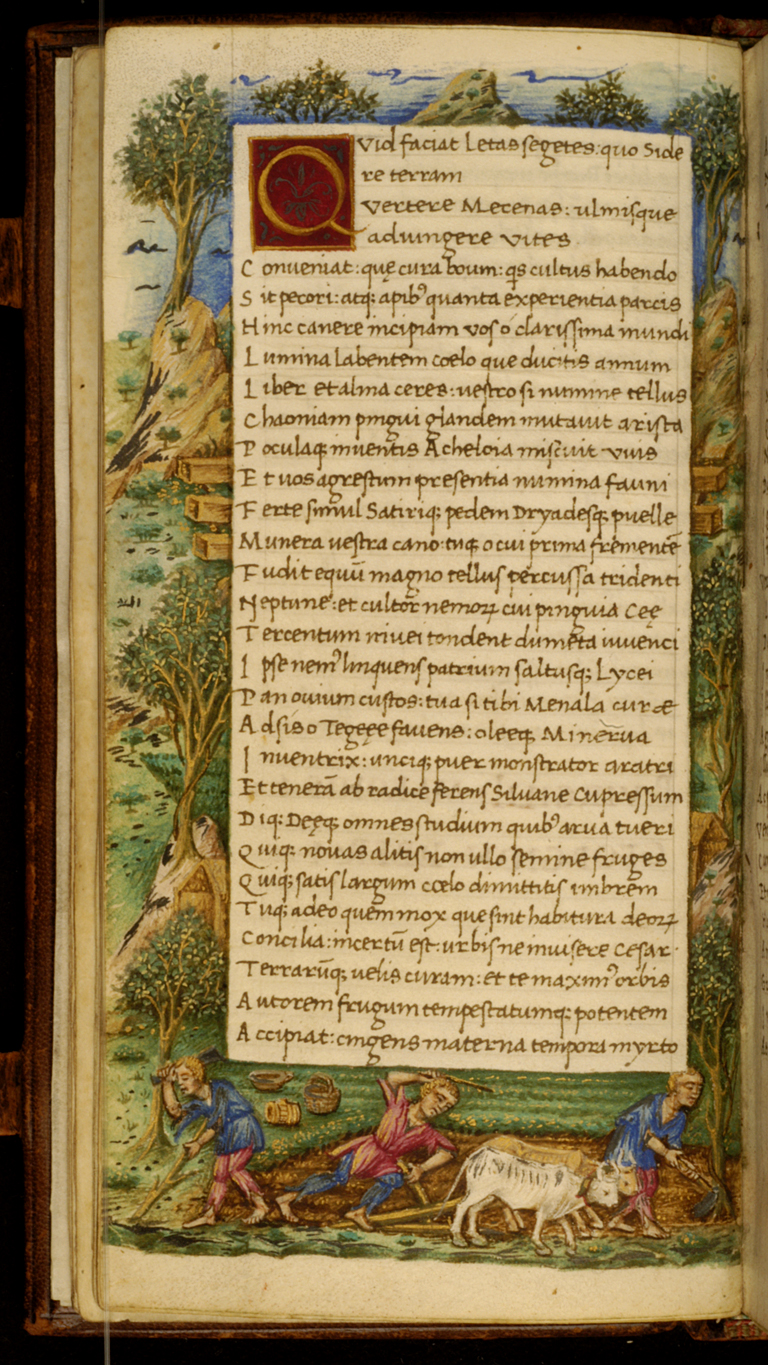
Cristoforo Majorana – Leaf from Eclogues, Georgics and Aeneid – Walters W40016V – Open Reverse

Virgil's model for composing a didactic poem in hexameters is the archaic Greek poet Hesiod, whose poem Works and Days shares with the Georgics the themes of man's relationship to the land and the importance of hard work. The Hellenistic poet Nicander's lost Georgics may also be an important influence. Virgil used other Greek writers as models and sources, some for technical information, including the Hellenistic poet Aratus for astronomy and meteorology, Nicander for information about snakes, the philosopher Aristotle for zoology, and Aristotle's student Theophrastus for botany, and others, such as the Hellenistic poet Callimachus for poetic and stylistic considerations. The Greek literary tradition from Homer on also serves as an important source for Virgil's use of mythological detail and digression.

=== Roman ===
Lucretius' De rerum natura serves as Virgil's primary Latin model in terms of genre and meter. Many passages from Virgil's poetry are indebted to Lucretius: the plague section of the third book takes as its model the plague of Athens that closes the De rerum natura. Virgil is also indebted to Ennius, who, along with Lucretius, naturalized hexameter verse in Latin. Virgil often uses language characteristic of Ennius to give his poetry an archaic quality. The intriguing idea has been put forth by one scholar that Virgil also drew on the rustic songs and speech patterns of Italy at certain points in his poem, to give portions of the work a distinct, Italian character. Virgil draws on the neoteric poets at times, and Catullus' Carmen 64 very likely had a large impact on the epyllion of Aristaeus that ends the Georgics 4. Virgil's extensive knowledge and skilful integration of his models is central to the success of different portions of the work and the poem as a whole.

== Cultural contexts ==
=== Philosophical context ===
The two predominant philosophical schools in Rome during Virgil's lifetime were Stoicism and Epicureanism. Of these two, the Epicurean strain is predominant not only in the Georgics but also in Virgil's social and intellectual milieu. Varius Rufus, a close friend of Virgil and the man who published the Aeneid after Virgil's death, had Epicurean tastes, as did Horace and his patron Maecenas.

The philosophical text with the greatest influence on the Georgics as a whole was Lucretius' Epicurean epic De rerum natura. G. B. Conte notes, citing the programmatic statement "Felix, qui potuit rerum cognoscere causas" in Georgics 2.490–502, which draws from De rerum natura 1.78–9, "the basic impulse for the Georgics came from a dialogue with Lucretius." Likewise, David West remarks in his discussion of the plague in the third book, Virgil is "saturated with the poetry of Lucretius, and its words, phrases, thought and rhythms have merged in his mind, and become transmuted into an original work of poetic art."

=== Political context ===
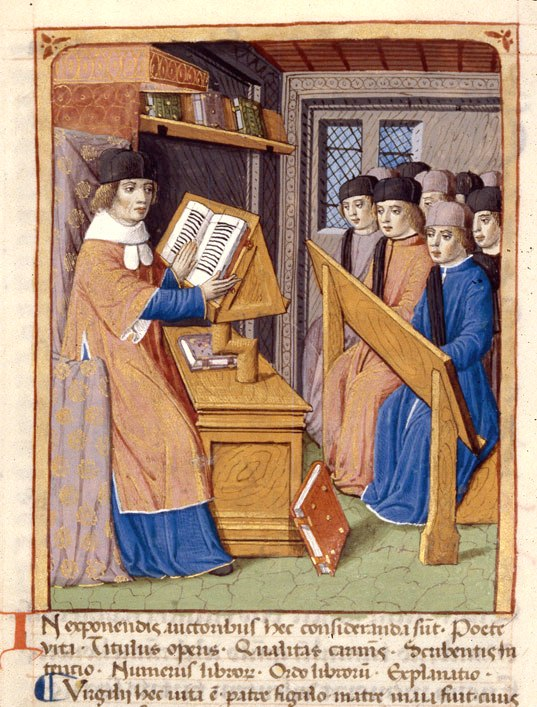
Virgil teaching, a miniature from a 15th-century French manuscript of the Georgics

Beginning with Caesar's assassination in 44 BCE and ending with Octavian's victory over Anthony and Cleopatra at Actium in 31 BCE, Rome had been engaged in a series of almost constant civil wars. After almost 15 years of political and social upheaval, Octavian, the sole surviving member of the Second Triumvirate, became firmly established as the new leader of the Roman world. Under Octavian, Rome enjoyed a long period of relative peace and prosperity. However, Octavian's victory at Actium also sounded the death knell of the Republic. With Octavian as the sole ruler of the Roman world, the Roman Empire was born.

It was during this period, and against this backdrop of civil war, that Virgil composed the Georgics. While not containing any overtly political passages, politics are not absent from the Georgics. Not only is Octavian addressed in the poem both directly and indirectly, but the poem also contains several passages that include references and images that could be interpreted as political, such as the description of the plague in Book 3 and Virgil's famous description of bee society in Book 4. It is impossible to know whether or not these references and images were intended to be seen as political in nature, but it would not be inconceivable that Virgil was in some way influenced by the years of civil war. Whether they were intentional or not, if we believe Suetonius, these references did not seem to trouble Octavian, to whom Virgil is said to have recited the Georgics in 29 BCE.

=== Laudes Galli ===
A comment by the Virgilian commentator Servius, that the middle to the end of the fourth book contained a large series of praises for Cornelius Gallus (laudes Galli means "praises of Gallus" in Latin), has spurred much scholarly debate. Servius tells us that after Gallus had fallen out of favour, Virgil replaced the praises of Gallus with the Orpheus episode. Those supporting Servius see the Orpheus episode as an unpolished, weak episode, and point out that it is unlike anything else in the Georgics in that it radically departs from the didactic mode that we see throughout, rendering it an illogical, awkward insertion. Indeed, the features of the episode are unique; it is an epyllion that engages mythological material. The episode does not further the narrative and has no immediately apparent relevance to Virgil's topic. The difficult, open-ended conclusion seems to confirm this interpretation.

In a highly influential article Anderson debunked this view, and it is now generally believed that there were not Laudes Galli and that the Orpheus episode is original. Generally, arguments against the view above question Servius' reliability, citing the possibility that he confused the end of the Georgics with the end of the Eclogues, which does make mention of Gallus. Further, they question its validity based on chronological evidence: the Georgics would have been finished a number of years before the disgrace and suicide of Gallus, and so one would expect more evidence of an alternative version of the end of the poem—or at least more sources mentioning it. Instead, the Orpheus episode is here understood as an integral part of the poem that articulates or encapsulates its ethos by reinforcing many ideas or reintroducing and problematizing tensions voiced throughout the text. The range of scholarship and interpretations offered is vast, and the arguments range from optimistic or pessimistic readings of the poem to notions of labour, Epicureanism, and the relationship between man and nature.

== Repetitions in the Aeneid ==
Within Virgil's later epic work the Aeneid, there are some 51 lines that are recycled, either whole or in part, from the Georgics. There is some debate whether these repetitions are (1) intrusions within the text of later scribes and editors, (2) indications pointing toward the level of incompleteness of the Aeneid, or (3) deliberate repetitions made by the poet, pointing toward meaningful areas of contact between the two poems. As a careful study by Ward Briggs goes a long way to show, the repetition of lines in the Georgics and the Aeneid is probably an intentional move made by Virgil, a poet given to a highly allusive style, not, evidently, to the exclusion of his own previous writings. Indeed, Virgil incorporates full lines in the Georgics of his earliest work, the Eclogues, although the number of repetitions is much smaller (only eight) and it does not appear that any one line was reduplicated in all three of his works.

The repetitions of material from the Georgics in the Aeneid vary in their length and degree of alteration. Some of the less exact, single-line reduplications may very well show a nodding Virgil or scribal interpolation. The extended repetitions, however, show some interesting patterns. In about half the cases, technical, agrarian descriptions are adapted into epic similes. This is fitting, as the stuff of many epic similes is rooted in the natural and domestic worlds from which epic heroes are cut off. Virgil shows his technical expertise by recontextualising identical lines to produce meanings that are different or inverted from their initial meaning in the Georgics. Additionally, some of these reproduced lines are themselves adapted from works by Virgil's earlier literary models, including Homer's Iliad and Odyssey, Apollonius of Rhodes' Argonautica, Ennius' Annals, and Lucretius' On the Nature of Things. With a single line or two, Virgil links (or distances), expands (or collapses) themes of various texts treating various subjects to create an Aeneid that is richly intertextual.

== Reception and influence ==
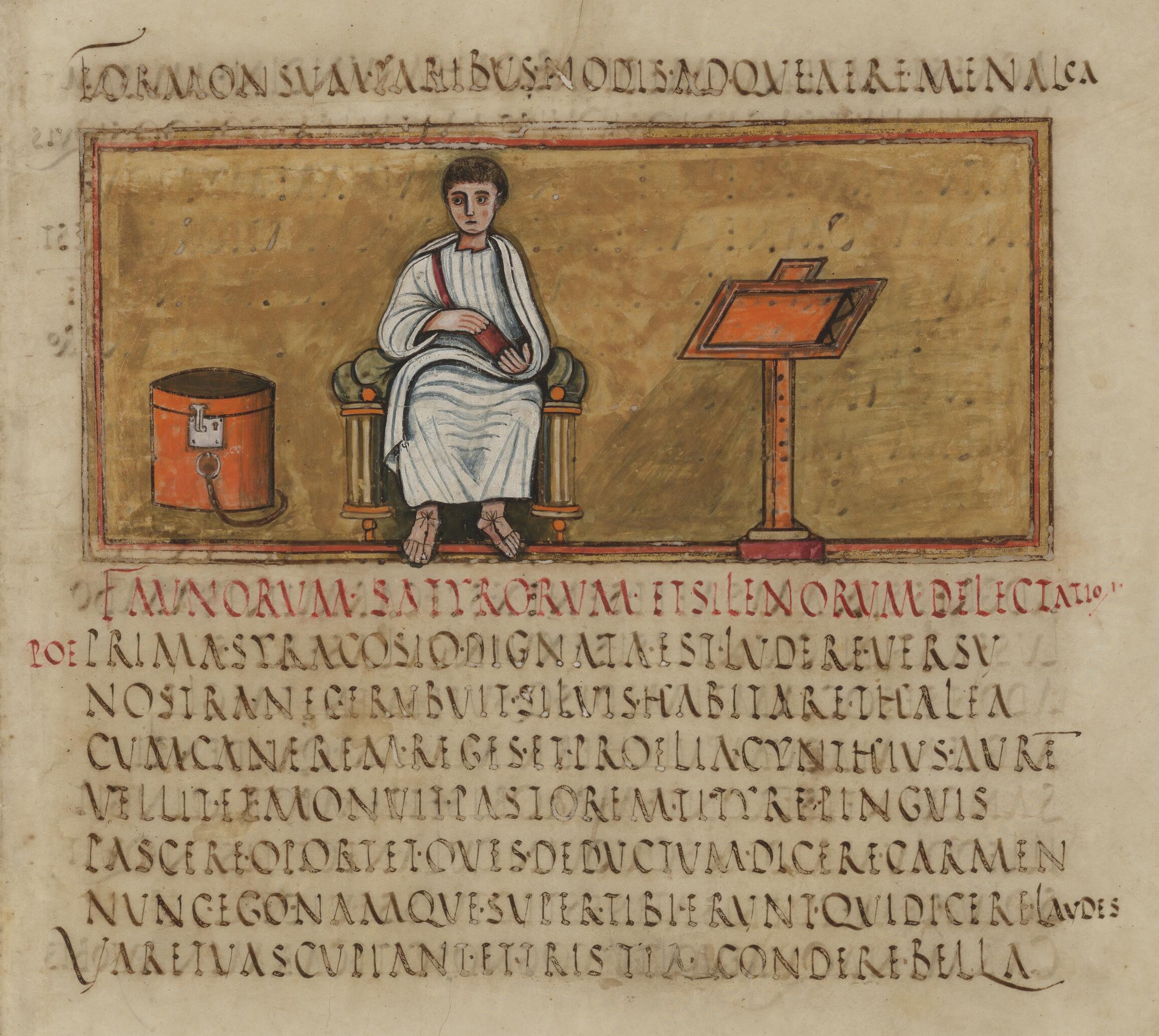
Author portrait of Virgil, Vergilius Romanus Folio 14

=== Reception in antiquity ===
The work on Georgics was launched when agriculture had become a science and Varro had already published his Res rusticae, on which Virgil relied as a source—a fact already recognized by the commentator Servius. Virgil's scholarship on his predecessors produced an extensive literary reaction by the following generations of authors. Seneca's comment that "Virgil ... aimed, not to teach the farmer, but to please the reader," underlines that Virgil's work was now esteemed more for its literary than its didactic qualities. (Seneca, Moral Letter 86.15)

=== Reception in the 18th century ===
John Dryden's 1697 poetic translation of Virgil's Georgics sparked a renewed interest in agricultural poetry and country life amongst the more educated classes during the 18th century. In the same year, the young Joseph Addison published his "Essay on Virgil's Georgics". In his eyes Virgil's poem seemed the principal model for this genre, which he defined as "some part of the science of husbandry, put into a pleasing dress and set off with all the beauties and embellishments of poetry". In the context of the 18th century, however, interest in the georgic, or the choice of it as a model for independent works, was "profoundly political", recognising an affinity with Virgil's treatment of rural subjects after the social and political disruptions through which he had lived. The tone of Virgil's work represented a longing for the "creation of order out of disorder" to which the Roman Augustan age succeeded, much as the British Augustan Age emerged from the social ferment and civil strife of the 17th century. The cultured of a later age were quick to see the parallel, but there was also an altered emphasis. Whereas for Virgil there was an antithesis between town life and country simplicity, in the view of the gentry of the 18th century, city and country were interdependent. Those who created specialised georgics of their own considered the commodities about which they wrote as items of trade that contributed to both local and national prosperity. For Roman citizens, farming was carried out in the service of the capital; for Britons the empire was consolidated as the result of mercantile enterprise and such commodities contributed to the general benefit.

A critic has pointed out that "the British Library holds no fewer than twenty translations of the Georgics from [the 18th century] period; of these, eight are separately published translations of the Georgics alone. Several of these translations, such as Dryden's, were reprinted regularly throughout the century. Also noteworthy is the fact that the brisk rate of new translations continued into the early decades of the nineteenth century, with 1808 as a kind of annus mirabilis, when three new versions appeared." Some among these, like Dryden's and the Earl of Lauderdale's (1709), had primarily poetic aims. Other translators were clergymen amateurs (Thomas Nevile, Cambridge 1767) or, translating into prose, had school use in mind (Joseph Davidson, London 1743). William Sotheby went on to place his acclaimed literary version of 1800 in the context of others across Europe when he reissued it in the sumptuous folio edition Georgica Publii Virgilii Maronis Hexaglotta (London, 1827). There it was accompanied by versions in Italian by Gian-Francesco Soave (1765), in Spanish by Juan de Guzmán (1768), in French by Jacques Delille (1769), and in German by Johann Heinrich Voss (1789).

Dutch influence on English farming also paved a way for the poem's rebirth, since Roman farming practices still prevailed in the Netherlands and were sustained there by Joost van den Vondel's prose translation of the Georgics into Dutch (1646). English farmers too attempted to imitate what they thought were genuine Virgilian agricultural techniques. In 1724 the poet William Benson wrote, "There is more of Virgil's husbandry in England at this instant than in Italy itself." Among those translators who aimed to establish Virgil's up-to-date farming credentials was James Hamilton, whose prose translation of Virgil's work was "published with such notes and reflexions as make him appear to have wrote like an excellent Farmer" (Edinburgh, 1742). This aspiration was supported by the assertion that, to make a proper translation, agricultural experience was a prerequisite—and for the lack of which, in the view of William Benson, Dryden's version was disqualified. That Robert Hoblyn had practical experience as a farmer was a qualification he considered the guarantee of his 1825 blank verse translation of the first book of the Georgics; and even in modern times it was made a commendation of Peter Fallon's 2004 version that he is "both a poet and a farmer, uniquely suited to translating this poem". However, Hoblyn could only support his stance at this date by interpolation and special pleading. Throughout Europe, Virgilian-style farming manuals were giving way to the agricultural revolution and their use was supplanted by scientific data, technical graphs and statistics.

=== Contemporary readings ===
The overtly political element in Virgil's poem attracted some translators, who applied it to their own local circumstances. The translation of the Georgics into Ancient Greek by Eugenios Voulgaris was published from St Petersburg in 1786 and had as one aim the support of Russia’s assimilation of the newly annexed Crimea by encouraging Greek settlement there. Virgil’s theme of taming the wilderness was further underlined in an introductory poem praising Grigory Potemkin as a philhellene Maecenas and the Empress Catherine the Great as the wise ruler directing the new territory's welfare. The inference is also there that Voulgaris himself (now archbishop of Novorossiya and Azov) has become thus the imperial Virgil.

In Britain there was a tendency to grant Virgil honorary citizenship. In the introduction to his turn of the century translation for the Everyman edition, T. F. Royds argued that "just as the Latin poet had his pedigree, Virgil is here an adopted English poet, and his many translators have made for him an English pedigree too". So too, living in Devon as World War II progressed, C. Day Lewis saw his own translation as making a patriotic statement. As he commented later: "More and more I was buoyed up by a feeling that England was speaking to me through Virgil, and that the Virgil of the Georgics was speaking to me through the English farmers and labourers with whom I consorted." Among a multiplicity of earlier translations, his new version would be justified by avoiding "that peculiar kind of Latin-derived pidgin-English which infects the style of so many classical scholars" and making its appeal instead through an approachable, down-to-earth idiom.

In the 21st century, Frédéric Boyer's French version of the Georgics is retitled Le Souci de la terre (Care for the earth) and makes its appeal to current ecological concerns. "For me as a translator", he explains in his preface, "I find today’s tragic paradigm in relation to the earth being addressed to the future through the ancient work. In other words, the past is entering into dialogue with the future right now." And in part, as in Virgil's time, this ecological crisis has come as a result of a loss of focus, preoccupation in the past with foreign wars and civil conflict.

== Selected translations in English ==
- John Ogilby (1649), first complete Virgil in English including a translation of the Georgicks in couplets
- John Dryden (London, 1697) in heroic couplets
- William Sotheby (London, 1800) in heroic couplets
- R. D. Blackmore (London, 1871) in heroic couplets
- Musgrave Wilkins (London, 1873) "a literal translation" in prose
- James Rhoades (London 1881), blank verse
- Arthur Way (London, 1912) quantitative verse couplets
- J. W. Mackail (New York, 1934) prose
- C. Day-Lewis (London, 1940) quantitative verse
- Peter Fallon (Oxford World Classics, 2006) quantitative verse
- Kimberly Johnson (Penguin Classics, 2009) irregular verse

== European georgics ==
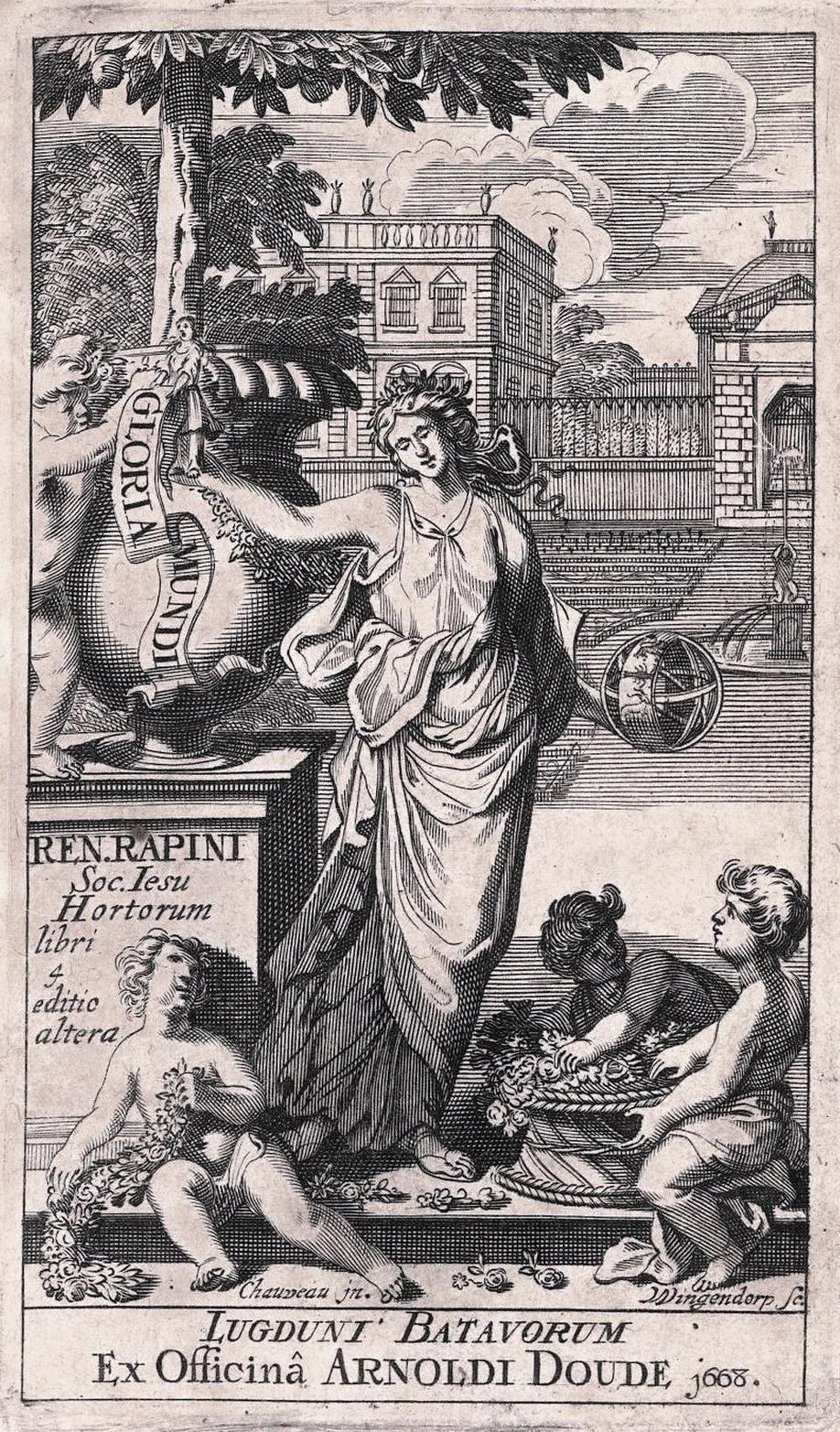
The frontispiece of René Rapin's Latin poem on gardens

=== Gardening guides ===
Virgil’s work addressed itself to far more than simple farming and later poems of a didactic tendency often dealt with, and elaborated on, individual subjects mentioned in the course of the Georgics. What has been described as "the earliest English georgic on any subject" limited itself to practical advice on gardening. Attributed to an unidentified Master John, "The Feate of Gardeninge" dates from the first half of the 15th century and provides instructions for sowing, planting and growing fruits, herbs and flowers through the course of the year. The poem’s 98 couplets are of irregular line-length and are occasionally imperfectly rhymed; the work was never printed, although annotated manuscript copies give evidence of its being studied and put to use.

Master John's poem heads the line of later gardening manuals in verse over the centuries. Included among them were poems in Latin like Giuseppe Milio's De Hortorum Cura (Brescia 1574) and René Rapin's popular Hortorum Libri IV (Of Gdns, 1665). The latter was a four-canto work in Latin hexameters, dealing respectively with flowers, disposition of trees, water and orchards, and was followed by two English versions shortly afterwards, translated by John Evelyn the Younger in 1673 and James Gardiner in 1706. Where those versions were written in rhyming couplets, however, William Mason later chose Miltonic blank verse for his The English Garden: A Poem in Four Books (1772–81), an original work that took the Georgics as its model. His French contemporary Jacques Delille, having already translated the Latin Georgics, now published his own four-canto poem on the subject of Les Jardins, ou l'Art d’embellir les paysages (Gardens, or the art of beautifying landscape, 1782). Like Mason, he gave his preference for landscaped over formal garden design and his work was several times translated into English verse over the following two decades.

=== Rural pursuits ===
In the case of many of these didactic manuals, the approach of the Georgics served as a model but the information in them is updated or supplements Virgil’s account. Thus Giovanni di Bernardo Rucellai's Le Api (Bees, 1542) restricts itself to the subject of the fourth book of the Georgics and is an early example of Italian blank verse. A Latin treatment of the subject figured as the fourteenth book of the original Paris edition of fr:Jacques Vanière's Praedium Rusticum (The Rural Estate) in 1696, but was to have a separate English existence in a verse translation by Arthur Murphy published from London in 1799, and later reprinted in the United States in 1808. But an earlier partial adaptation, Joshua Dinsdale's The Modern Art of Breeding Bees, had already appeared in London in 1740, prefaced with an apology to Virgil for trespassing on his ancient territory while bringing "some new Discov'ries to impart".

For his part, Marco Girolamo Vida struck out in a new entomological direction with his poem on the breeding and care of the silkworm, the two-canto De Bombycum cura ac usu (1527) written in Latin hexameters, which had been preceded by two poems in Italian on the same subject. Vida's work was followed in England by Thomas Muffet's The Silkwormes and their Flies (1599), a subject that he had studied in Italy. The poem was written in ottava rima, contained a wealth of Classical stories, and has been mentioned as "one of the earliest of English georgic poems".

Vida's poem was just one among several contemporary Latin works on exotic subjects that have been defined by Yasmin Haskell as 'recreational georgics', a group which "usually comprises one or two short books, treats self-consciously small-scale subjects, is informed by an almost pastoral mood" and deals with products for the aristocratic luxury market. Others included Giovanni Pontano's De Hortis Hesdperidum sive de cultu citriorum on the cultivation of citrus fruits (Venice 1505) and Pier Franceso Giustolo's De Croci Cultu on the cultivation of saffron (Rome 1510). There were also works on hunting like Natale Conti's De venatione (1551) and the Cynegeticon (Hunting with dogs) of Pietro degli Angeli which were the ultimate Italian ancestors of William Somervile's The Chace (London, 1735). The preface to the last of these notes with disapproval that one "might indeed have expected to have seen it treated more at large by Virgil in his third Georgick, since it is expressly Part of his Subject. But he has favoured us only with ten Verses."

The most encyclopaedic of the authors on country subjects was Jacques Vanière whose Praedium Rusticum reached its completest version in 1730. Integrated into its sixteen sections were several once issued as separate works. They included Stagna (Fishing, 1683), ultimately section 15, in which the author informs the reader (in the words of his English translator):

Of fish I sing, and to the rural cares
Now add the labours of my younger years…
Now more improved since first they gave me fame;
From hence to tend the doves and vine I taught,
And whate’er else my riper years have wrought.

That was followed by Columbae (Doves, 1684), mentioned in the lines above and ultimately section 13; by Vites (Vines, 1689), section 10; and by Olus (Vegetables, 1698), section 9. Two English clergymen poets later wrote poems more or less reliant on one or other of these sections. Joshua Dinsdale's The Dove Cote, or the art of breeding pigeons appeared in 1740; and John Duncombe’s Fishing (quoted above), which was an adaptation written in the 1750s but unpublished until 1809.

=== English Georgics ===
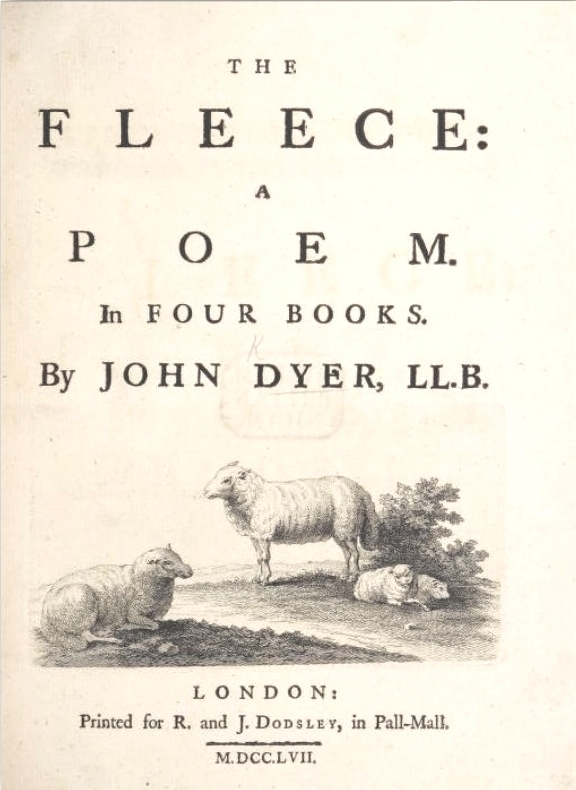
John Dyer's specialised georgic

Besides the 18th-century examples already mentioned, English poets wrote other Virgilian-styled georgics and country-themed pieces manifesting an appreciation of the rustic arts and the happiness of life on the country estate. Among them were poems directed to such specialised subjects as John Philips's Cyder (1708) and John Gay's Rural Sports: A Georgic (1713). Gay then went on to compose in Trivia, or the art of walking the streets of London (1716) "a full-scale mock Georgic". The poem is dependent on the method and episodes in Virgil's poem and may be compared with the contemporary renewal of classical genres in the mock epic and the introduction of urban themes into the eclogue by other Augustan poets at that period. Later examples of didactic georgics include Christopher Smart's The Hop-Garden (1752), Robert Dodsley's Agriculture (1753) and John Dyer's The Fleece (1757). Shortly afterwards, James Grainger went on to create in his The Sugar Cane (1764), a "West-India georgic", spreading the scope of this form into the Caribbean with the British colonial enterprise. Unlike most contemporary translations of Virgil, many of these practical manuals preferred Miltonic blank verse and the later examples stretched to four cantos, as in the Virgilian model.

Later still there were poems with a broader scope, such as James Grahame's The British Georgics (Edinburgh, 1809). His work was on a different plan, however, proceeding month by month through the agricultural year and concentrating on conditions in Scotland, considering that "the British Isles differ in so many respects from the countries to which Virgil's Georgics alluded". Jacques Delille had already preceded him in France with a similar work, L'Homme des champs, ou les Géorgiques françaises (Strasbourg, 1800), a translation of which by John Maunde had been published in London the following year as The Rural Philosopher: or French Georgics, a didactic poem, and in the USA in 1804. Both works, however, though they bear the name of georgics, have more of a celebratory than a didactic function. They are a different sort of work that, while paying homage and alluding to Virgil's poem, have another end in view.

This descriptive genre of writing had an equally Renaissance pedigree in Politian's poem Rusticus (1483), which he composed to be recited as an introduction to his lectures on the didactic poems of Hesiod and the Georgica. Its intention was to praise country living in the course of describing its seasonal occupations. A similar approach to the beauties of the countryside in all weathers was taken by James Thomson in the four sections of his The Seasons (1730). The poem has been described as "the supreme British achievement in the georgic genre, even though it has little to do with agriculture per se," and is more descriptive than didactic. Nevertheless, the Classical inspiration behind the work was so obvious that Thompson was pictured as writing it with "the page of Vergil literally open before him".

Other works in this vein moved further from the Virgilian didactic mode. William Cowper's discursive and subjective The Task (1785) has sometimes been included, as has Robert Bloomfield's The Farmer's Boy (1800). The latter proceeds through the farming year season by season and a partial translation into Latin was described by William Clubbe as being rendered "in the manner of the Georgics" (in morem Latini Georgice redditum). It was followed in the 20th century by Vita Sackville-West's The Land (1926), which also pursued the course of the seasons through its four books and balanced rural know-how with celebratory description in the mode of Georgian poetry.

== See also ==
- Bugonia
- Prosody (Latin)
