= Sphragis (literary device) =

Explicit authorial statement in which an author identifies himself or herself

Sphragis (Latin, from Greek σφραγίς 'sphragis' a seal or 'signet') is a modern term in literary theory and classical philology used to describe a literary device employed mainly in the classical world, in which an author names or otherwise identifies himself, most often at the beginning or the end of a poem or collection of poems. In the broader sense, it can refer to any technique when an author tries to hide his name or a reference to his identity in an encrypted manner (e.g. acrostic). The meaning of the word in the original literary contexts, however, is still not properly understood and the modern usage of the term may be historically inaccurate.

One of the earliest uses of the word can be attested in Theognis (19ff) in a "highly controversial passage" in which the poet speaks of setting his seal on his verses, to protect them from being plagiarized:

Let the seal [sphrēgis] of the wise man, Cyrnus, be set upon these lines, and they shall never be filched from him, nor shall evil ever be changed with their good, but every man shall say "These are the lines of Theognis of Megara, famous throughout the world"... (tr. J. M. Edmonds)

The device has been employed by many other writers in the Hellenistic and Roman period:

- Nicander, Theriaca 957-8
- Virgil, Georgics iv.563-6
- Horace, Odes iii.30
- Ovid, Amores iii.15

Sphragides became almost "mandatory" in Classical Arabic and Turkmen poetry (e.g. in the poems of Magtymguly Pyragy), but have been used by many modern poets as well (e.g. Bohdan Ihor Antonych or Sergey Esenin).
