= Screen Rant =

Entertainment news website

- Website type: Infotainment
- Available in: English
- Headquarters: Saint-Laurent, Quebec, Canada
- Founder: Vic Holtreman
- Parent: Valnet
- Website: screenrant.com
- Commercial: Yes
- Launched: 13 November 2003; 22 years ago
- Current status: Active

YouTube information
- Channel: Screen Rant
- Years active: 2008–present
- Genre: Review
- Subscribers: 8.43 million
- Views: 4.56 billion
- Last updated: November 19, 2025

Screen Rant is an entertainment website that offers news in the fields of television, films, video games, and comic books. It is owned by Valnet, parent of publications including Comic Book Resources, Collider, MovieWeb and XDA Developers.

== History ==
Screen Rant was launched by Vic Holtreman in 2003. In February 2015, Screen Rant was acquired by Valnet, an online media company based in Montreal, Quebec. It was combined with its sister site, Game Rant, in 2019, when Valnet acquired the other publication. Screen Rant founder, Vic Holtreman, who had served as the company's CEO, sold the website to Valnet.

== Pitch Meeting And Ryan George ==
Screen Rant features a video series called Pitch Meeting, which recently was formed into a separate channel, but still run by Screen Rant, the channel currently (2026) has 1.42 million subscribers. The series is hosted by YouTube comedian Ryan George. In the series, George plays both a screenwriter and a film producer in a pitch for a film or television series, describing its plot in a humorous way that highlights various inconsistencies.

Ryan George is a Canadian YouTuber who currently (2026) has 1.85 million subscribers on his main sketch comedy channel. He also has several other channels: a commentary channel, Ryan George Extra Plus, with an approximate current (2026) subscriber count of ~328,000 subscribers; a video compilation channel, The Ryan George Show, with an approximate current (2026) subscriber count of ~61,900 subscribers; and a co-owned sketch comedy channel, Moving Mind Studios, which includes two other YouTubers, Sam Roulston and Brandon Edwards, and has an approximate current (2026) subscriber count of ~52,600 subscribers.

== Screen Awards ==
In 2025, Screen Rant, in partnership with Valnet properties Collider, CBR, and MovieWeb, announced the first Screen Awards, honoring achievements in film, television, and anime.

=== 2025 ===
The inaugural nominees were announced on December 10, 2025. The winners were announced on December 24.

Best Picture	Best TV Series
One Battle After Another; Hamnet; Marty Supreme; Sinners; Weapons	The Pitt; Andor; Pluribus; Severance; Task
Best Lead Performance by an Actress – Film	Best Lead Performance by an Actress – TV
Jessie Buckley – Hamnet; Rose Byrne – If I Had Legs I'd Kick You; Chase Infiniti – One Battle After Another; Renate Reinsve – Sentimental Value; Emma Stone – Bugonia	Rhea Seehorn – Pluribus; Britt Lower – Severance; Bella Ramsey – The Last of Us; Jean Smart – Hacks; Michelle Williams – Dying for Sex
Best Lead Performance by an Actor – Film	Best Lead Performance by an Actor – TV
Michael B. Jordan – Sinners; Timothée Chalamet – Marty Supreme; Leonardo DiCaprio – One Battle After Another; Joel Edgerton – Train Dreams; Jesse Plemons – Bugonia	Noah Wyle – The Pitt; Ethan Hawke – The Lowdown; Adam Scott – Severance; Tim Robinson – The Chair Company; Seth Rogen – The Studio
Best Supporting Performance by an Actress – Film	Best Supporting Performance by an Actress – TV
Teyana Taylor – One Battle After Another; Ariana Grande – Wicked: For Good; Regina Hall – One Battle After Another; Wunmi Mosaku – Sinners; Amy Madigan – Weapons	Carrie Coon – The White Lotus; Patricia Arquette – Severance; Erin Doherty – Adolescence; Fiona Dourif – The Pitt; Katherine LaNasa – The Pitt
Best Supporting Performance by an Actor – Film	Best Supporting Performance by an Actor – TV
Sean Penn – One Battle After Another; Benicio del Toro – One Battle After Another; Jacob Elordi – Frankenstein; Paul Mescal – Hamnet; Stellan Skarsgård – Sentimental Value	Tramell Tillman – Severance; Zach Cherry – Severance; Owen Cooper – Adolescence; Sam Rockwell – The White Lotus; John Turturro – Severance
Best Anime Film	Best Anime Series
Chainsaw Man – The Movie: Reze Arc; 100 Meters; Demon Slayer: Kimetsu no Yaiba – The Movie: Infinity Castle; Jujutsu Kaisen: Execution; Scarlet	The Summer Hikaru Died; City the Animation; Gachiakuta; Solo Leveling; The Apothecary Diaries
Best Director	Best New TV Series Debut
Ryan Coogler – Sinners; Paul Thomas Anderson – One Battle After Another; Zach Cregger – Weapons; Joachim Trier – Sentimental Value; Chloé Zhao – Hamnet	The Pitt; The Chair Company; Pluribus; Task; The Studio
