= Gail Trimble =

British classical scholar (born 1982)

- Born: 13 August 1982 (age 44); Walton-on-Thames, Surrey, England
- Education: Corpus Christi College, Oxford (Classics DPhil)
- Occupation: Academic
- Employer: Trinity College, Oxford
- Known for: University Challenge 2009 series, captain of winning team (team later disqualified)
- Spouse: Tom West (m. 2010)
- Children: 1

Gail Trimble (born 13 August 1982) is a British academic specialising in Latin poetry and literary form. She was captain of the Corpus Christi College team for the BBC television programme University Challenge in 2009 and scored a high proportion of the team's points. While her team won the challenge, they were subsequently disqualified after it was found that one of her teammates had finished his studies while the show was being recorded. Trimble has continued to appear on quiz programmes. She is now a fellow and tutor in Classics at Trinity College, Oxford.

== Early life and education ==
Trimble was born in Walton-on-Thames, Surrey, to Mary and Michael Trimble. Her father worked as a manager for British Telecom and her mother was a magistrate at Staines Magistrates' Court.

Growing up, Trimble attended the Ambleside Infant and Middle School before enrolling at the private girls-only Lady Eleanor Holles School in Hampton, London. While there, she gained 11 GCSEs followed by four A-levels at grade A: in Latin, Ancient Greek, English literature and mathematics, plus one of the top five marks in the country with A-level general studies.

She was awarded a place at Corpus Christi College, Oxford, in 2000. She won a declamation prize at Oxford for Latin recital in 2001 and was also reported to give recitals in her lunchtimes at college as a soprano singer, and to lecture on Ovid, Hellenistic poetry and Catullus. Her research had been funded by the Arts and Humanities Research Council. In 2010, she was awarded a D.Phil. in Latin literature at Corpus Christi, Oxford, on the subject of Catullus. The title of her D.Phil. was "A commentary on Catullus 64, lines 1-201". Her doctoral project was supervised by Professor Philip Hardie and Dr Stephen Heyworth.

== Television and radio ==
While a postgraduate student of Latin literature at Corpus Christi College, Oxford, in 2009, she gained media attention by her performance on the BBC television quiz programme University Challenge. Trimble captained the Corpus Christi team from the second round onwards, and scored a high proportion of the team's points. In the rounds before reaching the final, Trimble had provided two-thirds of her team's total points: 825 out of 1,235. She was dubbed the "human Google" by media outlets. Corpus won with 275 points, beating Manchester's score of 190 points. However, the team was disqualified after an investigation revealed that her teammate, Sam Kay, had finished studying at Corpus Christi while the series was being recorded. The winner's trophy was awarded to the runners-up, Manchester University. Trimble attracted media attention, including misogynistic attacks in social media.

Trimble appeared in Series 13 of the BBC Quiz show Only Connect in 2017, as the captain of the "Meeples" team, accompanied by husband Tom West, and brother Hugh, a graduate of New College, Oxford. The team returned in 2018 for a "Family Special" episode.

On 9 January 2020 she was a panellist on BBC Radio 4's In Our Time for the edition on Catullus, and again on 29 April 2021 for the edition on Ovid. In 2022, she was a contestant in Brain of Britain.

== Career ==
In 2009, Trimble was elected as a junior research fellow of Trinity College, Cambridge and held the position for a year before returning to Oxford as a senior faculty member. She is associate professor in Classical Languages and Literature in the Faculty of Classics and Brown Fellow and Tutor in Classics at Trinity College, Oxford.

Trimble was one of the contributors to the 4th edition of the Oxford Classical Dictionary which was published in 2012. She is working on a commentary on Catullus' longest poem with newly edited text, to appear in the Cambridge University Press series Cambridge Classical Texts and Commentaries. Together with Sebastian Matzner, Trimble co-edited Metalepsis: Ancient Texts, New Perspectives, published by Oxford University Press in 2020, relating to metalepsis in classical texts, after an international conference in September 2015.

== Personal life ==
Trimble is a practising Anglican, and sang in the choir at the University Church of St Mary the Virgin, in Oxford.

In March 2009, Trimble became engaged to Tom West, a trainee solicitor, with whom she has a child. The couple married, in Corpus Christi College, in August 2010.

== Selected publications ==
- Matzner, Sebastian; Trimble, Gail, eds. (2020). Metalepsis: ancient texts, new perspectives (First ed.). Oxford: Oxford University Press. ISBN 9780198846987.
