= A. S. F. Gow =

British classical scholar and teacher (1886–1978)

Gow at Trinity College, Cambridge

Andrew Sydenham Farrar Gow (27 August 1886 – 2 February 1978) was an English classical scholar and teacher. Apart from eleven years as a master at Eton College between 1914 and 1925 his career was entirely at Trinity College, Cambridge.

At Trinity, Gow was a colleague and friend of A. E. Housman, on whose works he became an authority. The two men shared a sharp-tongued scholarly intolerance of anything they saw as slipshod, pretentious or badly thought-through, but Gow nonetheless won the affection of many of his students. He was Housman's literary executor, and published a book about his friend shortly after Housman's death.

Gow's principal subject as a scholar was the Greek bucolic poet Theocritus, his works on whom remain a core source for modern students of the poet.

== Life and career ==
=== Early life ===
Gow was born in Gower Street, London, the eldest of the three children, all of whom were boys, of Dr (later the Rev) James Gow (1854–1923) and his wife Gertrude Sydenham, née Everett-Green. James Gow, formerly a fellow of Trinity College, Cambridge, was headmaster of Nottingham High School from 1885 to 1901, and of Westminster School from 1901 to 1919. Gow was christened Andrew after an uncle who was Keeper of the Royal Academy, and, according to a biographical sketch in The Times, it may well have been from the uncle and his circle of friends, which included Poynter and Alma-Tadema, that Gow derived his interest in paintings.

Gow was educated at Nottingham High School and then at Rugby School, after which, in 1905, he won a classical scholarship to Trinity, Cambridge. In the following five years he twice won the Porson Prize for Greek verse composition, the Browne medal for Latin and Greek poetry, and the Charles Oldham Classical Scholarship. Together with Rupert Brooke and others he helped to found the Marlowe Society. He took a first class in both parts of the tripos, gaining a distinction in classical archaeology.

=== Early career ===
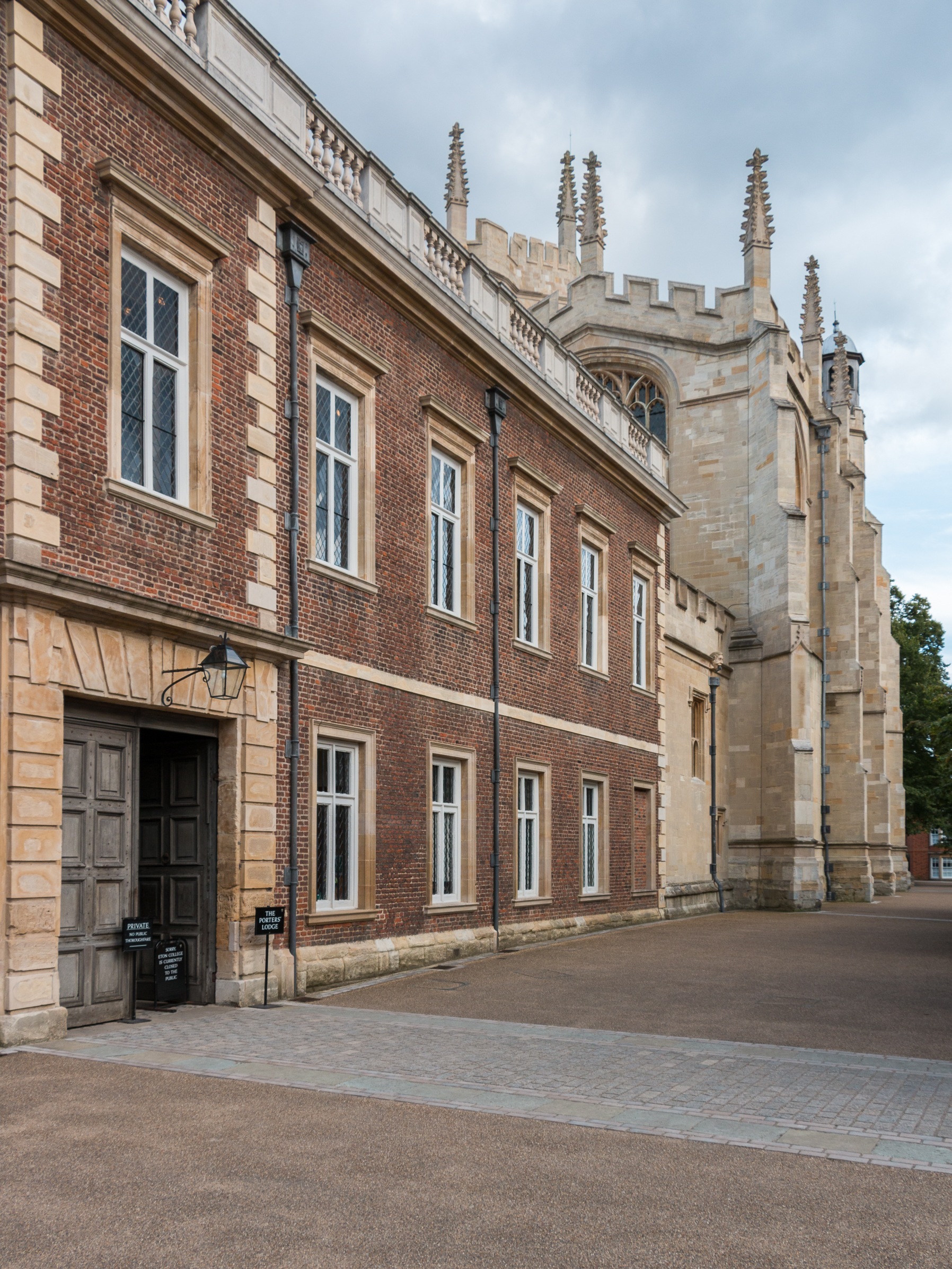
Eton College, where Gow taught between 1914 and 1925

Gow was elected a Fellow of Trinity in 1911, and took a number of pupils. He applied on four occasions for permanent posts in Cambridge, but was unsuccessful each time. His biographer Hugh Lloyd-Jones suggests that Gow's personality and appearance were a hindrance:

It was feared that he would alarm and discourage his pupils, particularly the weaker sort. Indeed Gow's appearance was formidable, an uncompromisingly Scottish (Note: The Gows were of Scottish descent.) kind of countenance being set off by bushy eyebrows and side-whiskers, and anything like conceit or pretentiousness on the part of a pupil might provoke a wounding sarcasm.

In 1914 Gow became a master at Eton College, where he remained for eleven years. He did not serve in the armed forces during the First World War, because a heart murmur disqualified him for service; he volunteered to help train young soldiers in the use of the Lewis gun. Lloyd-Jones comments that some of Gow's Eton pupils were daunted by his dryness and his caustic wit, others recognised his fine scholarship and the considerable help he gave them; he became known, not unaffectionately, as "Granny Gow" by pupils and colleagues. His Eton pupils included Alan Clutton-Brock, David Lindsay, Anthony Powell, and George Orwell.

=== Trinity don ===
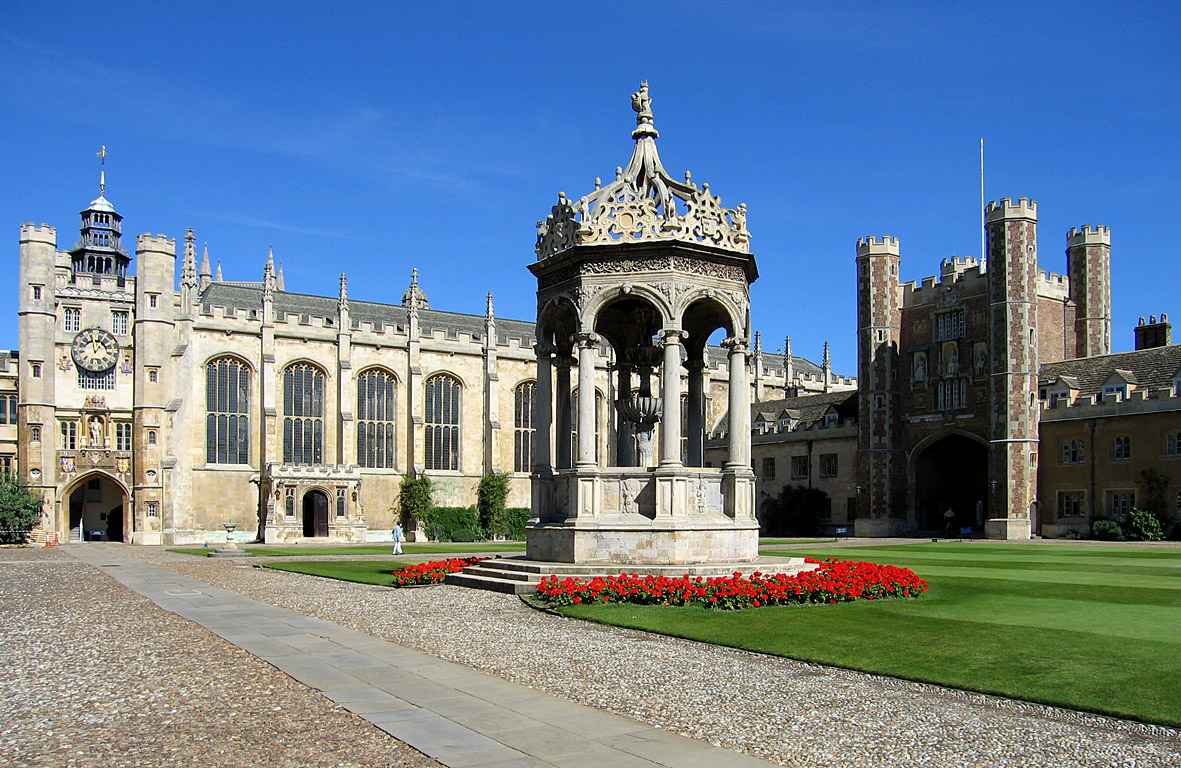
Trinity College, Cambridge, where Gow lectured from 1925

By 1925 Gow was settled at Eton and looking forward to becoming a housemaster, when he was invited to resume his fellowship at Trinity as a preliminary to being appointed Tutor. He hesitated because his perfectionism led him to question whether he could meet the academic standards he felt necessary for such a post. Two academics who knew him well, D. S. Robertson and A. E. Housman convinced him that his doubts were unwarranted, and he accepted. Trinity remained his home for the rest of his life. He was a University Lecturer, 1925–51; Tutor, 1929–42; Praelector, 1946–51; and Brereton Reader in Classics, 1947–51.

Gow served successively on the Council of the Senate, the General Board of the Faculties, and, as chairman, the Board of Fine Arts. More congenial to him, according to The Times, was his long membership of the Fitzwilliam Museum board. Lloyd-Jones writes that Gow did much to interest undergraduates in art, "a subject by no means popular among the Cambridge dons of his generation." Though not a man of means, Gow became a respected collector and connoisseur of art. Among the undergraduates who were grateful for his enthusiasm and guidance was Anthony Blunt; (Note: Blunt became a Soviet agent, part of the Cambridge Five; his pupil, the art critic Brian Sewell, speculated in 1982 that Gow might also have been a member of the ring. Gow's former pupil Anthony Powell, discounted the notion, believing that their mutual friend George Orwell, a man of intense political views, would have known of and commented on any left-wing political interests on Gow's part.) he wrote of Gow:

During the years after his return to Cambridge in 1924 he was almost the only don to take a positive interest in the art of the past and his rooms were the one place where one could find a good library of books about the Italian Renaissance, a fine collection of photographs of paintings and above all stimulating conversation about the arts in general. Though his influence in this field only spread to a relatively small circle of undergraduates it had a vitally important effect on them and through them on others in Cambridge and eventually elsewhere.

Gow, like his friend and Trinity colleague Housman, was known for his high standards, impatience with anything second-rate, and a sharp tongue. His Eton colleague and lifelong friend George Lyttelton commented, "That Housman blend of an impossibly lofty and unsympathetic standard with needlessly abusive words is really very regrettable and unhelpful". The Times observed that another side to Gow's character was shown in the letters he wrote month by month to pupils serving in the forces during the Second World War: "In them he is as his friends knew him – wise, warm-hearted, and possessed of a rich sense of humour. For Housman, "No one could have a better friend than I have found in Gow," although even Gow sometimes found the older man daunting: when asked by colleagues to put a knotty question of translation to Housman, he refused, on the grounds that Housman would merely say that the meaning was obvious to the feeblest intellect. Shortly after Housman's death in 1936 he published a short study of his friend; although it concentrated on Housman's scholarship, in Lloyd-Jones's view it "throws more light upon him than almost any of the studies by literary persons". Gow acted as Housman's literary executor, collaborating uneasily with Laurence Housman, the poet's brother, whom he found difficult; Gow supervised a second edition of Housman's edition of Manilius in 1937.

From 1947 to 1953 Gow served as a trustee of the National Gallery. He built up a private collection of the works of Degas, which he left to the Fitzwilliam Museum.

Gow's scholarly publications include editions of his main study, Theocritus, and works by Nicander, Machon, Moschus, and Bion. He prepared the second edition of Housman's edition of Manilius, and the second volume of Sir William Ridgeway's The Early Age of Greece. In Lloyd-Jones's view Gow's work on Theocritus and Hellenistic epigrams will remain "an essential instrument of scholarship".

In 1951 Gow retired from his lecturing posts, continuing to live in rooms at Trinity until 1973 when he moved to a nursing home in Cambridge, where he died in 1978 at the age of ninety-one. He never married.

== Works by Gow ==
=== Author ===
- Gow, A. S. F. (1936). A. E. Housman: A Sketch and List of his Writings. Cambridge: University Press. OCLC 1039549454.
- Gow, A. S. F. (1945). Letters from Cambridge (1939–1944). Cambridge: University Press.

=== Editor and translator ===
- Ridgeway, W. (1931). Gow, A. S. F.; Robertson, D. S. (eds.). The Early Age of Greece. Vol. II. Cambridge: University Press.
- Manilius (1937). Housman, A. E.; Gow, A. S. F. (eds.). Astronomica. Vol. I–V (2nd ed.). Cambridge: University Press.
- Gow, A. S. F., ed. (1950). Theocritus. Vol. I–II. Cambridge: University Press.
- Gow, A. S. F., ed. (1953). Bucolici Graeci. OCT. Oxford: Clarendon Press.
- Theocritus; Moschus; Bion (1953). Gow, A. S. F. (ed.). The Greek Bucolic Poets. Cambridge: University Press.
- Nicander (1953). Gow, A. S. F.; Scholfield, A. S. (eds.). The Poems and Poetical Fragments. Cambridge: University Press.
- Machon (1965). Gow, A. S. F. (ed.). The Fragments. Cambridge Classical Texts And Commentaries, 1. Cambridge: University Press.
- Gow, A. S. F.; Page, D. L., eds. (1965). The Greek Anthology. Vol. I: Hellenistic Epigrams. Cambridge: University Press.
- Gow, A. S. F.; Page, D. L., eds. (1968). The Greek Anthology. Vol. II: The Garland of Philip and Contemporary Epigrams. Cambridge: University Press.

== Notes, references and sources ==
=== Sources ===
- Agathocleous, Tanya (2000). George Orwell. New York: Oxford University Press. ISBN 978-0-19-512185-8.
- Lyttelton, G W; Rupert Hart-Davis (1978). Lyttelton/Hart-Davis Letters, Volume 1. London: John Murray. ISBN 978-0-7195-3478-2.
- Lyttelton, G W; Rupert Hart-Davis (1982). Lyttelton/Hart-Davis Letters, Volume 4. London: John Murray. ISBN 978-0-7195-3941-1.
- Powell, Anthony (2015). Journals, 1982–1986. London: Arrow Books. ISBN 978-1-78475-071-8.
