= Moschus =

2nd-century BC Greek poet

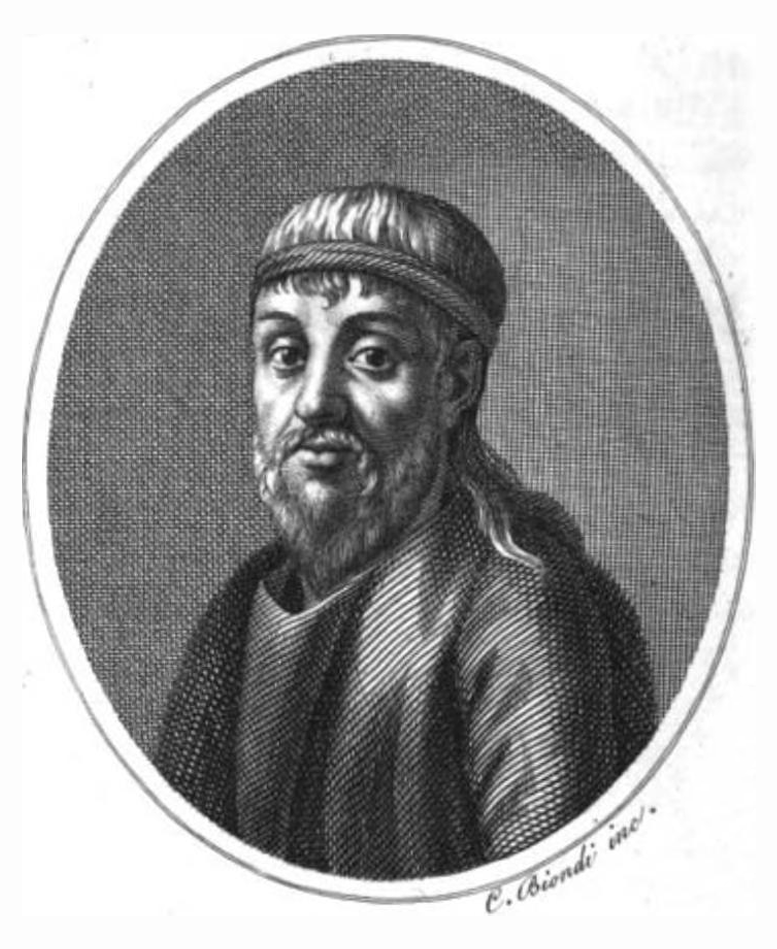
19th-century likeness of Moschus

Moschus (Greek: Μόσχος) was an ancient Greek bucolic poet and student of the Alexandrian grammarian Aristarchus of Samothrace. He was born at Syracuse, Magna Graecia, and flourished about 150 BC. Aside from his poetry, he was known for his grammatical work, nothing of which survives.

== Works ==
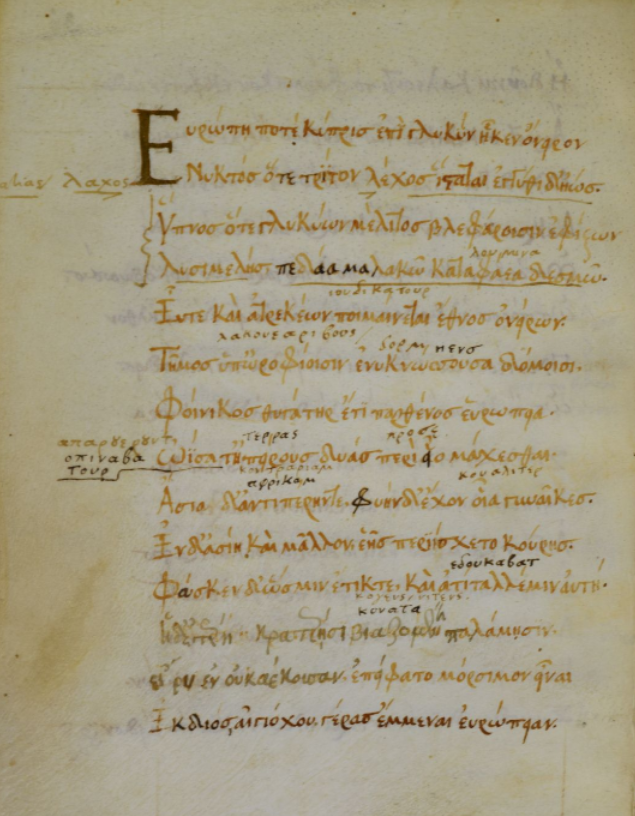
Page from a 15th-century Byzantine manuscript of Europa

His few surviving works consist of an epyllion, the Europa, on the myth of Europa, three bucolic fragments and a whole short bucolic poem Runaway Love, and an epigram in elegiac couplets. His surviving bucolic material (composed in the traditional dactylic hexameters and Doric dialect) is short on pastoral themes and is largely erotic and mythological; although this impression may be distorted by the paucity of evidence, it is also seen in the surviving bucolic of the generations after Moschus, including the work of Bion of Smyrna. Moschus' poetry is typically edited along with other bucolic poets, as in the commonly used Oxford text by A. S. F. Gow (1952), but the Europa has often received separate scholarly editions, as by Winfried Bühler (Wiesbaden 1960) and Malcolm Campbell (Hildesheim 1991). The epigram is also normally published with the edition by Maximos Planoudes of the Greek Anthology.

=== Influence ===
The Europa, along with Callimachus' Hecale and such Latin examples as Catullus 64, is a major example of the Hellenistic phenomenon of the epyllion. Although it is hard to tell because of the fragmentary nature of the evidence, Moschus' influence on Greek bucolic poetry is likely to have been significant; the influence of Runaway Love is felt in Bion and other later bucolic poets. In later European literature his work was imitated or translated by such authors as Torquato Tasso and Ben Jonson.

=== Apocrypha ===
Two other poems, attributed to him at one time or another but no longer thought to be his, are also commonly edited with his work. The best known is the Epitaph on Bion (i.e. Bion of Smyrna), which had a long history of influence on the pastoral lament for a poet (compare Milton's Lycidas). The other is a miniature epic on Megara (the wife of Heracles), consisting of an epic dialogue between Heracles' mother and his wife on his absence.

== Sources ==
- For a recent overview of Moschus see A. Porro in Eikasmos 10 (1999) 125–25.
- There are English translations by J. Banks in Bohn's Classical Library (1853), and by Andrew Lang (1889), together with Bion of Smyrna and Theocritus.
- See also Franz Susemihl, Geschichte der griechischen Litteratur in der Alexandrinerzeit. i. 231 (1891).
