= Theriaca =

Theriaca may refer to:

- Theriaca (poem) by Nicander of Colophon, Greek poet of 2nd century BC
- Theriaca or Theriac, ancient Greek remedy
- Venice treacle, also called Andromachi theriaca, antidote against venom

== See also ==
- Treacle
