= Sphragis =

Sphragis is a Greek word for "seal".

It may refer to:

- special seal called sphragis or Panagiari to stamp prosphora bread
- Sphragis (literary device), an explicit authorial statement in which an author identifies themselves
- Mating plug, a gelatinous secretion used in the mating of some species
