= Bion of Smyrna =

1st-century BC Greek bucolic poet

Bion (Βίων /ˈbaɪɒn/) was an ancient Greek bucolic poet from Smyrna, probably active at the end of the second or beginning of the first century BC. He is named in the Suda as one of three canonical bucolic poets alongside Theocritus and Moschus. One long poem about Adonis and seventeen shorter fragments of his poetry survive.

== Life ==
According to the Suda Bion was from Phlossa, which is not otherwise known but may have been one of the villages which made up Smyrna. Ancient sources do not record Bion's dates or any details about his life, but he likely was active in the late second or early first century BC. He seems to have been influenced by his fellow bucolic poet Moschus, who was active in the mid-second century, and to have been known by Meleager of Gadara in the early first century BC. An anonymous poem, the "Epitaph to Bion" says that he was poisoned and implies that he died young. Based on a reference in the "Epitaph to Bion" to "Ausonian grief", it has been proposed that the author of the epitaph was Italian and that Bion had travelled to Italy; however there is no other evidence for this and if the author of the epitaph had ever met Bion in person they could equally well have done so while travelling from Italy to Smyrna.

== Poetry ==
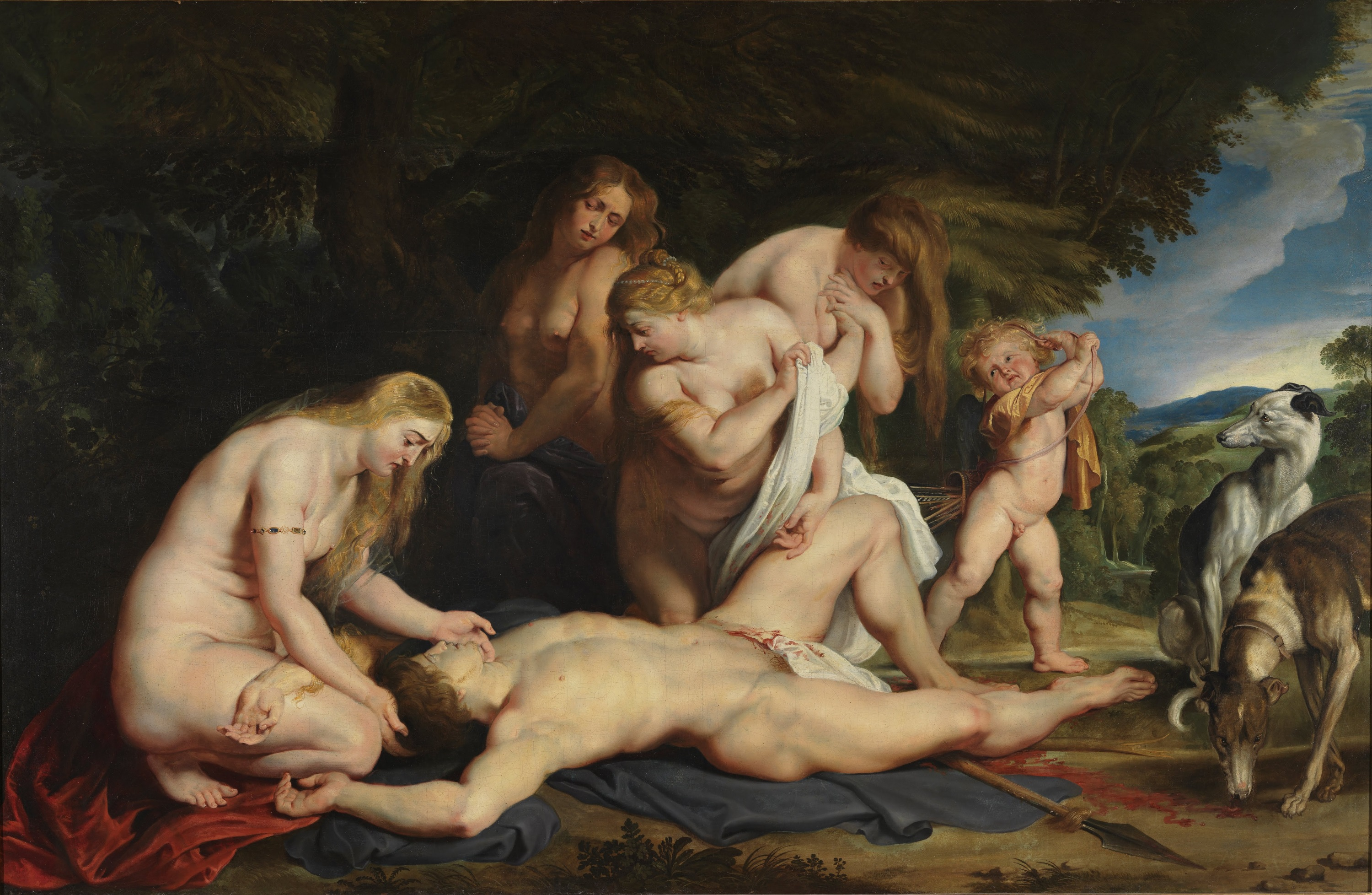
Bion's longest surviving poem is a lament for Adonis, whose death is depicted in this painting by Peter Paul Rubens.

The Suda and the scholiast on the Palatine Anthology name Bion alongside Theocritus and Moschus as a bucolic poet; he also wrote erotic poetry. His surviving work comprises the "Lament to Adonis" and seventeen shorter fragments. The first sixteen fragments were preserved by Johannes Stobaeus; the seventeenth fragment was preserved by Orion of Thebes.

Another poem, an epithalamium for Achilles and Deidameia, is transmitted anonymously in the manuscript tradition but has also been attributed to Bion; however there is no strong evidence for this attribution. Several other poems transmitted as part of the bucolic corpus, as well as a fragmentary hexameter poem preserved on a papyrus from the third century AD, have sometimes been attributed to Bion.

All Bion's surviving poetry is composed in dactylic hexameter and in a Doric dialect, which is typical of ancient bucolic poetry. The "Lament to Adonis" is 98 lines long; the other fragments are shorter, ranging from a single line to eighteen lines long, and totalling around another 100 lines. One of these fragments, about a bird hunter's attempt to hunt Eros, is probably a complete poem. The remaining fragments seem to come from at least four further poems; no two fragments are certainly from the same poem.

Bion's work continued to be read until the sixth century AD, and was alluded to by ancient poets including Meleager of Gadara, Ovid, Catullus, and Nonnus. The Greek novelists Achilles Tatius, Longus, and Heliodorus also reference Bion. Pseudo-Moschus' "Epitaph for Bion" references Bion's works, particularly the "Lament for Adonis".

Bion's longest poem, the "Lament to Adonis", is preserved on two medieval manuscripts. It was transmitted anonymously, with one source attributing it to Theocritus. It was first attributed to Bion by Joachim Camerarius in 1530, and has generally been attributed to Bion since, based on the "Epitaph for Bion"'s apparent references and metrical similarities with Bion's fragments. The "Lament for Adonis" is influenced by traditional Greek lament. It may have been inspired by the Adonis hymn in Theocritus' Idyll 15, though in genre it is more similar to the lament for Daphnis in Idyll 1, which it repeatedly alludes to. It is also influenced by the works of Callimachus.

== Works cited ==
- Fantuzzi, Marco (2006). "Bion [2]". Brill's New Pauly. doi:10.1163/1574-9347_bnp_e217640.
- Gramps, Adrian (2021). The Fiction of Occasion in Hellenistic and Roman Poetry. de Gruyter. ISBN 9783110731606.
- Griffiths, Alan H. (2012). "Bion [2]". Oxford Classical Dictionary.
- Holden, Anthony (1974). Greek Pastoral Poetry: Theocritus, Bion, Moschus, the Pattern Poems. Penguin.
- Hopkinson, Neil (2015). Theocritus, Moschus, Bion. Cambridge MA: Harvard University Press.
- Landfester, Manfred (2011). "Bion of Smyrna". Brill's New Pauly Supplements I Online – Volume 2. doi:10.1163/2214-8647_bnps2_COM_0050.
- Reed, J.D. (1997). Bion of Smyrna: The Fragments and the Adonis. Cambridge: Cambridge University Press. ISBN 0-521-57316-5.
