= Joshua Dinsdale =

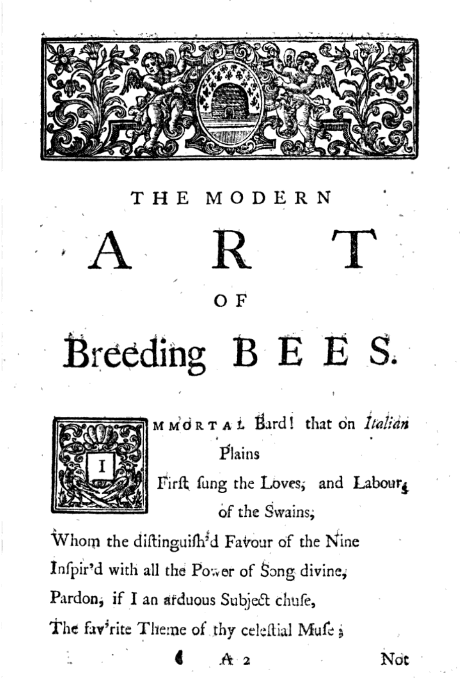
The opening lines of Joshua Dinsdale's 1740 poem on bees

Joshua Dinsdale was a publisher and translator, who published books, pamphlets and poems between the years 1740–51. Little information remains of him. He had a Master of Arts degree, signified by the letters A.M. after his name on one of his translations. That he may also have been a clergyman is suggested by his A Sermon on Charity published in August 1740. In 1740, he also published two free adaptations of sections from fr:Jacques Vanière's Latin poem Praedium Rusticum, a georgic compendium of rural know-how popular during the 18th century. The Dove-Cote or, the art of breeding pigeons, a poem (Joseph Davidson, London 1740) was a version of the 13th section (Columbae) of Vanière's poem; this was published anonymously but later ascribed to Dinsdale. It was followed by The Modern Art of Breeding Bees (in the same year and from the same publisher), this time signed with his name. However, only the first two cantos of the 14th section of Vanière's work (Apes, published separately in London in 1729) were drawn upon for that work. And Dinsdale's own opening lines are addressed to Virgil, who dealt with the subject of bee culture in the fourth book of his Georgica, thus placing Dinsdale's poem too in the 18th century tradition of English classical imitations.

Following this literary debut, he began contributing poems, reviews and translations to both The London Magazine and The Scots Magazine. Among the translations were more from the Latin, in this case of poems by the Polish-born Maciej Kazimierz Sarbiewski. His final appearances in The London Magazine were a review and a poem in its volume 20 in 1751. However, two more translations by Dinsdale were published the following year. The first, Parmenides Prince of Macedonia, was of the French novel La fidelité couronnée, ou, L'histoire de Parmenide, prince de Macedoine by Le Coq-Madeleine, originally published in 1706. The other was a translation from the Greek of The Orations and Epistles of Isocrates. For all that Dinsdale apologised in his preface that he had "neither designed it too literal or too paraphrastical" (as had been his practice with Vanière), the work was later to be dismissed as "a correct translation without much ornament of style". Mention on the title page that the translation had been "revis’d by the Rev. Mr. Young" may suggest that Dinsdale was dead by then.
