= Epyllion =

Short epic poem

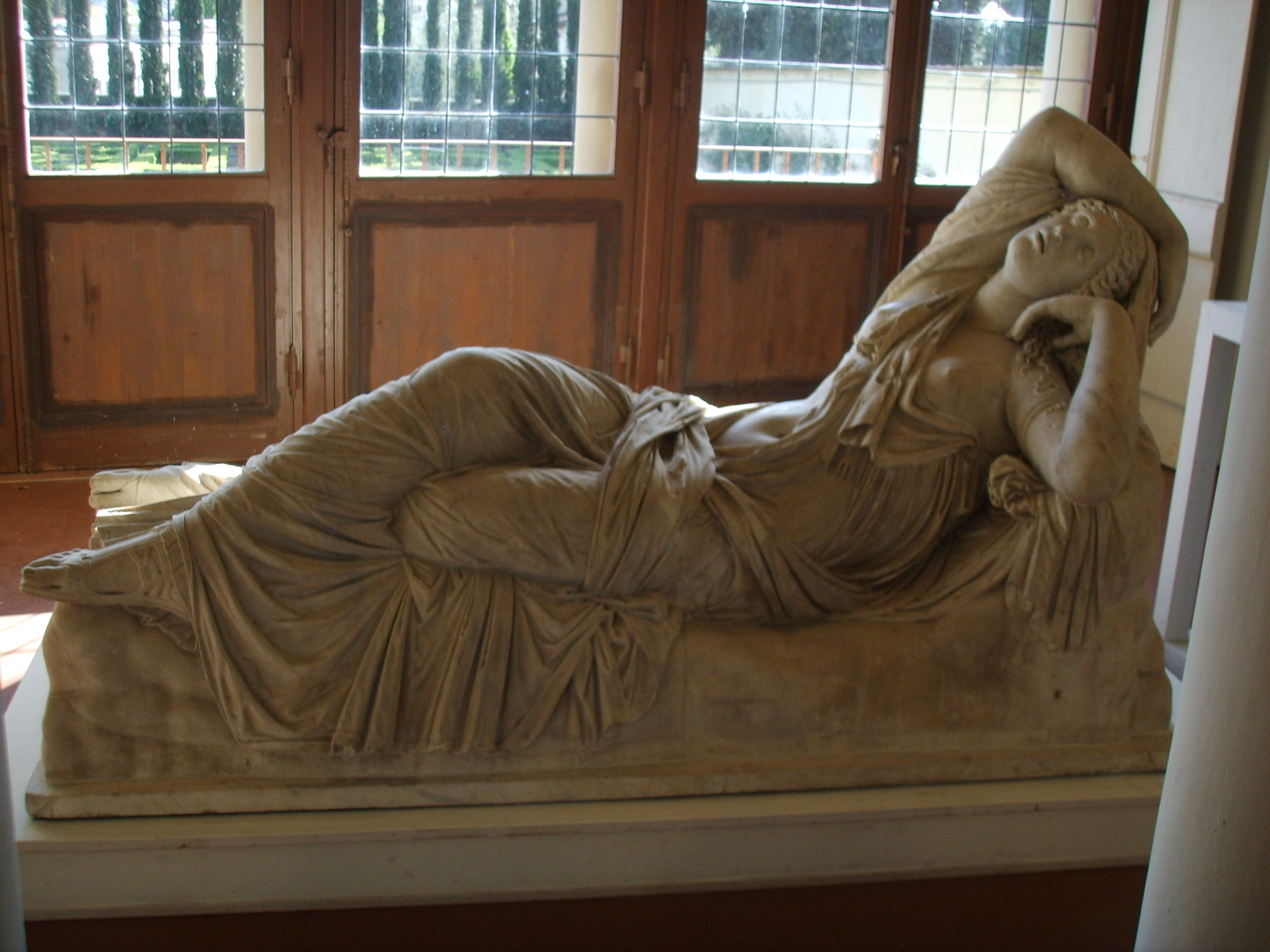
A sleeping Ariadne's abandonment by Theseus is the topic of an elaborate ecphrasis in Catullus 64, the most famous extant epyllion (Roman copy of a 2nd-century BCE Greek original; Villa Corsini)

In classical studies the term epyllion (Ancient Greek: ἐπύλλιον, plural: ἐπύλλια, epyllia) refers to a comparatively short narrative poem (or discrete episode within a longer work) that shows formal affinities with epic, but betrays a preoccupation with themes and poetic techniques that are not generally or, at least, primarily characteristic of epic proper.

== Etymology and modern usage ==
Ancient Greek ἐπύλλιον (epyllion) is the diminutive of ἔπος (epos) in that word's senses of "verse" or "epic poem"; Liddell and Scott's Greek–English Lexicon thus defines ἐπύλλιον as a "versicle, scrap of poetry" or "short epic poem", citing for the latter definition Athenaeus, Deipnosophistae 2.68 (65a–b):

ὅτι τὸ εἰς Ὅμηρον ἀναφερόμενον ἐπύλλιον, ἐπιγραφόμενον δὲ Ἐπικιχλίδες, ἔτυχε ταύτης τῆς προσηγορίας διὰ τὸ τὸν Ὅμηρον ᾄδοντα αὐτὸ τοῖς παισὶ κίχλας δῶρον λαμβάνειν, ἱστορεῖ Μέναιχμος ἐν τῷ περὶ τεχνιτῶν.

A short epic (epyllion) attributed to Homer, entitled The One for the Thrushes, acquired this name because Homer was rewarded with thrushes when he sang it to his children—Menaechmus tells the story in his On Artisans.

This is in fact the only ancient instance of the word that shows anything approaching the connotations with which it is most often employed by modern scholars, and epyllion did not enter the common language of criticism until the 19th century. Wolf was apparently responsible for popularizing the term, for two of his essays from early in that century are referred to by titles including epyllion: Ad Scutum Herculis epyllion Hesiodo subditum animadversiones (Observations on the Shield of Heracles, an Epyllion Falsely Attributed to Hesiod) and Theocriti idyllia et epyllia (The Idylls and Epyllia of Theocritus). The locus classicus for the sense of epyllion as a hexametric mythological poem that is not only comparatively short, but also imbued to some extent with the characteristics of Hellenistic poetry is Moritz Haupt's 1855 study of Catullus 64, but it is likely that Haupt was using a term that had in the preceding decades become common to discussions of the shorter narrative poems of the Alexandrians.

In the early 20th century the first studies specifically devoted to the concept of the epyllion were undertaken, with Leumann's work on Hellenistic epyllia, Jackson's study of the possible Roman examples, and Crump's attempt at a diachronic study of the epyllion as a single genre whose history could be traced from the Greek poems of the Hellenistic period through the Augustan period's Latin texts. The exact meaning and applicability of the term epyllion has remained a matter of dispute, and Richard Hunter's recent appraisal summarizes well the current opinion regarding epyllia:

Even if the term "epyllion" has no ancient authority, there has seemed to be a phenomenon which cannot be ignored. Modern discussion has, however, been bedevilled by the grouping together of poems so diverse as to render that grouping almost meaningless, however many points of individual contact they may share.

== Characteristics ==
An epyllion is, in its most basic definition, a narrative poem written in dactylic hexameters that is comparatively short. There is disagreement about whether the term should also be applied to works written in elegiac couplets. The exact meaning of "comparatively short" varies among modern scholars, with some considering Theocritus, Idyll 13 (75 lines) an epyllion, while Eratosthenes' Hermes is commonly classed as an example, even though at some 1,600 lines it would probably have taken up two papyrus rolls. A similar variation in lengths is found in epyllia that form episodes within larger works. Virgil's Nisus and Euryalus digression in the Aeneid totals 73 verses and is sometimes considered an epyllion, while the so-called Aristaeus-epyllion (Georgics 4.315–558) is considerably more substantial and reminiscent of independent epyllia from the Hellenistic period.

=== Subject matter and tone ===
The subject matter of an epyllion often revolves around lesser-known myths or episodes from well-known myths, providing a fresh perspective on familiar stories. These poems frequently delve into themes of love, passion, and the complexities of human relationships. For instance, Catullus's "Poem 64" narrates the marriage of Peleus and Thetis, weaving in the story of Ariadne's abandonment by Theseus. This focus on intimate, personal moments allows the epyllion to explore the emotional and psychological dimensions of its characters in a way that grand epics might not.

In terms of tone, epyllion are characterized by their lively descriptions and a miniaturist approach to storytelling. They often employ a scholarly and allusive style, filled with references to other literary works and mythological tales. The tone can be elevated and formal, similar to that of elegy, but it also allows for a more subjective and emotional expression. This blend of high style with personal, emotional content gives the epyllion a unique voice within the broader landscape of classical literature.

=== Poetic techniques ===
Callimachus, Hecale fr. 1 Hollis = 230 Pf.:

Ἀκταίη τις ἔναιεν Ἐρεχθέος ἔν ποτε γουνῷ.	A certain Attic woman once resided in Erechtheus' highlands

Catullus 64.50–54:

haec vestis priscis hominum variata figuris heroum mira virtutes indicat arte. namque fluentisono prospectans litore Diae, Thesea cedentem celeri cum classe tuetur indomitos in corde gerens Ariadna furores	This cloth, embellished with the figures of earlier men, showed with remarkable art the virtues of the heroes. For gazing from the wave-resounding shore of Dia, she saw Theseus departing with his swift ship, Ariadna, nursing indomitable furor in her heart.

== List of epyllia ==
=== Hellenistic ===
- Philitas, Hermes
- Alexander Aetolus, Fisherman
- Callimachus, Hecale
- Theocritus 13, 22, 24, [25]
- Eratosthenes, Hermes (debated)
- Moschus, Europa
- Batrachomyomachia, Homer (Roman attribution)

=== Latin ===
- Cinna, Zmyrna
- Calvus, Io
- Catullus 64
- Ciris
- Vergil, Georgics 4.315–558: the Aristaeus-epyllion
- Vergil, Aeneid 9.182–234: Nisus and Euryalus
- Ovid, Metamorphoses 8.611–724: Baucis and Philemon

=== Late antiquity ===
- Coluthus, Rape of Helen
- Musaeus, Hero and Leander

== Early Modern Epyllia ==
In the late 16th century, the genre made a resurgence in Britain. Produced mainly by students of the Inns of Court, this new branch of epyllia was an opportunity for them to develop and express radically new ideas about romance and poetry. Writers such as Christopher Marlowe, John Marston, George Chapman, Thomas Lodge, and Shakespeare were only a few of the notable figures who took part in this trend. The early modern epyllion is a trivialized reduction of the grandiose themes of the Greek epic, focusing instead on erotically charged self-exploration. Featuring an Ovidian narrator, these poems reject the idea of the Petrarchan lover and its gender protocol in order to produce a witty and stylized male ego that displays high rhetoric and legalistic language against a backdrop of licentious behaviour.

=== List of Early Modern Epyllia ===
- Christopher Marlowe, Hero and Leander (1598)
- Thomas Lodge, Scillaes Metamorphosis (1589)
- William Shakespeare, Venus and Adonis (1593)
- Thomas Heywood, Oenone and Paris (1594)
- George Chapman, Ovid's Banquet of Sense (1595)
- Michael Drayton, Endimion and Phoebe: Ideas and Latmus (1595)
- Thomas Edwards, Cephalus and Procris (1595)
- George Chapman, Hero and Leander cont. (1598)
- Henry Petowe, The Second Part of Hero and Leander Containing Their Further Fortunes (1598)
- John Marston, The Metamorphosis of Pygmalion's Image (1598)
- John Weever, Faunus and Melliflora (1600)

== Bibliography ==
- Allen, W. (1940), "The Epyllion: A Chapter in the History of Literary Criticism", TAPA, 71: 1–26.
- Allen, W. (1958), "The Non-Existent Classical Epyllion", Studies in Philology, 55: 515–18.
- Brown, Georgia, ed. (2004), "Literature as fetish", Redefining Elizabethan Literature, Cambridge: Cambridge University Press.
- Courtney, E. (1996), "Epyllion", in S. Hornblower; A. Spawforth (eds.), Oxford Classical Dictionary (3rd rev. ed.), Oxford, ISBN 9780198661726.
- Crump, M.M. (1931), The Epyllion from Theocritus to Ovid, Oxford.
- Ellis, Jim (2003-01-31). Sexuality and Citizenship: Metamorphosis in Elizabethan Erotic Verse. Toronto: University of Toronto Press.
- Fantuzzi, M. (2004), "Epyllion", in H. Cancik; H. Schneider (eds.), Brill's New Pauly: Antiquity, vol. 4 (Cyr–Epy), ISBN 9789004122673.
- Fantuzzi, M.; Hunter, R. (2005), Tradition and Innovation in Hellenistic Poetry, Cambridge, ISBN 978-0521835114.
- Fordyce, C. J. (1961), Catullus: A Commentary, Oxford, ISBN 978-0198721475.
- Haupt, M (1876), Opuscula: volumen secundum, Leipzig. (Reprinted in 1967 by Georg Olms Verlag (Hildesheim))
- Hollis, A.S. (1990), Callimachus: Hecale, Oxford, ISBN 0-19-814044-4.
- Jackson, C.N. (1913), "The Latin Epyllion", Harvard Studies in Classical Philology, 24: 37–50, doi:10.2307/310518, JSTOR 310518.
- Leumann, J. (1904), De epyllio Alexandino, Königsee.
- Most, G.W. (1982), "Neues zur Geschichte des Terminus 'Epyllion'", Philologus, 126 (1–2): 153–6, doi:10.1524/phil.1982.126.12.153, S2CID 164757050.
- Reilly, J.F. (1953), "Origins of the Word 'Epyllion'", The Classical Journal, 49: 111–14.
- Vessey, D.W.T.C. (1970), "Thoughts on the Epyllion", The Classical Journal, 66: 38–43.
