= Florentinus (prefect) =

Florentinus was a Roman politician who served as Urban prefect of Rome from 395 to 397 AD.

== Career ==
A native of Augusta Treverorum, Florentinus was possibly a Notarius around 379/380 AD. He was the Comes sacrarum largitionum in the west from 385 to 386 and the Quaestor sacri palatii in 395. After this, he was given the post of Praefectus urbi of Rome, serving from 395 to the end of 397 AD before he was replaced by Lampadius. During his time as Urban Prefect, Florentinus received numerous missives from the emperor Honorius concerning the duties, restrictions and rewards for the decurions. He was also reprimanded by the emperor for issuing post warrants without imperial authorisation. Soon after his term as Urban Prefect had ended, he entered into retirement, living in Gaul.

During his time in office, he received regular correspondence from Quintus Aurelius Symmachus, while Claudian dedicated to him the second book of De raptu Proserpinae. Florentinus had at least one son, called Minervius.

== Sources ==
- Martindale, John R.; Jones, A. H. M.; Morris, John, eds. (1971). The Prosopography of the Later Roman Empire: Volume I, AD 260–395. Cambridge: Cambridge University Press. ISBN 0-521-07233-6.
