= Idyll XV =

Mime by the 3rd-century BC Greek poet Theocritus

Idyll XV, also called "The Women at the Adonis-Festival" in English, is a mime by the 3rd-century BC Greek poet Theocritus. This idyll describes the visit paid by two Syracusan women residing in Alexandria, to the festival of the resurrection of Adonis.

== Summary ==
Plan of Ptolemaic Alexandria, 300–100 BC

The scene of this mime is Alexandria, and the chief characters are two fellow-countrywomen of the author. Gorgo, paying a morning call, finds Praxinoa, with her two-year-old child, superintending the spinning of her maids, and asks her to come with her to the Festival of Adonis at the palace of Ptolemy II. Praxinoa makes some demur, but at last washes and dresses and sallies forth with her visitor and their two maids. After sundry encounters in the crowded streets, they enter the palace, and soon after, the prima donna begins the Dirge—which is really a wedding-song containing a forecast of a dirge—with an address to the bride Aphrodite and a reference to the deification of the queen of Ptolemy I. The song describes the scene—the offerings displayed about the marriage-bed, the two canopies of greenery above it, the bedstead with its representation of the Rape of Ganymede, the coverlets which enwrap the effigies of Adonis and Aphrodite, the image of the holy bridegroom himself—and ends with an anticipation of the choral dirge to be sung on the morrow at the funeral of Adonis.

== Date ==
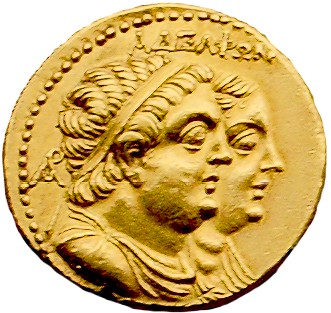
Gold octadrachm of Ptolemy II Philadelphus and Arsinoë II (obverse)

The festival is given by Arsinoë, wife and sister of Ptolemy Philadelphus, and according to Andrew Lang the poem cannot have been written earlier than his marriage, in c. 266 BC. Theocritus is believed to have had a model for this idyll in the Isthmiazusae of Sophron, an older poet. In the Isthmiazusae two ladies described the spectacle of the Isthmian games.

== Appraisal ==
According to Lang, "Nothing can be more gay and natural than the chatter of the women, which has changed no more in two thousand years than the song of birds." Michael Lambert, contrariwise, thinks the "prattling" of these Syracusan "tourists" was intended as light satire.

== See also ==
- Sanctuary of Arsinoe Aphrodite at Cape Zephyrion

== Sources ==
- Lambert, Michael (2001). "Gender and Religion in Theocritus, 'Idyll' 15: Prattling Tourists at the 'Adonia'". Acta Classica. 44: 87–103.
- Whitehorne, John (1995). "Women's Work in Theocritus, Idyll 15". Hermes. 123 (1): 63–75.

Attribution:

- Edmonds, J. M., ed. (1919). The Greek Bucolic Poets (3rd ed.). William Heinemann. pp. 175–95.
- Lang, Andrew, ed. (1880). Theocritus, Bion, and Moschus. London: Macmillan and Co. pp. 72–80.
