= Florentina =

Florentina can refer to:

- Saint Florentina, Spanish saint
- Andreea Florentina Grigore, a Romanian artistic gymnast
- Florentina Bunea, Romanian statistician
- Florentina Holzinger (born 1986), Austrian choreographer, director and performance artist
- Florentina Marincu, Romanian track and field athlete
- Florentina Mosora, Romanian and Belgian biophysicist
- Florentina Nedelcu, Romanian female volleyball player
- Florentina Spânu, Romanian football player
- Mother Ascensión Nicol Goñi, also known as Florentina Nicol Goñi
- 321 Florentina, an asteroid
- Littera Florentina
- A Latin adjectival form for the city of Florence
- Malus florentina, a species of Malus (apple)
- Florentina, a fictional town in Sacred videogame.

== See also ==
- Florentin (disambiguation)
- Florentine (disambiguation)
