= Florentinus Gregorius Winarno =

Florentinus Gregorius Winarno was born in Klaten, Indonesia on 15 February 1938. He was chairman of Codex Alimentarius Commissions. He is also acknowledged as Father of Food Science and Technology of Indonesia.
