= Florentine =

Florentine most commonly refers to:

- a person or thing from:
  - Florence, a city in Italy
  - Republic of Florence or the Florentine Republic
- the Florentine dialect of Italian or Tuscan language

Florentines frequently refers to:

- Masters of Florentine painting (14th-16th centuries)
- Florence dwellers

Florentine may also refer to:

== Places ==
- Florentin, Tel Aviv, a neighborhood in the southern part of Tel Aviv, Israel
- Leone, Florentine and Carpathia Apartment Buildings, an historic property in Omaha
- Upper Florentine Valley, a region in Tasmania

== People ==
- Gertie Florentine Marx (1912-2004), German-born American physician
- Isaac Florentine (born 1958), Israeli film director and martial artist
- Jim Florentine (born 1964), American comedian
- Mary Florentine, American psychologist
- Florentine Rost van Tonningen (1914–2007), Dutch National Socialist

== Film and television ==
- Florentine (film), a 1937 Austrian film
- The Florentine (film), a 1999 American film
- Florentine (TV series), an Israeli television drama series

== Food ==
- Florentine (culinary term), a dish prepared with spinach and a creamy sauce
- Florentine biscuit, an Italian pastry of nuts and fruit
- Bistecca alla fiorentina or Florentine steak, a preparation of thick T-bone steak, usually served rare

== Other uses ==
- Florentine Diamond, a diamond of Indian origin owned by the House of Habsburg
- Florentine flogging, a BDSM practice

== See also ==
- Florentin (disambiguation)
- Florentina (disambiguation)
