= Theriaca (poem) =

Ancient Greek poem

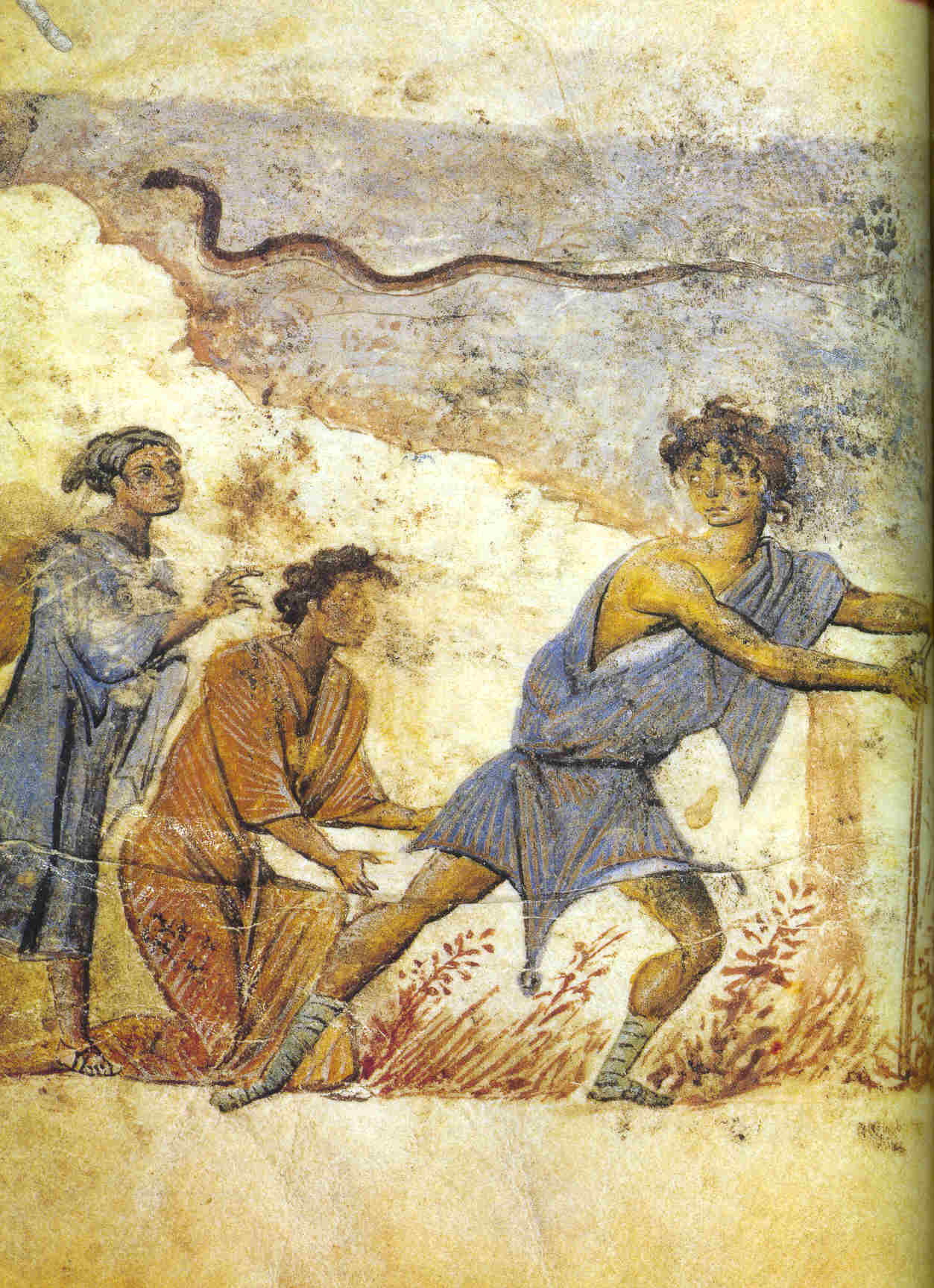

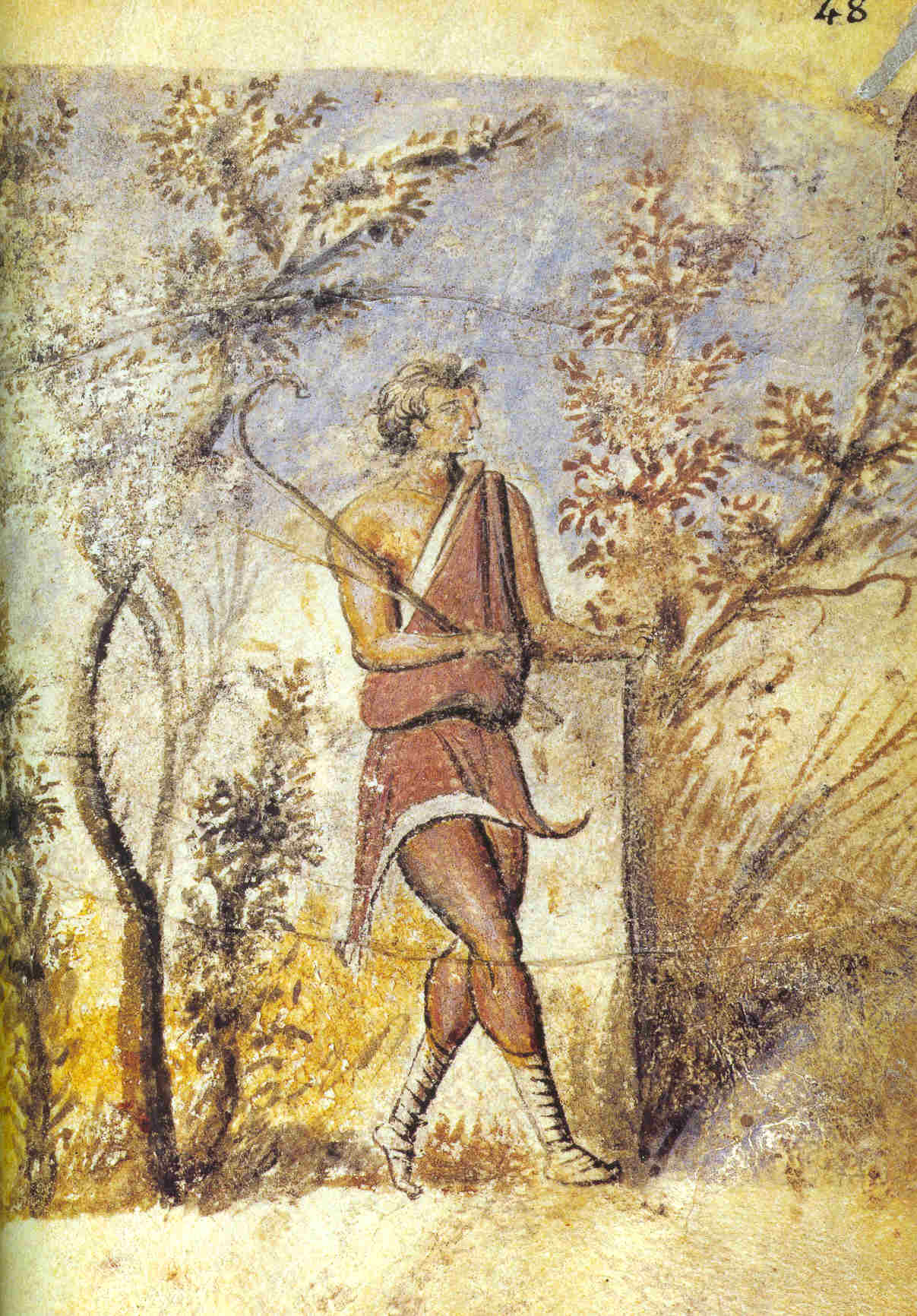

The Theriaca (Ancient Greek: Θηριακά) is the longest surviving work of the 2nd-century BC Greek poet Nicander of Colophon.

It is a 958-line hexameter poem describing the nature of venomous creatures, including snakes, spiders and scorpions, and the wounds that they inflict.

Nicander also wrote the companion work Alexipharmaca, which explored other poisons and venoms.

== Etymology ==
The title is the Latinized form of the Greek neuter plural adjective θηριακά (thēriaka), "having to do with venomous animals", which in turn derives from Ancient Greek: θηρίον (thērion), "wild animal". A corresponding English noun, theriac, also exists.

== Content ==
It has been noted that Theriaca is a poem not solely concerned with its intended subject matter, given its "arcane language". Nicander makes references to a drakōn, however it is likely this term is utilized to refer to an Aesculapian snake rather than a dragon in the contemporary perception of the word.
