= Florentin =

Florentin or Florentín (from Latin Florentinus) can be a given name or surname. It is found as a given name among Romanian, German, French and Spanish speakers. The latter also use it as a surname.

== People ==
=== Given name ===
- Florentin Crihălmeanu (born 1959), Romanian bishop of the Greek-Catholic Church
- Florentin Cruceru (born 1981), Romanian football midfielder
- Florentin Dumitru (born 1977), Romanian footballer
- Florentín Giménez (1925–2021), Paraguayan composer
- Florentin Matei (born 1993), Romanian footballer
- Florentin Petre (born 1976), Romanian footballer
- Florentin Pogba (born 1990), French-Guinean football defender

=== Surname ===
- Derlis Florentín (1984–2010), Paraguayan footballer
- Lorenzo Álvarez Florentín (1926–2014), Paraguayan composer and violinist

== Places ==
- Florentin, Tel Aviv, a neighborhood in the southern part of Tel Aviv
- Florentin, Tarn
- Florentin, Vidin Province, a village in Vidin Province, Bulgaria
- Florentin, Seychelles, an island in Poivre Atoll, Seychelles

== See also ==
- Florentina (disambiguation)
- Florentine (disambiguation)
