= Catullus 64 =

Latin poem by Catullus

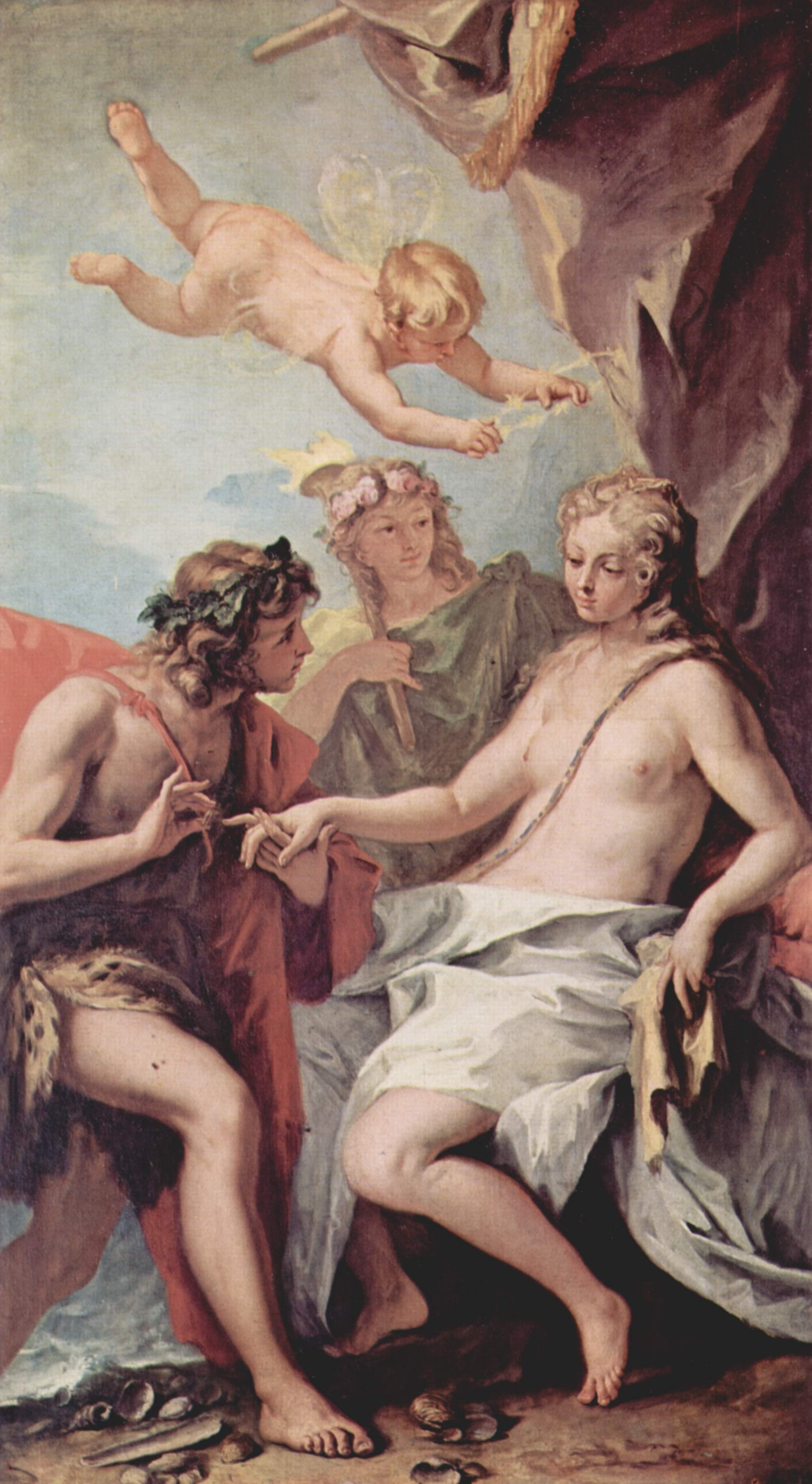
Ariadne being discovered by Dionysos on the island of Naxos, where she was abandoned by Theseus after helping him kill the Minotaur. Ariadne is being crowned with stars, corresponding to the constellation Corona ("crown").

Catullus 64 is an epyllion or "little epic" poem written by Latin poet Catullus. Catullus' longest poem, it retains his famed linguistic witticisms while employing an appropriately epic tone.

Though ostensibly concerning itself with the marriage of Peleus and the sea-nymph Thetis (parents of the famed Greek hero Achilles), a sizeable portion of the poem's lines is devoted to the desertion of Ariadne by the legendary Theseus. Although the poem implies that Theseus and Ariadne were in love, in reality the text never explicitly states that Theseus even looked at Ariadne. Told through ecphrasis, or the depiction of events on inanimate objects, the bulk of the poem details Ariadne's agonized solace. Her impassioned vituperations and eventual discovery by the wine-god Bacchus are some of the included plot events.

The poem relies heavily on the theme of nostalgia as Catullus reflects on what he believes are better times in Roman history. He wrote the poem during a time of civil war in Rome, even referencing brothers' blood being drenched in brothers' blood in line 399. He looks back on the wedding of Peleus and Thetis as a time where Gods may come to a wedding, unlike the modern times he lived in.

The poem is written in dactylic hexameter, the meter of epic poetry, such as Homer's Iliad and Odyssey and Virgil's Aeneid.

The work is often cited as Catullus' masterpiece, with Charlotte Higgins considering it one of the greatest literary works ever written.

== Bibliography ==
- DeBrohun, J (1999). "Ariadne and the whirlwind of fate: figures of confusion in Catullus 64.149-57". Classical Philology. 94 (4): 419–430. doi:10.1086/449456. S2CID 162274099.
- Faber, Riemer (1998). "Vestis...variata (Catullus 64, 50-51) and the Language of Poetic Description". Mnemosyne. 51 (2): 210–215. doi:10.1163/1568525982611641.
- Tathan, G (1990). "Ariadne's mitra: a note on Catullus 64.1-4". Classical Quarterly. 40 (2): 560–561. doi:10.1017/S0009838800043196. S2CID 170373084.
- Thomas, R (1983). "Callimachus, the Victoria Berenices, and Roman Poetry" (PDF). Classical Quarterly. 33: 92–113. doi:10.1017/S0009838800034327. S2CID 170886892.
- Duban, Jeffrey (1980). "Verbal Links and Imagistic Undercurrent in Catullus 64". Latomus. 39 (4): 778–800. JSTOR 41531939.
- Konstan, D (1977). Catullus' Indictment of Rome: The Meaning of Catullus 64. Amsterdam: Adolf M. Hakkert. ISBN 978-90-256-0742-5.
- Putnam, MCJ (1961). "The Art of C. 64". Harvard Studies in Classical Philology. 65. Harvard Studies in Classical Philology, Vol. 65: 166–205. doi:10.2307/310836. JSTOR 310836.
