= Nicander =

2nd century BC Greek scientist and poet

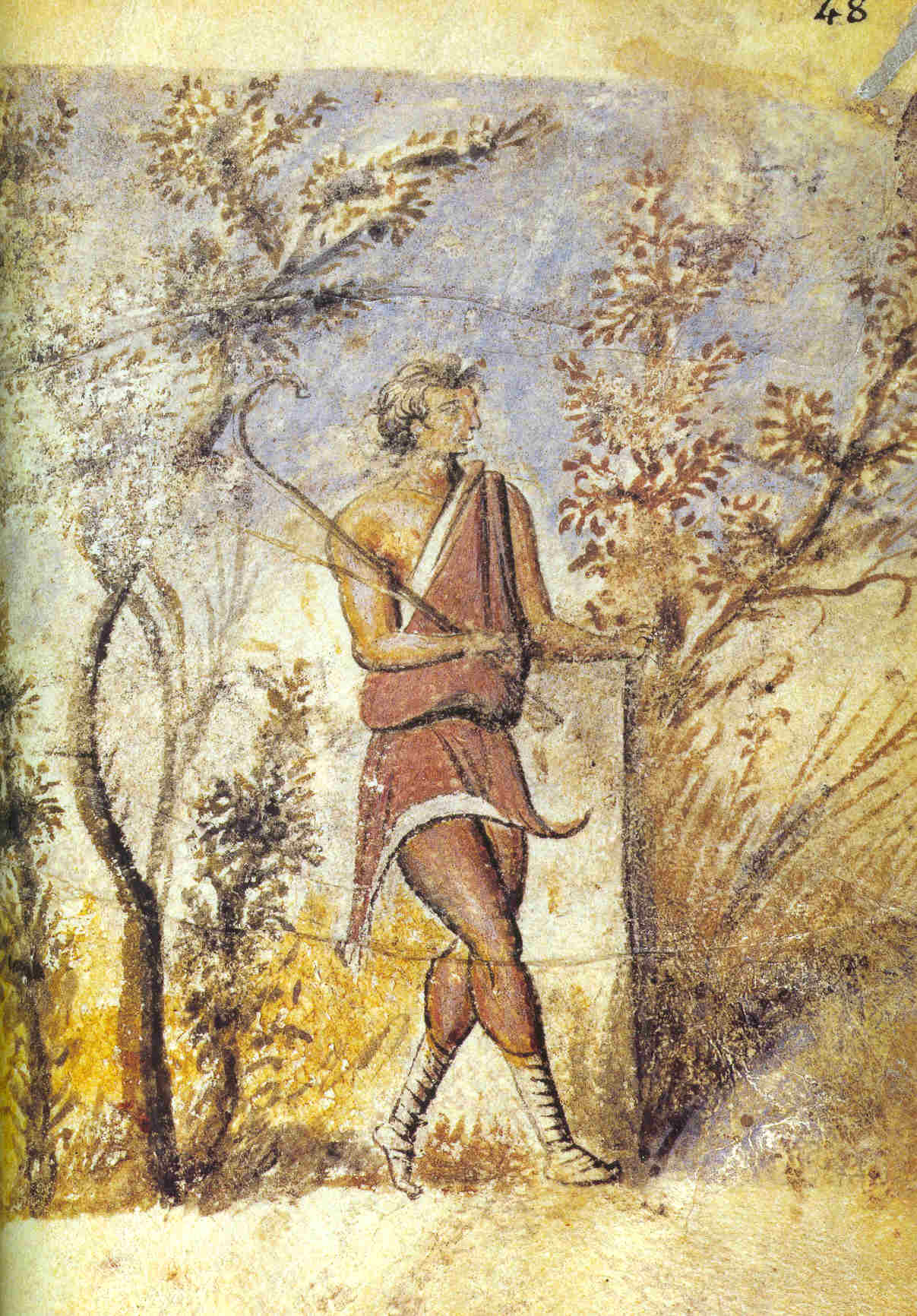
Nicander, Theriaca, 10th century, Constantinople

Nicander of Colophon (Ancient Greek: Νίκανδρος ὁ Κολοφώνιος, romanized: Níkandros ho Kolophṓnios; fl. 2nd century BC) was a Greek poet, physician, and grammarian.

The scattered biographical details in the ancient sources are so contradictory that it was sometimes assumed that there were two Hellenistic authors with the same name. He may have been born at Claros (Ahmetbeyli in modern Turkey), near Colophon, where his family is said to have held the hereditary priesthood of Apollo. The chronological indications range from the middle of the 3rd century BC until the late 2nd century BC.

He wrote a number of works both in prose and verse, of which two survive complete. The longest, Theriaca, is a hexameter poem (958 lines) on the nature of venomous animals and the wounds which they inflict. The other, Alexipharmaca, consists of 630 hexameters treating of poisons and their antidotes. Nicander's main source for medical information was the physician Apollodorus. (Note: Apollodorus, physician to a Ptolemy, was "likely enough" the same man as Apollodorus of Alexandria.) Among his lost works, Heteroeumena was a mythological epic, used by Ovid in the Metamorphoses and epitomized by Antoninus Liberalis; Georgica, of which considerable fragments survive, was perhaps imitated by Virgil.

The works of Nicander were praised by Cicero (De oratore, i. 16), imitated by Ovid and Lucan, and frequently quoted by Pliny and other writers (e.g., Tertullian in De Scorpiace, I, 1).

== List of works ==
=== Surviving poems ===
- Theriaca (Of Venomous Animals)
- Alexipharmaca
- Epigrams

=== Lost poems ===
- Cimmerii
- Europia
- Georgica ("Farming")
- Heteroeumena ("Metamorphoses")
- Hyacinthus
- Hymnus ad Attalum ("Hymn to Attalus")
- Melissourgica ("Beekeeping")
- Oetaica
- Ophiaca
- Sicelia
- Thebaica

=== Lost prose works ===
- Aetolica ("History of Aetolia")
- Colophoniaca ("History of Colophon")
- De Poetis Colophoniis ("On poets from Colophon")
- Glossae ("Difficult words")

== Bibliography ==
- Nicander ed. and tr. A. S. F. Gow, A. F. Scholfield. Cambridge: Cambridge University Press, 1953.
- Earlier editions by JG Schneider (1792, 1816); O. Schneider (1856) (with the Scholia).
- The Scholia (from the Göttingen manuscript) were edited by G. Wentzel, ed. (1892), "Die Göttinger Scholien zu Nikanders Alexipharmaka", Abhandlungen der Königlichen Gesellschaft der Wissenschaften in Göttingen (in German), vol. 48, Göttingen der dieterichschen Buchhandlung, pp. 131–226
- Malomud, Anna (2024). Der geographische Raum in den Werken des Nikander von Kolophon [Geographical space in the works of Nicander of Colophon] (in German). Tübingen: Mohr Siebeck. ISBN 978-3-16-162619-7.
- H. Klauser, "De Dicendi Genere Nicandri" (Dissertationes Philologicae Vindobonenses, vi. 1898).
- Nelson, Thomas J. (2020), "Nicander's Hymn to Attalus: Pergamene Panegyric'", Cambridge Classical Journal, 66: 182–202, doi:10.1017/S1750270519000083, S2CID 211927577
- W. Vollgraff, Nikander und Ovid (Groningen, 1909 ff.).
