= Butterfly Valley: A Requiem =

- Author: Inger Christensen
- Original title: Sommerfugledalen: Et requiem
- Translator: Susanna Nied
- Language: Danish
- Publisher: Brøndum
- Publication date: 1991
- Publication place: Denmark
- English publication date: 2001
- Pages: 35
- ISBN: 87-7385-197-3

Butterfly Valley: A Requiem (Danish: Sommerfugledalen: Et requiem) is a 1991 book of poetry by the Danish writer Inger Christensen. It consists of 15 sonnets and is a so-called sonnet redoublé.

== Publication ==
The book was published in Denmark in 1991 through Brøndum. In 2001, an English-language translation by Susanna Nied was released by the Dublin-based publisher Dedalus Press. It was published in the United States in 2004 through New Directions Publishing. Nied was a finalist for the 2005 American PEN Award for Poetry in Translation for the book; the motivation said that "the English text generates a motive force of formal presence. The reader doesn't merely acquire the ideas and the statements of the original, but does so by hearing a sustained and recognizable breath."

The work was chosen as one of 12 works of literature (most of them novels and plays) for the Danish Culture Canon. It has been set to music by two composers; first by Niels Rosing-Schow (1992), then by Svend Nielsen (1998, 2003). Both versions have been recorded by the Ars Nova Copenhagen choir; first Rosing-Schow's setting conducted by Bo Holten (1996), then the later Nielsen setting conducted by Tamas Veto (2007).

== See also ==
- 1991 in poetry
- Danish literature
