= Ove Jørgensen =

Danish classical scholar (1877–1950)

- In Constantinople during his travels with Carl Nielsen, May 1903
- Born: 5 September 1877; Copenhagen, Denmark
- Died: 31 October 1950 (aged 73); Freeport of Copenhagen
- Burial place: Holmen Cemetery, Copenhagen
- Known for: Jørgensen's law
- Father: Sophus Mads Jørgensen

Academic background
- Education: Metropolitanskolen, Copenhagen
- Alma mater: University of Copenhagen

Academic work
- Discipline: Classical scholarship
- Sub-discipline: Homeric poetry
- Notable works: "The Appearances of the Gods in Books 9–12 of the Odyssey" (1904) (Note: German: Das Auftreten der Goetter in den Buechern ι–μ der Odyssee. (Note: Jørgensen uses the traditional Greek numbering system, by which books of the Odyssey are designated by lower-case Greek letters, and those of the Iliad are designated in upper case. See Dickey 2007, p. 132.))
- Influenced: Martin P. Nilsson

Ove Jørgensen (Danish pronunciation: [ˈoːvə ˈjœˀnsən]; 5 September 1877 – 31 October 1950) was a Danish scholar of classics, literature and ballet. He formulated Jørgensen's law, which describes the narrative conventions used in Homeric poetry when relating the actions of the gods.

The son of Sophus Mads Jørgensen, a professor of chemistry, Jørgensen was born and lived for most of his life in Copenhagen. He was educated at the prestigious Metropolitanskolen and at the University of Copenhagen, where he began his study of the Homeric poems. In 1904, following academic travels to Berlin, Athens, Italy and Constantinople, he published "The Appearances of the Gods in Books 9–12 of the Odyssey", an article in which he outlined the distinctions in the poem between how the actions of deities are described by mortal characters and by the narrator and gods. The principles he set out became known as "Jørgensen's law".

Jørgensen gave up professional classical scholarship in 1905, following a dispute with other academics after he was not invited to join a newly formed learned society. He had intended to publish a monograph based on his 1904 article, but it never materialised. Instead, he devoted himself to teaching, both at schools and at the University of Copenhagen: among his students were the future poet Johannes Weltzer and Poul Hartling, later Prime Minister of Denmark. He maintained a lifelong friendship and correspondence with the composer Carl Nielsen and his wife, the sculptor Anne Marie Carl-Nielsen.

Jørgensen published on the works of Charles Dickens, identified artworks for the National Gallery of Denmark, and was a recognised authority on ballet. His views on the latter were conservative and nationalistic, promoting what he saw as authentic, masculine Danish aesthetics – represented by the ballet master August Bournonville – against modernist, liberalising innovations from Europe and the United States. He wrote critically of the American dancers Isadora Duncan and Loïe Fuller, but was later an advocate of the Russian choreographer Michel Fokine.

== Early life and education ==
Ove Jørgensen was born in Copenhagen on 5 September 1877. He was the son of Sophus Mads Jørgensen, a professor of chemistry at the University of Copenhagen, and his wife, Louise (née Wellmann). In a 1950 obituary, Peter P. Rohde described Jørgensen's upbringing as a "strict school", and wrote that his father had intended him for an academic career. Jørgensen became a student at the prestigious Metropolitanskolen in 1895. (Note: Hartmann 2011. On the Metropolitanskolen, see Barnett 2022, p. 155; Damsholt 2011, p. 214.) In the same year, he made his first visit to Berlin, where he visited the Kaiser-Friedrich-Museum: his student and biographer Thure Hastrup credits this experience with beginning his "love affair" with art. In 1898, Jørgensen visited Verona, Venice and Siena with his brother Einar, where he studied renaissance art, particularly the works of Lorenzo Lotto and Antonio da Correggio.

Jørgensen received his Master of Arts degree from Copenhagen in 1902, submitting a thesis in which he argued for the single authorship of the Homeric poems, (Note: Hartmann 2011. On the Metropolitanskolen, see Barnett 2022, p. 155; Damsholt 2011, p. 214.) based on Book 13 of the Odyssey. His university teachers included the historian Johan Ludvig Heiberg and the philologist Anders Bjørn Drachmann. (Note: Hartmann 2011. On the Metropolitanskolen, see Barnett 2022, p. 155; Damsholt 2011, p. 214.) The classical scholar Jørgen Mejer considers Jørgensen among the best classicists to have studied under them.

== Classical scholarship ==
Otherwise, here in Berlin v. W. is the absolutely infallible pope, and the archaeologists in particular always mention his name with a sacred shudder, but pronounce his results with stentorian voices. I should like to know their reaction when he declares: „Ja, so glaubte ich noch Oktober 1902" (Note: "Yes, that is what I still believed in October 1902".) – whether the whole train will then turn around with him – without batting an eyelid. αἰσχρὰ τά γ' ὀφθαλμοῖς καὶ νεμεσητὰ ἰδεῖν. (Note: "These are shameful sights and bring indignation to behold", a line by the ancient Spartan poet Tyrtaeus.)

—Letter from Jørgensen to Heiberg, November 1902

Following his graduation from Copenhagen, Jørgensen travelled to Berlin, where he spent the 1902–1903 academic year studying Homeric poetry under the philologists Ulrich von Wilamowitz-Moellendorff and Hermann Alexander Diels. (Note: Hartmann 2011. For the dates, see Mejer 1984, p. 520.) In a letter of November 1902 to Heiberg, Jørgensen called himself "Wilamowitz-intoxicated", having "almost daily" studied his writings over several years, though later that month he described one of Wilamowitz's seminars as "a complete farce" and an exercise in "throwing a discus in [his] own glass house". (Note: Specifically, Jørgensen criticised Wilamowitz for conducting the seminar largely in Latin, exposing what Jørgensen considered to be the poor Latin skills of his students.) In Berlin, he began the process of writing what became his 1904 article on the invocation of the gods in the Odyssey.

Jørgensen travelled to Athens in the spring of 1903, funded by a government stipendium of 450 kroner (equivalent to 35,000 kr., or $5,000, in 2022), with his fellow Copenhagen student, the future archaeologist Frederik Poulsen. There he met the painter Marie Henriques and was a neighbour of the composer Carl Nielsen and his wife, the sculptor Anne Marie Carl-Nielsen. He became a lifelong friend of the couple, and accompanied them on a sightseeing tour to Constantinople in May 1903: (Note: Poulsen 2023, search: "Ove Jørgensen"; Nielsen 2022, search: "Ove Jørgensen".) Carl Nielsen mentions him sixty-three times in his diary. Jørgensen's visits to classical sites included a visit to Troy guided by its excavator, Wilhelm Dörpfeld, and with Dörpfeld to the island of Leukas, which the latter believed to be the location of Homer's Ithaca. In June 1903, Jørgensen and Nielsen travelled to Italy, visiting the sites of Magna Graecia, including Paestum and Pompeii, where Jørgensen attended eleven lectures from the site's excavator, August Mau. Jørgensen, Nielsen and Carl-Nielsen subsequently travelled to Rome, where Jørgensen cultivated an interest in Baroque art.

Jørgensen published "The Appearances of the Gods in Books 9–12 of the Odyssey", written in German, in the journal Hermes in 1904. In this article, Jørgensen observed that Homeric characters typically use generic terms, particularly θεός (theós, 'a god'), δαίμων ('a daimon') and Ζεύς ('Zeus'), to refer to the actions of gods, whereas the narrator and the gods themselves always name the specific gods responsible. This principle became known as Jørgensen's law, and the classicist Ruth Scodel described it in 1998 as the "standard analysis of ... the rules that govern human speech about the gods". It was particularly influential upon Martin P. Nilsson, who later published extensively on Greek religion. Jørgensen began work on a book-length treatment of his ideas, and wrote to Heiberg in February 1904 that he was working on an application of his work to the Iliad, but never published either. Later scholars nuanced the definition of Jørgensen's law: for instance, George Miller Calhoun observed in 1940 that the law does not apply to minor gods, nor when characters relate stories at second hand, nor when the deity involved is considered obvious because they are closely associated with the type of event that occurred. (Note: Calhoun 1940, p. 270. As an example of the latter circumstance, Artemis and Apollo are closely associated with unexplained, sudden death, and so are credited with causing this by mortal characters in both the Iliad and the Odyssey.)

In 1904, Jørgensen began to work as a teacher, taking a post at N. Zahle's School (a girls' school founded and led by Natalie Zahle) in Copenhagen at the instigation of Drachmann, for whom he had worked as a teaching assistant in October–November 1898. He took another in 1905 at the Østersøgade Gymnasium in the same city. He rejected professional academia in 1905, following a dispute with other classical scholars over the founding of the Greek Society for Philhellenes, (Note: Danish: Græsk selskab for filhellenere.) a Danish learned society founded by intellectuals including Heiberg, Harald Høffding and Georg Brandes in February of that year. Although most members were qualified as doctors of philosophy, others – including Nielsen – were invited. Jørgensen was not invited, which he considered a snub, and he refused the offer of Drachmann to introduce him to the society.

== Later career ==
Jørgensen continued to teach and publish upon the classical languages following his retreat from academic work. Among his students was the future Prime Minister of Denmark, Poul Hartling, who described Jørgensen as "the best teacher [he] ever had". Jørgensen taught an elementary Greek class for students of theology at the University of Copenhagen from 1915; Hartling studied there between 1932 and 1939. (Note: Hartling 2016, search "Ove Jørgensen". For Harling's dates at Copenhagen, see The International Year Book and Statesmen's Who's Who 1979, p. 307.) Jørgensen also taught the future poet Johannes Weltzer. Weltzer wrote in 1953 that Jørgensen's classes on Plato's Apologia, a philosophical work portraying the defence of Plato's teacher Socrates against charges of impiety, were "a matter of introducing [his students] into the Socratic way of life", and that he expected that few of those students would have forgotten them.

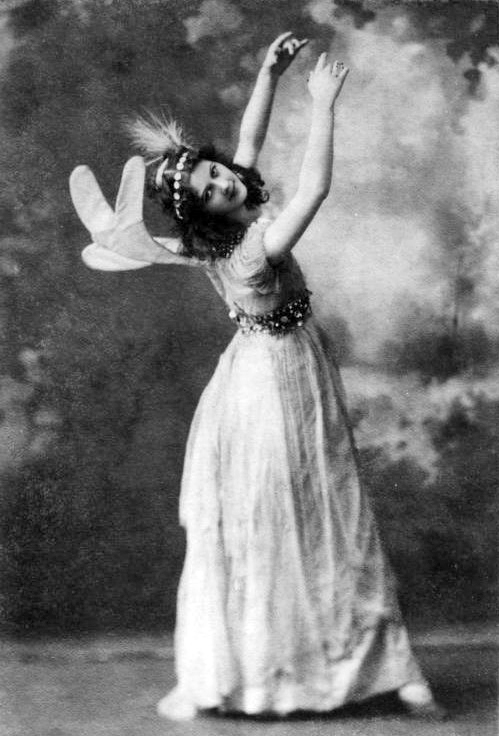
Isadora Duncan, whose dancing movements Jørgensen compared with those of a goose, performing in 1896

Jørgensen maintained his friendship and correspondence with Carl Nielsen, with whom he discussed Shakespeare. In a letter of 1916, Nielsen confided in him about his abortive efforts to write an opera based on The Tempest, as well as about the precarious state of his marriage. Jørgensen also corresponded with Anne Marie Carl-Nielsen: in 1922, she wrote to him that she had reconciled with Carl and determined to remain with him.

In March 1905, Jørgensen wrote to Anne Marie Carl-Nielsen that, following a period of "mental depression" caused by the affair with the Greek Society, he was working on "a little article" about ballet. (Note: Hastrup 1971, pp. 15–16. The article is Jørgensen 1905.) He became an authority on the subject, writing a series of essays in which he promoted what he saw as the traditional aesthetics of the Royal Danish Ballet. He asserted the importance of the Danish ballet master August Bournonville while criticising the innovations introduced into European dance by Isadora Duncan. Jørgensen called Duncan an "American dilettante", denigrated her as middle-aged and under-educated, (Note: Jørgensen wrote this in 1905, when Duncan was no older than twenty-eight.) and likened her dancing movements to those of a goose. He condemned the Art Nouveau- and symbolism-influenced style of Loïe Fuller, another American who, like Duncan, performed in Denmark in 1905, calling it "quasi-philosophical experiments". (Note: Jørgensen 1906, p. 511; Broad 2020, p. 425. For Fuller's links to symbolism and Art Nouveau, see Current & Current 1997, p. 4.) In March of the same year, he had attended a lecture by Vilhelm Wanscher, a philosopher and historian of art: Jørgensen described Wanscher's conception of the aesthetic perception of art as "a mental disorder".

The ballet scholar Karen Vedel has linked Jørgensen's opposition to Duncan, and the liberalising ideas of the Modern Breakthrough he felt she represented, to the ideology of the Danish national conservative movement. In particular, she draws attention to Jørgensen's promotion of what he saw as distinctively "Danish" ballet, and his characterisation of this as masculine and Dionysian, in contrast to his portrayal of Duncan's style as foreign, unartistic and iconoclastic. In 1905, Jørgensen wrote retrospectively in praise of the reforms introduced by Hans Beck when the latter took over the Royal Danish Ballet in 1894. Beck had insisted that male pupils adopt what he considered a more "manly" style of dance; Jørgensen considered that this reasserted the correct distinction between the "flaming power and appeal of the steel-strong male body" and the "more voluptuous and graceful suppleness of the female". (Note: Vedel 2011, pp. 129–130, quoting Jørgensen 1905, p. 304.) Jørgensen's nationalistic ideas about ballet softened over time: in 1908, he gave a positive review of a performance of the Russian ballerina Anna Pavlova with dancers from the Mariinsky Theatre, while in 1918 he recommended that the Russian choreographer Michel Fokine be hired by the Royal Danish Theatre. In the same year, he defended Fokine against accusations that his artistic style was revolutionary in character and connected with Bolshevism.

In 1913, Drachmann wrote to Jørgensen, unsuccessfully trying to persuade him to resume his work on classical scholarship. Jørgensen's father, Sophus, died in 1914. In 1916, alongside the chemist S. P. L. Sørensen, he completed and published Sophus's unfinished manuscript of Development History of the Chemical Concept of Acid until 1830. (Note: Danish: Det kemiske Syrebegrebs Udviklingshistorie indtil 1830.) Jørgensen's other scholarly interests included the English novelist Charles Dickens: Hartling later wrote that Jørgensen could easily have been a professor of his work. Jørgensen edited a 1930 Danish edition of Dickens's novel Great Expectations, to which he added an introductory essay. The literary scholar Jørgen Erik Nielsen later praised the essay as displaying an extensive knowledge both of Dickens and of related literature and criticism. Jørgensen once identified the subject-matter of two history paintings by the sixteenth-century artist Salvator Rosa, held by the National Gallery of Denmark, by reference to an obscure verse of late-antique Latin poetry. Around 1920, he made an identification of a painting of the Virgin Mary, also in the National Gallery, as a work of the Master of Flémalle.

== Assessment and personal life ==
The writer and opera singer Francis Lasson has identified Jørgensen, alongside figures such as Wanscher, the writer Sophus Claussen and the pianist Henrik Knudsen, as part of "a new golden age in the Danish spirit". (Note: Lasson 1984, p. 191, quoted in Vorre 2007.) Rohde named him, alongside Frederik Poulsen, as one of Denmark's most distinguished classicists. Poulsen, who knew Jørgensen in Copenhagen and Berlin and accompanied him to Athens, described him as "a quiet, reticent student" and a "remarkable man", whom he compared with Socrates. Vedel has named Jørgensen as an important cultural critic of his period. Quoting the Latin poet Juvenal, Jørgensen wrote in 1938 that all his writings on ballet had stemmed from anger at others' misunderstanding of the art. (Note: Facit indignatio versum ('Frustration composes my poetry'), a quote from Juvenal's Satires 1.79.)

Poul Hartling described Jørgensen as looking like "what a professor ... should look like according to the clichés: scruffy-stubble full beard, thin-rimmed glasses, knee flaps and button-downs". He portrayed Jørgensen's lessons as "steeped in humour", particularly Jørgensen's taste for acerbic, sarcastic comments at the expense of students who arrived late or whom he perceived to be slacking – which sometimes included Hartling. His students referred to him by the Latin title of "the magister" ('master'). Hastrup wrote that Jørgensen had lived his life by the advice given to him by Drachmann, upon his appointment at N. Zahle's School in 1904, to "always give his students the best that he had". In 1914, Jørgensen wrote to Natalie Zahle that teaching had been both the happiest and most successful aspect of his life; in November 1920, he wrote to Marie Henriques that, if he were hit on the head by a roof tile, he would "go to the crematorium an infinitely happy man" on account of his teaching. According to Rohde, he was in the habit of walking from Copenhagen to the resort town of Hornbæk – a distance of around 50 kilometres (31 mi) – and back again.

Jørgensen never married. He maintained his respect for his former teacher Wilamowitz until the First World War, writing what Mejer has termed "a virtual eulogy" of him in a Danish newspaper when Wilamowitz lectured at the University of Copenhagen in 1910, though after the war he became, in Mejer's terms, "irreconcilably opposed to things and persons German". Jørgensen died in the Freeport of Copenhagen on 31 October 1950; in his later years, he suffered from ill-health, which prevented him from working, and from financial hardship. He was buried in Copenhagen's Holmen Cemetery. Rohde wrote that he was, by this time, a little-known figure, citing Jørgensen's aversion to publicity and reluctance to put his scholarship into print.

== Selected works ==
=== As author ===
- Jørgensen, Ove (1904). "Das Auftreten der Goetter in den Buechern ι–μ der Odyssee" [The Appearances of the Gods in Books 9–12 of the Odyssey]. Hermes (in German). 39 (3): 357–382. JSTOR 4472953.
- — (1904–1905). "En ny Strømning i den højere Homerkritik" [A New Current in the Higher Homeric Criticism]. Nordisk Tidsskrift for Filologi [Nordic Journal of Philology] (in Danish): 1–21.
- — (1905). "Balletens Kunst" [The Art of Ballet]. Tilskueren [The Spectator] (in Danish). 22: 338–348.
- — (1906). "Duncan kontra Bournonville" [Duncan Against Bournonville]. Tilskueren [The Spectator] (in Danish). 23: 511–520.
- — (1911). "Ἀλεξάνδρου ἀριστεία" [The Aristeia of Alexandros]. Nordisk Tidsskrift for Filologi [Nordic Journal of Philology] (in Danish): 1–47.
- — (1914). Aischylos' Perserdrama som historisk Kildeskrift [Aeschylus's Persians Play as a Historical Source]. Studier fra Sprog- og Oldtidsforskn [Series on Language and Ancient Studies] (in Danish). Vol. 94. Copenhagen: Kleins Frolag. OCLC 474770591.
- — (1918). "Fokin kontra Bournonville" [Fokine Against Bournonville]. Tilskueren [The Spectator] (in Danish).
- — (1922). "Homerlitteratur" [Literature on Homer]. Tilskueren [The Spectator] (in Danish).
- — (1925). "Apologetisk Homerkritik" [Apologetic Homeric Criticism]. Nordisk Tidsskrift for Filologi [Nordic Journal of Philology] (in Danish): 1–25.
- — (1971). Krabbe, Henning (ed.). Udvalgte Skrifter: Ballet, Klassik, Litteratur, Kunst [Collected Writings: Ballet, Classics, Literature, Art] (in Danish). Copenhagen: Thaning & Appel. ISBN 8741344405.

=== As editor ===
- Jørgensen, Sophus Mads (1916). Sørensen, S. P. L.; Jørgensen, Ove (eds.). Det kemiske Syrebegrebs Udviklingshistorie indtil 1830 [Development History of the Chemical Concept of Acid until 1830] (in Danish). Copenhagen: Andr. Fred. Høst & Søn, Kgl. Hof-Boghandel. OCLC 874980879.
- Dickens, Charles (1930). Jørgensen, Ove (ed.). Store forventninger [Great Expectations] (in Danish). Copenhagen: Gyldendals bibliotek. OCLC 60963419.

== Works cited ==
- Barnett, Christopher P. (2022). Historical Dictionary of Kierkegaard's Philosophy. Lanham: Rowman & Littlefield Publishers. ISBN 9781538122624.
- Broad, Leah (2020). "Scaramouche, Scaramouche: Sibelius on Stage". Journal of the Royal Musical Association. 145 (2): 417–456. doi:10.1017/rma.2020.15. ISSN 1471-6933. S2CID 228974146.
- Calhoun, George M. (1940). "The Divine Entourage in Homer". The American Journal of Philology. 61 (3): 257–277. doi:10.2307/290932. ISSN 0002-9475. JSTOR 290932.
- Cook, Erwin F. (2018). The Odyssey in Athens: Myths of Cultural Origins. New York: Cornell University Press. doi:10.7591/9781501723506. ISBN 9781501723506 – via De Gruyter.
- Current, Richard Nelson; Current, Marcia Ewing (1997). Loie Fuller: Goddess of Light. Boston: Northeastern University Press. ISBN 9781555533090 – via Internet Archive.
- Damsholt, Nanna (2011). "Danish Folk High School and the Creation of a New Danish Man". In Werner, Yvonne Marie (ed.). Christian Masculinity: Men and Religion in Northern Europe in the 19th and 20th Centuries. Leuven University Press. pp. 213–232. ISBN 9789058678737. JSTOR ctt9qdxtn.
- Dickey, Eleanor (2007). Ancient Greek Scholarship: A Guide to Finding, Reading, and Understanding Scholia, Commentaries, Lexica, and Grammatical Treatises, from Their Beginnings to the Byzantine Period. Oxford University Press. ISBN 9780198042662 – via Oxford Academic.
- Diehl, Ernst (1925). Anthologia lyrica Graeca [Greek Lyric Anthology] (in Latin). Leipzig: Teubner. OCLC 6412538.
- Fanning, David; Assay, Michelle (2020). "Nielsen, Shakespeare and the Flute Concerto: From Character to Archetype" (PDF). Carl Nielsen Studies. 6: 68–93. doi:10.7146/cns.v6i0.122251 (inactive 12 July 2025). ISSN 2245-5809. S2CID 224957383 – via University of Manchester.
- Fjeldsøe, Michael (2010). "Carl Nielsen and the Current of Vitalism in Art". Carl Nielsen Studies. 4: 26–42. ISSN 2245-5809.
- Friis, Eva (1999). "Et opgør med Julius Lange: kunsthistorikeren Vilhelm Wanschers æstetiske kunstopfattelse" [A Showdown with Julius Lange: The Art Historian Vilhelm Wanscher's Aesthetic Perception of Art]. Viljen til det menneskelige: Tekster omkring Julius Lange [The Will to Humanity: Texts around Julius Lange] (in Danish). Copenhagen: Museum Tusculanum. pp. 233–255. ISBN 8772894547.
- Gerber, Douglas E., ed. (1999). Greek Elegiac Poetry: From the Seventh to the Fifth Centuries BC. Loeb Classical Library. Vol. 258. Translated by Gerber, Douglas E. Cambridge, MA: Harvard University Press. ISBN 0674995821 – via Loeb Classical Library.
- "Hartling, Poul". The International Year Book and Statesmen's Who's Who. Vol. 27. London: Burke's Peerage. 1979. ISSN 0074-9621.
- Hartling, Poul (2016) [1980]. Bladet i bogen: Erindringer 1914–1964 [The Leaf in the Book: Memoirs 1914–1964] (in Danish). Copenhagen: Lindhardt og Ringhof. ISBN 9788711661413.
- Hartmann, Godfred (18 July 2011). "Ove Jørgensen". Dansk Biografisk Leksikon [Danish Biographical Lexicon] (in Danish). Archived from the original on 10 August 2024.
- Hastrup, Thure (1971). "Ove Jørgensen". Udvalgte Skrifter: Ballet, Klassik, Litteratur, Kunst [Collected Writings: Ballet, Classics, Literature, Art]. By Jørgensen, Ove. Krabbe, Henning (ed.). (in Danish). Copenhagen: Thaning & Appel. pp. 7–19. ISBN 8741344405.
- Kauffman, George B. (1960). "Sophus Mads Jørgensen and the Werner–Jørgensen Controversy". Chymia. 6: 180–204. doi:10.2307/27757198. ISSN 0095-9367. JSTOR 27757198.
- Kauffman, George B. (1992). "Sophus Mads Jørgensen: A Danish Platinum Metals Pioneer". Platinum Metals Review. 36: 217–223. doi:10.1595/003214092X364217223. S2CID 267564679. Archived from the original (PDF) on 10 August 2024.
- Krabbe, Niels (2020). "Nielsen's Unrealised Opera Plans" (PDF). Carl Nielsen Studies. 6: 10–67. doi:10.7146/cns.v6i0.122249 (inactive 12 July 2025). ISSN 2245-5809. S2CID 225032852 – via University of Manchester.
- Larsen, Pelle Oliver (2016). Professoratet: kampen om Det Filosofiske Fakultet 1870–1920 [The Professorship: The Battle for the Philosophical Faculty 1870–1920] (in Danish). Copenhagen: Museum Tusculanums Forlag. ISBN 9788763543736.
- Lasson, Frans (1984). Sophus Claussen og hans kreds. En digters liv i breve [Sophus Claussen and His Circle: A Poet's Life in Letters] (in Danish). Vol. 2. Copenhagen: Gyldendal. ISBN 8700740624.
- Mejer, Jørgen (1984). "Wilamowitz and Scandinavia: Friendship and Scholarship". In Calder, William M.; Flashar, Helmut; Lindken, Theodor (eds.). Wilamowitz nach 50 Jahren [Wilamowitz after 50 Years]. Darmstadt: Wissenschaftliche Buchgesellschaft. pp. 513–537. ISBN 3-534-08810-7.
- Muntoni, Paolo (2019). "Simplicity and Essentiality: Carl Nielsen's Idea of Ancient Greek Music". Proceedings of the Danish Institute at Athens. 9: 55–70. doi:10.2307/j.ctv34wmvm0.6. ISSN 2241-9195.
- Nielsen, Carl (2022) [1891–1930]. Schousboe, Torben (ed.). Carl Nielsen – dagbøger og brevveksling med Anne Marie Carl-Nielsen [Carl Neilsen – Diaries and Correspondence with Anne Marie Carl-Nielsen] (in Danish). Vol. 1. Copenhagen: Lindhardt og Ringhof. ISBN 9788728102978.
- Nielsen, Jørgen Erik (2009). Dickens i Danmark (in Danish). Copenhagan: Museum Tusculanum. ISBN 9788763525947.
- Poulsen, Frederik (2023) [1947]. I det gæstfrie Europa. Liv og rejser indtil første verdenskrig [In the Hospitable Europe: Life and Travels Before the First World War] (in Danish). Copenhagen: Lindhardt og Ringhof. ISBN 9788728329900.
- Reynolds, Anne-Marie (2020). "Review: Carl Nielsen: Selected Letters and Diaries, Selected, Annotated and Translated by David Fanning and Michelle Assay, Copenhagen, Museum Tusculanum, 2017" (PDF). Carl Nielsen Studies. 6: 213–220. ISSN 2245-5809 – via University of Manchester.
- Rohde, Peter P. (10 November 1950). "Ove Jørgensen in Memoriam". Dagbladet Information (in Danish). p. 4.
- Scodel, Ruth (1998). "Bardic Performance and Oral Tradition in Homer". The American Journal of Philology. 119 (2): 171–194. doi:10.1353/ajp.1998.0027. ISSN 0002-9475. JSTOR 1562083. S2CID 161072518.
- Stokes, Sewell (10 September 2024). "Isadora Duncan". Encyclopaedia Britannica. Archived from the original on 14 September 2024.
- Vedel, Karen (2011). "'Female Nature', Body Culture and Plastique". In Carter, Alexandra; Fensham, Rachel (eds.). Dancing Naturally: Nature, Neo-Classicism and Modernity in Early Twentieth-Century Dance. Basingstoke: Palgrave Macmillan. pp. 124–138. ISBN 9780230278448.
- Vedel, Karen (2012). "Dancing Across Copenhagen". In van den Berg, Hubert; Hautamäki, Irmeli; Hjartarson, Benedikt; Jelsbak, Torben; Schönström, Rikard; Stounbjerg, Per; Ørum, Tania; Aagesen, Dorthe (eds.). A Cultural History of the Avant-Garde in the Nordic Countries 1900–1925. Leiden: Brill. pp. 511–528. ISBN 9789401208918.
- Vedel, Karen (2020). "Out and at Home". From Local to Global: Interrogating Performance Histories. Theatre Studies Department, Stockholm University. pp. 21–25. OL 50566771M.
- Vorre, Ida-Marie (1 January 2007). ""Som en mild og stille Sommerregn ...": Om Carl Nielsens bogsamling og hvad man kan lære deraf" ["Like a Mild and Quiet Summer Rain...": On Carl Nielsen's Book Collection and What Can Be Learned From It]. Museum Odense (in Danish). Archived from the original on 25 February 2024.
- Weltzer, Johannes (1953). De usandsynlige hverdage, en art levnedsbog [The Unlikely Weekdays: A Kind of Biography] (in Danish). Copenhagen: Nyt Nordisk Forlag. OCLC 13381955.
- West, Martin (1972). Iambi et elegi graeci ante Alexandrum cantati [Greek Iambics and Elegiacs Sung Before Alexander] (in Latin). Vol. 2. Oxford University Press. OCLC 56238707 – via Internet Archive.
