= Inger Christensen =

Danish poet, novelist, essayist, editor (1935–2009)

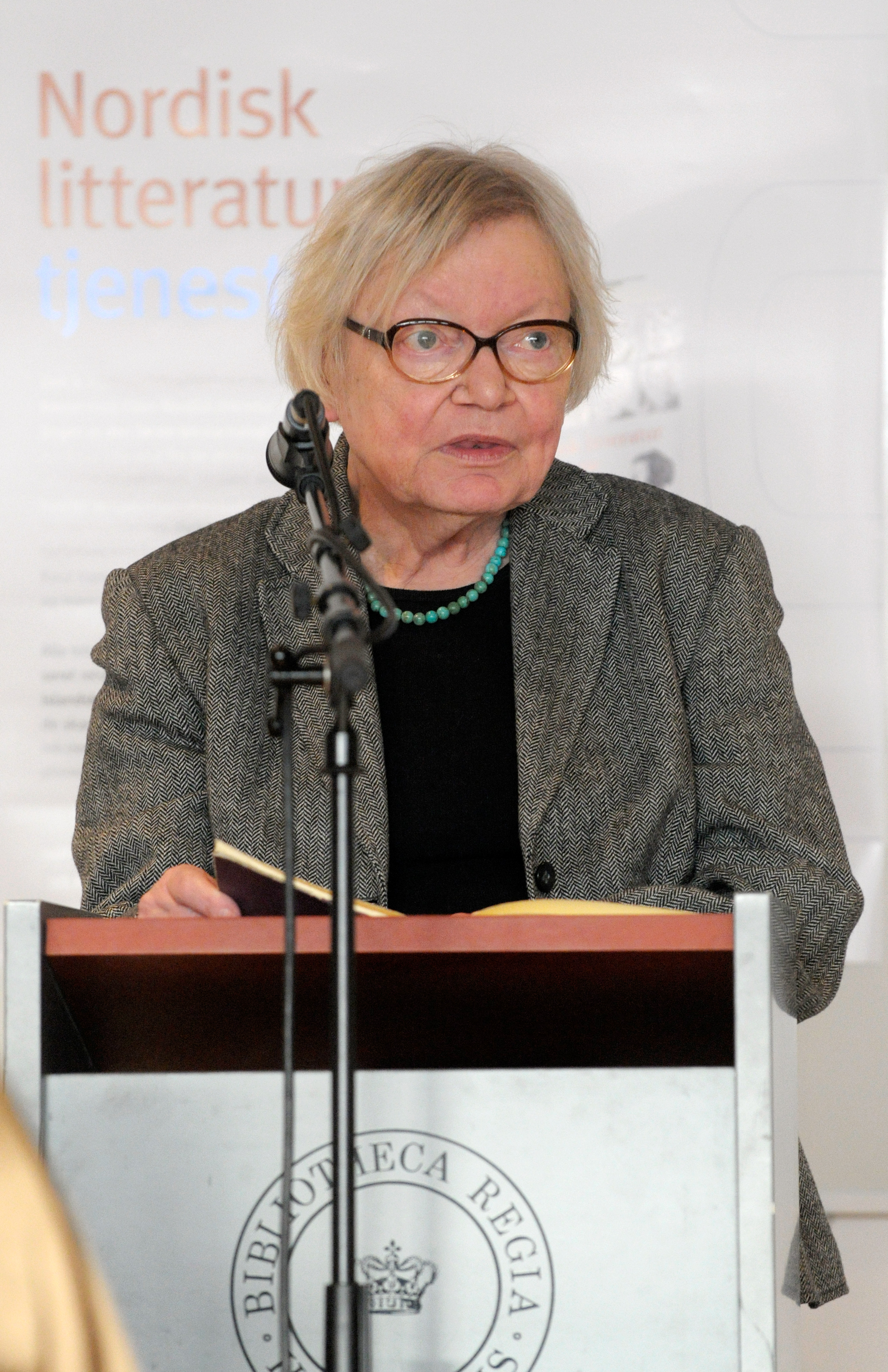
- Christensen in 2008
- Born: 16 January 1935; Vejle, Denmark
- Died: 2 January 2009 (aged 73); Copenhagen, Denmark
- Resting place: Garrison Cemetery, Copenhagen
- Occupations: Poet, novelist, essayist, editor
- Spouse: Poul Borum
- Children: Peter Borum
- Writing career
- Period: 1962–2000
- Notable awards: De Gyldne Laurbær (1969); Danish Critics Prize for Literature (1969); Swedish Academy Nordic Prize (1994); Austrian State Prize for European Literature (1994); Rungstedlund Award (2001)

Inger Christensen (16 January 1935 – 2 January 2009) was a Danish poet, novelist, essayist and editor. She is considered the foremost Danish poetic experimentalist of her generation.

== Life and work ==
Born in the town of Vejle, on the eastern Jutland coast of Denmark, Christensen's father was a tailor, and her mother a cook before her marriage. After graduating from Vejle Gymnasium, she moved to Copenhagen and, later, to Århus, studying at the Teachers' College there. She received her certificate in 1958. During this same period, Christensen began publishing poems in the journal Hvedekorn, and was guided by the noted Danish poet and critic Poul Borum (1934–1996), whom she married in 1959 and divorced in 1976.

After teaching at the College for Arts in Holbæk from 1963 to 1964, she turned to writing full-time, producing two of her major early collections, Lys (Light, 1962) and Græs (Grass, 1963), both examining the limits of self-knowledge and the role of language in perception. Her most acclaimed work of the 1960s, however, was It (Det), which, on one level, explored social, political and aesthetic issues, but more deeply probed large philosophical questions of meaning. The work, almost incantatory in tone, opposes issues such as fear and love and power and powerlessness.

In these years Christensen also published two novels, Evighedsmaskinen (1964) and Azorno (1967), as well as a shorter fiction on the Italian Renaissance painter Mantegna, presented from the viewpoint of various narrators (Mantegna's secretary Marsilio, the Turkish princess Farfalla, and Mantagena's young son), Det malede Værelse (1976, translated into English as The Painted Room by Denise Newman and published by Harvill Press in 2000).

Much of Christensen's work was organized upon "systemic" structures in accordance with her belief that poetry is not truth and not even the "dream" of truth, but "is a game, maybe a tragic game—the game we play with a world that plays its own game with us."

In the 1981 poetry collection Alfabet, Christensen used the alphabet (from a ["apricots"] to n ["nights"]) along with the Fibonacci mathematical sequence in which the next number is the sum of the two previous ones (0, 1, 1, 2, 3, 5, 8, 13, 21, 34...). As she explained: "The numerical ratios exist in nature: the way a leek wraps around itself from the inside, and the head of a snowflower, are both based on this series." Her system ends on the n, suggesting many possible meanings including "n's" significance as any whole number. As with It, however, despite its highly structured elements this work is a poetically evocative series concerned with oppositions such as an outpouring of the joy of the world counterposed with the fears for and forces poised for its destruction.

Sommerfugledalen of 1991 (Butterfly Valley: A Requiem, 2004) explores through the sonnet structure the fragility of life and mortality, ending in a kind of transformation.

Christensen also wrote works for children, plays, radio pieces, and numerous essays, the most notable of which were collected in her book Hemmelighedstilstanden (The State of Secrecy) in 2000.

== Awards and honors ==
In 1978, she was appointed to the Royal Danish Academy; in 1994, she became a member of the Académie Européenne de Poésie ("European Academy of Poetry"); in 2001, a member of the Academy of Arts, Berlin. She won the Grand Prix des Biennales Internationales de Poésie in 1991; She received the Rungstedlund Award in 1991. Der österreichische Staatspreis für Literature ("Austrian State Prize for European Literature") in 1994; in 1994, she won the Swedish Academy Nordic Prize, known as the 'little Nobel'; the European Poetry Prize in 1995; The America Award in 2001; the German Siegfried Unseld Preis in 2006; and received numerous other distinctions. Her works have been translated into several languages, and she was frequently mentioned as a candidate for the Nobel Prize in Literature.

== Works ==
Years link to corresponding "[year] in poetry" article for books of poems, or "[year] in literature" for other literary works:

- 1962: Lys: digte (Light: Poems), poems
- 1963: Græs: digte (Grass: Poems), poems
- 1964: Evighedsmaskinen, (The Eternity Machine), novel
- 1967: Azorno, novel (Azorno, translated into English by Denise Newman; New Directions, 2009)
- 1969: Det, poems (It, translated into English by Susanna Nied)
- 1972: Intriganterne (The Schemers), play
- 1976: Det malede værelse (The Painted Room: A Tale of Mantua, translated into English by Denise Newman; Harvill Press, 2000), novel
- 1979: Brev i april (Letter in April), poems
- 1979: Den historie der skal fortælles (The Story That Must Be Told), essays and texts
- 1981: Alfabet (Alphabet, translated into English by Susanna Nied), twice translated into Swedish, poems
- 1982: Del af labyrinten (Part of the Maze), essays
- 1982: Den store ukendte rejse (The Big Unknown Journey), children's book
- 1987: En vinteraften i Ufa og andre spil (A Winter Evening in Ufa and Other Plays), plays
- 1989: Digt om døden (Poem on Death), poem
- 1989: Lys og Græs (Light and Grass), poems
- 1990: Mikkel og hele menageriet (Mikkel and the Whole Menagerie), illustrated by Lillian Brøgger, children's book
- 1991: Sommerfugledalen, (Butterfly Valley: A Requiem, translated into English by Susanna Nied), sonnet sequence
- 1998: Samlede digte (Collected Poems)
- 2000: Hemmelighedstilstanden (The State of Secrecy), essays

=== Musical settings ===
The complete "Butterfly valley" has been set twice by two Danish composers, Niels Rosing-Schow and Svend Nielsen. Both versions were, separately, recorded by Ars Nova Copenhagen with poetry reading by the poet.
