= Hans Jakobsen =

Danish artistic gymnast

- Full name: Hans Hovgaard Jakobsen
- Born: 20 February 1895 Havrebjerg, Denmark
- Died: 17 October 1980 (aged 85) Odense, Denmark

Gymnastics career
- Discipline: Men's artistic gymnastics
- Country represented: Denmark
Medal record
Men's artistic gymnastics
Representing Denmark
Olympic Games
| Silver medal – second place | 1920 Antwerp | Team, Swedish system |

Hans Hovgaard Jakobsen (20 February 1895 in Havrebjerg, Denmark – 17 October 1980 in Odense, Denmark) was a Danish gymnast who competed in the 1920 Summer Olympics. He was part of the Danish team, which won the silver medal in the gymnastics men's team, Swedish system event in 1920.
