= Jørgensen's law =

Principle of Homeric narration

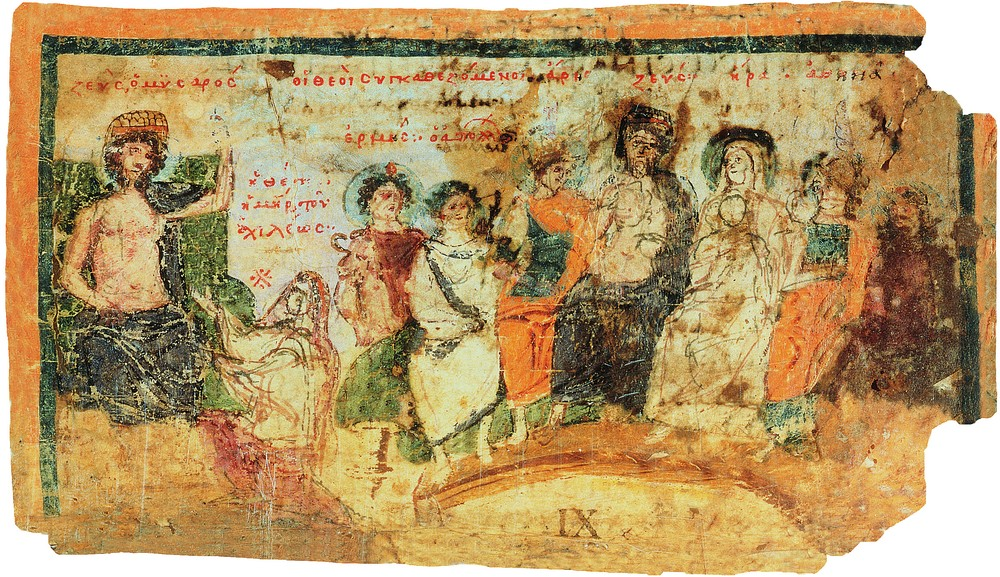
Illustration of the gods from the Ambrosian Iliad, a Homeric manuscript from the fifth century CE

Jørgensen's law (sometimes written as Jörgensen's law) is a principle of narration in Homeric poetry first proposed by the Danish classicist Ove Jørgensen in 1904. According to Jørgensen's law, mortal characters in the Homeric poems are generally unaware of the precise actions of the gods, unless possessed of special powers, and so attribute them generically to "the gods", Zeus, or generalised forces. The narrator and the gods themselves, meanwhile, invariably name the specific god involved, making the audience aware immediately of the true nature of divine action.

Jørgensen's law is not applied universally: it does not cover minor gods, nor legendary stories told by characters from outside their own experience. Since Jørgensen's proposal of the law, scholars have identified subtle distinctions in the way that the terms θεός (theos: 'a god'), δαίμων (daimon) and Ζεύς (Zeus), considered by Jørgensen to be interchangeable, are employed. However, Jørgensen's law is followed with few exceptions in both the Iliad and the Odyssey, and has been called the "standard analysis of ... the rules that govern human speech about the gods" by the classicist Ruth Scodel.

== Definition ==
The principle of Jørgensen's law traces to a 1904 article by the Danish classicist Ove Jørgensen, in which he proposed that characters in the Homeric poems typically use generic terms, particularly θεός (theos: 'a god'), δαίμων (daimon) and Ζεύς (Zeus), interchangeably to refer to the action of gods, whereas the narrator and the gods themselves always name the specific deities responsible:

Die Götter also, die in ι–μ die Handlung leiten, werden unter folgenden vier Benennungen erwähnt: θεός, δαίμων, θεοί, Ζεύς. Das sind aber in der conventionellen Sprache des Dichters nur vier Namen für dasselbe. Wenn z. B. die Bogensehne des Teukros birst, ist es für Teukros ein Daimon, der es gethan, für Aias aber ein Gott und für Hektor Zeus (O 468. 473. 489) ...

Nun ist es, wie schon Kayser bemerkt, nicht die gewöhnliche Art des Dichters, wenn es heisst: ‚Ein Gott schickte einen Hirsch‘; eine Wendung wie ‚Athene schickte einen Hirsch‘ würde uns viel natürlicher vorkommen...

The gods, therefore, who direct the action in Odyssey 9–12, (Note: Jørgensen uses the traditional Greek numbering system, by which books of the Odyssey are designated by lower-case Greek letters, and those of the Iliad are designated in upper case. See Dickey 2007, p. 132.) are known by the following four designations: θεός, δαίμων, θεοί, Ζεύς [a god, a daimon, gods, Zeus]. In the conventional language of the poet, however, these are simply four names for the same thing. When, for example, Teucer's bowstring breaks, for Teucer it is a daimon who did it, but for Ajax it is a god, and for Hector it is Zeus (Iliad 15.468, 473, 489) ...

Now, as Kayser has already noted, it is not the accustomed practice of the poet to say "a god sent a deer"; a phrase like "Athene sent a deer" would seem much more natural to us ...

—Jørgensen 1904, p. 363

Instead of understanding and articulating its supernatural origin, human beings affected by divine influence may perceive it as the action of their thumos (internal urges). In some cases, they also attribute divine action to the wrong god: Odysseus, for instance, blames Zeus for a storm which was earlier narrated to have been raised by Poseidon. (Note: De Jong 2010, p. 141; Odyssey 5.303–305.) Alternatively, characters may use the name of Zeus, or invoke the actions of the gods, rhetorically to refer to an event which appears without explanation.

Jørgensen's law sometimes requires a break with the usual narrative conventions of Homeric poetry: when an event is narrated twice, it is usual to employ the same wording and epic formulae, but observing Jørgensen's law requires variation when the same events are narrated by mortal characters and the narrator or the gods. The classicist Jenny Strauss Clay has suggested that it serves to emphasise the distinction between the omniscient narratorial voice, which is considered to be inspired by the divine Muses, and the comparative ignorance of the poems' mortal characters. By extension, it highlights that the passages of the Odyssey narrated by Odysseus himself are done so without the benefit of divine knowledge and detachment.

=== Antecedents ===
Jørgensen credited the German classicist Karl Ludwig Kayser with observing, in 1835, that Odysseus does not credit Athena with assisting him during the stories he tells to the Phaeacians during Odyssey 9–12, whereas she intervenes frequently on his behalf elsewhere in the poem. Kayser explained this inconsistency as a result of Odysseus's ignorance of which divine power had been acting during his experiences. Other classicists, such as Gregor Wilhelm Nitzsch in 1840 and Heinrich Düntzer in 1861, had used Odysseus's ignorance to explain the absence of Poseidon's anger from the same part of the poem: still others, such as Wilhelm Hartel in 1865 and Carl Rothe in 1882, had explained it as a narrative decision to focus on the anger of Helios, which had been immediately responsible for the shipwreck that led to Odysseus's arrival among the Phaeacians. (Note: Jørgensen 1904, pp. 357–362, citing among others Düntzer 1861, Nitzsch 1840, Rothe 1882 and Hartel 1865.)

== Application ==
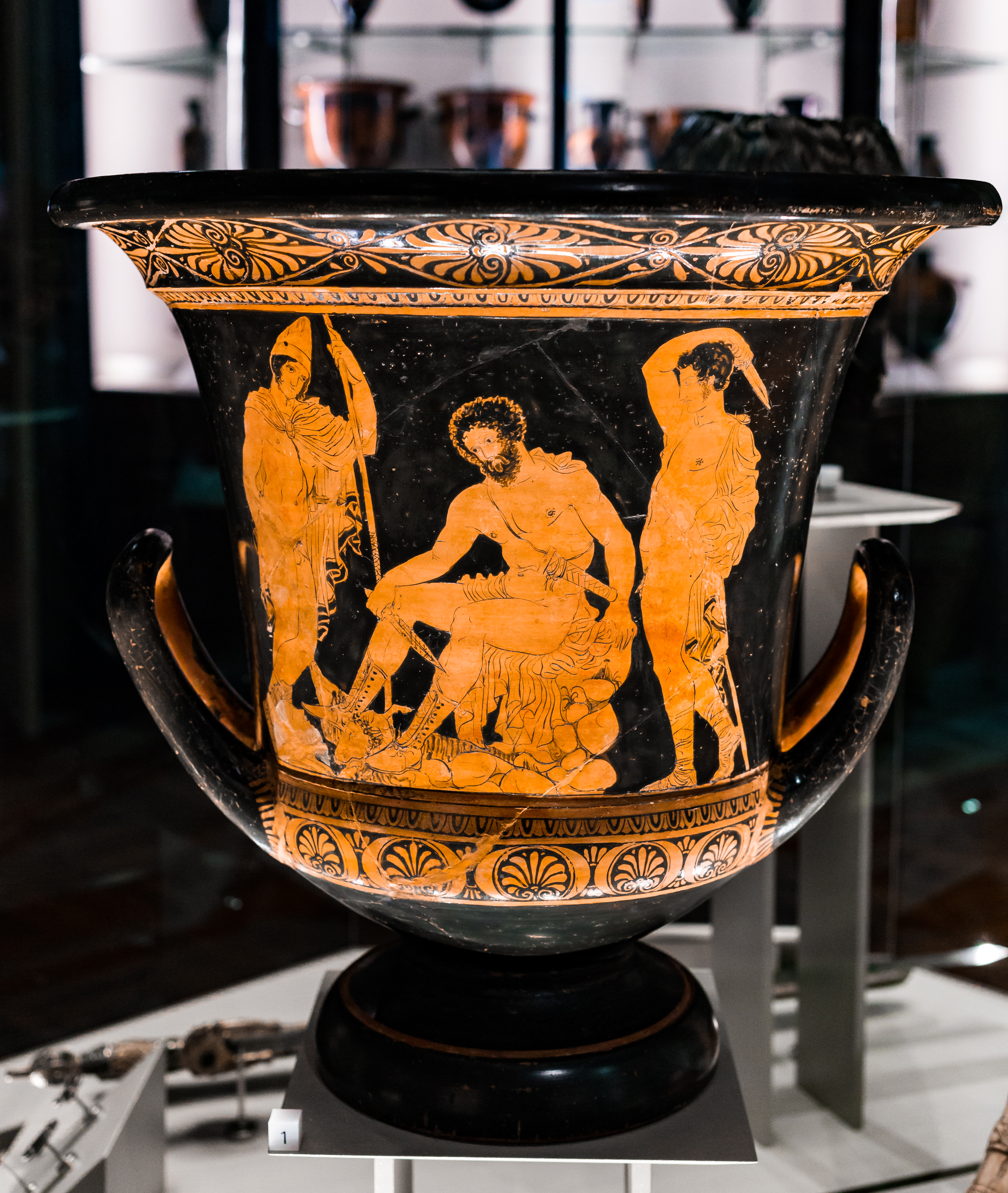
Odysseus consults the prophet Tiresias, on a vase painted c. 400 – c. 390 BCE. According to Jørgensen's law, Tiresias's special knowledge was required for Odysseus to learn the details of the gods' anger against him.

The classicist Ruth Scodel has described Jørgensen's article as the "standard analysis of ... the rules that govern human speech about the gods". Jørgensen originally made his observations upon books 9–12 of the Odyssey, where Odysseus uses all four of Jørgensen's terms, but only names a specific god (apart from making generic reference to Zeus) when he has since been informed of that god's actions by the goddess Calypso or the prophet Tiresias.

Jørgensen's law can be applied throughout the Odyssey: for instance, to the speech of the suitor Amphimedon in Odyssey 24, where he attributes the return of Odysseus to Ithaca to κακός ... δαίμων ('an evil daimon'). (Note: Cook 2018, p. 179; Odyssey 24.147–151.) Later in his speech, Amphimedon incorrectly credits Zeus, rather than Athena, with urging on Odysseus and Telemachus during their battle against the suitors. (Note: De Jong 2010, p. 572; Odyssey 24.161–164.) Other characters in the Odyssey, including Odysseus, recognise Athena's actions as the handiwork of a god, but are unable to identify her as the source. (Note: See e.g. Odyssey 7.286, 15.141–149, 22.429, 24.373–374 and 24.439–49, cited as examples of Jørgensen's law by De Jong.) During the false account Odysseus tells of his voyage to Ithaca to the swineherd Eumaeus in Odyssey 14, he follows Jørgensen's law nine times, attributing all divine action to "a god", "the gods" or to Zeus. (Note: De Jong 2010, p. 355; Odyssey 14.192–359.) It has also been applied to the Iliad: for instance, in Iliad 23, Idomeneus correctly reports that Eumelus has crashed his chariot in the race against Diomedes, Menelaus and Antilochus, but is unaware that Athena has caused the crash. (Note: Forte 2019, pp. 121–122: Iliad 23.465–468.)

Jørgensen's law has been used to explain apparent contradictions in the Odyssey, where Odysseus, as narrator, names Zeus as the originator of actions which the poet has previously described as the work of another god: under Jørgensen's principles, Odysseus's invocation of Zeus should be understood as a generic reference to divine action. Sometimes, mortal characters follow Jørgensen's law by attributing misfortunes to Zeus, even when they know that they are in fact the work of a different god. Telemachus, for instance, tells Penelope in Odyssey 1 that Zeus must be blamed for the suffering of the Greeks who fought at Troy, moments after hearing the bard Demodocus sing of how Athena had caused them. (Note: Cook 2018, p. 179: Odyssey 1.325–327; 346–349.)

The Homeric scholar Erwin F. Cook, while upholding the general validity of Jørgensen's observations, has questioned the interchangeability of Zeus with the other terms of reference, pointing out that Zeus is more often credited with responsibility for events involving fate and the weather. Cook argues that this reflects the early association of Zeus and his antecedent deities in pre-Greek culture with the heavens and storms. The classicist Irene de Jong has also suggested that daimon is more frequently associated with events perceived by the speaker as negative. Generally, the term daimon does not appear in the narratorial voice, though three exceptions exist in the Iliad. (Note: Brenk 1986, p. 2074: the three exceptions are at Iliad 3.420, 11.480 and 15.418.)

=== Exceptions ===
Jørgensen's law is not universally followed in Homeric poetry, though most apparent exceptions can be explained away or follow other conventions of Homeric narration. It does not apply to minor gods, such as Proteus, Eidothea, Circe, Aeolus and Calypso. Nor does it apply when characters relate legendary stories or those that they know at second hand, rather than retelling their own experiences. (Note: Calhoun 1940, p. 270: see e.g. Iliad 4.390, Iliad 6.135–137.) In certain cases, major deities are named when their actions are so characteristic of them as to be proof of their identity: for instance, Artemis and Apollo are closely associated with unexplained, sudden death, and so are credited with causing this by mortal characters in both the Iliad and the Odyssey. (Note: Calhoun 1940, p. 270: see e.g. Iliad 6.205, Odyssey 15.410–415.)

Odysseus's realisation that he has been addressed by the god Hermes in Odyssey 10 is unexplained, though Jørgensen's law would normally expect him to remain ignorant of Hermes's identity unless the god revealed it to him. (Note: De Jong 2010, p. 224, Currie 2016, p. 144, Brügger 2017, pp. 143, 211; Odyssey 10.275–309.) (Note: De Jong offers the possible explanations that Odysseus recognised Hermes's characteristic golden wand, or deduced his identity from the magical moly given to him by Hermes, which can only be harvested by the gods. Strauss Clay suggests that Hermes's words to Priam at Iliad 24.462–464 ("Nor will I come within Achilles's sight, for it would be a great cause for anger if an immortal god were to be openly entertained by mortals") indicate that some mortals are able to recognise him, and so that Odysseus's recognition does not break Jørgensen's law.) In Odyssey 3, Nestor breaks Jørgensen's law in giving a detailed account of how Zeus executed the wrath of Athena against the Greeks on their return from Troy. (Note: De Jong 2010, pp. 76–77; Odyssey 3.132–160.) Helen also breaks it in Odyssey 4, by naming Aphrodite as the cause of her infatuation with Paris; in the same book, Menelaus breaks it by crediting Athena with leading Helen away from the Trojan Horse. (Note: Calhoun 1940, p. 271; Odyssey 4.261–264 and 289.) In the Iliad, Jørgensen's law is broken during Nestor's description of the war between the Epeians and the Pylians, in which he participated: both Poseidon and Athena are identified as acting during the conflict. (Note: Calhoun 1940, p. 241; Iliad 15.714–761.) Calhoun suggests that the general observation of Jørgensen's law in tales told by characters from their own experience gives those tales an air of belonging to the present moment, and marks them as distinct from legends of the distant past, in which the appearance of the gods was more expected; conversely, he argues that Nestor's invocation of Athena and Poseidon lends "a tone of bombast" to his story.

== Bibliography ==
- Brenk, Frederik (1986). "In the Light of the Moon: Demonology in the Early Imperial Period". In Hasse, Wolfgang (ed.). Religion (Heidentum: Römische Religion, Allgemeines [Forts.]) [Religion (Paganism: Roman Religion, General [cont.])]. Aufstieg und Niedergang der römischen Welt [Rise and Decline of the Roman World]. Vol. 2.16.3. Berlin/New York: De Gruyter. pp. 2068–2145. ISBN 3-11-007612-8.
- Brügger, Claude (2017). Olson, S. Douglas (ed.). Homer's Iliad: The Basel Commentary: Book XXIV. Translated by Millis, Benjamin; Strack, Sara. Berlin: de Gruyter. doi:10.1515/9781501504396. ISBN 978-1-5015-0439-6.
- Calhoun, George M. (1940). "The Divine Entourage in Homer". The American Journal of Philology. 61 (3): 257–277. doi:10.2307/290932. JSTOR 290932.
- Cook, Erwin F. (2018). The Odyssey in Athens: Myths of Cultural Origins. New York: Cornell University Press. ISBN 978-1-5017-2350-6.
- Currie, Bruno (2016). Homer's Allusive Art. Oxford: Oxford University Press. ISBN 978-0-19-108150-7.
- De Jong, Irene (2010) [2001]. A Narratological Commentary on the Odyssey. Cambridge University Press. doi:10.1017/CBO9780511482137. ISBN 978-0-511-48213-7.
- Dickey, Eleanor (2007). Ancient Greek Scholarship: A Guide to Finding, Reading, and Understanding Scholia, Commentaries, Lexica, and Grammatical Treatises, from Their Beginnings to the Byzantine Period. Oxford University Press. ISBN 978-0-19-804266-2.
- Düntzer, Heinrich (1861). "Der Zorn des Poseidon in der Odysse" [The Anger of Poseidon in the Odyssey]. Jahrbücher für Classische Philologie [Annuals of Classical Philology] (in German): 726f.
- Forte, Alexander S. W. (2019). "The Disappearing Turn of Iliad 23.373". Classical Philology. 114 (1): 120–125. doi:10.1086/700618. S2CID 202636328.
- Hartel, Wilhelm (1865). "Untersuchungen über die Entstehung der Odyssee" [Investigations about the Creation of the Odyssey]. Zeitschrift für die österreichischen Gymnasien [Bulletin for the Austrian Gymnasia] (in German). 16: 319f – via Internet Archive.
- Jørgensen, Ove (1904). "Das Auftreten der Götter in den Büchern ι–μ der Odyssee" [The Appearances of the Gods in Books 9–12 of the Odyssey]. Hermes (in German). 39 (3): 357–382. JSTOR 4472953.
- Kayser, Karl Ludwig [in German] (1835). Disputatio de diversa Homericorum carminum origine [Argument about the Disparate Origins of the Homeric Poems] (in Latin). Heidelberg: J. C. B. Mohr. OCLC 690899653 – via Google Books.
- Nieto Hernández, Pura (2000). "Back in the Cave of the Cyclops". American Journal of Philology. 121 (3): 345–366. doi:10.1353/ajp.2000.0036. S2CID 201764200.
- Nitzsch, Gregor Wilhelm (1840). Erklärende Anmerkungen zu Homer's Odyssee [Explanatory Notes on Homer's Odyssey] (in German). Vol. 3. Hannover: Hahn'schen Hofbuchhandlung. OCLC 1405562855.
- Pelliccia, Hayden (1995). Mind, Body, and Speech in Homer and Pindar. Göttingen: Vandenhoeck & Ruprecht. ISBN 978-3-525-25207-9.
- Rothe, Carl (1882). De vetere quem ex Odyssea Kirchhoffius eruit Νόστῳ [On the Ancient Nostos which Kirchoff Has Extracted from the Odyssey] (in Latin). Berlin: J. F. Starcke. OCLC 251943934.
- Scodel, Ruth (1998). "Bardic Performance and Oral Tradition in Homer". The American Journal of Philology. 119 (2): 171–194. doi:10.1353/ajp.1998.0027. JSTOR 1562083. S2CID 161072518.
- Strauss Clay, Jenny (1997). The Wrath of Athena: Gods and Men in the Odyssey. Boulder: Rowman & Littlefield. ISBN 0-8226-3069-9.
