= Gildersleeve Prize =

The Gildersleeve Prize is an annual award of $1,000 to the author of "the best article of the year" published in the American Journal of Philology. It is awarded by The Johns Hopkins University Press and is named after the classical scholar Basil Lanneau Gildersleeve who founded the journal. As of 2018, the prize was renamed the AJP Best Article Prize.

== List of Winners ==
Year	Author	Article
1997	Carol Poster	
1998	Ruth Scodel	Bardic Performance and Oral Tradition in Homer
1999	Lisa Kallet	
2000	William A. Johnson	Toward a Sociology of Reading in Classical Antiquity
2001	Stephen M. Beall	
2002	Zachary P. Biles	Intertextual Biography in the Rivalry of Cratinus and Aristophanes
2003	Gwendolyn Compton-Engle	
2004	Kathryn Gutzwiller	Seeing Thought: Timomachus' Medea and Ecphrastic Epigram
2005	Charles C. Chiasson	Myth, Ritual, and Authorial Control in Herodotus' Story of Cleobis and Biton (Hist. 1.31)
2006	David Sider	The New Simonides and the Question of Historical Elegy
2007	Timothy O'Sullivan	
2008	Judith Fletcher	A Trickster's Oath in the Homeric Hymn to Hermes
2009	Randy Pogorzelski	The Reassurance of Fratricide in the Aeneid
2010	Michael Squire	Making Myron's Cow Moo? Ecphrastic Epigram and the Poetics of Simulation
2011		
2012	Rachel Ahern Knudsen	Poetic Speakers, Sophistic Words
2013	James E. G. Zetzel	A Contract on Ameria: Law and Legality in Cicero's Pro Roscio Amerino
2014	William Josiah Edwards Davis	Terence Interrupted: Literary Biography and the Reception of the Terentian Canon
2015	Matt Cohn	Timokles Satyrographos and the Abusive Satyr Play
2016		
2017	Max Leventhal	Eratosthenes’ Letter to Ptolemy: The Literary Mechanics of Empire
2018	Christopher B. Krebs	The World’s Measure: Caesar’s Geographies of Gallia and Britannia in Their Contexts and as Evidence of His World Map
2019	Ella Haselswerdt	Sound and the Sublime in Sophocles' Oedipus at Colonus: The Limits of Representation
2020	James Uden	The Margins of Satire: Suetonius, Satura, and Scholarly Outsiders in Ancient Rome
2021	Erika Valdivieso	Dissecting a Forgery
2022	Rosa Andújar	Philological Reception and the Repeating Odyssey in the Caribbean: Francisco Chofre’s La Odilea
2023	Chiara Graf	The Pleasures of Flattery and the Hermeneutics of Suspicion in Seneca’s Natural Questions (4a Praef.)
2024	Lewis Webb	Spectatissima Femina: Female Visibility and Religion in Urban Spaces in Republican Rome
