= Ars Nova Copenhagen =

Danish vocal ensemble

Ars Nova Copenhagen is a Danish vocal ensemble based in Copenhagen. The ensemble specialises in the interpretation of the polyphonic choral music of the Renaissance and new vocal music.

== History ==
Ars Nova Copenhagen was founded in 1979 by composer Bo Holten among others. Holten was the first chief conductor of the ensemble and held the post until 1995. Tamás Vetö succeeded Holten as chief conductor in 1995 and served in the post until 2000. Paul Hillier subsequently became chief conductor of the ensemble in 2003 and stood down from the post in 2023.

In March 2024, the ensemble announced the appointment of Sofi Jeannin as its chief conductor, with immediate effect. Jeannin is the first female conductor to be named chief conductor of Ars Nova Copenhagen.

The current roster of singers of the group is:

- Soprano: Ann-Christin Wesser Ingels, Kate Macoboy, Mari Øyrehagen
- Alto: Elenor Wiman, Laura Lamph, Hanne Marie le Fevre
- Tenor: Jakob Skjoldborg, Luís Toscano, James Robinson
- Bass: Asger Lynge Petersen, Rasmus Kure Thomsen, Mikkel Tuxen

== Chief conductors ==
- Bo Holten (1979–1995)
- Tamás Vetö (1995–2000)
- Paul Hillier (2003–2023)
- Sofi Jeannin (2024–present)

== Selected discography ==
=== Renaissance to Baroque ===
- Josquin Desprez: Missa de beata virgine. Vocal Group Ars Nova & Bo Holten. Kontrapunkt
- Pierre de la Rue: Requiem, Giaches de Wert 5 Motets. Vocal Group Ars Nova & Bo Holten. Kontrapunkt 32001.
- Pierre de la Rue: Missa L'Homme Arme. Nicolas Gombert: Lugebat David Absalon, Musae Jovis. Vocal Group Ars Nova & Bo Holten. Kontrapunkt 32008
- Nicolas Gombert: Sacred Music. Vocal Group Ars Nova & Bo Holten. Kontrapunkt 32038
- Thomas Tallis: Felix Namque (I), Felix Namque (II), O Nata Lux Salvator Mundi, The Lamentations Of Jeremiah I, The Lamentations Of Jeremiah II, Videte Miraculum. Vocal Group Ars Nova & Bo Holten with Lars Ulrik Mortensen (harpsichord). Kontrapunkt 32003
- Lassus: Lagrime di San Pietro. Vocal Group Ars Nova & Bo Holten. Naxos (1995)
- Portuguese Polyphony Manuel Cardoso, Pedro de Escobar, Manuel da Fonseca Duarte Lobo. Vocal Group Ars Nova & Bo Holten. Naxos (1995)
- Mogens Pedersøn: Sacred Music From The court Of Christian IV: 3 Hymns from Pratum Spirituale. Ad Te Levavi Oculos Meos. Missa Quinque Vocum. John Dowland Thou Mighty God. Vocal Group Ars Nova & Bo Holten. Kontrapunkt 32100
- John Taverner: Taverner & Tudor Music I - The Western Wind. Ars Nova Copenhagen & Paul Hillier. Ars Nova Records (2006)
- John Taverner: Taverner & Tudor Music II - Gloria tibi Trinitas. Ars Nova Copenhagen & Paul Hillier. Ars Nova Records (2008)
- Heinrich Schütz: The Complete Narrative Works. Lukas-Passion SWV 480 (1666), Weihnachtshistorie SWV 435 (c. 1660), Auferstehungshistorie SWV 50 (c. 1623), Die Sieben Worte, SWV 478 (before 1658), Johannes-Passion, SWV 481 (1666), Matthäus-Passion, SWV 479 (1666). Ars Nova Copenhagen & Paul Hillier. 4CD Dacapo (2011). Also available as single discs.
- Plainchant, various. The Christmas Story. Ars Nova Copenhagen, Theatre of Voices & Paul Hillier. Harmonia Mundi (2011)

=== Romantic ===
- Julens Sange - Christmas songs. Vocal Group Ars Nova & Bo Holten. Exlibris
- Årstidernes sange. Vocal Group Ars Nova & Bo Holten. Exlibris
- Carl Nielsen: Songs. Vocal Group Ars Nova & Bo Holten. Exlibris
- Fædrelandssange. Vocal Group Ars Nova & Tamás Vetö. Exlibris
- The Golden Age of Danish Partsongs. Music by Nielsen, Kuhlau, Weyse, Hartmann, Gade, Laub, Heise, Schultz and Nørholm. Ars Nova Copenhagen & Paul Hillier. Dacapo (2014)

=== Contemporary ===
- Bo Holten: Sønderjysk Sommer Symfoni. Vocal Group Ars Nova & Bo Holten. Exlibris
- Per Nørgård: Den Foruroligende Ælling. Vocal Group Ars Nova & Ivan Hansen. Exlibris
- New Music For Choir - Hans Abrahamsen Universe Birds. Pelle Gudmundsen-Holmgreen Konstateringer. Bo Holten Grundtvig Motets. Per Nørgård Wie Ein Kind. Poul Ruders 2 Motets. Sven-David Sandström En Ny Himmel Och En Ny Jord. Vocal Group Ars Nova & Bo Holten. Kontrapunkt 32016
- Ib Nørholm: Elverspejl (The Elf Mirror), Pavlovski, Resmark, Hoyer, Vocal Group Ars Nova & Frans Rasmussen. Kontrapunkt (1996)
- Bo Holten: Orfeo-Fragmenter I-VI. Niels Rosing-Schow Sommerfugledalen. Exlibris 30055 (1996)
- Ib Nørholm: Choral Works. Americana op. 89, MacMoon Songs III op. 154, Sjaefuld Sommer op. 146, 3 Lieder, Fuglene op.129. Vocal Group Ars Nova, Danish Chamber Players & Tamás Vetö. Dacapo
- Pelle Gudmundsen-Holmgreen: Works for Voices and Instruments. Vocal Group Ars Nova, Athelas Sinfonietta Copenhagen & Ivan Hansen. Dacapo
- Per Nørgård. Singe die Gärten - Works for Choir I. Vocal Group Ars Nova & Tamás Vetö. Dacapo
- Per Nørgård. Mythic Morning - Works for Choir II. Vocal Group Ars Nova & Tamás Vetö. Dacapo (2005)
- Rued Langgaard: Rose Garden Songs. Dacapo. Vocal Group Ars Nova & Tamás Vetö (reissued 2009)
- Terry Riley. In C. Ars Nova Copenhagen & Paul Hillier. Ars Nova Records (2006)
- Per Nørgård: Lygtemaendene tager til byen (The Will-o'-the-Wisps Go to Town), Dam-Jensen, Kihlberg, Gjerris, Henning-Jensen, Jensen, Ars Nova Copenhagen, Danish National Symphony Orchestra & Thomas Dausgaard. Dacapo
- Svend Nielsen (b. 1937). Sommerfugledalen, for 12 solo voices. (Also includes a reading of the poem by the poet recorded in 1991 for the earlier Kontrapunkt release). Ars Nova Copenhagen & Tamás Vetö. Dacapo (2007)
- David Lang (composer). The little Match Girl Passion. Theatre of Voices, Ars Nova Copenhagen & Paul Hillier. harmonia mundi (2009)
- Pelle Gudmundsen-Holmgreen (b. 1932). The Natural World of Pelle Gudmundsen-Holmgreen. Ars Nova Copenhagen & Paul Hillier. Dacapo (2010)
- A Bridge of Dreams. Lou Harrison (America, 1917-2003) Mass for Saint Cecilia's Day (1983). Ross Edwards (composer) (Australia, b. 1943) Sacred Kingfisher Psalms (2009). Jack Body (New Zealand, b.1944) Five Lullabies (1989). Liu Sola (China, b.1955) The Seafarer to a text of Kevin Crossley-Holland (2009). Anne Boyd (Australia, b.1946) As I crossed a bridge of Dreams (1975). A cappella music from Australia and New Zealand. Andrew Lawrence-King, Ars Nova Copenhagen & Paul Hillier. Ars Nova Records (2011)
- Arvo Pärt (b. 1935). Creator Spiritus. Ars Nova Copenhagen & Paul Hillier. Harmonia Mundi (2012)
- Bent Sørensen (composer) (b. 1958)/ Johannes Ockeghem. 'Fragments of Requiem'. Ars Nova Copenhagen & Paul Hillier. Dacapo (2012)
- John Cage: The Complete John Cage Edition Volume 18: The Choral Works 1. Ars Nova Copenhagen & Paul Hillier. Mode Records
- Axel Borup-Jørgensen: Carambolage: Works for ensemble and voice. Århus Sinfonietta, Ars Nova Copenhagen, Søren Kinch Hansen. Dacapo (2014)
- Pablo Ortiz: Gallos y Huesos | Notker. Ars Nova Copenhagen and Paul Hillier. Orchid Records (2015)
- "First Drop". Howard Skempton: "Rise up my love"; Michael Gordon: "He Saw a Skull"; David Lang: "When we were children"; Kevin Volans: "Walking Song [organ]"; Pablo Ortiz: "Five Monets"; Louis Andriessen: "Un beau baiser"; Gabriel Jackson: "L'homme armé"; Howard Skempton: "More sweet than my refrain"; Steve Reich: "Know what is above you"; Steve Reich: "Clapping Music" (arr. Paul Hillier); Terry Riley: "Mexico City Blues"
