= It (poetry collection) =

1969 Danish book by Inger Christensen

- Author: Inger Christensen
- Original title: Det
- Translator: Susanna Nied
- Language: Danish
- Publisher: Gyldendal
- Publication date: 1969
- Publication place: Denmark
- English publication date: 2006
- Pages: 239
- ISBN: 87-00-33492-8

It (Danish: Det) is a 1969 book of poetry by the Danish writer Inger Christensen. The book focuses on social criticism, and lines from it have frequently been quoted in the Danish political discourse. It received the Gyldne Laurbær for best Danish book of the year.

== Reception ==
The book was reviewed in Publishers Weekly in 2006: "Christensen's sprawling, cosmically ambitious, book-length poem became a national hit in Denmark soon after its 1969 publication, and it's not hard to see why. The segments' diverse shapes—prose litany, chiming quatrains, stuttering free verse, telegram, prose diary—show mastery enough for almost any taste, while the overarching ideology—liberation for the whole human person from institutions, laws, mere forms—perfectly fit the late '60s' radical mood. ... Nied (who also translated Christensen's Alphabet) duplicates the Danish poem's mathematical schemes while also conveying its freshness and sense of freedom."

== See also ==
- 1969 in poetry
- Danish literature
