= Siegfried Unseld Preis =

German literary award

- Awarded for: Scientific and literary accomplishments
- Sponsored by: Siegfried Unseld Stiftung
- Date: 28 September
- Country: Germany
- Reward: €50,000
- First award: 2004

The Siegfried Unseld Preis was an international award for scientific and literary accomplishments. It has been awarded biennially on 28 September since its establishment on that date in 2004, the 80th birthday of the German publisher Siegfried Unseld by the Siegfried Unseld Stiftung ("foundation") and has been endowed with an award sum of €50,000.

The prize was presented five times in total, with the final award given in 2012. Notable recipients include the writer Peter Handke (2004) and the philosopher Bruno Latour (2008).

== Laureates ==
- 2004: Peter Handke
- 2006: Inger Christensen
- 2008: Bruno Latour
- 2010: Sari Nusseibeh and Amos Oz
- 2012: Art Spiegelman

== Winners per country ==
Austria	1
Denmark	1
France	1
Israel	1
Palestine	1
United States	1
Total	6
