= Rosa Andújar =

American Classicist

Rosa Andújar is an American classicist and Associate Professor of Classics and Ancient Studies at Barnard College, Columbia University. She is an expert on both ancient Greek tragedy, especially the chorus, and classical reception across the Americas.

== Education ==
Andújar received BAs from Wellesley and King's College, Cambridge. She completed her MA (2008) and her PhD (2011) at Princeton University. Her doctoral thesis was entitled The Chorus in Dialogue: Reading Lyric Exchanges in Greek Tragedy. It was supervised by Andrew L. Ford, Froma Zeitlin, and Bernd Seidensticker.

== Career ==
Andújar was the first A. G. Leventis Research Fellow in Ancient Greek Literature in the Department of Greek and Latin at University College London from 2012 until 2016. From 2016-2025 she was based at King's College London, where she was initially appointed as Deputy Director of Liberal Arts and Lecturer in Liberal Arts before being promoted to Senior Lecturer. In 2019 she was Visiting Professor in Brazil at the Federal University of Paraná. She was the keynote speaker for the 42nd annual meeting of the Australasian Society for Classical Studies in 2021. She was awarded a prestigious British Academy Mid-Career Fellowship for the academic year 2023-2024. In 2025 she held the Pedro Henríquez Ureña Chair (Cátedra Pedro Henríquez Ureña) in the Biblioteca Nacional Pedro Henríquez Ureña (Pedro Henríquez Ureña National Library) in Santo Domingo, Dominican Republic. In 2026 she joined the Classics departments at Barnard and Columbia succeeding Helene Foley.

She is the Editor of the American Journal of Philology. She is also co-editor of the Classics and the Postcolonial book series for Routledge. She is on the editorial board of two Brazilian Classics journals, Nuntius Antiquus and PhaoS - Revista de Estudos Clássicos. In 2019 she was elected to the Council of the Society for the Promotion of Hellenic Studies for a three-year term. She was a founding member of the Women's Classical Committee (UK) and served on the group's first Steering Committee from 2015-2017.

She edited The Greek Trilogy of Luis Alfaro: Electricidad; Oedipus El Rey; Mojada, which brought together for the first time the three 'Greek' plays of Luis Alfaro, a Chicano playwright and performance artist. These plays are based on Sophocles' Electra and Oedipus, and Euripides' Medea. Alfaro's Electricidad, Oedipus El Rey, and Mojada platform the concerns of the Chicanx and wider Latinx communities in Los Angeles and New York through ancient drama. The edition won the 2020 London Hellenic Prize (formerly known as the Criticos Prize). The prize awards £10,000. Previous winners include Alice Oswald for Nobody (2019), Kamila Shamsie for Home Fire (2017), and Anne Carson for Antigonick (2012).

== Publications ==
=== Books ===
- (Rosa Andújar, Elena Giusti, and Jackie Murray, eds.) The Cambridge Companion to Classics and Race (Cambridge: Cambridge University Press, 2026)
- Playing the Chorus in Greek Tragedy (Cambridge: Cambridge University Press, 2025)
- (ed.) The Greek Trilogy of Luis Alfaro: Electricidad; Oedipus El Rey; Mojada (London: Methuen Drama, 2020)
- (Rosa Andújar, Konstantinos P. Nikoloutsos, eds) Greeks and Romans on the Latin American Stage (London: Bloomsbury, 2020)
- (ed.) Paths of Song: The Lyric Dimension of Greek Tragedy (Berlin: De Gruyter, 2018)

=== Articles and book chapters ===
- 'Philological Reception and the Repeating Odyssey in the Caribbean: Francisco Chofre’s La Odilea', American Journal of Philology 143.2 (Summer 2022), pp. 305-334
- 'Phoenician Women: "Deviant" Thebans Out of Time', Queer Euripides: Re-Readings in Greek Tragedy, edited by Sarah Olsen and Mario Telò (Bloomsbury, 2022) pp. 176-185
- 'Choral Mirroring in Euripides' Phaethon', Greek Drama V: Studies in the Theatre of the Fifth and Fourth Centuries BCE, edited by C. W. Marshall and H. Marshall (Bloomsbury, 2020) pp. 101-114
- 'Pedro Henríquez Ureña’s Hellenism and the American Utopia', Bulletin of Latin American Research 37.S1 (November 2018), pp. 168-180
- 'Uncles ex Machina: Familial Epiphany in Euripides’ Electra', Ramus 45.2 (December 2016), pp. 165-191
- 'Revolutionizing Greek Tragedy in Cuba: Virgilio Piñera’s Electra Garrigó', The Oxford Handbook of Greek Drama in the Americas, edited by K. Bosher, F. Macintosh, J. McConnell, and P. Rankine (Oxford, 2015) pp. 361-379
