= S. P. L. Sørensen =

Danish chemist (1868–1939)

Søren Sørensen
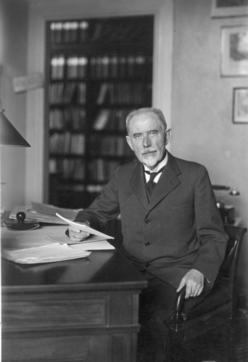
- S. P. L. Sørensen
- Born: 9 January 1868; Havrebjerg, Denmark
- Died: 12 February 1939 (aged 71); Copenhagen, Denmark
- Education: University of Copenhagen
- Known for: pH
- Spouse: Margrethe Høyrup Sørensen
- Scientific career
- Fields: Chemistry
- Workplaces: Carlsberg Laboratory
- Doctoral advisor: Sophus Mads Jørgensen
- Notable students: Kaj Ulrik Linderstrøm-Lang (postdoc); Edwin Joseph Cohn (postdoc)

Søren Peter Lauritz Sørensen (9 January 1868 – 12 February 1939) was a Danish chemist, known for the introduction of the concept of pH, a scale for measuring acidity and alkalinity.

== Personal life ==
Sørensen was born in Havrebjerg in 1868 as the son of a farmer. He began his studies at the University of Copenhagen at the age of 18. He wanted to make a career in medicine, but under the influence of chemist Sophus Mads Jørgensen decided to change to chemistry.

While studying for his doctorate he worked as assistant in chemistry at the laboratory of the Technical University of Denmark, assisted in a geological survey of Denmark, and also worked as a consultant for the Royal Navy Dockyard.

Sørensen was married twice. His second wife was Margrethe Høyrup Sørensen, who collaborated with him in his studies.

== Work ==
From 1901 to 1938, Sørensen was head of the prestigious Carlsberg Laboratory, Copenhagen. While working at the Carlsberg Laboratory he studied the effect of ion concentration on proteins and, because the concentration of hydrogen ions was particularly important, he introduced the pH-scale as a simple way of expressing it in 1909. The article in which he introduced the scale (using the notation $p_\mathrm{H}$) was published in French and Danish as well as in German described two methods for measuring acidity which Sørensen and his students had refined. The first method was based on electrodes, whereas the second involved comparing the colours of samples and a preselected set of indicators. (Sørensen, 1909).

From p. 134: "Die Größe der Wasserstoffionenkonzentration ... und die Bezeichnung $p_\mathrm{H}$ für den numerischen Wert des Exponent dieser Potenz benütze." (The magnitude of the hydrogen ion concentration is accordingly expressed by the normality factor of the solution concerned, based on the hydrogen ions, and this factor is written in the form of a negative power of 10. By the way, as I refer [to it] in a following section (see p. 159), I just want to point out here that I use the name "hydrogen ion exponent" and the notation $p_\mathrm{H}$ for the numerical value of the exponent of this power.)

From pp. 159–160: "Für die Zahl p schlage ich den Namen "Wasserstoffionenexponent" ... Normalitätsfaktors der Lösung verstanden." (For the number p I suggest the name "hydrogen ion exponent" and the notation $p_\mathrm{H}$. By the hydrogen ion exponent ($p_\mathrm{H}$) of a solution is thus understood the Briggsian logarithm of the reciprocal value of the normality factor of the solution, based on the hydrogen ions, and this factor is written in the form of a negative power of 10).

Starting on p. 139, "4. Meßmethoden zur Bestimmung der Wasserstoffionenkonzentration." (4. Methods of measurement for the determination of hydrogen ion concentration.), Sørensen reviewed a series of methods for measuring hydrogen ion concentration. He rejected all of them except two.

From p. 144: "Es gibt noch zwei Verfahrungsweisen, ... bzw. die colorimetrische Methode genannt." (There are still two procedures by which the hydrogen or hydroxyl ion concentration of a solution can be determined; namely, gas chain measurement and determination by means of indicators, also called the electrometric or colorimetric method.) On pp. 145–146, Sørensen outlined the electrometric and colorimetric methods:

From p. 145: "Die elektrometrische Methode. Wird eine mit Platin-schwarz bedeckte Platinplatte in eine wäßerige ... von der Wasserstoffionenkonzentration der Lösung abhängt.)" (The electrometric method. If a platinum plate that's covered with platinum black is dipped into an aqueous – acidic, neutral, or alkaline – solution and if the solution is saturated with hydrogen, then one finds, between the platinum plate and the solution, a voltage difference whose magnitude depends on the hydrogen ion concentration of the solution according to a law.

From pp. 145: "Die colorimetrische Methode. Der Umschlag des Indicators bei einer gewöhnlichen Titrierung bedeutet ja, wie bekannt, daß die Konzentration der Wasserstoffionen der vorliegenden Lösung eine gewisse Größe von der einen oder der anderen Seite her erreicht oder überschritten hat." (The colorimetric method. The sudden change of the indicator during a typical titration means, as is known, that the concentration of hydrogen ions in the solution at hand has reached or exceeded – from one direction or the other – a certain magnitude.)

p. 146: "Die Grundlage ist seit langer Zeit bekannt, ... eine vollständige Reihe Indikatoren mit Umschlagspunkten bei den verschiedensten Ionenkonzentrationen zusammenzustellen." (The basis [of the colorimetric method] has been known for a long time, but the scattered material was first struggled through and perfected at certain points by the beautiful investigations of Hans Friedenthal [1870-1942] and Eduard Salm, so that it became possible for them to assemble a complete series of indicators with transition points at the most varied ion concentrations.)

On pp. 150ff, the electrometric method is detailed; and on pp. 201ff, the colorimetric method is detailed.
