= Susanna Nied =

American writer and translator

Susanna C. Nied
- Born: June 27, 1947 (age 79); California
- Occupations: Writer, Translator
- Writing career
- Subject: Poetry

Susanna C. Nied is an American writer and translator.

== Life ==
Her work has appeared in periodicals such as Poetry, APR, Grand Street, Tin House, Two Lines, Poetry East, and Scandinavian Review, and in anthologies such as The Ecco Anthology of International Poetry (Ecco/Harper Collins, 2010), World Beat: International Poetry Now (New Directions, 2006), 100 Great Poems of the 20th Century, (W.W. Norton, 2005), and New Directions 49 (New Directions, 1985).

== Awards ==
- 2012 Finalist, PEN Award for Poetry in Translation
- 2009 John Frederick Nims Memorial Translation Prize of Poetry Magazine
- 2007 Harold Morton Landon Translation Award of the Academy of American Poets
- 2005 Finalist, PEN Award for Poetry in Translation
- 2005 PEN Translation Fund Grant Award
- 1982 PEN/American-Scandinavian Foundation Translation Prize

== Works ==
- Eliot Weinberger, ed. (2006). "from Alphabet". World Beat. New Directions Publishing. p. 123. ISBN 978-0-8112-1651-7.
- "Winter". Poetry Daily. May 2009.
- Inger Christensen (2001). Alphabet. Translator Susanna Nied. New Directions Publishing. ISBN 978-0-8112-1477-3.
- Inger Christensen (2004). Butterfly Valley: A Requiem. Translator Susanna Nied. New Directions Publishing. ISBN 978-0-8112-1579-4.
- Inger Christensen (2006). It. Translator Susanna Nied. New Directions Publishing. ISBN 978-0-8112-1594-7.
- Inger Christensen (2011). Light, Grass, and Letter in April. Translator Susanna Nied. Drawings by Johanne Foss. New Directions Publishing. ISBN 978-0-8112-1869-6.
- Søren Ulrik Thomsen (1999). Selected Poems by Søren Ulrik Thomsen. Poetry New York.
