= Marianne Larsen =

Danish poet, writer and novelist (1951–2025)

- Born: Inger Marianne Larsen; 27 January 1951; Kalundborg, Denmark
- Died: 2 December 2025 (aged 74)
- Education: University of Copenhagen
- Occupations: Writer, poet
- Writing career
- Language: Danish
- Years active: 1971–2025
- Genres: Poetry; novel; short story
- Notable works: Det må siges enkelt, 1976; Hinandens kræfter, 1980
- Notable awards: Danske Akademis Store Pris, 2022

Inger Marianne Larsen (27 January 1951 – 2 December 2025) was a Danish poet, writer and novelist.

== Life and career ==
Between 1970 and 1975 Larsen was studying literature and Chinese at the University of Copenhagen, but then made the decision to write full-time.

First poems were published in the magazine Hvedekorn (Wheatgrain) when she was 18, followed by her first poetry collection, Koncentrationer (Concentrations), in 1971. Her writing at this early stage was experimental, giving way to a more engaged, affirmative style, both critical of officialdom and supportive of the underdog from a leftist point of view.

Larsen's first three novels, published between 1989 and 1992, were about a provincial girl's coming of age and partly autobiographical. Following these, she wrote more novels, as well as books for children and young adults.

Over the years she was the recipient of many literary awards and prizes. The most recent of these was the Danske Akademis Store Pris (Great Prize of the Danish Academy) in 2022 with the citation: "Since her debut in 1971...her openly political dream world has been a seemingly endless and natural source of power in literature and in the Danish language."

There have been three English selections of Marianne Larsen's poetry from three continents. The first, by Nadia Christensen, appeared in 1982 in the United States, and Robyn Ianssen's selection, Shadow Calendar, followed in Australia in 1995. A third, gathering work from several translators, was published from the UK as A Common Language in 2006.

Larsen died on 2 December 2025, at the age of 74.
