= Bernd Seidensticker =

German classical scholar (born 1939)

- Born: 1939 (age 86–87)

Academic background
- Education: University of Tübingen; University of Hamburg

Academic work
- Discipline: Classics
- Sub-discipline: Ancient Greek literature

Bernd Seidensticker (born 1939) is a German classical scholar, known chiefly for his work on Greek tragedy.

== Biography ==
Seidensticker was born in 1939 in Hirschberg im Riesengebirge, a town in Silesia which is now Jelenia Góra in southwestern Poland.

After being educated at the Athenaeum Stade in Lower Saxony, Seidensticker studied classical philology and German at the University of Tübingen and the University of Hamburg, under professors such as Hartmut Erbse, Wolfgang Schadewaldt and Bruno Snell. In 1965, he passed the Staatsexamen and became an assistant lecturer at the University of Hamburg. He obtained his doctorate at Hamburg in 1968, with a thesis written under the supervision of Hans Joachim Mette. This thesis, which concerns stichomythia and other forms of compressed dialogue in the tragedies of the Roman playwright Seneca, was then published and widely reviewed, including outside Germany.

In 1973–1974, Seidensticker held a junior fellowship at the Center for Hellenic Studies, Washington, D.C. In 1978, he obtained his habilitation with a thesis on comic and humorous elements in Greek tragedy: this was also published as a book and widely reviewed. One section of this book, on comic elements in Euripides' Bacchae, was also published separately in an English version in the American Journal of Philology. Seidensticker was then appointed professor at Hamburg in 1980, before becoming professor at the Freie Universität Berlin in 1987.

In 1989, Seidensticker held a fellowship at the Institute for Advanced Study in Princeton, and he also held guest professorships at the University of Texas at Austin (1974–1975, 1976–1977, 1980, 1986, 1990), at the University of California, Berkeley (1981), at Harvard University (1986), and at the University of Michigan (1992). In 1993 he was elected a member of the Berlin-Brandenburg Academy of Sciences and Humanities, and in 1999 he was elected a corresponding member of the interdisciplinary Brunswick Scientific Society (Braunschweigische Wissenschaftliche Gesellschaft). He served from 1995 to 1997 as chair of the Mommsen Society (Mommsen-Gesellschaft), and then from 1997 to 1999 as its vice-chair. He served for many years as editor of the journal Philologus.

He retired from his professorship at the Freie Universität Berlin in March 2004.

== Selected publications ==
=== Monographs ===
- Seidensticker, Bernd (1969). Die Gesprächsverdichtung in den Tragödien Senecas. Winter Verlag.
- Seidensticker, Bernd (1982). Palintonos Harmonia: Studien zu komischen Elementen in der griechischen Tragödie. Vandenhoeck & Ruprecht. ISBN 9783666251696.
- Seidensticker, Bernd (2010). Das antike Theater. Beck. ISBN 9783406587962.

=== Editions of ancient texts ===
- Krumeich, Ralf; Pechstein, Nikolaus; Seidensticker, Bernd (1999). Das griechische Satyrspiel. Wissenschaftliche Buchgesellschaft. ISBN 9783534145935.
- Seidensticker, Bernd (2020). Euripides: Kyklops. De Gruyter. ISBN 9783110453386.

=== Collections of articles ===
- Seidensticker, Bernd (2005). Über das Vergnügen an tragischen Gegenständen: Studien zum antiken Drama. Saur. ISBN 9783598730245.
- Seidensticker, Bernd (2020). Studien zu Homer, zur Tragödie und zum Satyrspiel. De Gruyter. ISBN 9783968216539.

=== Edited volumes ===
- Faber, Richard; Seidensticker, Bernd, eds. (1996). Worte, Bilder, Töne: Studien zur Antike und Antikerezeption, Bernhard Kytzler zu ehren. Königshausen und Neumann. ISBN 9783826011795.
- Jens, Walter; Seidensticker, Bernd, eds. (2003). Ferne und Nähe der Antike: Beiträge zu den Künsten und Wissenschaften der Moderne. De Gruyter. ISBN 9783110172386.
- Vöhler, Martin; Seidensticker, Bernd, eds. (2005). Mythenkorrekturen: zu einer paradoxalen Form der Mythenrezeption. De Gruyter. ISBN 9783110182903.
- Nippel, Wilfried; Seidensticker, Bernd, eds. (2005). Theodor Mommsens langer Schatten: das römische Staatsrecht als bleibende Herausforderung für die Forschung. Olms. ISBN 9783487130866.
- Seidensticker, Bernd; Vöhler, Martin, eds. (2006). Gewalt und Ästhetik: zur Gewalt und ihrer Darstellung in der griechischen Klassik. De Gruyter. ISBN 9783110184327.
- Seidensticker, Bernd; Vöhler, Martin, eds. (2006). Altertumswissenschaften in Berlin um 1800 an Akademie, Schule und Universität. Wehrhahn. ISBN 9783865250384.
- Vöhler, Martin; Seidensticker, Bernd, eds. (2007). Katharsiskonzeptionen vor Aristoteles. De Gruyter. ISBN 9783110184334.
