= Puk Damsgård =

Danish journalist and author

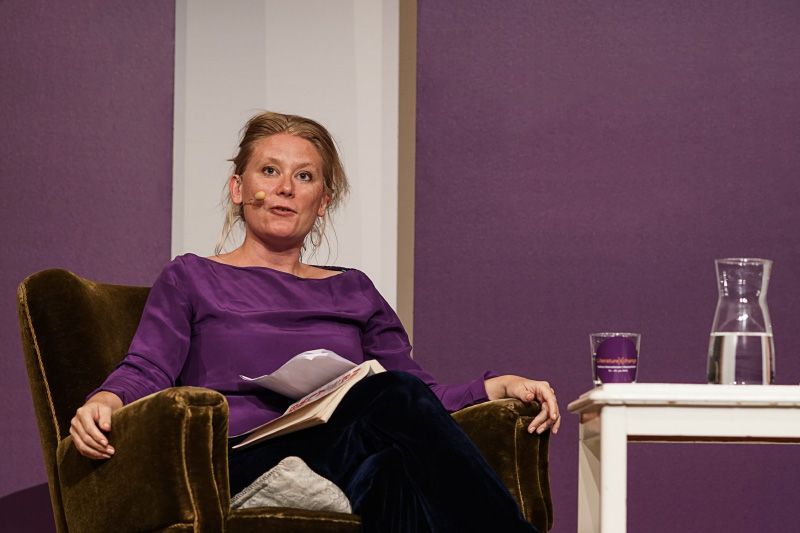
- Damsgaard at the LitteratureXchange Festival in Aarhus, Denmark 2019
- Born: Puk Damsgård Andersen; 18 September 1978; Hammer-Torup, Næstved Municipality, Denmark
- Occupations: Biographer journalist writer

Puk Damsgård Andersen (born 18 September 1978 in Hammer-Torup, Næstved, Denmark) is a Danish journalist and author.

From 2011 to 2026, she was the designated Middle East correspondent for Danmarks Radio, based in Cairo, Egypt. She decided to stop in May 2026 in order to focus on more storytelling journalism.

== Education ==
She has a degree in acting from Holbergs Film + Teaterskole, where she attended from 1999 to 2001. In 2007, she completed a bachelor's programme in journalism at University of Southern Denmark. Later, she completed a master's programme in Arabic.

== Career ==
After finishing her education, she was a journalist at Jyllands-Posten, but quit after a few months.

She became a freelance correspondent in 2008, reporting on the Middle East.

== Awards ==
In 2015, she won the Cavling Prize for her book Ser du månen, Daniel (English: Do You See the Moon, Daniel).

She was awarded the Rungstedlund Award in 2020.

== Bibliography ==
- Mellem Taleban og fremtiden: en fortælling om de unge i Kabul (2006) ISBN 87-7973-155-4
- På jordomrejse med Galathea 3: vor tids største danske opdagelsesrejse: København-Cape Town (2006) ISBN 87-7692-106-9
- På jordomrejse med Galathea 3: vor tids største danske opdagelsesrejse: Cape Town-København (2007) ISBN 978-87-769-2107-1
- De renes land: kærlighedshistorier fra verdens farligste stat (2009) ISBN 978-87-7692-214-6
- Ulvehjerter: en familiekrønike (2011) ISBN 978-87-400-0038-2
- Hvor solen græder: en fortælling fra Syrien (2014) ISBN 978-87-400-1342-9
- Ser du månen, Daniel: 13 måneder som gidsel hos Islamisk Stat (2015) ISBN 978-87-400-2083-0
- Den sorte kat i Mosul (2017) ISBN 978-87-400-3541-4
- Arabica (2020) ISBN 978-87-400-5366-1
