= Jackie Murray =

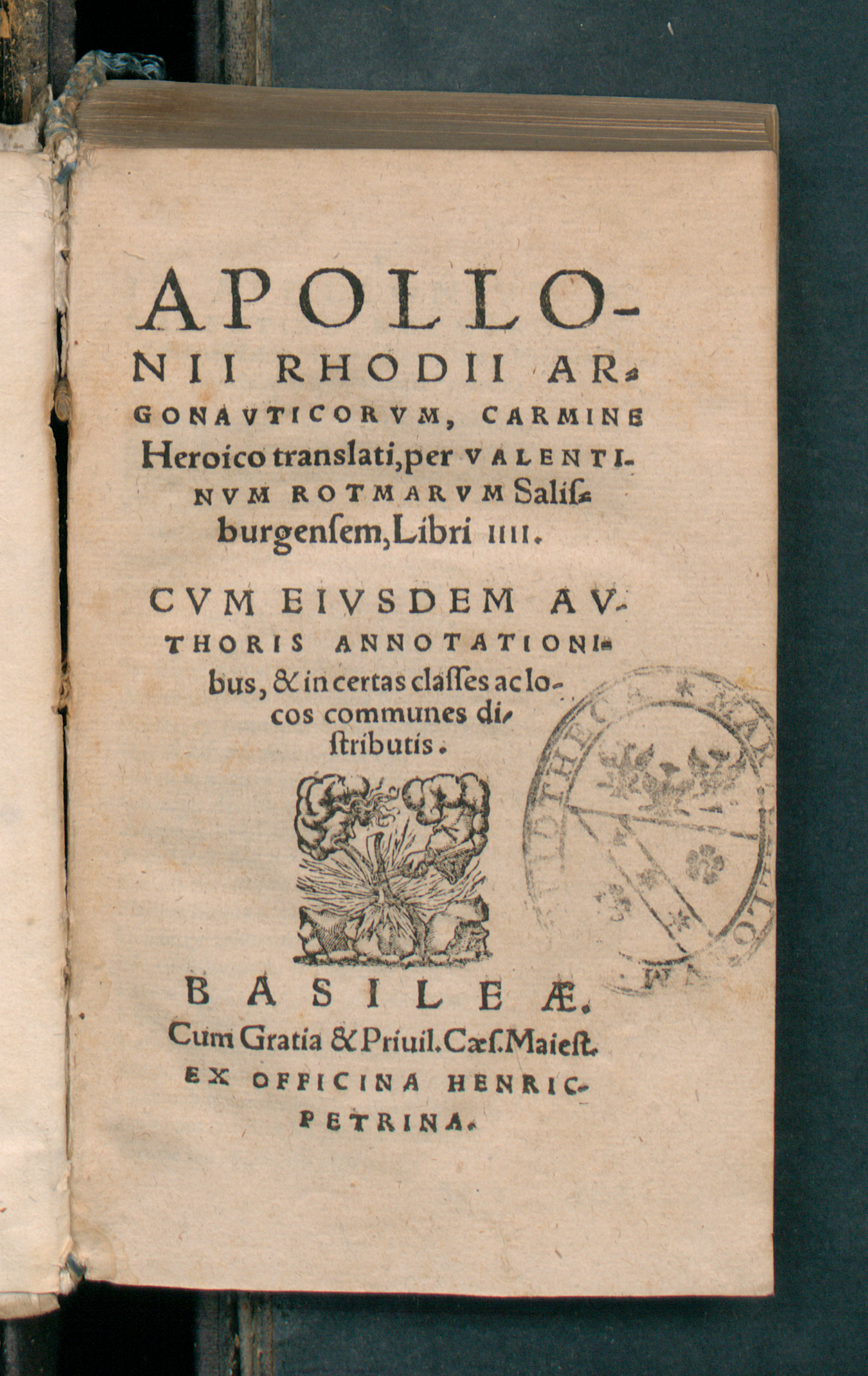
An early printed copy of Apollonius of Rhodes' Argonautica published in Latin (1572)

Jackie Murray is Associate Professor of Classics at the State University of New York at Buffalo. She is an expert on Hellenistic poetry, Classics and Race, Race and Slavery in Plato's Dialogues, and the reception of Classics in African American and Afro-Caribbean literature.

== Education ==
Murray received her PhD in Classics from the University of Washington in 2005. Her doctoral thesis was entitled Polyphonic Argo. Murray completed her BA (Summa Cum Laude) at the University of Guelph in Classical Studies and Latin, and she was awarded an MA in classics from the University of Western Ontario.

== Career ==
Murray's published research focuses on Roman and Hellenistic literature, especially Apollonius, and race and ethnicity in the ancient world.

Murray received the Andrew Heiskell/National Endowment for the Humanities Post-Doctoral Rome Prize from the American Academy in Rome (2011–12). She was the first black woman to be awarded the Rome Prize in ancient studies. Her research project focused on Apollonius’ Argonautica. Since then she has held a Margo Tytus Fellowship for Visiting Scholars at the University of Cincinnati (2017), and a Deutscher Akademischer Austauschdienst (DAAD) Fellowship in 2021. Murray was the John P. Birkelund Fellow in the Humanities at the American Academy in Berlin (Fall 2022), and a Fellow at the Harvard University Center for Hellenic Studies (2025), where she has previously held a scholarship and visiting fellowship (2018 and 2020). From 2014-2022 She was Associate Professor of Classics in the Modern and Classical Languages, Literatures, and Cultures Department at the University of Kentucky. She is currently Associate Professor in the Department of Classics at the University at Buffalo (SUNY) in 2023.

== Publications ==
Murray's Curriculum Vitae is available on Academia.edu. Her monograph, Apollonius' Argonautica and the Poetics of Controversy (DeGruyter/Brill 2026) formulates a new critical framework to explain the intellectual, structural, and metapoetic design of Apollonius Rhodius' Argonautica. The central thesis is that Apollonius systematically employs the "poetics of controversy", which is the deliberate integration of the live debates of his contemporary Alexandrians over philology, astronomy, historiography, and philosophy into the fabric of the epic narrative. Besides focusing on Apollonius of Rhodes, she has also written articles on Hellenistic poets, e.g., Callimachus of Cyrene, Herodas, as well as on the female poets, Erinna, Nossis, and Anyte. Her 2014 article, Anchored in Time: The Date in Apollonius' Argonautica, uses the astronomical references in the Argonautica to show that the poem commemorates the year 238 BCE. In 238 BCE, Ptolemy III Euergetes introduced the first 365.25 day calendar with a leap year. The leap year was a reform to the Egyptian 365 day Sirius based Calendar. Murray's argument returns the dating of the Argonautica back to the late 3rd century dating reported all the ancient sources except the so-called List of Alexandrian Librarians (P.Oxy. 1241), which Murray argues in a 2012 article should not be treated as more historically valid that the transmitted source as it was likely a parody of the notes of an ancient grammarian, and not serious ancient scholarship.

She also co-edited (with Rosa Andújar and Elena Giusti) the Cambridge Companion to Classics and Race (2026).
