= Poul Borum =

Danish writer, poet and critic

- Born: 15 October 1934
- Died: 10 May 1996 (aged 61)
- Other names: Poul Villiam Borum
- Occupations: Poet and critic
- Spouse: Inger Christensen

Poul Villiam Borum (15 October 1934 – 10 May 1996) was a Danish writer, poet and critic. He was editor of the influential Danish literary magazine Hvedekorn from 1968 to his death in 1996. He also initiated the Danish writers school (Forfatterskolen) in 1987, of which he was also principal. Borum was married to Danish poet Inger Christensen for 17 years; the couple had one son.
