= Rungstedlund Award =

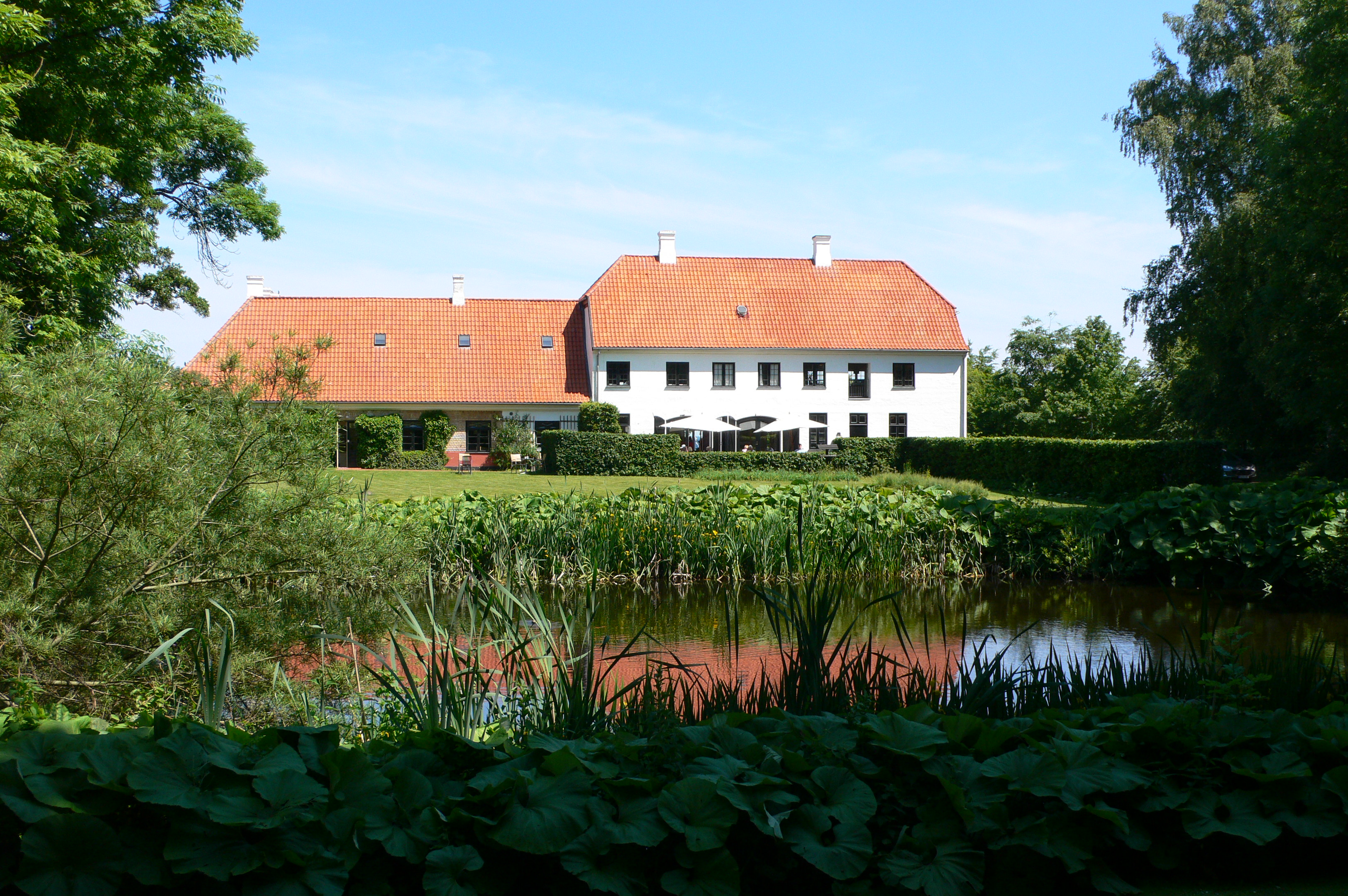
Rungstedlund, site of the Karen Blixen Museum

The Rungstedlund Award is an award of honour, founded by the Rungstedlund Foundation (Rungstedlundfonden) in 1991. The DKK 25,000 prize is annually handed to a person who has made a notable contribution in an area which interested Karen Blixen. The prize is handed at the birthday of Karen Blixen on 17 April. The award comes from a gift from Hørsholm Municipality at the opening of the Karen Blixen Museum on 14 May 1991.

Rungstedlund was the country house in Rungsted near Copenhagen which was owned by Karen Blixen from 1939-58. Rungstedlund is now the site of the Karen Blixen Museum.

== Recipients of the Rungstedlund Award ==
Year	Award winner	Comment
2020	Puk Damsgård	
2019	Lars von Trier	
2018	Minik Rosing	
2017	Niels Barfoed	
2016	Jette Baagøe	
2015	Tom Buk-Swienty	
2014	Marianne Juhl and Marianne Wirenfeldt Asmussen	
2013	Karen-Lise Mynster	
2012	Gabriel Axel	
2011	Otto B. Lindhardt	
2010	Johannes Riis	
2009	Klaus Rifbjerg	
2008	Aage V. Jensen	
2007	Judith Thurman	
2006	Hans Edvard Nørregård-Nielsen	
2005	Suzanne Brøgger	
2003	Aage Henriksen	25 000 DKK
2002	Lin Hua	From China, translator
2001	Inger Christensen	Speech by Torben Brostrøm in Information on 18 April 2001
2000	Liselotte Henriksen	
1999	Tove Hussein	
1998	Thorkild Bjørnvig	
1997	Bodil Kjer	
1996	Arne Schiøtz	
1995	Palle Nielsen	
1994	Clara Selborn	
1993	Meryl Streep	USA, for her role as Karen Blixen in the film Out of Africa based on Den afrikanske farm (The African Farm)
1992	Jørgen Gustava Brandt	
1991	Knud W. Jensen	
