= Maren Sørensen =

Danish Lutheran priest (1882–1957)

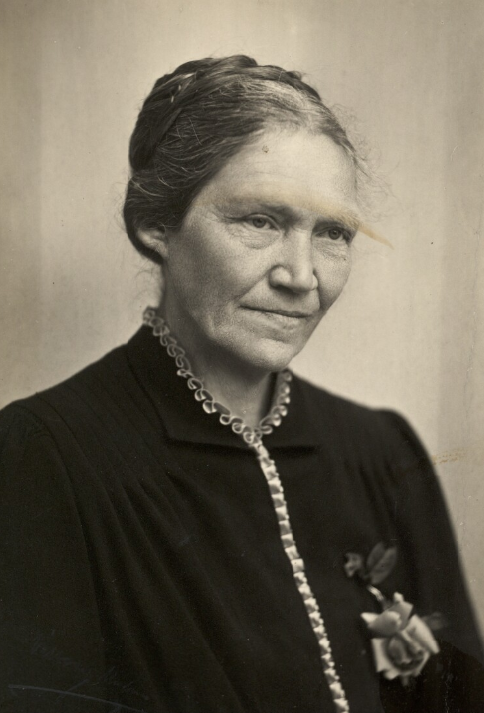
Maren Sørensen (c.1914–18)

Maren Sørensen (1882–1957) is considered to be the first female Danish priest. She was ordained by the independent Grundtvigian cleric Niels Dael in 1940 in Havrebjerg. Sørensen is also remembered for her extensive work as a nurse, foster mother and family carer in Southern Jutland.

== Biography ==
Born on 12 July 1882 in Varde Municipality in the west of Jutland, Maren Sørensen was the daughter of the farmer Jacob Sørensen (1842–1921) and Ane Cathrine Nielsen (1849–1900). From the age of four, she was brought up by her paternal grandparents. Her grandfather Elias S. Han was a devout Methodist who cast aspersions on those who did not conform to his beliefs. When she was 10, she returned to live with her mother, resolving to serve God with a more joyful Christian attitude.

The years she spent caring for her ailing mother inspired her to become a nurse. She first attended Janderup high school, before continuing her education at Sankt Lukas Stiftelsen and the Blegdam Hospital in Copenhagen. After spending three years as a nurse in Strøby, Stevns, she went on a course at Liselund's Grundtvigian school founded by Niels Dael. Deeply influenced by both Dael and Laurids Bertelsen Poulsen who had ties to religious developments in Southern Jutland, for the next 11 years she became a travelling nurse in the Tønder district and, from 1912, in Flensburg. Settling in Holbøl, she founded the Danish Nursing Association in Flensburg (Dansk Sygeplejeforening i Flensborg). When the First World War began in 1914, she volunteered for war service, caring for people of various nationalities, especially French and Russian prisoners of war.

In 1920, she took charge of the newly built children's home in Vilstrup near Haderslev where she remained for the next 26 years, caring for more than 8,000 frail children from Southern Jutland during the summer months. She nevertheless spent the winters back in Southern Jutland caring for the Danish-speaking population just south of the border. In 1930, she built a community centre in Valsbøl which, in addition to rooms for sewing and carpentry, housed a prayer room and her own living quarters. Funded by private gifts and supported by national associations, it was opened by Dael over a three-day event which attracted 800 people.

Although she was not entitled to become a priest under Danish regulations, she acted as a cleric, conducting services and carrying out other religious duties. Nevertheless, in 1940 she was ordained by Niels Dael in the independent Lutheran church in Havrebjerg. She was therefore not ordained into the National Church of Denmark or Danske Folkekirke which first admitted women priests in 1947. Owing to the difficulties arising from the Second World War, she was unable to work in Southern Jutland but returned to Valsbøl after the hostilities had ended. In 1948, when the Church of Denmark appointed a Danish priest in Valsbøl, Sørensen returned to Vilstrup. In 1952, she was honoured with the Order of the Dannebrog.

Maren Sørensen died in Haderslev on 4 July 1957 and is buried in Lønborg Cemetery near Tarm in the west of Jutland.
