= Bodil Kjer =

Danish actress (1917–2003)

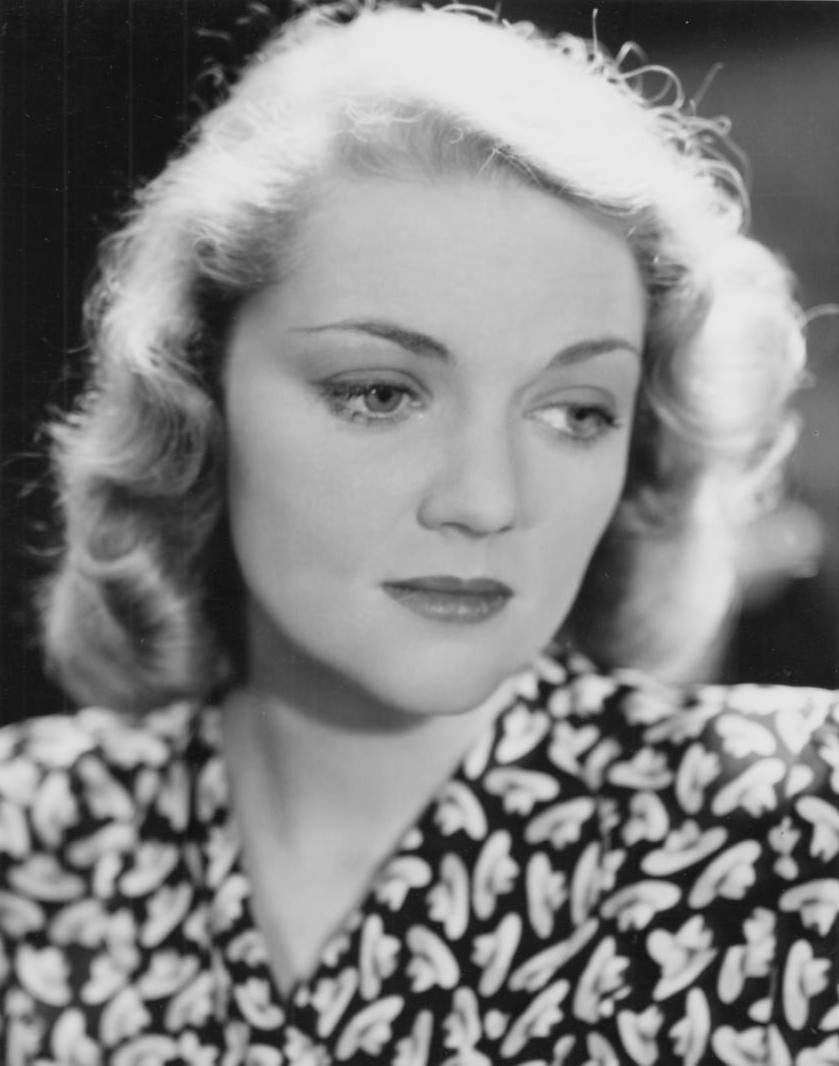
- Kjer c. 1944
- Born: Bodil Valborg Karen Ellen Kjer; 2 September 1917; Odense, Denmark
- Died: 1 February 2003 (aged 85); Vedbæk, Denmark
- Years active: 1937–2001
- Spouse(s): Ebbe Rode (m. 1939; div. 1945) Olaf Nordgreen (m. 1957, divorced) Frits Hinrichsen (m. 1980; died 1982)
- Awards: Bodil Award (1948, 1952, 1977); Ingenio et arti (1951); Tagea Brandt Rejselegat (1952); Order of the Dannebrog (1966); Rungstedlund Award (1997); Bodil Award for lifetime achievement (1997); The Golden Mermaid for lifetime achievement (2000)

Bodil Kjer (Danish: [ˈpoːtil ˈkʰeˀɐ̯]; 2 September 1917 – 1 February 2003) was a Danish actress and a leading actress in mid-20th century Danish cinema. Her talent and charisma earned her status as a primadonna and the title of first lady of Danish theater.

Kjer studied at the Royal Danish Theatre where she made her debut in 1937. She continued to perform with the Royal Danish Theatre throughout her career, except during the period from 1955 to 1960 when she performed with Det Ny Teater. Although she became a staple of Danish cinema and gained popularity through her roles on film, she remained closely associated with the theatre, where the majority of her artistic development is considered to have occurred.

Kjer's leading roles reflect the span of Denmark's modern cinema: from the artistic maturity of the war-torn 1940s in Jenny and the Soldier, the light-hearted romance of the 1950s and 1960s in Mød mig på Cassiopeia, the action drama of the 1970s in Strømer, to the modern epic tale in Babette's Feast (1987).

She was the recipient of a number of awards for her contributions to Danish theatre and cinema, including the Ingenio et arti, Order of the Dannebrog, Rungstedlund Award, Tagea Brandt Rejselegat, and several Bodil Awards. Denmark's most prestigious film prize, the Bodil Awards, were named in honor of Kjer and Bodil Ipsen.

== Early life and education ==
Bodil Valborg Karen Ellen Kjer was born 2 September 1917 in Odense, Denmark to Elli Harries (1883–1945) and Ernst Kjer (1883–1958), a business manager. From an early age, Kjer was convinced that she would pursue acting as a career, having delighted in performing for her parents and their guests from the age of 6. She came from a bourgeois family which did not object to her ambitions and had the means to send her to Odense Theatre to study after she graduated from Sct. Knuds Gymnasium.

After being admitted to Odense Theatre, she found the programme inadequate and shortly thereafter enrolled at the Royal Danish Theatre's school in 1936. Kjer later reflected that she was young and naive when she moved to Copenhagen. She made her theatrical debut with the Royal Theatre the following year as the muse in Inger Bentzon's Hvo, som forarger.

== Career ==
Following her debut, she performed a number of roles as young women, in plays such as Sparekassen (1940) and En kvinde er overlægde (1942). During the Occupation of Denmark in the late 1930s, Kjer, her husband Ebbe Rode, and her colleague Mogens Wieth fled to Sweden. At the time, the three of them were considered the most promising trio in Danish theatre.

During the 1940s and early 1950s, Kjer's popularity grew following a series of successful films, namely Elly Petersen (1944), Jenny and the Soldier (1947), and Meet Me on Cassiopeia (1951). After Meet Me on Cassiopeia, Kjer took a 17-year hiatus from performing on film. Despite being one of the country's most popular film stars, she continued to work as a theatrical actress and the majority of her artistic development is considered to have taken place in the theatre. She performed at Det Ny Teater for five seasons from 1955 to 1960 to work with director Peer Gregaard. When with Det Ny Teater, she performed in The Misanthrope, The Waltz of the Toreadors, Cat on a Hot Tin Roof, The Lady of the Camellias, The Taming of the Shrew, and Requiem for a Nun, among others.

By the time she returned to the Royal Theatre in 1960, she was the undisputed leading woman of Danish theatre. Among the roles she performed at the Royal Theatre after 1960 were Lady Macbeth (1961), Medea (1965), and Marthe in Goethe's Faust (1984). In 1980, she toured with her former husband, Ebbe Rode, performing Dear Liar. In commemoration of the 60th anniversary of her debut as an actress, she and Rode performed together until 1997 in Love Letters.

In addition to her performances on stage and film, she also made a number of appearances in television series, most notably as Irene in Søskende (1961), the title role in Leif Panduro's Bella (1970), and as Caroline Jacobsen in four episodes of Bryggeren (1996–1997). Her later films included The Missing Clerk (1971), Strømer (1976), and Babette's Feast (1987).

Kjer accumulated a number of awards across her career. She was awarded the Gösta Ekman award in 1946; the Ingenio et arti in 1951; the Tagea Brandt Rejselegat in 1952; the Teaterpokalen in 1952; and the Rungstedlund Award in 1997. She won the Bodil Award three times: for Jenny and the Soldier (1948), Meet Me on Cassiopeia (1952), and Strømer (1977). In 1997, she also accepted an honorary Bodil for lifetime achievement. In addition, Kjer was inducted as a member of the Order of the Dannebrog in 1966, made a knight of the first degree in 1976, and a commander of the order in 1994.

== Personal life ==
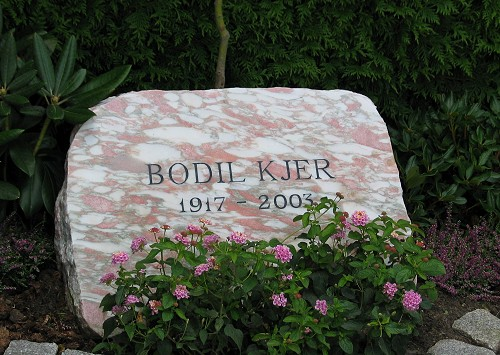
Bodil Kjer's gravestone

On 31 May 1939, she married actor Ebbe Rode. Their marriage was dissolved in 1945. She was briefly in a relationship with Svend Bergsøe (1902–1985), a manufacturer. She was remarried in 1957 to Olaf Nordgreen (1920–1994), an actor and theatre publisher, though their marriage was later dissolved. In 1980, she married hotel owner Frits Hinrichsen, who died in 1982.

Her memoir, Et offentligt fruentimmer (lit. 'A Harlot'), was released in 1997 alongside the photo book Billeder af Bodil Kjer. Kjer died on 1 February 2003 at the Kraagholmgaard senior centre in Vedbæk, near the estate Frydenlund where she had resided for more than 30 years. She was buried at Vedbæk Church's cemetery.

== Selected filmography ==
- Flådens blå matroser (1937) as Kontordame hos Holm
- Balletten danser (1938) as Else Møller
- En ganske almindelig pige (1940) as Tove Jørgensen
- Far skal giftes (1941) as Birthe Jensen
- Tante Cramers testamente (1941) as Husassistent Gerda Hansen
- Tag til Rønneby kro (1941) as Anne Lise
- Søren Søndervold (1942) as Hanne
- Vi kunne ha' det så rart (1942) as Lene Bang
- En herre i kjole og hvidt (1942) as Lilly Jensen
- Det brændende spørgsmål (1943) as Bodil Kragh
- Hans onsdagsveninde (1943) as Magda Hansen
- Drama på slottet (1943) as Anna Dalvig
- Elly Petersen (1944) as Elly Petersen
- Otte akkorder (1944) as Ellen
- To som elsker hinanden (1944) as Ellen Selstrup
- Den usynlige hær (1945) as Alice
- Soldaten og Jenny (1947) as Jenny Christensen
- John og Irene (1949) as Irene
- Din fortid er glemt (1949) as Anna
- Min kone er uskyldig (1950) as Betty Lund
- Mød mig på Cassiopeia (1951) as Musen Polyhymnia
- I den grønne skov (1968) as Mirjam
- The Missing Clerk (1971) as Mrs. Amsted
- Prins Piwi (1974) as Dronning Umulia (voice)
- Hjerter er trumf (1976) as Karen, Verner's mother
- Strømer (1976) as Sabine Lund
- Lille spejl (1978) as Bents mor Gloria Gibson
- Rend mig i traditionerne (1979) as Davids mor
- Babette's Feast (1987) as Filippa
- Pakten (1995) as Marianne Haas
- Bryggeren (1996–1997) as Caroline Jacobsen (4 episodes)
