= Hvedekorn =

Danish literary magazine

- Former editors: Poul Borum; Torben Brostrøm; Andreas Brøgger
- Categories: Literary magazine
- Frequency: Quarterly
- Founder: Knud Bruun-Rasmussen; Johannes Weltzer
- Founded: 1920; 105 years ago
- Country: Denmark
- Based in: Copenhagen
- Language: Danish
- ISSN: 0018-8093
- OCLC: 759700216

Hvedekorn (Danish: Grains of Wheat) is a Danish language literary magazine published in Copenhagen, Denmark, since 1920. It is one of the Danish publications which improved the cultural journalism in the country.

== History and profile ==
The magazine was established in 1920 under the name of Klinte. Its founders were the expressionist artists Knud Bruun-Rasmussen and Johannes Weltzer. It was published with this title for one year and was renamed as Ung dansk Litteratur and then as Vild Hvede. The latter title was adopted during the editorship of Viggo F. Møller from 1930. Halfdan Rasmussen and the cartoonist Ernst Clausen took over the editorship in 1952, and they renamed the magazine as Hvedekorn.

Hvedekorn is based in Copenhagen and is a literary magazine, specializing in poetry. Danish poets Inger Christensen and Marianne Larsen are among the contributors of the magazine. The other well-known contributors include Tom Kristensen and Tove Ditlevsen.

Poul Borum, a critic and poet, served as the editor-in-chief of Hvedekorn between 1968 and 1996. Another editor-in-chief was Torben Brostrøm. In 1996 Andreas Brøgger became its editor-in-chief.

The editorial staff of Hvedekorn has consisted of poetry editor Lars Bukdahl and art editor Christian Vind since 2008.

== See also ==
- List of magazines in Denmark
