= Alphabet (poetry collection) =

Book-length poem by Inger Christensen

- Author: Inger Christensen
- Original title: Alfabet
- Translator: Susanna Nied
- Language: Danish
- Publisher: Lyrikbogklubben Borgen, Gyldendal, New Directions
- Publication date: 1981
- Publication place: Denmark
- English publication date: 2001
- Pages: 77
- ISBN: 081121477X

Alphabet is one of the best-known poems of Inger Christensen, who was broadly considered to be Denmark's most prominent poet. The poem was originally published in 1981 in Danish as alfabet. An English-language translation by Susanna Nied won the American-Scandinavian PEN Translation Prize in 1982.

== Structure ==
"Alphabet" is a book-length poem following the tradition of Abecedarian poems, in which each line begins with the next letter of the alphabet sequentially from A through to N. Each of the fourteen sections of the poem corresponds to a letter of the alphabet, with line counts following the Fibonacci sequence is dictated by the Fibonacci sequence. (The first section, "A", has one line. The last section, "N", has 610.)

"Alphabet" has also been called a homonymous poem collection due to its focus on vowel and consonant sounds, and a "systematic" poem due to its rule-based structure. Note that systematic poetry is not a formal mode of poetry, but may be used to describe the writer's process.

== Themes ==
Alphabet deals with themes of nuclear war and ecological devastation.

As the poem progresses and each section lengthens, an increasing number of elements related to destruction, death, and ecological devastation are introduced. The sections progress through the alphabet, ending with "N", symbolizing nuclear destruction and implying an abrupt halt. The use of the Fibonacci sequence, Christensen later realised, was particularly appropriate for a plea that life can continue. "I found out after I had written alphabet that many plants follow these numbers. For example, sunflowers are ordered with the Fibonacci sequence – it's the way the seeds are placed."

== Reception ==
The book was reviewed in Publishers Weekly in 2001: "As used here with controlled repetitions, the [Fibonacci] sequence gives the whole an almost medieval sense of restriction. Abstracted cold war fears and post-'70s ecological concern and alienation give way to litanies of real world outrages ... which culminate in a post-nuclear holocaust nightmare, with birds and children somehow having survived in caves. The scenario may seem dated, but the threats remain very real, and Christensen's poetic appeal for sanity and humanity remains an abstracted call to action."

== See also ==
- 1981 in poetry
- Danish literature
