= Sophus Mads Jørgensen =

Danish chemist (1837–1914)

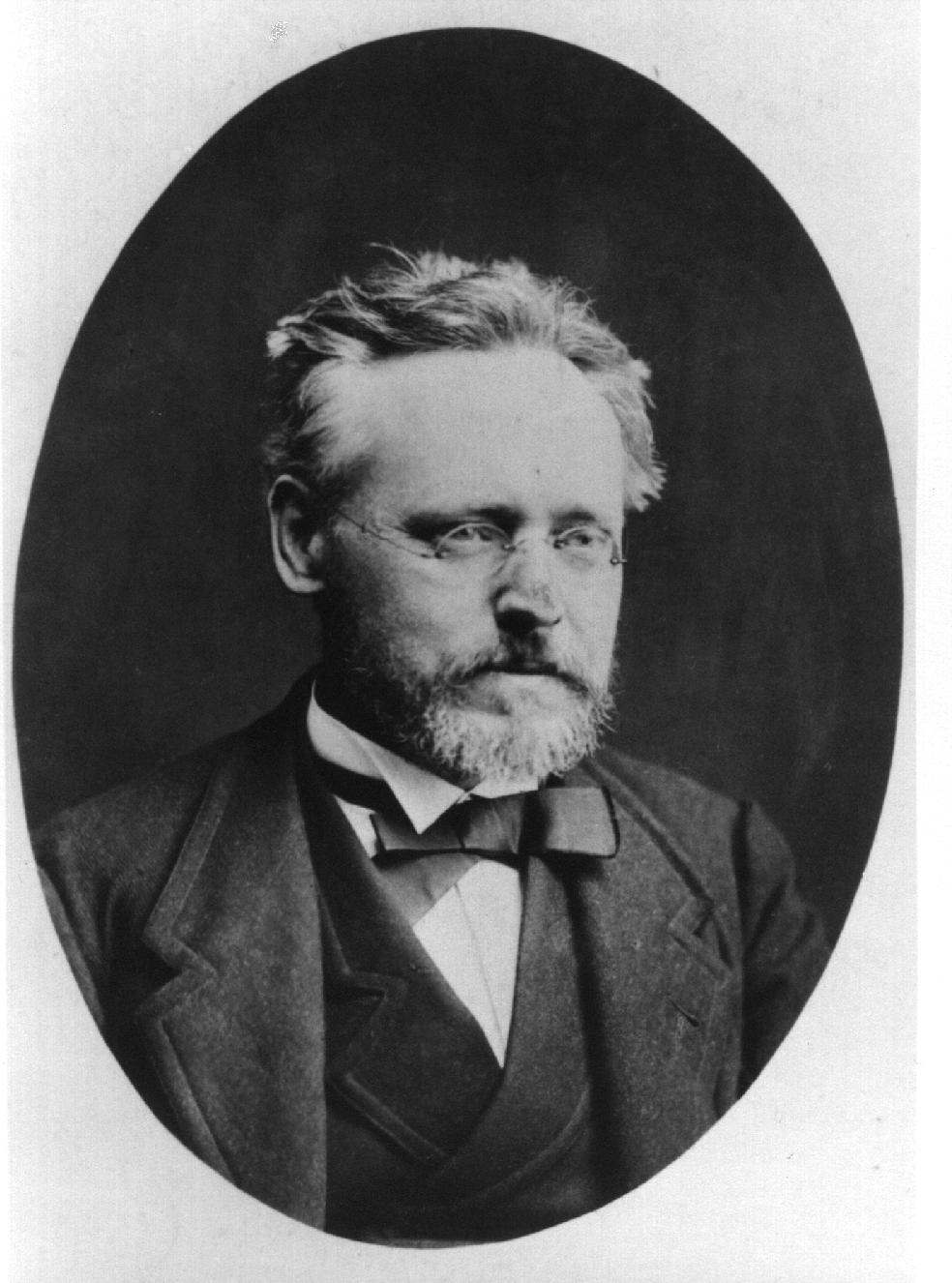

Sophus Mads Jørgensen (4 July 1837 – 1 April 1914) was a Danish chemist. He is considered one of the founders of coordination chemistry, mainly by being one of the pioneers of chain theory, and is known for the debates which he had with Alfred Werner during 1893–1899. While Jørgensen's theories on coordination chemistry were ultimately proven to be incorrect, his experimental work provided much of the basis for Werner's theories. Jørgensen also made major contributions to the chemistry of platinum and rhodium compounds.

Jørgensen was a board member of the Carlsberg Foundation from 1885 until his death in 1914, and was elected a member of the Royal Swedish Academy of Sciences in 1899. His son, Ove Jørgensen, became a classical scholar and later an authority on ballet, and co-edited Jørgensen's posthumously-published monograph, Det kemiske Syrebegrebs Udviklingshistorie indtil 1830 (Development History of the Chemical Concept of Acid until 1830).
