= Ruth Scodel =

American classical philologist (born 1952)

- Born: Columbus, Ohio, U.S.
- Awards: Gildersleeve Prize; Michigan Humanities Award

Academic background
- Education: University of California, Berkeley (BA); Harvard University (PhD)
- Thesis: The Trojan Trilogy of Euripides (1978)

Academic work
- Discipline: Classics
- Sub-discipline: Greek Literature
- Institutions: University of Edinburgh; University of Michigan; Harvard University

Ruth Scodel is an American classicist. She is the D.R. Shackleton-Bailey Collegiate Professor of Greek and Latin, Emerita at the University of Michigan. Scodel specialises in ancient Greek literature, with particular interests in Homer, Hesiod and Greek Tragedy. Her research has been influenced by narrative theory, cognitive approaches, and politeness theory. In 2024, she was elected to the American Philosophical Society.

== Career ==
Scodel studied at the University of California, Berkeley, where she received her B.A. in 1973. She obtained her Ph.D. at Harvard University in 1978. Her thesis was entitled The Trojan Trilogy of Euripides. From 1978–83 she was an assistant professor at Harvard University, and an associate professor from 1984–5.

Scodel joined the faculty of University of Michigan, Ann Arbor in 1984, where she became Professor of Greek and Latin in 1987. In 2005 Scodel was elected the D.R. Shackleton Bailey Professor of Greek Language and Literature. Scodel was the seventh A. G. Leventis Professor in Greek at the University of Edinburgh in 2011–12, and under these auspices held the conference 'What's Greek about Ancient Greek Narrative' from 27–30 October 2011.

Among other prizes for teaching and mentoring, Scodel won the Michigan Humanities Award (1997–98) and the Gildersleeve Prize (1998). She has been active in service to the Society for Classical Studies (formerly the American Philological Association). She was president of the Society in 2007, and has served on the Editorial Board for Monographs (1982–5), as Vice President for Publications (1996-9), and on the Nominating Committee (2008–14). She was honoured in 2018 with the "APA/SCS Distinguished Service Award", in recognition of the service to this organisation which she had carried out throughout her career. Scodel was president of the Classical Association of the Middle West and South from 2014–5. In 2017 Scodel was awarded the "Lifetime Achievement Award" by Eta Sigma Phi, the national Classics honorary society.

== Research ==
Scodel's research focuses on Homer, Hesiod and Greek tragedy, and is particularly significant in her innovative applications of theoretical approaches such as narrative theory to ancient literature. She has also written more introductory works such as her Introduction to Greek Tragedy, which was well received.

In 1998 Scodel's article “Bardic Performance and Oral Tradition in Homer,” won the Gildersleeve Prize (American Journal of Philology), for work described as "an important contribution not only to the reading of Homer but also to narratological theory".

== Selected works ==
Single-authored books

- The Trojan Trilogy of Euripides. Hypomnemata 60. Göttingen: Vandenhoeck und Ruprecht, 1980.
- Credible Impossibilities: Conventions and Strategies of Verisimilitude in Homer and Greek Tragedy. Beiträge zur Altertumswissenschaft 122. Suttgart: Teubner. 1999.
- Listening to Homer. Ann Arbor. University of Michigan Press. 2002.
- Epic Facework: Self-presentation and Social Interaction in Homer. Classical Press of Wales. 2008.
- An Introduction to Greek Tragedy. New York: Cambridge University Press. 2010.

Co-edited volumes

- Theater and Society in the Classical World. University of Michigan Press. Ann Arbor 1993.
- Defining Greek Narrative, with Douglas Cairns. Edinburgh University Press, 2014.
- Between Orality and Literacy: Communication and Adaptation in Antiquity. Brill, Leiden, 2014.
