= Havrebjerg =

- Village
- Location in Region Zealand
- Coordinates: 55°26′51″N 11°18′50″E
- Country: Denmark
- Region: Region Zealand
- Municipality: Slagelse

Population (2026)
  - Total: 376
- Time zone: UTC+1 (CET)
  - Summer (DST): UTC+2 (CEST)

Havrebjerg is a village on Zealand, Denmark. It is located in Slagelse Municipality.

== History ==
Maren Sørensen, considered to be the first female Danish priest, was ordained by Havrebjerg by the independent Grundtvigian priest Niels Dael in 1940.

A community freezer was built in the village in 1951. In 1977, when household freezers became more common, the community freezer was disestablished. The building today acts as a museum for local history. A new history may be written as a family on the edge of the village started a "Wine-factory" in the start of 2020. It has already been noticed by some shops that reached to sell them.

== Notable residents ==
- Søren Peter Lauritz Sørensen (1868–1939), chemist and inventor of the pH-scale.

== Gallery ==
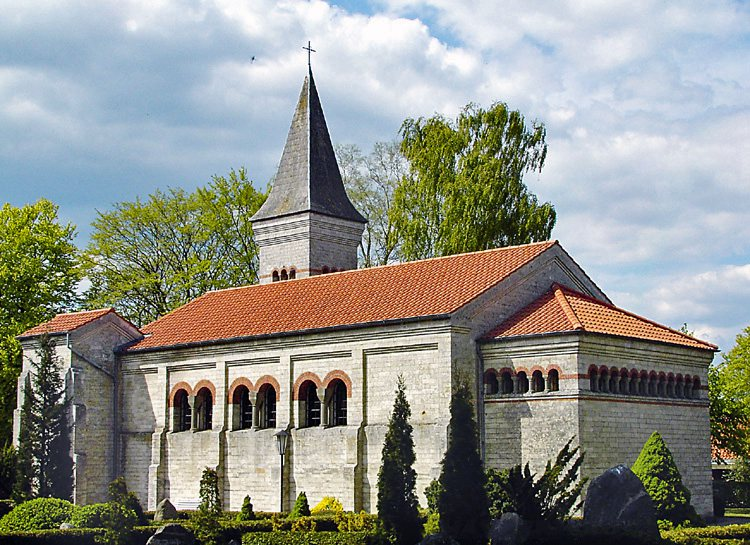
The independent church of Havrebjerg
