= Tamás Vető =

Hungarian-born Danish choral and opera conductor

Tamás Vető (born 1935) is a Hungarian-born Danish choral and opera conductor. He trained at the Budapest Conservatoire, then studied in France under Nadia Boulanger. He came to Denmark in 1957. He conducted Wagner's Der Ring des Niebelungen at the National Danish Opera in 1996. From 1996 to 2000 he was chief conductor of the vocal group Ars Nova Copenhagen.
