= American Journal of Philology =

- Discipline: Philology
- Language: English
- Edited by: Rosa Andújar

Publication details
- History: 1880–present
- Publisher: Johns Hopkins University Press (United States)
- Frequency: Quarterly
- Impact factor: 0.5 (2022)

Standard abbreviations
- ISO 4: Am. J. Philol.

Indexing
- ISSN: 0002-9475 (print); 1086-3168 (web)
- JSTOR: 00029475
- OCLC no.: 33891035

Links
- Journal homepage; Online access

The American Journal of Philology is a quarterly academic journal established in 1880 by the classical scholar Basil Lanneau Gildersleeve and published by the Johns Hopkins University Press. It covers the field of philology, and related areas of classical literature, linguistics, history, philosophy, and cultural studies. In 2003, the journal received the award for Best Single Issue from the Professional and Scholarly Publishing Division of the Association of American Publishers. The current editor-in-chief is Rosa Andújar. According to Journal Citation Reports, this journal has a 2022 impact factor of 0.5 The journal runs an annual prize for "the best article of the year", the Gildersleeve Prize.

== Editors-in-chief ==
Since its inception, the previous editors-in-chief have been:

- Basil Lanneau Gildersleeve (1880 - 1919)
- C.W.E. Miller (1920 - 1934)
- Benjamin Dean Meritt (1934 - 1935, 1943 - 1946)
- Tenney Frank (1936 - 1939)
- Harold Cherniss (1940 - 1942)
- Henry T. Rowell (1946 - 1971)
- Georg Luck (1972 - 1981, 1987 - 1989)
- Diskin Clay (1982 - 1986)
- George A. Kennedy (1990 - 1995)
- Philip A. Stadter (1996 - 2000)
- Barbara Gold (2001 - 2007)
- David H. J. Larmour (2008 - 2018)
- Joseph Farrell (2019 - 2023)
- Rosa Andújar (2024 - )

== Abstracting and indexing ==
This journal is indexed by the following services:

- Arts and Humanities Citation Index
- Current Contents
- Scopus
- Academic Search
- EBSCOhost
- Wiley-Blackwell Publishing (Linguistics Abstracts)
