= Johannes Weltzer =

Danish poet

Olympic medal record

Art competitions
Bronze medal – third place	1928 Amsterdam	Lyric works

Christian Johannes Weltzer (4 February 1900 – 3 September 1951) was a Danish poet. In 1928 he won a bronze medal in the art competitions of the Olympic Games for his "Symphonia Heroica" ("Heroic Symphony"). He cofounded a literary magazine, Klinte, in 1920 which was later renamed as Hvedekorn.
