= Philip A. Stadter =

American classical scholar (1936–2021)

Prof. Philip A. Stadter
- Born: November 29, 1936; Cleveland, Ohio
- Died: February 11, 2021 (aged 84); Pittsboro, North Carolina
- Occupation: Classical scholar
- Known for: Greek historiography

Academic background
- Education: A.B. (1958); Ph.D. (1962)
- Alma mater: Princeton University; Harvard University
- Thesis: 'The Mulierum Virtutes of Plutarch' (1962)

Academic work
- Discipline: Classicist
- Institutions: The University of North Carolina at Chapel Hill

Philip Austin Stadter (November 29, 1936 – February 11, 2021) was a leading American scholar of Greek historiography and an authority on the author Plutarch. Stadter was a long-time faculty member of The University of North Carolina at Chapel Hill.

== Education ==
Stadter earned his bachelor's degree at Princeton University in 1958 and then completed a doctorate in Classics at Harvard University in 1962. His Harvard dissertation -- The Mulierum Virtutes of Plutarch—was published in 1965 as Plutarch's Historical Methods: An Analysis of the Mulierum Virtutes.

== Career ==
In 1989-1990, Stadter held a fellowship at the National Humanities Center where he carried out a project entitled "Greek Historical Narrative and the Purpose of the Past".
