= Ib Nørholm =

Danish composer and organist (1931–2019)

Ib Nørholm (24 January 1931 – 10 June 2019) was a Danish composer and organist.

== Life and career ==
Nørholm was born in Søborg, Gladsaxe Municipality. He studied with Vagn Holmboe at the Royal Danish Academy of Music, where he later taught (from 1973), becoming a professor in 1981. Among the honours Nørholm has received are the Gaudeamus International Composers Award in 1964, the Carl Nielsen Prize in 1971 and a knighthood in 1981.

Initially, Nørholm's music was in the tradition of Carl Nielsen, as exemplified by his first symphony (1956–8). In the 1960s, however, Nørholm began to explore the possibilities of serialism and graphic scores, having been deeply impressed by his experiences of the music of Karlheinz Stockhausen, Pierre Boulez, and others at the ISCM in Cologne. Later still his music took on a more economical approach, often characterised by the term 'new simplicity'.

Compositions by Nørholm include the opera The Young Park (1969–70), Symphony No. 3 (1973), sonatas for accordion (1967) and guitar (1976), Idylles d'Apocalypse for organ and orchestra (1980), Symphony No. 5 'The Elements' (1980), Immanence for solo flute (1983), Aspects of Sand and Simplicity for string orchestra (1987), a symphonic fantasy Hearing Andersen (1987), and the choral work Sjaelfuld Sommer (1997). The opera Invitation til Skafottet ("Invitation to a Beheading") (1965) was commissioned by the Danish Broadcasting Corporation. In all Nørholm has written twelve symphonies. His second symphony, commissioned by the Danish National Symphony Orchestra is subtitled Isola Bella, and the fourth symphony is subtitled Moderskabelsen ("Mother Creation"). The première of his twelfth symphony, Virkeligheder on texts by Thorkild Bjørnvig, Lene Henningsen and Inger Christensen, took place in Odense on 28 April 2011.

In addition to his activities as a composer, Nørholm was a prolific music critic and choral conductor. He died on 10 June 2019, aged 88.

== Selected works ==
=== Orchestral music ===
- Thirteen symphonies (1956–58, 1968–71, 1973, 1978–79, 1980–81, 1981, 1982, 1990, 1990, 1998, 2008, 2009, 2013)
- Concerto for violin and orchestra (1974)
- Concerto for cello and orchestra (1989)

=== Chamber music ===
- Mosaic: Recitative Fragments, op. 15 (1959) for flute, violin, viola and cello
- Varianter, op. 19 (1959) for violin and piano
- Præludium til min vintermorgen (Prelude to my Winter Morning), op. 52 (1971) for flute, violin, viola, cello and piano
- Kontrast-Kontinuum, op. 70 (1977) for flute quartet
- Så at sige (So to Say), op. 74 (1978) for flute and percussion
- Essai prismatique, op. 77 (1979) for violin, cello and piano
- Before Silence, op. 83 (1980) for flute trio
- Den ortodokse drøm (The Orthodox Dream), op. 92 (1984) for flute, cello and harpsichord
- Medusa's Shadow, op. 105 (1987) for flute, guitar, viola and cello
- Saxophone Quartet (1992)
- Nu og Da (2000–01) for voices and string quartet
- Jubilate Deo in Primavere (2005) for flute, saxophone and percussion

=== Songs ===
- 3 Songs, Op. 3b : No. 1 Critique Of Gold No. 2 The Condemned Speak Of Their Country No. 3 Pictures, Pictures, Pictures

=== Solo instrumental music ===
- Sonata No. 1, op. 69 (1976) for guitar
- Turbulens-Laminar, op. 93 (1984) for piano
- Sonata No. 2, op. 110 (1989) for guitar
- A Song of Breath and Wings (2002) for clarinet
