= Niels Rosing-Schow =

Danish composer

Niels Rosing-Schow (born 1954, in Copenhagen) is a Danish composer. He was a student of Ib Nørholm.
