= Svend Nielsen (composer) =

Danish composer

Svend Nielsen (born 20 April 1937) is a modern Danish composer. He was a student of Vagn Holmboe, Finn Høffding and Per Nørgård. His inspirations are Nørgård, Ravel and Debussy.

== Works ==
- Sinfonia concertante (1994) for cello solo and ensemble (20')
- Violinkoncert (1985) for violin and orchestra (25’)

=== Orchestral songs ===
- Akustisk Regnbue ("Acoustic Rainbow," 2002) for alto voice and Concert Band (17') to text by Pia Tafdrup.
- Ekbátana (2006) for soprano and orchestra (15') to text by Sophus Claussen.
- Kammerkantate ("Chamber cantata," 1975) for soprano and ensemble (20’) to text by Jørgen Leth.
- Svinedrengen ("The Swineherd," 2003) for narrator, soprano and baritone, children's choir and orchestra (25') to text by H. C. Andersen.

=== Vocal ===
- Dreamsongs (1988) for soprano, alto flute, electric guitar and cello (12’)
- Opstigning mod Akseki (1979) for soprano, vibraphone or violin and guitar (8’)
- På bunden af min drøm (1993) for mezzo-soprano, clarinet, piano and cello (18') to text by Pia Tafdrup
- Ritorneller (1994) for soprano and 2 guitars (10’) to text by Emil Aarestrup (10’)
- Sommerfugledalen "Butterfly valley" (Part 1 1998 / Part 2 2004) for chamber choir (12 solo voices) (40’) to text by Inger Christensen
- Sonnetts of Time (1978) for soprano, flute, guitar, violin and cello (14’)
- Så stille (1986) for alto voice, alto flute, vibraphone, guitar and cello to text by Gustav Munch-Petersen
