= Argonautica =

Greek epic poem dated to the 3rd century BC

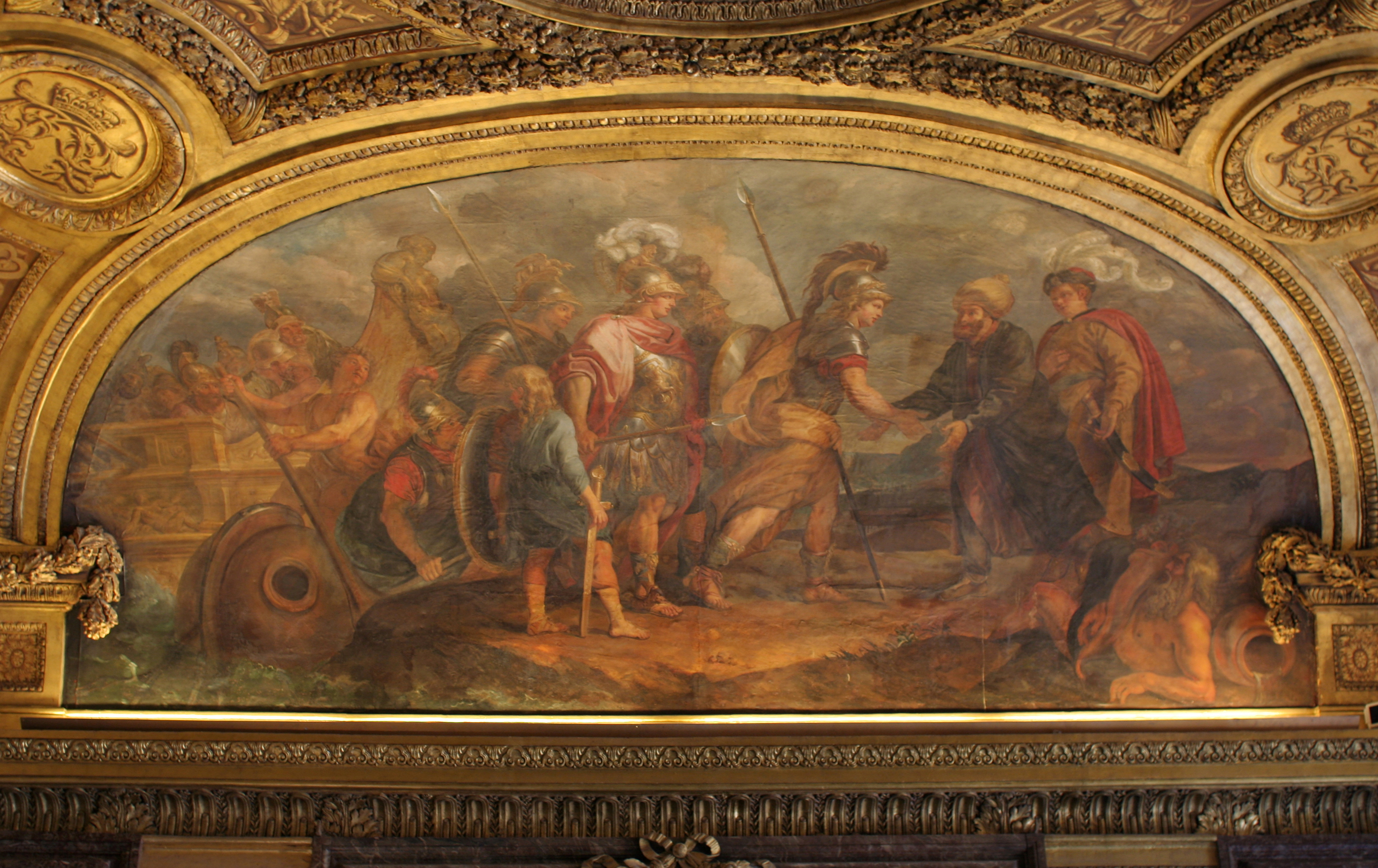
Jason and the Argonauts Arriving at Colchis, by Charles de La Fosse. The poem Argonautica was written specifically for Ptolemaic Alexandria, but it has long been a resource for other dynasties seeking to illustrate their power and ambitions. This painting is located in the Château de Versailles.

The Argonautica (Greek: Ἀργοναυτικά, romanized: Argonautika) is a Greek epic poem written by Apollonius Rhodius in the 3rd century BC. The only entirely surviving Hellenistic epic (though Callimachus's Aetia is substantially extant through fragments), the Argonautica tells the myth of the voyage of Jason and the Argonauts to retrieve the Golden Fleece from remote Colchis. Their heroic adventures and Jason's relationship with the Colchian princess/sorceress Medea were already well known to Hellenistic audiences, which enabled Apollonius to go beyond a simple narrative, giving it a scholarly emphasis suitable to the times. His epic incorporates his research in geography, ethnography, comparative religion, and Homeric literature. However, his main contribution to the epic tradition lies in his development of the love between hero and heroine – he seems to have been the first narrative poet to study "the pathology of love". His Argonautica had a profound impact on Latin poetry: it was translated by Varro Atacinus and imitated by Valerius Flaccus, it influenced Catullus and Ovid, and it provided Virgil with a model for his Roman epic, the Aeneid.

== Background ==
The Argonautica was an adventure for the poet, one of the major scholars of the Alexandrian period – it was a bold experiment in re-writing Homeric epic in a way that would meet the demanding tastes of his contemporaries. According to some accounts, a hostile reception even led to Apollonius's exile to Rhodes. The literary fashion was for small, meticulous poems, featuring displays of erudition and paradoxography (the account of marvels and oddities), as represented by the work of Callimachus. In adapting the epic genre to this audience, Apollonius went a long way towards inventing the romance novel, including narrative techniques like the "interior monologue", whereby the author identifies with a character's thoughts and feelings. The re-evaluation of his work in recent times has led to a mass of innovative studies, often jostling each other for attention, so that Argonautica has become a daunting adventure for many modern scholars too:

Scholars that row against this current feel as if they are sailing through the Clashing Rocks; they have barely struggled halfway through one wave and there rolls the next one tossing them backwards twice as far as they had progressed ... Even if the attempt to pass through the clashing mountain of books succeeds, there is no hope of a pause and scholars find themselves in the grip of a debilitating Ancient Greek: ἀμηχανία [helplessness].

— Reinhold F. Glei.

Since scholarship is a key feature of this unique story, here is a preview of some of the main issues in the poet's treatment of the Argonaut myth, as addressed by recent scholarship. (Note: The issues are identified by R. Glei, Outlines of Apollonian Scholarship 1955–1999, 4–19)

=== Some issues ===
- A "Callimachian epic"? Callimachus set the standards for Hellenistic aesthetics in poetry and, according to ancient sources, he engaged in a bitter literary feud with Apollonius. Modern scholars generally dismiss these sources as unreliable and point to similarities in the poetry of the two men. Callimachus, for example, composed a book of verses dealing with aitia, the mythical origins of contemporary phenomena. According to one survey, there are eighty aitia in Argonautica. (Note: The survey was by S. Valverde (1989), El aition en las 'Argonáuticas' de Apolonio de Rodas: estudio literario, Diss. Murcia, cited by A. Köhnken, Theocritus, Callimachus, and Apollonius Rhodius, 79) Yet Argonautica is clearly intended to be fundamentally Homeric and therefore seems at odds with the fashionable poetics of Callimachus.
- The epic hero? Addressing the issue of heroism in Argonautica, the German classicist H. Fränkel once noted some unheroic characteristics of Jason and his crew. In particular, their frequent moods of despair and depression, summed up in the word helplessness (Ancient Greek: ἀμηχανία). By contrast, the bullying Argonaut Idas seemed to Fränkel an ugly example of the archaic warrior. It looks as if Apollonius meant to underscore the obsolescence of traditional heroism in the Hellenistic period. These arguments have caused much discussion among scholars about the treatment and nature of heroism in Argonautica. (Note: Fränkel H. (1957), "Das Argonautenepos des Apollonios", MH 14, 1–19; and (1960), Ein Don Quijote unter den Argonauten des Apollonios, MH 17, 1–20). (The two articles are cited by R. Glei, Outline of Apollinian Scholarship 1955–1999, 6))
- Characters without character? Another fruitful discussion gained impetus from an article by D. A. Van Krevelen, who dismissed all the characters, apart from Medea, as flimsy extras without any interesting qualities. (Note: Van Krevelen D. A. (1956), "Bemerkungen zur Charakteristik der in den 'Argonautica' des Apollonios auftretenden Personen," RhM 99, 3–8 (the article is cited by R. Glei, Outline of Apollinian Scholarship 1955–1999))
- An "episodic epic"? In addition to aitia, Argonautica incorporates descriptions of wonders and marvels, and digressions associated with Hellenistic "science", including geography, ethnography, anthropology and comparative religion. So the question arises: is the poem a unified narrative, or is the epic plot merely a coathanger for erudite and colourful episodes?

==== Date of the poem ====
There is some dispute about the date when the poem was originally published. It could have been during the reign of Ptolemy II Philadelphus (283–246 BC), or a generation later.

According to the astronomical analysis of the poem by Jackie Murray, the poem commemorates the year 238 BC, implying that it was published at the time of Ptolemy III Euergetes (246–221 BC) as the majority of ancient sources claim.

==== Sources ====
Apollonius's Argonautica was based on multiple ancient sources, including Homer and Pindar.

The story of the expedition seems to have been known to the author of the Odyssey (xii. 69, &c.), who states, that the ship Argo was the only one that ever passed between the whirling rocks (petrai planktai Πλαγκταὶ; Planctae, after the encounter with the Clashing Rocks). Jason is mentioned several times in the Iliad (vii. 467, &c., xxi. 40, xxiii. 743, &c.), but not as the leader of the Argonauts. Hesiod (Theog. 992, &c.) relates the story of Jason saying that he fetched Medea at the command of his uncle Pelias, and that she bore him a son, Medeius, who was educated by Cheiron. The first trace of the common tradition that Jason was sent to fetch the Golden Fleece from Aea, the city of Aeëtes, in the eastern boundaries of the Earth, occurs in Mimnermus (Strabo, Geography, 1.2.40), a contemporary of Solon; but the most ancient detailed account of the expedition of the Argonauts which is extant is that of Pindar (Pythian Odes iv.)

— William Smith, Argonautae, A Dictionary of Greek and Roman biography and mythology

== Plot ==
=== Book 1 ===
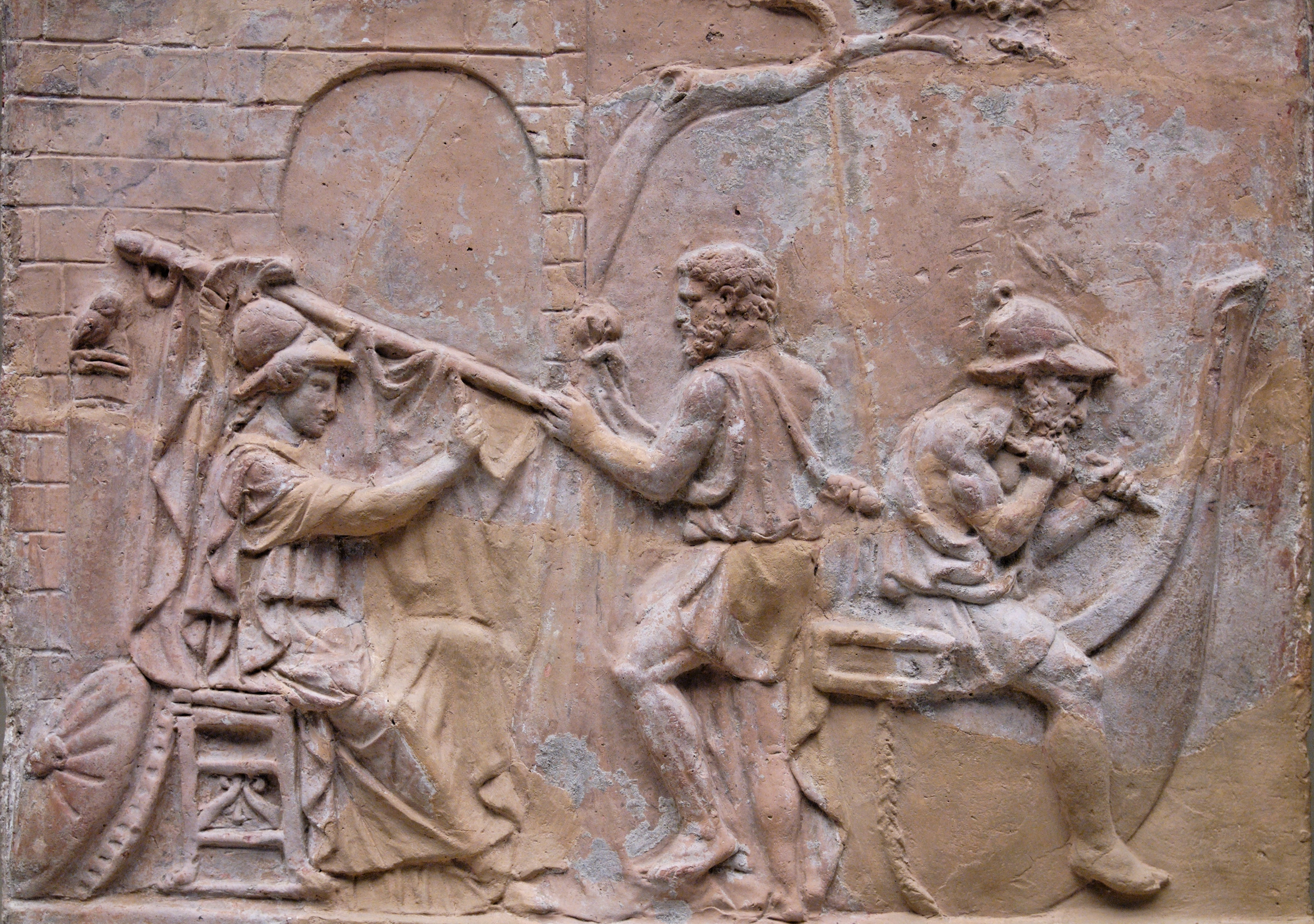
Athena helps build the Argo; Roman moulded terracotta plaque, first century AD.

The poem begins with an invocation to Apollo and briefly recounts his prophetic warning to Pelias, king of Iolcus, that his downfall will be the work of a man with only one sandal. Jason has recently emerged as the man in question, having lost a sandal while crossing a swollen stream. Consequently, Pelias has entrusted him with a suicidal mission to Colchis to bring back the Golden Fleece. A ship, the Argo, has already been constructed by Argus, a shipwright working under Athena's instructions. Meanwhile, a band of heroes has arrived to help in the venture. The locals marvel at such a gathering – young Jason has been given an impossible mission yet this band of heroes just might help him pull it off. His mother fears the worst. He bids her to stay strong and calm.

Jason urges the heroes to elect a leader for the voyage. They all nominate Heracles. Heracles however insists on Jason as leader and the others submit to this choice. Rejoicing in his election, Jason orders the crew to haul the ship down to the water. The Argo is then moored for the night so that they can enjoy a farewell feast. Two bulls are sacrificed to Apollo, wine flows and conversation becomes animated. Jason however becomes withdrawn and glum. One of the heroes, Idas, accuses him of cowardice; the prophet Idmon in turn accuses Idas of drunken vainglory. A fight almost breaks out but Orpheus soothes everyone with a song about the cosmos and how the gods and all things were created. At dawn, Tiphys, the ship's helmsman, rouses the crew. The ship itself calls to them, since its keel includes a magical beam of Dodonian oak. The shore cables are loosed. Jason sheds a tear as they pull away from his home, Iolcus. The oars churn up the sea, wielded by heroic hands in time to Orpheus's stirring music. Soon the eastern coast of Thessaly is left behind.

The first major port they reach is Lemnos, where the women, led by their Queen Hypsipyle, have recently murdered all their menfolk, including husbands, sons, brothers and fathers. (Note: Only Hypsipyle's father was spared, cast adrift in a wooden chest) The all-female parliament decides that the heroes should be encouraged to stay. Jason, as leader, is summoned and he goes to town wrapped in a magnificent cloak made for him by Athena. Hypsipyle falls in love on the spot and he settles into the palace. His crew is taken home by the other women – all but Heracles and some comrades, who prefer to stay with the ship. Thus the voyage is postponed day after day. Finally Heracles assembles all the Argonauts for a strong talk. He tells them that they are not behaving like heroes and the Golden Fleece won't bring itself back to Greece. Thus chastised, they immediately prepare to leave. Jason tells the queen that, if she bears him a son, she should send him to his parents when he reaches maturity. He is the first back on board when the Argo sets sail again.

Traveling through the Hellespont, they reach an island/peninsula that is home to savage Earth-born men, the Gegenees (Γηγενέες), with six arms each. Their neighbours are the Doliones, a civilized people descended from Poseidon. The savages are hostile but the Argonauts receive a friendly welcome from Cyzicus, the newly wed king of the Doliones who is, like Jason, in his adolescence. The 6-armed giants hurl rocks at the Argonauts but Heracles destroys them all. However, the Argonauts and Doliones end up fighting each other in the dark, mistaking one another for enemies. Cyzicus is killed by Jason. His widow Cleite hangs herself in despair. Shared grief and a magnificent funeral reconcile the two sides. Meanwhile, the Argonauts are kept there by adverse winds. Finally the seer Mopsus learns from omens that they are meant to establish a cult of the mother of the gods (Rhea/Cybele). (Note: The mother of the gods, Rhea, is associated with Cybele, the rites being established on a Cyzicus mountain, Dindymum (not to be confused with Dindymon in central Phrygia) – W. Race, Apollonius Rhodius: Argonautica, 91) The cult is soon established, the weather changes for the better and the Argonauts set off again.

Their next landfall is in Mysia, where Heracles's handsome young companion Hylas is abducted by a water nymph while filling an urn at her spring. Heracles and his comrade Polyphemus are still searching for him when the rest of the Argonauts set sail again. When at last the absences are noticed, Telamon accuses Jason of leaving Heracles behind on purpose. Just then the sea divinity Glaucus emerges from the depths, assuring them that the loss of their three crewmen is the work of the gods. He vanishes back into the water and they continue the voyage without their three comrades.

=== Book 2 ===
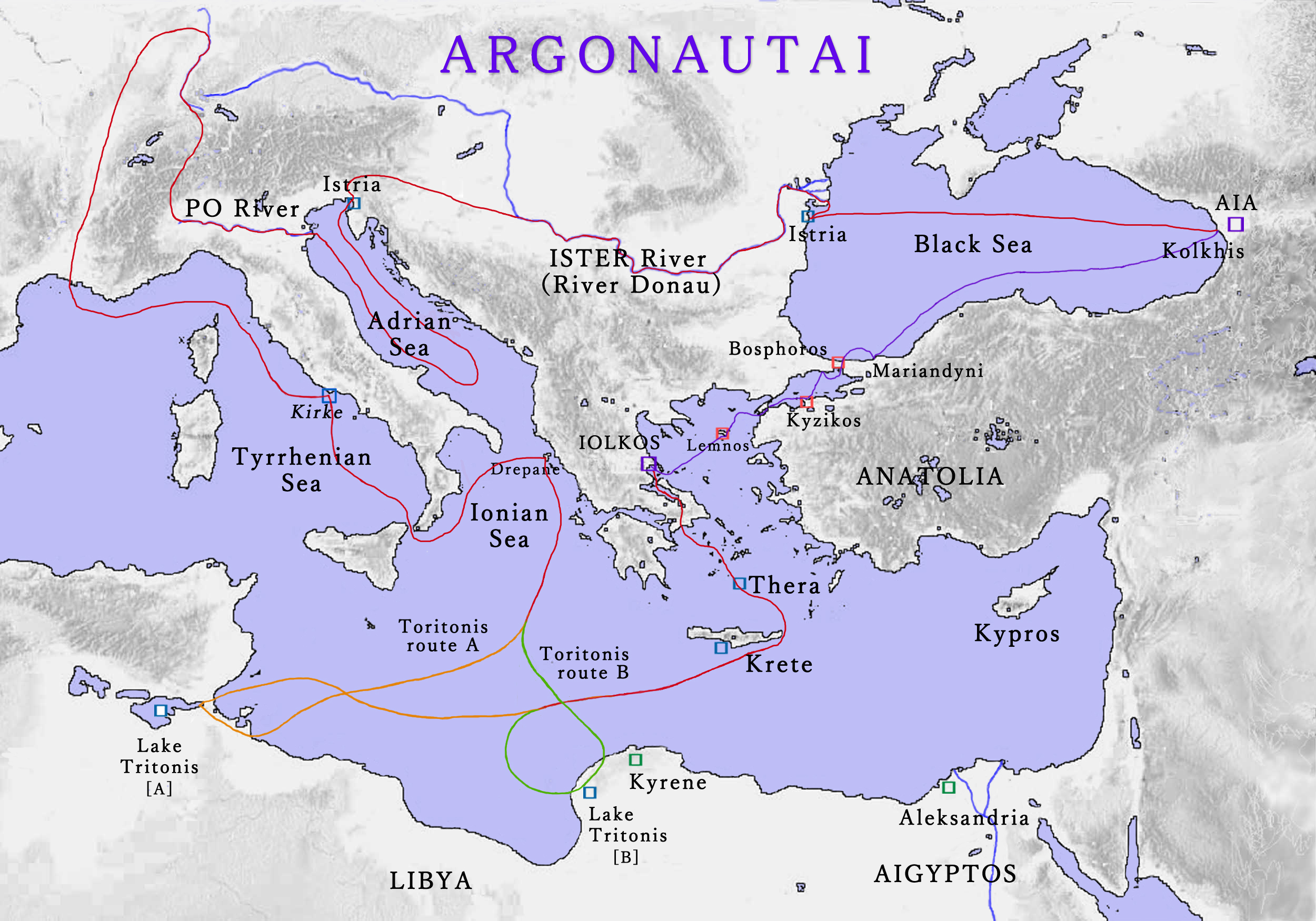
Map showing the route taken by the Argo. Therer are two possible locations for "Lake Triton".

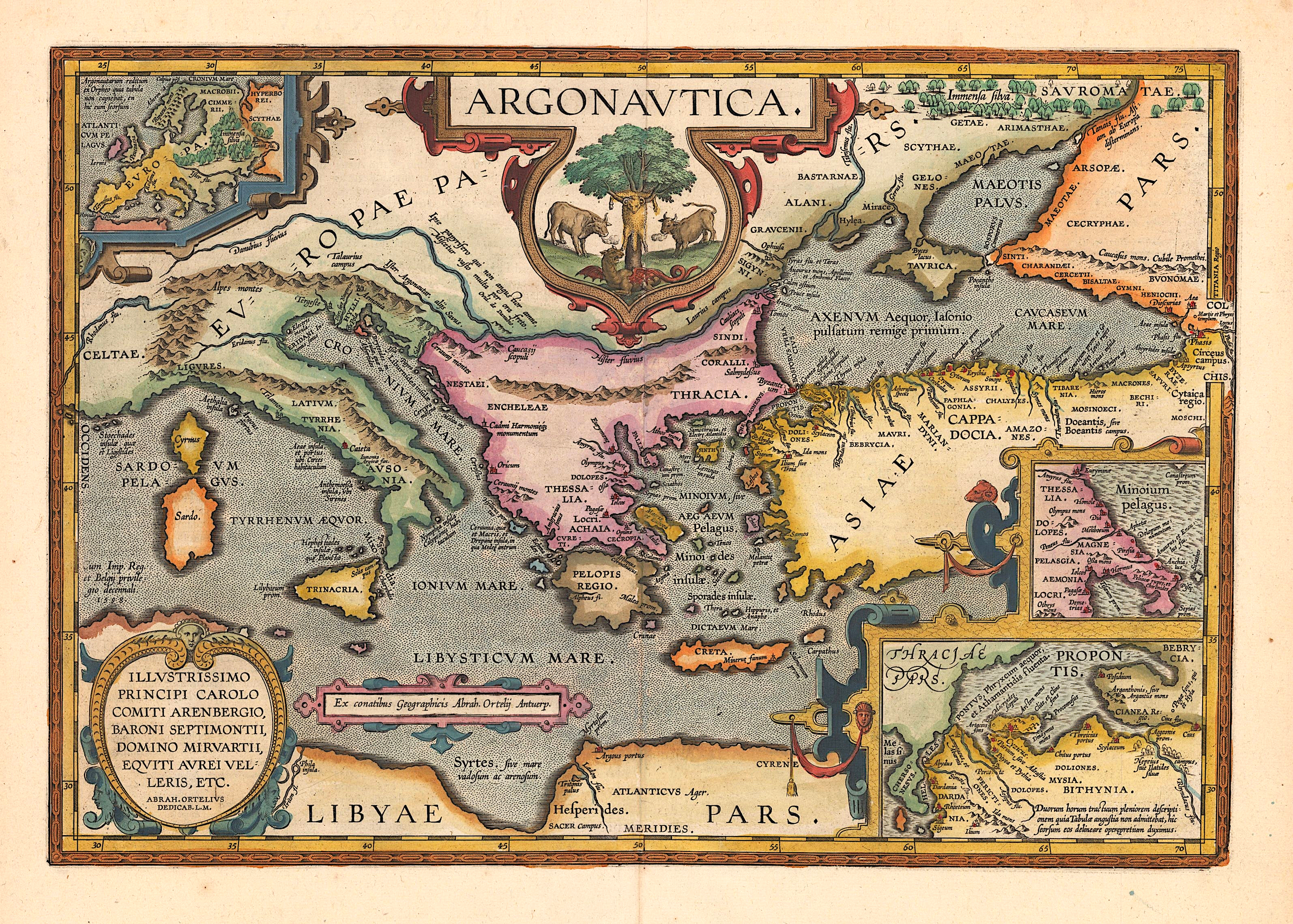
Map interpreting the voyage according to Apollonius Rhodius's Argonautica, reprint of Ortelius's Parergon, 1624

The Argonauts reach a gulf in the Propontis, home to the Bebrycians, whose king Amycus demands a boxing match with the champion of these "sea-wanderers" (Ancient Greek: ἁλίπλαγκτοι). He does this with all travellers and he doesn't even ask who they are. Angered by such disrespect, Polydeukes volunteers and the fight begins. Amycus is a man-mountain but the young Argonaut is skilled with his fists and eventually lands a lethal blow. The Bebrycians rush on the victor, weapons drawn, but they are intercepted and chased off by his rampant crewmates. Some sheep are herded on board and the Argo leaves the following day. Their next stop is on the opposite coast, near the home of Phineus, once a king of the Thynians. He too doesn't ask who these travellers are. He already knows. His powers of prophecy are so great that Zeus has punished him for giving away divine secrets, afflicting him with extreme old age, blindness and daily visits from the harpies. Jason and the Argonauts are destined to rescue him from the harpies and thus he welcomes them as his deliverers. Zetes and Calais, sons of the north wind, duly chase the pests away, and the blind old man gratefully reveals the safest route to Colchis and how best to sail past the Clashing Rocks.

Passing through the Clashing Rocks (thanks to the advice of Phineus, the pilot skills of Tiphys, and the aid of Athena), they enter the Black Sea and arrive at a deserted island, Thynias, where they observe Apollo flying overhead on his way north to visit the Hyperboreans. The island shakes with his passing. There they build an altar and a shrine (lasting memorials of their voyage). Next stop is an outlet of the river Acheron, one of the entries to Hades, where they meet Lycus, king of the Mariandynians and an enemy to the now defunct king of the Bebrycians. He receives them very hospitably. Their departure is delayed when the prophet Idmon is killed by a wild boar and Tiphys dies of illness. Two tombs are built (some more lasting memorials of their voyage) and the Argonauts set off again.

Their next two landfalls bring them into contact with some old comrades of Heracles, left behind after his campaign against the Amazons. One is Sthenelus, whose ghost beckons to them from his tomb by the sea, and the others are three men stranded at Sinope. The Argonauts pour libations to the ghost of Sthenelus and the three survivors gain places aboard the Argo. They arrive next at the river Thermodon, where the Amazons have their harbour, and they leave the next day before the women can assemble for battle. The Amazon influence however reaches even to the deserted Island of Ares, where they have built a temple to the god of war. When the Argonauts arrive, it is only defended by birds. They fight off the birds and then chance upon four survivors of a shipwreck. These are the four sons of the exiled Greek hero, Phrixus, and they are also grandsons of Aeëtes, king of Colchis. Jason welcomes them as god-sent allies in his quest for the Golden Fleece.

Approaching Colchis, the Argonauts see the eagle of Zeus flying to and from the Caucasus mountains, where it feeds on the liver of Prometheus. It glides through the air as large as another ship, disturbing the Argo's sails as it passes overhead. (There could be a discrepancy in timing between myths. Heracles joined the Argonauts after completing some of his labors, but the eagle was killed and Prometheus was freed by Heracles during his fourth labor.) Soon after, the heroes enter the Phasis, the main river of Colchis, and furtively anchor in a backwater.

=== Book 3 ===
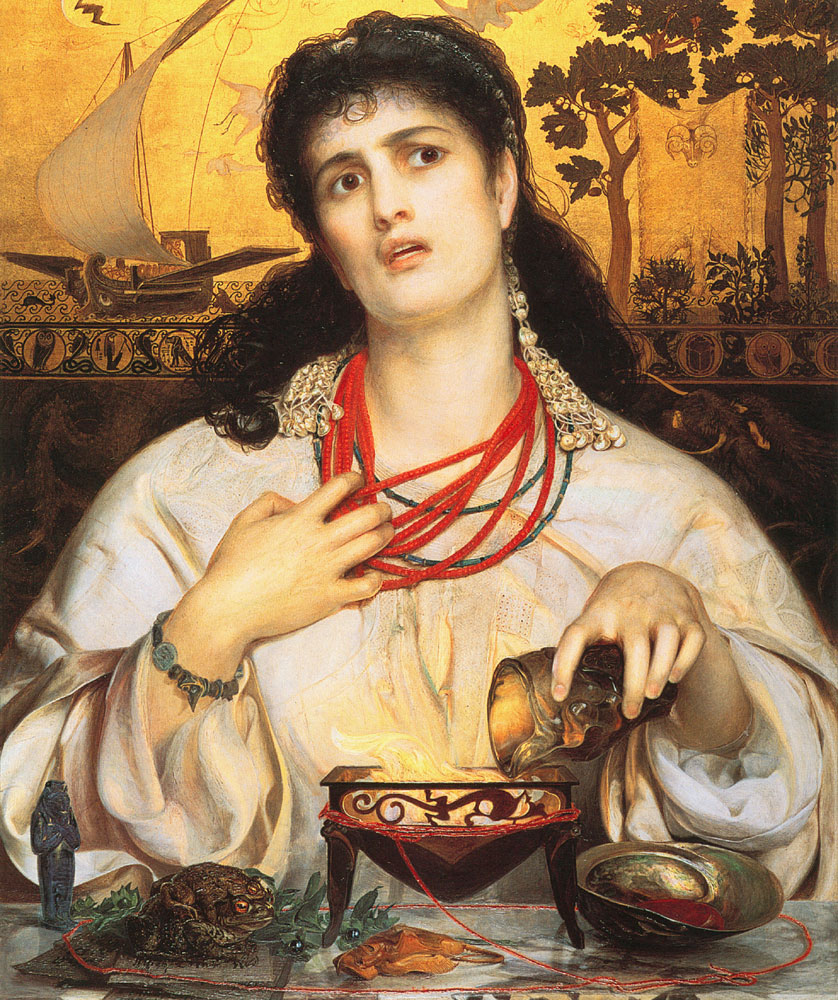
In Medea, a conflicted Medea is shown mixing a potion for an incantation, c. 1867 by Frederick Sandys

The third book begins by invoking Erato, the Muse of love poetry. The Argo is still hidden in a Colchis backwater when the goddesses Hera and Athena retire to a private room on Olympus to consider in secret how best to help Jason. Hera thinks the daughter of the Colchian king might prove useful if she could be made to fall in love with him. She then suggests enlisting the help of Aphrodite. Athena likes the plan but, being a virgin conscious of appearances, asks Hera to do all the talking. They find the goddess of love indolently combing her hair in her apartment. She has been bickering with her young son Eros and doubts if the unruly child will fire any arrows at Medea just to please her. Hera, an experienced mother, advises her to avoid quarrels with the boy and Aphrodite subsequently buys his support with the gift of a fabulous ball, composed of gold and intricately fashioned so as to leave a trail like a falling star when thrown at the sky.

Jason advises his comrades that they should try persuasion before attempting to take the Golden Fleece by force and then he leads Phrixus's sons home to the palace of Aeëtes. Their unexpected arrival is greeted by Medea with a cry that brings everyone running, including her sister Chalciope (mother of the four castaways) and Aeëtes, the king. Meanwhile, Eros invisibly joins the throng, squats at Jason's feet and fires off the fateful arrow, departing then with a laugh. Medea's heart floods with the sweet pain of love. Aeëtes however is filled with rage when his grandsons ask him to hand the Golden Fleece to Jason for return to Iolcus. He accuses them of conspiring with foreigners to steal away his kingdom. Jason delivers a soothing speech and Aeëtes responds with a mock compromise – he can have what he came for if he first ploughs the Plain of Ares with fire-breathing oxen, next sows four acres with dragon's teeth and finally cuts down the crop of armed men before they can cut him down. It's a task that Aeëtes, son of the Sun (Helios), has often performed. Jason accepts the challenge reluctantly. He sets off for the ship to inform his crew and Medea's thoughts flutter at his departing heels (νόος ... ἑρπύζων πεπότητο μετ' ἴχνια), torn between love and anguish.

That night, in a dream, she envisions herself performing Jason's task for him. She wakes fearing the wrath of Aeëtes and the danger to her reputation if she helps Jason without good cause. The safety of her sister's four sons depends on his success. She wonders if Chalciope can be enticed into asking her to help Jason for their sake. Even this seems too bold for a young virgin and finally she surrenders to sobs of dismay. Her sister comes in response to the noise. Medea tells her that she is worried about her nephews, since they are doomed if the stranger fails. Chalciope then asks her to help Jason and Medea gladly agrees. Alone in her room again, she continues to be torn between hope and fear. She contemplates suicide, opens her chest of drugs looking for poison but instead selects a drug that will help Jason in his trial of strength.

Arrangements for a secret meeting are made. The tryst is outside a temple of Hecate, where Medea is the priestess. At first they are as speechless as lofty pines rooted together on a mountainside, until the force of love comes like a sudden gust of wind. He reminds her that he is utterly at her mercy and he promises to make her famous throughout Greece if she assists him. She draws the drug out from between her breasts and hands it to him. If he ever forgets her kindness, she warns him, she will fly to Greece on the wind and there rebuke him to his face. He urges her to forget the wind and sail back with him instead, as his future wife. She doesn't commit herself to anything and returns home as if in a dream. He returns to the crew, welcomed by all but Idas, who considers his reliance on a woman's help to be unheroic.

The day of trial arrives and so do the people of Colchis, gathering on the hillsides as spectators. Aeëtes rides about in his chariot, glorying in his own magnificence. The Argo comes upstream and moors by the river's edge. Jason steps forward. Secretly fortified by Medea's spells, he manhandles the monstrous oxen and sows the deadly field with teeth. He pauses briefly for a drink then, cheered on by his comrades, returns to the scene of action, where an army of men is springing from the broken soil, ready to attack him. These he routs single-handedly, relying on a trick taught him by Medea (he throws a rock among the soldiers, causing them to fight and kill each other). Dumbfounded, Aeëtes returns to the palace, all the while wondering how best to cheat Jason of his promised reward.

=== Book 4 ===
The poet calls upon the Muse to describe Medea's state of mind: is it shame, alarm, or love that leads her to flee Colchis? Her treason is already known to her father and self-poisoning seems like an option again. She decides instead to flee Colchis with her nephews, the sons of Phrixus, camped with the Argonauts by the river. Doors open for her by magic as she hurries barefoot though the palace, and the moon laughs at her outdoors, recalling the many times that she was captured and brought to earth by Medea's cruel love spells (a reference to the moon's passion for Endymion). Arriving at the camp, Medea warns the others about her father's treachery and offers to help steal the Golden Fleece from its guardian serpent. Jason solemnly pledges to marry her, she puts the snake to sleep with a spell and then the hero takes the Fleece back to the Argo, exulting in its sheen like a young girl who has caught moonbeams in the folds of her gown.

The fugitive Argo is pursued by two Colchian fleets, ships numerous as flocking birds. One of the fleets sails into the Propontis through the now-motionless Clashing Rocks. The second is led by Medea's half-brother, Apsyrtus, and it takes the same route as the Argo, up the river Ister (Danube). A distant branch of the river eventually leads the Argonauts into the Sea of Cronus (Adriatic), where Apsyrtus finally corners them on the Brygean Islands. Peace talks result in a deal – Jason can keep the fleece, since he won it after all, but Medea's fate must be decided by a mediator chosen from the neighbouring kings. Fearing the worst, Medea comes up with an alternative plan. She lures Apsyrtus into a trap with promises of rewards. Jason murders him and the body is dismembered to avoid retribution from the Erinyes. The leaderless Colchians are easily outwitted and, rather than return home empty-handed to a wrathful Aeëtes, they disperse and settle around the nearby coast.

Indignant at the brutal murder, Zeus condemns the Argonauts to wander homeless for a longer term. A gale blows them back north and they enter the river Eridanus (Po), whose different branches eventually bring them into the Sardinian Sea (Gulf of Lion), on the western side of Ausonia (Italy). Here the enchantress Circe absolves the lovers of blood-guilt. Meanwhile, Hera has a friendly chat with the sea nymph Thetis. The goddess advises the nymph that her infant son Achilles is destined to marry Medea in the Elysian fields and then she sends her on an errand to secure the Argo's passage south. The Argonauts safely pass the Sirens, whose song though not more melodious than Orpheus's music causes Butes to fall overboard; they get past the Wandering Rocks, from which the Argo is saved by the Nereids, like girls on the beach passing a ball to and fro. Thus the Argonauts arrive at Drepane (Corfu) off the western coast of Greece. It is here they encounter the other Colchian fleet. Alcinous, the virtuous king of Drepane, offers to mediate between the two sides, later confiding in his virtuous wife, Arete, that he means to surrender Medea to the Colchians, unless she happens to be married. The queen reveals this to the lovers and they are duly married in a sacred cave on the island, where the bridal bed is draped with the Golden Fleece. Disappointed, the Colchians follow the example of the first fleet and settle nearby rather than return home.

The Argonauts can't return home either: another gale drives them off course, this time south towards the Syrtes, an interminable sandbank off Libya. Here they can see no means of escape and they resign themselves to an inglorious end, parting from each other to die in private, while Medea and her maids lament their fate in a forlorn group. Jason's isolation soon ends with a visit by three nymphs, the guardians of Libya, with mysterious instructions about how to survive. Peleus interprets the instructions on his behalf: they must carry the Argo across the desert. Twelve days later, their ship on their shoulders, they arrive at Lake Triton and the garden of the Hesperides. They receive some astonishing news from the Hesperides: Heracles raided the garden just the day before. He has already vanished into the distance and so they must depart without him yet again. Meanwhile, they lose another two comrades, Mopsus and Canthus, one dying from snake bite, the other from a wound inflicted by a local shepherd belonging to the ancestral family of the native Garamantes and Nasamones. Shortly afterwards, Triton reveals a route from the lake to the open sea and entrusts Euphemus with a magical clod of earth that is destined to become the island of Thera, from which Libya would later be settled by Greek colonists. Triton carries off a tripod, as an offering of thanks. The story ends with a visit to the island of Anaphe, where the Argonauts institute rites in honour of Apollo, and Aegina (not far from Jason's home), where they establish a festival competition, fetching water and racing one another with full amphorae on their shoulders.

== Discussion ==
=== Callimachean epic ===
The Argonautica is modelled on Homer's poetry to a considerable extent. There are, of course, similarities in plots. The return journey in Book 4, for example, has many parallels in the Odyssey – Scylla, Charybdis, the Sirens and Circe are hazards that Odysseus also negotiates. The Argonautica is notable too for the high number of verses and phrases imitating Homer, and for the way it reproduces linguistic peculiarities of old epic, in syntax, metre, vocabulary and grammar. Apollonius in fact is the most Homeric of all the poets whose work has come down to us from the Hellenistic age, when Homeric scholarship flourished and almost all poets responded to Homer's influence, including Callimachus. Homeric echoes in Argonautica are quite deliberate and are not slavish imitation. When Jason first meets Hypsipyle in Book 1, he wears a cloak made for him by Athena, embroidered with various scenes alluding to tragic women that Homer's Odysseus met in Hades (Odyssey 11.225–380). This Homeric echo has ominous connotations, prefiguring Jason's betrayal of Hypsipyle and Medea.

Apollonius often implies that he is updating and therefore improving on Homer. Symbolically this is represented by the abandonment of Heracles and the fixing of the Clashing Rocks – it is as if Jason and his crew are leaving behind the heroic world of traditional myth. Argonautica includes numerous aitia, or mythological accounts of the origins of things (see Itinerary below), and these ensure that the narrative points forward to the world of the third century audience rather than back to Homer. Cultured Alexandrians considered themselves heirs of a long literary tradition, and this is evoked when Apollonius crowds his poem with as much research material as he could borrow from mythical, historiographical and ethnographic sources.

Argonautica was just one of many narrative epics written in the Hellenistic period – and the only one to survive. Apollonius is too much of an individual for us to deduce from his work the nature of the other epics. It is known that Callimachus was an influential critic of contemporary epics but that need not have included Argonautica, which seems to have been responsive to his views. Thus even though modelled on the Homeric epic, it is much shorter, with four books totaling fewer than 6,000 lines (Homer's Iliad for example runs to more than 15,000). Apollonius may have been influenced here by Callimachus's advocacy of brevity. Possibly he was responding too to Aristotle's demand for "poems on a smaller scale than the old epics, and answering in length to the group of tragedies presented at a single sitting", since theatre audiences at the Dionysia typically sat through four plays per day and Argonautica's four books are about the same total length.

The influence of Callimachus is seen in the widespread use of aitia, since these were a notable feature of his work too. More particularly, there are some pointed allusions to his work. For example, one line (1.1309) is a verbatim quotation of Callimachus (Aitia I fr. 12.6 Pf): "And thus were those things to be accomplished in the course of time". (Note: In Greek the imitation is especially notable: καὶ τὰ μὲν ὣσ ἤμελλε μετὰ χρόνον ἐκτελέεσθαι, where ἤμελλε is an un-Homeric word used by Apollonius only here, in contrast to the Homeric ἔμελλε, which he uses ten times – A. Köhnken, Theocritus, Callimachus and Apollonius Rhodius, 77) The epiphany of Apollo in book 2, over the island of Thynia, is followed by an account of the god's deeds and worship (2.686–719) that recalls an account in Callimachus's Hymn to Apollo (97–104), and book 4 ends in a cluster of aitia, including the origins of the island Thera, the naming of Anaphe, and the water-carrying festival on Aegina, that are reminiscent of Aitia I and Iamb. 8. This final cluster of aitia can seem like an arbitrary addition to the narrative, as if Apollonius prolonged the story just to add mere curiosities, but they may have been included as a final "programmatic statement" of support for Callimachean Aitia-style aesthetics, expressing Apollonius's debt to Callimachus as mentor.

The poem's anti-heroic qualities are generally regarded as further evidence of its "Callimacheanism". Jason is not like a traditional epic hero, and the contrast between him and Heracles can be interpreted as a distinction between Homeric and Callimachean poetics. In summary, recent scholarship leads to the conclusion that Argonautica was a successful and fundamental renewal of the Homeric epic, expressed in terms of Callimachean aesthetics: the label Callimachean epic is not misplaced.

=== Epic heroism ===
Jason's character traits are more characteristic of the genre of realism than epic, in that he was, in the words of J. F. Carspecken:

chosen leader because his superior declines the honour, subordinate to his comrades, except once, in every trial of strength, skill or courage, a great warrior only with the help of magical charms, jealous of honour but incapable of asserting it, passive in the face of crisis, timid and confused before trouble, tearful at insult, easily despondent, gracefully treacherous in his dealings with the love-sick Medea ... (Note: Carspecken, "Apollonius Rhodius and the Homeric epic," ''Yale Classical Studies 13 (1952:101) finds the heroism instead in the group, the Argonauts.)

This hostile view can be extended to the whole crew: the Bebrycian episode, where Polydeuces beats the native king to death, and where the Argonauts turn piratical, may be understood as the start of their moral decline, which intensifies and culminates in the murder of Medea's brother. Medea too may forfeit our sympathy, appearing to change from a likeable heroine in Book 3 to a frightful witch engaged in evil in Book 4.

Interpretations of Jason's character however differ from one critic to another. According to a less hostile view, he resembles the ordinary man and his brand of heroism is relevant to the real world, whereas Heracles stands for a primitive and anachronistic kind of heroism, which is why he is abandoned early in the story. On the other hand, epic poets are not supposed to arbitrate moral values, Jason and Heracles each have good and bad qualities and we shouldn't overplay the differences between them. Jason is a democratic-minded hero with a weakness for women, or he is just the chance result of the poet's literary experiments. His lack of heroic stature seems quite appropriate to the melancholy world Apollonius depicts. In this world, people are alienated from each other and from their environment, as symbolized by the Libyan desert, where the Argonauts scatter so as to die privately: "effort no longer has the power to transform, and weakness is as influential as strength."

For many readers, the strangely unheroic quality of the poem is only redeemed by the romance between Jason and Medea in Book 3, and even the history of scholarship on Apollonius has had its focus there. Sensitive descriptions of heterosexual love first emerge in Western literature during the Hellenistic period and Argonautica was innovative in making it an epic topic.

=== Characters without character ===
Medea is generally agreed to be the most interesting and lifelike character in the poem yet even she may be considered unconvincing in some respects. Her role as a romantic heroine seems at odds with her role as a sorceress. These contradictory roles were embedded in the traditional accounts that Apollonius inherited. On the other hand, Apollonius emphasizes the technical aspect of her magical powers, such as her mastery of drugs, a touch of realism that may seem to downplay her role as a sorceress.

Unconvincing characterization may also be explained as a comic effect. Heracles can be seen as something of a buffoon. His homosexual or pederastic relationship with Hylas is covered only obliquely and even then in a humorous way, as if to set the stage for the more serious relationship between the hero and heroine. The entire crew of the Argo acquires comic significance whenever fantastic or "fairy-tale" elements are incorporated into the epic plot, such as the encounters with the Clashing Rocks, the Wandering Rocks, the Argo's voyage overland etc. They appear comic precisely because these fairy-tale elements are in contrast to the Argonauts' unheroic stature, as people like you and me. The gods in particular are characterized by Alexandrian realism. Homer's gods also are more like people than divinities but Apollonius provides them with a liveliness, an orderliness and a degree of banality that evoke domesticity in Alexandrian high society. Much of the poem's irony and charm in fact lies in the conflation of these different worlds.

Characters have symbolic roles to fulfill. Though Heracles is abandoned at the end of Book 1, he continues to haunt the narrative as a background figure, glimpsed in the distance and reported as an active presence, thus symbolizing the way traditional epic offers the poem a literary background. As one scholar recently observed: "This is just the way in which old epic with its generic conventions and its ideology is present in the Argonautica: dimly visible ... but still present." Characters also function as the poet's alter ego. Homer in the Odyssey also uses the device, through the singers Demodocus and Phemius. In Argonautica, the role is performed by the doomed seers Mopsus and Idmon, and especially the singer Orpheus. Whereas the companions of Homer's Odysseus pass the Sirens in safety by stuffing their ears with wax, the Argonauts are saved from the Sirens by the music that Orpheus plays to drown them out. Two types of song are represented here, one from the Homeric world, voiced through the Sirens, and the other from the world of Ptolemaic Alexandria, through the identification Orpheus=Apollonius. The contest symbolizes the updating of epic. Apollonius takes the symbolic role of characters further than Homer. The seers Idmon and Mopsus, able to interpret signs, might also be understood to represent the ideal audience, able to interpret symbols. Other characters however can also fulfill this role, such as Peleus, who successfully interprets Jason's encounter with the Libyan nymphs, thus leading to the Argo being carried across the desert. By this means the audience is encouraged to interpret the poet's own complex meanings – 'heroes' like Peleus are people just like us and their powers of insight are ours too.

=== Episodic epic ===
Some of the episodic quality of Argonautica can be put down to its genre, as a voyage narrative. Homer's Odyssey also features some disunity, as a set of adventures, with surprising discoveries waiting around every headland. Thus Longinus contrasted the Odyssey unfavourably with the Iliad: in the former, he thought the mythical element predominates over the action, whereas he thought the Iliad gains dramatic tension through the development of a single, great contest. Voyage narratives don't fit in well with Aristotelian notions of dramatic unity, or, as one modern scholar recently put it: "It is precisely this inherent inconsequentiality, the episodic partition imposed by the very nature of travel, which can be seen at the heart of the Western tradition of romance, as opposed to the harsh teleologies of epic."

Argonautica however goes beyond Homer's Odyssey in its fragmentation of the action. Apollonius seems to have rejected the Aristotelian concept of unity, since numerous aitia interrupt the story with "flashbacks" to myths predating the Argonaut story, and with "fast-forwards" to customs in the poet's own time. The narrator's choice of material is thus of immediate interest to the reader, since it interrupts the action, unlike the traditional method of Homer, where the poet keeps a low profile. One of Homer's virtues as a narrator, from Aristotle's point of view, was in letting characters do much of the talking. (Note: Homer especially deserves praise as the only epic poet to realize what the epic poet should do in his own person, that is, say as little as possible, since it is not in virtue of speaking in his own person that he is a maker of mimesis – Aristotle, Poetics 1460a5-11) The dominant presence in Argonautica is the poet himself – 71% of the verses are spoken by him, rather than by his characters, whereas only 55% of the Iliad and 33% of the Odyssey are in Homer's own voice.

Some of the episodic quality comes also from the poet's literary eclecticism. For instance, the role of the Argo in the Greek settlement of northern Africa was a common topic of Greek literature. Pindar, a poetic model for Apollonius and Callimachus, composed three odes for the ruling elite of Cyrene, including Pythian 4, where he mentions the clod of earth that Euphemus received from Triton and which became the island Thera, the mother city of Cyrene. The historian Herodotus mentioned the tripod that Triton received, a pledge of Libya's future colonization by descendants of the Argonauts (Herodotus 4.179). Both these accounts found their way into Argonautica.

Paradoxically, this highly episodic poem, fragmented in time and with events unfolding in a changing landscape, can yet be thought to have more unity than any other epic. Its unity comes from its location within the milieu of Ptolemaic Alexandria. Occupying the eastern corner of Libya, Alexandria was founded only about sixty years before Apollonius wrote his epic and it comprised, in addition to native Egyptians, a large share of the Greek diaspora, about half of whom came via the Greek colony of Cyrene.

The Ptolemaic setting makes sense of many of the poet's enigmatic choices. Thus for example the final cluster of aitia is not an arbitrary addition but neatly associates the story's end with the beginning of Greek settlement in Egypt.

The island of Thera was the mother city of Cyrene and symbolized Greek settlement of Libya. Aegina was once home to the Argonauts Peleus and Telamon, exiled thence for murdering their brother, thus symbolizing the Greek diaspora. The island of Anaphe is where the Aitia of Callimachus begins with a tale of the Argonauts, and his final aition is in Alexandria, so that Argonautica's progression from Iolcus to Anaphe becomes part of a cycle: "Taken together these two poems de facto complete the prophecy that begins in a mythic past."

Any apparent weaknesses in characterization can also be explained in the Ptolemaic setting – the story isn't really about Jason or about any of the Argonauts, as individuals, but about their historic role in establishing a Greek destiny in Libya.

Argonautica's original audience of ethnic Greeks would have glimpsed their own migrant history in the motley Greek crew of the Argo, and similarly Hellenized Egyptians would have glimpsed themselves in the Colchian diaspora depicted in Book 4. According to Herodotus, Colchis was colonized by Egyptians (see details in Itinerary). In that case, the Colchian fleets that settle in and around Greece may be thought to prefigure the Greek colonization of Egypt.

Apollonius conflates Greek and Egyptian mythology. Islands symbolized creation in the Egyptian scheme of things, being associated with the ground emerging from the Nile floods. Thera and Anaphe, as emergent islands, are recreations of the myth.

Egyptians considered Libya's western desert to be the land of the dead. The Sun, who traversed the sky in a boat during the day, returned at night in the same boat via the underworld, a cycle associated with cosmic life and death.

The stranding of the Argonauts on the Libyan coast, their carrying of Argo across the desert and the deaths there of Mopsus and Canthus give a Greek perspective to this Egyptian symbolism, with the Golden Fleece figuring as a solar emblem. Thus the action of the Argonautica can seem highly organized, as an attempt to soften the boundaries between Alexandria's indigenous ethnic population and its immigrant Greeks, by means of a shared mythology and worldview.

=== Other issues ===
Though critics have concentrated on Homeric echoes in Argonautica, direct borrowings from tragedy, such as Euripides's Medea, can be found. Argonautica is often placed in a literary tradition that leads to the Ancient Greek novel. (Note: Charles R. Beye, in emphasising the internal life of the protagonist observes, "We have reached, in effect, the beginnings of the novel." (Beye, Epic and Romance in the Argonautica of Apollonius [University of Southern Illinois Press] 1982:24).) Apollonius chooses the less shocking versions of some myths, having Medea, for example, merely watch the murder of Apsyrtus instead of murdering him herself. The gods are relatively distant and inactive throughout much of the epic, following the Hellenistic trend to allegorize and rationalize religion.

==== The poetry ====
For a discussion of poetic style and technique in Argonautica see Apollonius of Rhodes § Poetic style.

== Information charts ==
=== The Argonauts ===
The Argonauts are listed here in the order in which they are catalogued in lines 1–227 of Book 1. (Note: Argonaut list and information adapted from W. Race's Apollonius Rhodius:Argonautica, lines 1.23-227 and index)

Argonauts
Name	Characteristics	Actions	Mentions by name: [book] & line no.
Jason	Father Aeson, mother Alcimede	As indicated by the page numbers, he becomes a more influential hero in the second half of the poem (books 3 and 4). He is often referred to only as 'Son of Aeson'.	[1] 8, 206, 232, 349, 409, 534, 1330; [2] 122, 211, 491, 871, 1158, 1281; [3] 2, 28, 66, 143, 357, 439, 474, 566, 922, 1147, 1194, 1246, 1363; [4] 63, 79, 107, 165, 170, 352, 393, 454, 489, 1083, 1122, 1152, 1331, 1701 "Son of Aeson": [1] 33, 46, 123, 228, 407, 436, 460, 463, 494, 854, 887, 1032, 1084, 1092, 1133, 1288, 1332; [2] 437, 444, 615, 762, 1178, 1271; [3] 58, 60, 86, 169, 194, 282, 288, 318, 385, 475, 491, 509, 542, 574, 752, 913, 941, 961, 973, 1017, 1142, 1163, 1214, 1221, 1262, 1278; [4] 73, 92, 114, 149, 187, 253, 355, 427, 464, 477, 530, 688, 785, 1012, 1087, 1116, 1162, 1313, 1528, 1593, 1664, 1747, 1755
Orpheus	Son of Oeagrus and Calliope, born at Pimpleia in Thessalian Pieria, home of the Muses, he is the ruler of Bistonian (Thracian) Pieria	He encourages the crew with his music and he establishes musical rites for cults they establish along the way, as at Bear Mountain and Thynias Island	[1] 23, 32, 494, 540, 915, 1134; [2] 161, 685, 928; [4] 905, 1159, 1409, 1547
Asterion	Son of Cometes, from Thessalian Peiresia, near the junction of rivers Apidanus and Enipeus		[1] 35
Polyphemus	From Thessalian Larissa, son of Eilatus, he once fought for the Lapiths against the Centaurs and is now "heavy" with age but still warlike.	He is left behind with Heracles at the river Cius (end of Book I), and he is destined to establish a city there (Cius), before dying in the land of the Chalybes.	[1] 40, 1241, 1347; [4] 1470
Iphiclus	Jason's maternal uncle		[1] 45, 121
Admetus	Ruler of Thessalian Pherae		[1] 49
Erytus	Son of Hermes, from Thessalian Alope, skilled in trickery; his mother was Antianeira, the daughter of Menetes		[1] 52
Echion	Brother of Erytus and skilled in trickery		[1] 52
Aethalides	Thessalian half-brother of the above two, father Hermes, mother was Eupolemeia, daughter of Myrmidon.	He acts as a herald thanks to his "imperishable memory', serving for example as a messenger between the Argonauts and the women of Lemnos.	[1] 54, 641; [3] 1175
Coronus	Son of Caeneus, from Thessalian Gyrton, a brave man; his father was buried alive by the Centaurs, who were unable to kill him in battle.		[1] 57
Mopsus	Apollo's son, skilled in the augury of birds, from Thessalian Titaresia.	He is an advisor to Jason. He dies from snake bite in Libya	[1] 65, 80, 1083, 1106; [2] 923; [3] 543, 916, 938; [4] 1502, 1518
Eurydamas	Son of Ctimenus, from Thessalian Ctimene near lake Xynias		[1] 67
Menoetius	From Locrian Opus, son of Actor		[1] 69
Eurytion	Son of Irus, his grandfather is Actor, from Opus		[1] 71
Eribotes	Son of Teleon, from Opus		[1] 71, 73; [2] 1039
Oïleus	Unrivalled for courage, skilled in battle, from Opus	He is wounded by a feather when a bird swoops the Argo off the island of Ares, causing him to drop his oar.	[1] 74; [2] 1037
Canthus	Son of Canethus, his grandfather is Abas, from Euboea	He dies in Libya, killed by a shepherd while trying to steal his sheep (the shepherd, Caphaurus, is a grandson of Apollo).	[1] 77; [4] 1467, 1485, 1497
Clytius	Son of the archer Eurytus, from Thessalian Oechalia	In battle, he kills one of the Doliones and later one of the Bebrycians, then shoots down a bird at Ares Island.	[1] 86, 1044; [2] 117, 1043
Iphitus	Brother of Clytius		[1] 86; [2] 115
Telamon	Son of Aeacus, originally from Aegina, settled on Salamis. Father of Ajax of Salamis, mighty hero in Iliada of Homer.	He angrily accuses Jason of treachery at the end of Book 1 but Glaucus reconciles them, and he nearly threatens the Colchian king but Jason prevents it with a conciliatory speech.	[1] 93, 1043, 1289, 1330; [3] 196, 363, 440, 515, 1174
Peleus	Brother of Telamon, from Phthia, he is father of the infant Achilles	One of Jason's counselors. He rallies the Argonauts with brave advice when Tiphys dies and later when they are daunted by lurid descriptions of Colchis, and he receives instructions from the goddess Hera via his wife Thetis.	[1] 94, 558, 1042; [2] 829, 868, 1217; [3] 504; [4] 494, 816, 853, 880, 1368
Butes	An Athenian, son of Teleon	He is left behind when lured from the ship by the Sirens. Aphrodite saves him and settles him in Sicily.	[1] 95; [4] 914
Phalerus	Another Athenian, his father is Alcoon, who sent him on the voyage though he had no other sons to care for him in old age		[1] 96
Tiphys	Son of Hagnias, from Thespian Siphae (Boeotia), navigator skilled in reading the sea, weather and stars, sent on the voyage by Athena	His skill, with Athena's assistance, gets the Argo through the clashing rocks. He dies of illness soon afterwards and he is buried beside Idmon.	[1] 105, 381, 401, 522, 561, 956, 1274, 1296; [2] 175, 557, 574, 584, 610, 622, 854
Phlias	Son of Dionysus from Araethyraea, near the springs of Boeotian Asopus		[1] 115
Talaus	Son of Bias and Pero, from Argos		[1] 118; [2] 63, 111
Areius	Brother of Talaus		[1] 118
Leodocus	Half-brother of the previous two, by their mother, Pero		[1] 119
Heracles	Son of Zeus and Alcmene	Separated from the other Argonauts at the end of Book I, even before they reach Colchis. This is by the will of the gods, so he can complete the Twelve Labours that will secure his immortality (1.1315–20)	[1] 122, 197, 341, 349, 397, 426, 631, 855, 864, 993, 997, 1040, 1163, 1242, 1253, 1291, 1303, 1316; [2] 146, 767, 772, 793, 913, 957, 967, 1052; [3] 1233; [4] 538, 1400, 1459, 1469, 1477
Hylas	Squire to Heracles.	Abducted by a water nymph to be her husband, causing Heracles to separate from the voyage.	[1] 131, 1207, 1258, 1324, 1350, 1354
Nauplius	Son of Clytonaeus from Argos, descended from another Nauplius who was sired by Poseidon upon Danaus's daughter Amymone		[1] 134; [2] 896
Idmon	Son of Apollo, fostered by Abas in Argos, skilled in omens from birds and burnt offerings; joined the voyage though he knew it would be his death	He is killed by a wild boar at a mouth of the Acheron	[1] 139, 436, 449, 475; [2] 816, 850
Polydeuces	Son of Zeus and Leda, fostered by Tyndareus, from Sparta. Brother of Helen of Sparta and Clytemnestra (wife of Agamemnon of Mycenaes).	In battle, he kills one of the Doliones, and the bullying king of the Bebrycians in a boxing match, which wins the Argonauts friends among neighbouring people	[1] 146; [2] 20, 100, 756; [4] 588
Castor	Half-brother of Polydeuces, son of Leda and Tyndareus, brother of Helen of Sparta and Clytemnestra, wife of Agamemnon of Mycenaes.	In battle, he kills one of the Doliones and a Bebrycian	[1] 147; [2] 62; [4] 589; He and Polydeukes are often mentioned as Tyndaridae: [1] 148, 1045; [2] 30, 41, 74, 798, 806; [3] 517, 1315; [4] 592
Lynceus	Son of Aphareus, from Arene, he has miraculous powers of eyesight	He observes Heracles in the distance in the Libyan desert – too far away to be reached.	[1] 151, 153; [4] 1466, 1478
Idas	Brother of Lynceus	A critic of Jason even before they leave Iolcus. In battle, he kills one of the Doliones and he slays the wild boar that killed Idmon.	[1] 151, 462, 470, 485, 1044; [2] 830; [3] 516, 556, 1170, 1252
Periclymenus	Son of Neleus from Pylos; he could assume any form he chose when in battle		[1] 156
Amphidamas	Son of Aleus, from Arcadian Tegea	He comes up with the strategy that defeats the birds at Ares Island	[1] 161; [2] 1046
Cepheus	King of Tegea and brother of Amphidamas		[1] 161
Ancaeus	Nephew of the previous two, sent on the voyage by his father Lycurgus, who stayed behind to look after the aged Aleus	The Argonauts choose him to row alongside Heracles in the middle of the ship	[1] 164, 398, 426, 429, 531; [2] 118
Augeas	From Elis, a son of Helius	The Colchian king is his half-brother via the sun god, so Jason uses him there as an Argonaut ambassador	[1] 172; [3] 197, 363, 440
Asterius	Son of Hyperasius, from Achaean Pellene		[1] 176
Amphion	Brother of Asterius		[1] 176
Euphemus	From Taenarus, sired by Poseidon on Europa; he is the fastest of all runners	He manages the dove that signals to the Argonauts to charge the Clashing Rocks, and he urges them onwards with rallying calls. He accepts a clod of earth from Triton that is destined to become the island of Calliste (Thera), whence Libya would be settled by his descendants.	[1] 179; [2] 536, 556, 562, 588, 896; [4] 1466, 1483, 1563, 1732, 1756, 1758, 1764
Erginus	Son of Poseidon from Miletus		[1] 187; [2] 896
Ancaeus 2	Son of Poseidon from Parthenia (Samos)	He becomes the pilot when Tiphys dies.	[1] 188; [2] 865, 898, 1276; [4] 210, 1260
Meleager	Son of Oeneus, from Calydon (Aetolia);		[1] 191; sometimes called Oeneides: [1] 190, 192, 193 1046; [3] 518
Laocoon	Half-brother of Oeneus, mother a servant girl; sent by Oeneus as mentor to Meleager		[1] 191, 192
Iphiclus 2	Maternal uncle of Meleager, son of Thestius, expert in warfare		[1] 201
Palaimonius	Son of Hephaestus and foster son of Lernus, crippled in both feet like his father but strong and dauntless		[1] 202
Iphitus 2	Son of Naubolus, from Phocis; he once hosted Jason when he went to Pytho to ask the oracle about the voyage		[1] 207
Zetes	Son of the wind god Boreas by Oreithyia, from Thrace; he has wings at his ankles and temples	He chases away the harpies	[1] 211; [2] 243, 282, 430
Calais	Brother of Zetes, winged likewise	He chases away the harpies	[1] 211; [2] 282
Acastus	Son of the wicked Thessalian king Pelias, Jason's taskmaster	He kills one of the Doliones	[1] 224, 321, 1041, 1082
Argus	Son of Arestor, he is Athena's helper in building the Argo; he is mentioned at the start of the crew list (19), in the middle (111) and at the end (226)	He carves an image of the mother goddess for her cult at Cyzicus/Bear Mountain. Not mentioned in the second half of the poem, where 'Argus' signifies the eldest son of Phrixus (below)	[1] 19, 111, 226, 321, 325, 367, 912, 1119; [2] 613, 1188

The Argonauts are joined by others during the voyage:

- Dascylus, son of the Mariandylian king Lycus (he leaves the ship again at Sinope on the return journey from Colchis).
- Argus, Cytissorus, Phrontis and Mela: the four sons of Phrixus, grandsons of the Colchian king.
- Deileon, Autolycus and Phlogius: three sons of the Thessalian, Deimachus, and formerly comrades of Hercules stranded at Sinope ever since their campaign against the Amazons.
- Medea
- Twelve female attendants for Medea, a gift from Arete, queen of Phaeacian Drepane

=== Itinerary ===
Here follows a list of places where the narrative states or implies that Argo came to shore. Time is here seen from the perspective of the poet – the time at which Apollonius wrote is governed by the present tense and by qualifiers like "now" and "to this day", the mythical action of the poem is governed by the past tense, whereas our own time is denoted 'modern'.

Itinerary
Places	Comments	Aitia and foundation myths
Iolcus	Home of Jason, its harbour Pagasae was starting point for the voyage.	
Magnesia	Their first landfall, near the "tomb of Dolops" (a son of Hermes). They were kept there by adverse winds for two days.	The beach is named "Argo's Aphetae" (Argo's Launching), commemorating their departure on the third day (1.592)
Lemnos	Their next landfall after two days without stop.	The Lemian women once murdered all males on the island, except their king Thoas, who was cast adrift in a wooden chest. He came ashore at an island named after the nymph Oenoe but now (and also in modern times) it is called Sicinus after the son she bore Thoas (1.620-26)
Samothrace (Island of Electra)	They arrived the same day they left Lemnos, on the advice of Orpheus, since there were secret rites here that could protect sailors.	Apollonius piously refuses to describe the sacred rites of the Cabiri (1.919–21).
Cyzicus Peninsula (Bear Mountain)	Next port of call after passing through the Hellespont at night. Apollonius refers to the Hellespont as "Athamas's daughter" (1.927), an allusion to its well-known mythical association with Helle and the Golden Fleece.	Jason's long stay at Cyzicus accounts for multiple aetia. One of the Argo's anchor stones is at a temple of 'Athena, Jason's Helper' (1.955-60), and a shoreline stone that the ship was once tied to is now known as 'Sacred Rock' (1.1018–20) A path up the local mountain Dindymum is named 'Jason's Way' because he once passed that way (1.988). The local Doliones still commemorate their countrymen who died in the accidental fight with the Argonauts (1.1047–48) and the tomb of their slain king is still visible (1.1061–62). His bride's suicide caused the wood nymphs to shed tears that became the eponymous spring 'Cleite' (1.1065–69) and the locals still commemorate those sad events by grinding their grain at the public mill every anniversary, as if they are too grief-stricken to grind it themselves (1.1075–77). The cult of the Mother Goddess (Rhea/Cybele) was established there by Jason and thus a spring that miraculously appeared at that time is called 'Jason's Spring' (1.1146–48). A musical rite was initiated by Orpheus and it is still associated with the cult(1.1134–39).
Cius River	They arrived the same day they left Bear Mountain. Heracles took child-hostages so that their relatives would help him search for Hylas and he later settled them at Trachis.	Polyphemus founded a city now named after the river (1.1345–47). The inhabitants of Cius to this day "ask after Hylas" and they still maintain close relations with Trachis (1.1354–57).
Gulf of Olbia	Their next stop brought them to the land of the Bebrycians, where Polydeuces killed the king in a boxing match	
Thynian coast	They arrived after a wave almost wiped them out near the Bosphorus. They rescued Phineus from the harpies and they were then detained here for some days by the Etesian winds.	The sons of Boreas overtook the harpies far to the west at the Floating Islands but Iris turned them back, not permitting the harpies to be killed. Thus the islands are now called the Turning Islands (Greek: Στροφάδες, romanized: Strofades). In a digression, the poet also explains the origin of the Etesian winds, associated with the myth of Aristaeus and some sacrificial rites still practised on the island of Ceos
Thynias	Their landfall after passing the Clashing Rocks. They saw Apollo passing northwards to visit the Hyperboreans and they honoured him with a paean. (Note: The refrain of the paean is "Hail to the Healing God, hail to the Healing God Phoebus", for which see Homeric Hymn to Apollo 517 – cited by W.H. Race, Apollonius Rhodius: Argonautica, 168) They then swore to help each other ever after.	The Clashing Rocks stopped moving once the Argonauts passed through and they are still fixed in their place. The island Thynias is now called "The Sacred Island of Apollo Heoïus" (Apollo of the Dawn) and a shrine of Concord can be found there to this very day. In a digression, the poet tells us how the paean sung here originated with the Corycian nymphs.
Acherusian headland	Argo moored in the harbour here after a day and night sailing from Thynias. Here Idmon was subsequently killed by a wild boar and Tiphys perished by illness.	The king of the native Mariandynians, Lycus, received the Argonauts hospitably, happy in the death of the Bebrycian king at the hands of Polydeukes, and he said he would build a shrine on top of the headland, visible to sailors far away, in honour of Polydeukes and his brother. The tombs of Idmon and Tiphys are visible today. Later settlers from Boetia and Megara were instructed by Apollo to honour Idmon as their city guardian but today instead they honour Agamestor (Note: Boeotians and Megarians founded the city Heraclea (Pontica) in the sixth century. Agamestor was a local hero – see for example Pausanias 5.26.7)
Tomb of Sthenelus	The Argonauts come ashore here when Sthenelus (son of Actor) appeared to them on his tomb.	They offered him libations and set up an altar to Apollo the Ship Preserver. Orpheus dedicated his lyre to the god and the place is now called Lyra.
Sinope	Here they meet three companions of Heracles stranded after his expedition against the Amazons	In a digression, the poet tells the story of Sinope, the nymph settled here by Zeus.
Thermodon River	The harbour of the Amazons. Argonauts depart before the women can assemble for battle	
Ares Island	Island sacred to Amazons, infested with hostile birds	Approaching the island, they pass the Mossynoeci, and the poet tells us in a digression that these people are named after their wooden towers ("mossynes")
Colchis	Scene of the entire Book 3	In a digression, the poet links the field of Ares in Colchis with the foundation of Thebes by Cadmus: Athena shared the dragon's teeth between Cadmus and Aeetes. The main city, Aea, is said to be one of many cities that were founded in Europe and Asia by Egyptian forces. Modern scholars connect this account with one by Herodotus (Histories 2.102–106)), identifying the Egyptian leader as the legendary king Sesostris. (Note: W. H. Race, Apollonius Rhodius: Argonautica, 351, note 31)
Halys River	The Argonauts arrived here on the third morning after fleeing Colchis.	They built a sanctuary to Hecate, still visible, where Medea practised sacrificial rites that the poet dares not reveal.
Narex	The northern end of a "three-cornered island" (Danube Delta), which allowed the Argonauts to sail up the Ister or Danube behind their pursuers, who had entered at the southern end.	
Brygean Islands (Note: The 'Brygean Islands' are located in the Kvarner Gulf by W. H. Race, Apollonius Rhodius: Argonautica, maps section)	The Argonauts and Colchians reached the Adriatic Sea by a fabled branch of the Ister River.	Jason and Medea murdered her brother Apsyrtus on one of the Brygean Islands. His Colchian followers later settled around the Adriatic and their descendants still remain there, including the 'Apsyrtians' on the Brygean Islands. Other Colchians settled in Illyria (near the tombs of Cadmus and Harmonia, modern day Pola) and the Ceraunian Mountains.
Electris Island	An island near the mouth of the Eridanus. Its exact location is unknown to modern scholars. Herodotus (3.115) and Strabo (5.1.9) considered it imaginary. The Argonauts hid out here while the leaderless Colchian fleet disbanded, following the death of Apsyrtus.	
Hyllus	A city on the Dalmatian coast. Its exact location is unknown to modern scholars but somewhere near modern Šibenik. It is home of the Hylleans, who proved friendly to the Argonauts after the death of Apsyrtus.	In gratitude for their kindness, Jason endowed the Hylleans with a tripod, originally a gift to him from Apollo, which protects their country against invaders to this very day. They buried it for safe-keeping deep under the city of Hyllus, where it still lies hidden. The city, country and people took their name from Hyllus, a son of Heracles and the water nymph Melite.
Eridanus	A fabulous river, often identified with the Po. The Argo was driven back north into this river by a storm. The storm was sent by Hera to forestall a worse fate planned by Zeus as punishment for the murder of Apsyrtus. Apollonius assumes that the Eridanus joins with the Rhine and Rhone, allowing the Argo to enter either the Ligurian Sea or North Sea.	The "innermost stream" (μύχατον ῥόον) of this river spews noxious steam, where Phaethon once crashed to earth. The Heliades, his sisters, mourn for him in the form of poplar trees, their tears the amber drops that are found in the river. However, Apollonius also mentions a local Celtic legend, according to which these are tears that Apollo shed for his dead son Asclepius.
Hyeres Islands ('Stoechades' or 'Ligystian' Islands) (Note: For the identification of Hyeres Islands, see W. H. Race, Apollonius Rhodius: Argonautica, note 71, page 373)	After entering the Ligurian Sea via the Rhone, the Argo arrived safely at these islands thanks mainly to the prayers of Castor and Pollux.	Altars and rites in honour of Castor and Pollux were established here forever, as they were not only guardians of this voyage but continue protectors of sailors to this day.
Elba ('Aethalia')	Argo's next stop after the Stoechades. Here the Argonauts wiped their sweaty hands on pebbles on a beach and they played discus with large stones.	The pebbles are flesh-coloured today, the discus stones are still visible, as are other signs of the visit. The place where they rested is now named Argo Harbour.
Aeaea (Mount Circeo?)	The island home of Circe, whose magic released Jason and Medea from the consequences of her brother's murder.	The island was populated by biological monstrosities, each sporting a strange assortment of limbs. Such creatures were common in the early history of the earth, before the physical elements had attained their present level of organization (Apollonius's 'science' owes much to pre-Socratic philosophers such as Anaximander and Empedocles)
Eryx	A domain of Aphrodite. The Athenian Argonaut Butes fell overboard in a rapture while the Argo was sailing past the island home of the Sirens, Anthemoessa. Aphrodite rescued him and carried him to Eryx, settling him on Cape Lilybaeum (not far from Drepana or modern Trapani). The other Argonauts sailed on without him, facing even greater perils ahead: Scylla, Charybdis and the Wandering Rocks.	Apollonius doesn't state the aition underlying his account: there is a sanctuary of Aphrodite and Butes at the western tip of Sicily.
Corfu ('Drepane')	The Argonauts were trapped on this island, off the west coast of Greece, by the second Colchian fleet. The Colchians demanded that Medea be surrendered to them but Alcinous, the virtuous king of the native Phaeacians, refused to comply once he learned that she and Jason were husband and wife. They were married on the island in a cave that was once a refuge to Macris, the nurse of Dionysus.	The island is named Drepane (Δρεπάνη), the word for 'sickle', because it rests on the sickle that Cronus used to castrate his father Uranus, from whose blood the Phaeacians sprang. Apollonius also offers an alternative account: the island rests on a scythe (ἅρπη) belonging to Demeter, who taught the Titans how to reap grain, which she did as a memorial to Macris. The cave where Jason and Medea were married is now called Medea's Cave. Altars that Medea set up in a local temple of Apollo still receive annual sacrifices to the nymphs who attended her wedding, and to the Fates (associated with births and marriages). As with the first Colchian fleet, the second dispersed rather than return home empty-handed. They lived for a long time on the island among the Phaeacians, later migrating to the Ceraunian Mountains and Oricum.
Libya	The Argo was beached in the notorious shallows of the Syrtis (Gulf of Sidra) after a north wind swept them from Greek waters. The Argonauts here resigned themselves to death until three nymphs, the guardians of Libya, appeared, advising them to carry the Argo overland. Arriving thus at 'Lake Triton', they encountered the Hesperides, whose garden had been ravaged by Heracles just the day before. Canthus, one of the Argonauts, is subsequently killed by the son of Garamas, a native shepherd and son of Apollo. Another Argonaut, Mopsus, dies from snake bite. A third, Euphemus, receives directions and a clod of earth from Triton.	The Garamantes, a Libyan pastoral tribe, are descended from Garamas (though this is not explicitly stated by Apollonius). The snake that killed Mopsus was descended from the blood of the Gorgon's head that dripped onto the soil when Perseus once flew past. The clod of earth, once dropped into the sea, would become the island Calliste (Thera), from where Greek migrants would one day colonize Libya. The harbour in Lake Triton, where Argo rested before entering the sea, is called Argo Harbour and signs of the visit are still visible there to this day.
Crete	Next stop after Libya was the rugged island of Carpathus, from which it was a short trip to Dicte in Crete (not the mountain of that name, but a haven probably in the north eastern corner of the island). The bronze giant Talos attempted to stop them landing by throwing boulders from a cliff, until Medea put the evil eye on him, causing him to gash open his ankle, whereby he bled to death.	The Argonauts built a shrine here to 'Minoan Athena'.
Anafi (Anaphe)	Leaving Crete, the Argonauts were soon trapped in a starless night, a terror to sailors, called the shroud. Jason prayed for help and then Apollo, brandishing his brilliant bow (in the manner of a modern lighthouse), revealed a tiny island, where they took refuge. The island was too rocky and bare to offer victims for a sacrifice of thanksgiving so the Argonauts libated by pouring water on naked flames, which made the Phaeacian women laugh	The island was named Anaphe ever after ("because Phoebus made it appear to them": Ἀνάφη is here derived from the aorist for make appear). To this day, women on Anaphe taunt their menfolk whenever offerings are made to Apollo
Aegina	Arriving here from Anaphe, the Argonauts began fetching water to their ship. Hurrying to make the most of a good sailing breeze, they made the task into a friendly race.	To this day, there is a race on the island, in which men carry full amphorae on their shoulders. The narrative ends here, within a day's voyage of Iolcus

== Editions and commentaries ==
=== Greek text and English translation ===
- Robert Cooper Seaton. Apollonius Rhodius: Argonautica. London: William Heinemann, 1912 (Loeb Classical Library 1)
- William H. Race. Apollonius Rhodius: Argonautica. Cambridge, Mass.: Harvard University Press, 2008 (Loeb Classical Library 1N)

=== Greek text, (translation) and commentary ===
- George W. Mooney. The Argonautica of Apollonius Rhodius. Edited with introduction and commentary. London and Dublin, 1912
- Marshall Gillies. The Argonautica of Apollonius Rhodius. Book III. Edited with introduction and commentary. Cambridge: University Press, 1928 (reprinted New York: Arno Press, 1979)
- Anthos Ardizzoni. Apollonio Rhodio: Le Argonautiche. Libro I. Testo, traduzione e commentario. Edizioni dell'Ateneo, 1967
- Enrico Livrea. Apollonii Rhodii Argonauticon liber quartus. Introduzione, testo critico, traduzione e commento. Firenze: La nuova Italia, 1973
- Francis Vian. Apollonios de Rhodes. Argonautiques. Texte établie et commenté. Paris: Les belles lettres (Collection Budé)
  - Chants I–II. Traduit par Émile Delage. 1974 (Collection Budé 233)
  - Chant III. Traduit par Émile Delage. 1980 (Collection Budé 273)
  - Chant IV. Traduit par Émile Delage et Francis Vian. 1981 (Collection Budé 279)
- Neil Hopkinson. The Argo sets sail (1.536–58); Heracles breaks his oar (1.1153–71); Medea's dilemma (3.744–824); Talos (4.1629–88) / A Hellenistic Anthology. Cambridge: University Press, 1988; second edition, revised and augmented, 2020 (Cambridge Greek and Latin Classics)
- Richard L. Hunter. Apollonius of Rhodes: Argonautica. Cambridge: University Press (Cambridge Greek and Latin Classics)
  - Book III. 1989
  - Book IV. 2015

=== Commentary only ===
- Rocchina Matteo. Apollonio Rhodio: Argonautiche. Libro II. Introduzione e commento. Pensa Multimedia, 2007
- Malcolm Campbell. A Commentary on Apollonius Rhodius, Argonautica III 1–471. Leiden: Brill, 1994 (Mnemosyne Supplement 141)

=== Edition of Scholia ===
- Carl Wendel. Scholia in Apollonium Rhodium vetera. Berlin: Weidmann, 1935 (repr. 1958 and 1974)

== English translations ==
=== Verse ===
- Edward Burnaby Greene, The Argonautic Expedition (1780)
- Francis Fawkes, The Argonautics of Apollonius Rhodius (1780)
- William Preston, The Argonautics of Apollonius Rhodius (1803)
- Arthur S. Way, The Tale of the Argonauts (1901)
- John Gardner, Jason and Medeia (1973) [Not a translation but a retelling in verse]
- Peter Green, The Argonautika by Apollonios Rhodios (1997; expanded in 2008)
- William H. Race, Argonautika (2008; Loeb Classical Library 1N)
- Rodney Merrill, The Argonautika (2012)
- Aaron Poochigian, Jason and the Argonauts (2014)

=== Prose ===
- Edward Philip Coleridge, The Argonautica of Apollonius Rhodius (1889)
- R. C. Seaton, The Argonautica (1912; Loeb Classical Library 1)
- E. V. Rieu, The Voyage of Argo (1959) Penguin Classics Edition
- Richard Hunter, Apollonius of Rhodes: Jason and the Golden Fleece (1992)
