= Salpion =

Salpion of Athens (Ancient Greek: Σαλπίων) was an ancient Greek sculptor of the Neo-Attic style, known from an inscription bearing his name (ΣΑΛΠΙΩΝ ΑΘΗΝΑΙΟΣ ΕΠΟΙΗΣΕ; "the Athenian Salpion made this") on a large Parian marble Krater, known as "The Gaeta Vase" or "Salpion's Vase" (first century BCE).

== The Gaeta Vase ==
The vessel is finely carved in high relief with a scene showing Hermes entrusting the infant Dionysus to the Nymphs of Nysa for upbringing, accompanied by dancing Satyrs and Maenads.

The krater was likely excavated in the medieval period from the site of an unidentified Roman villa near Formia. The vase was discovered at Gaeta and had been used by sailors as a mooring post, as evidenced by the rope marks left on it. It was initially installed as a baptismal font in the Gaeta Cathedral in the early 17th century. It was removed probably by Ferdinand IV of Naples by 1805, and eventually placed in the Real Museo Borbonico, now the Museo Archeologico Nazionale di Napoli, where it is currently housed.

== Gallery ==
The Gaeta Vase

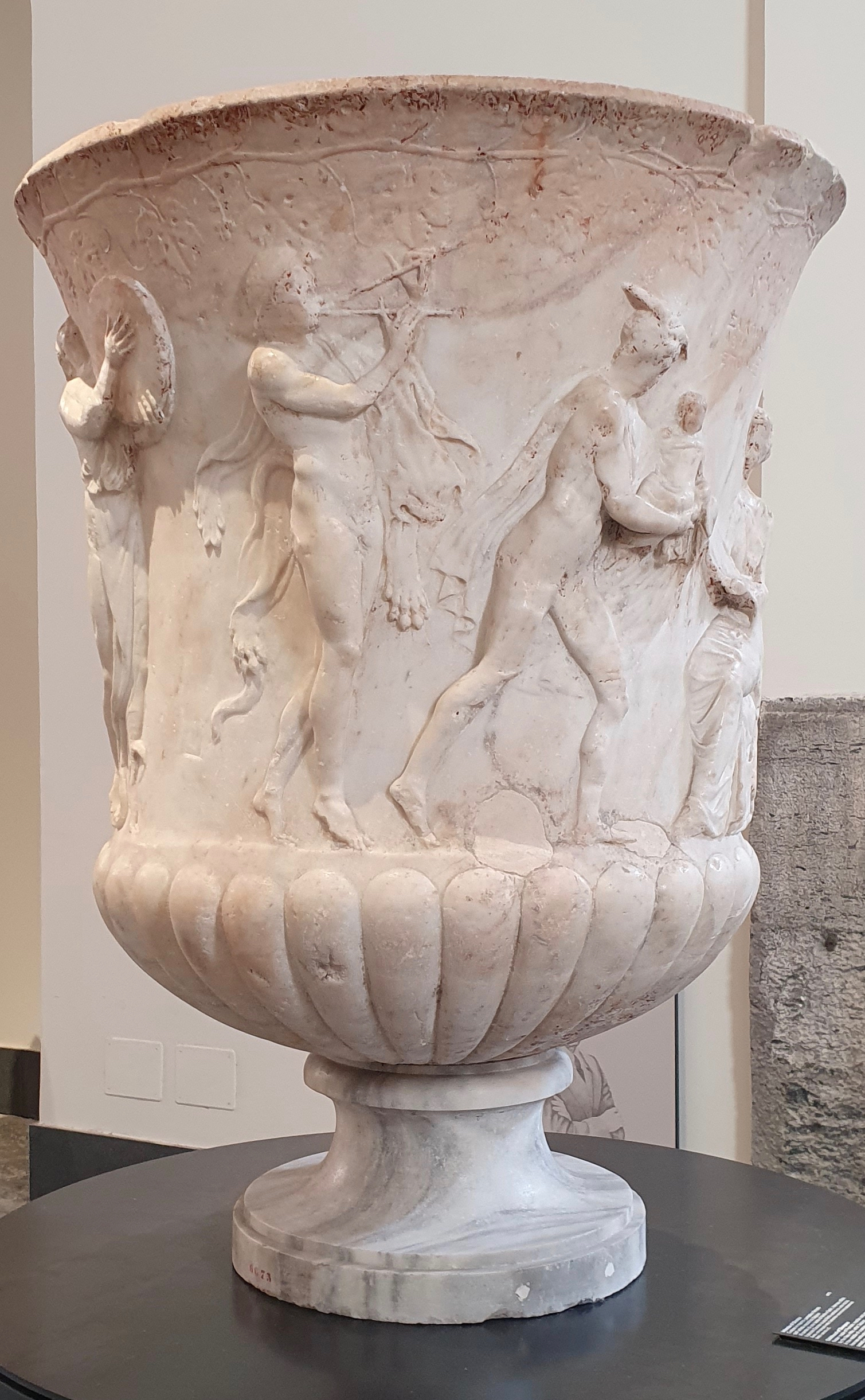

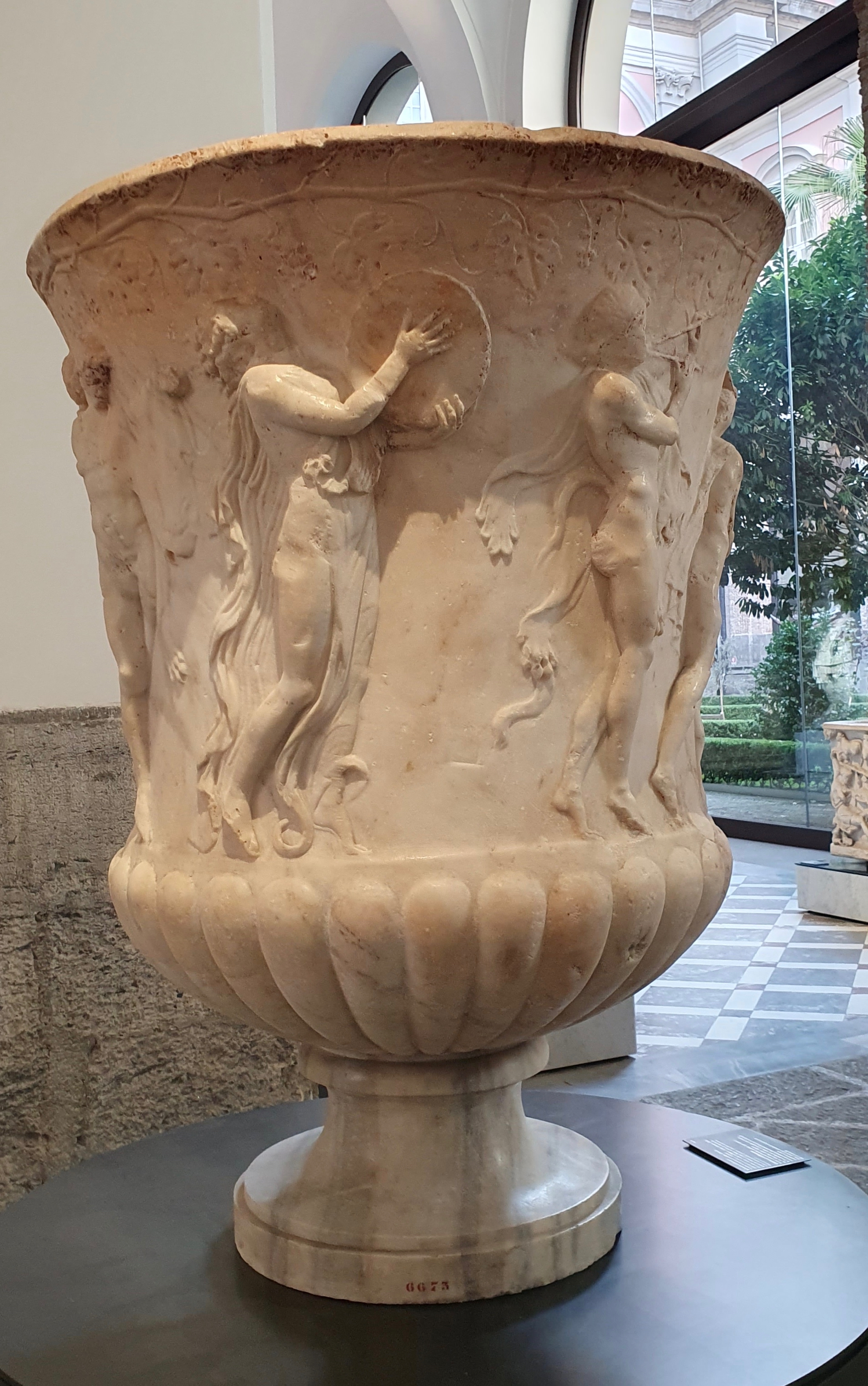

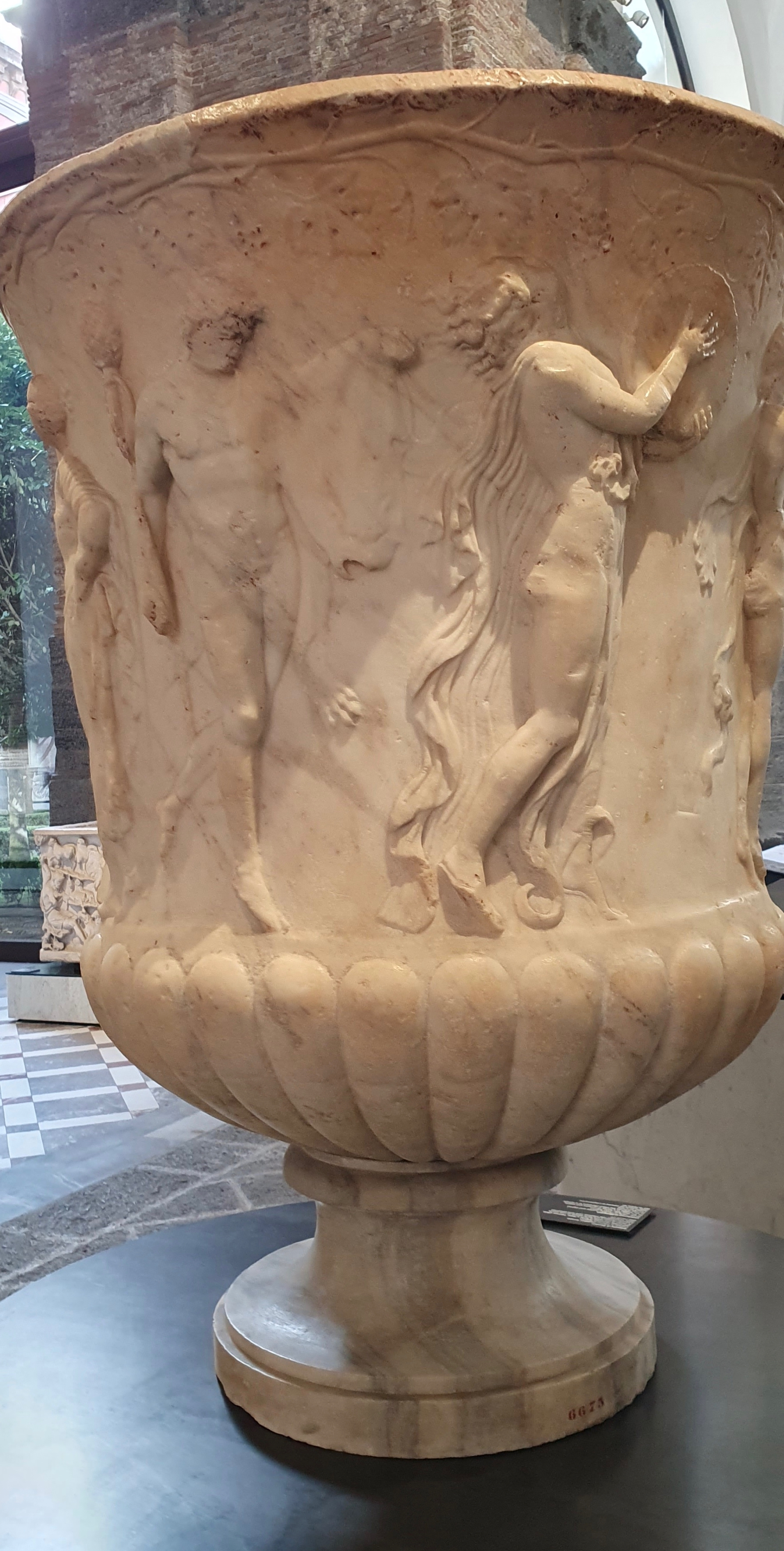

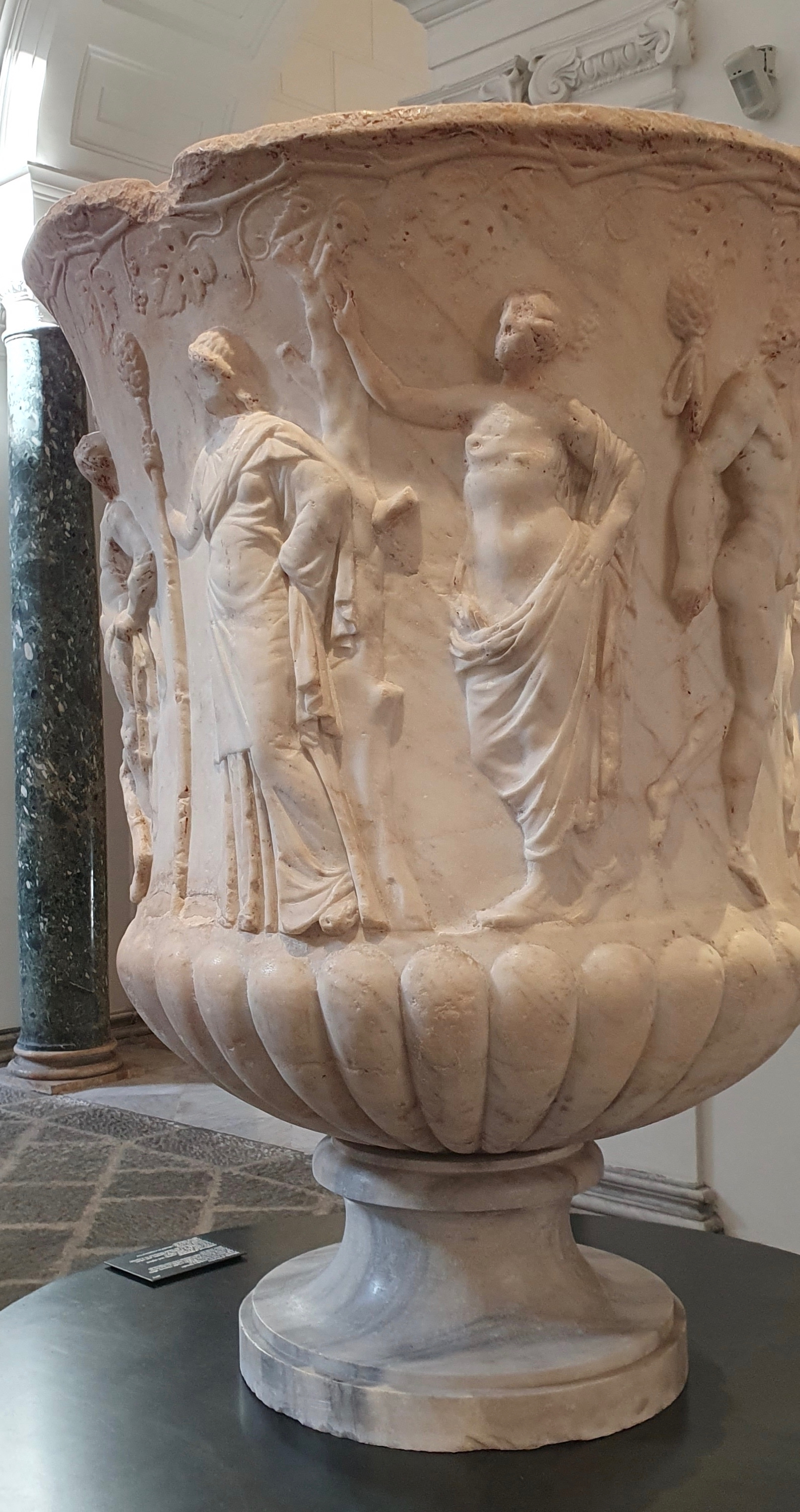

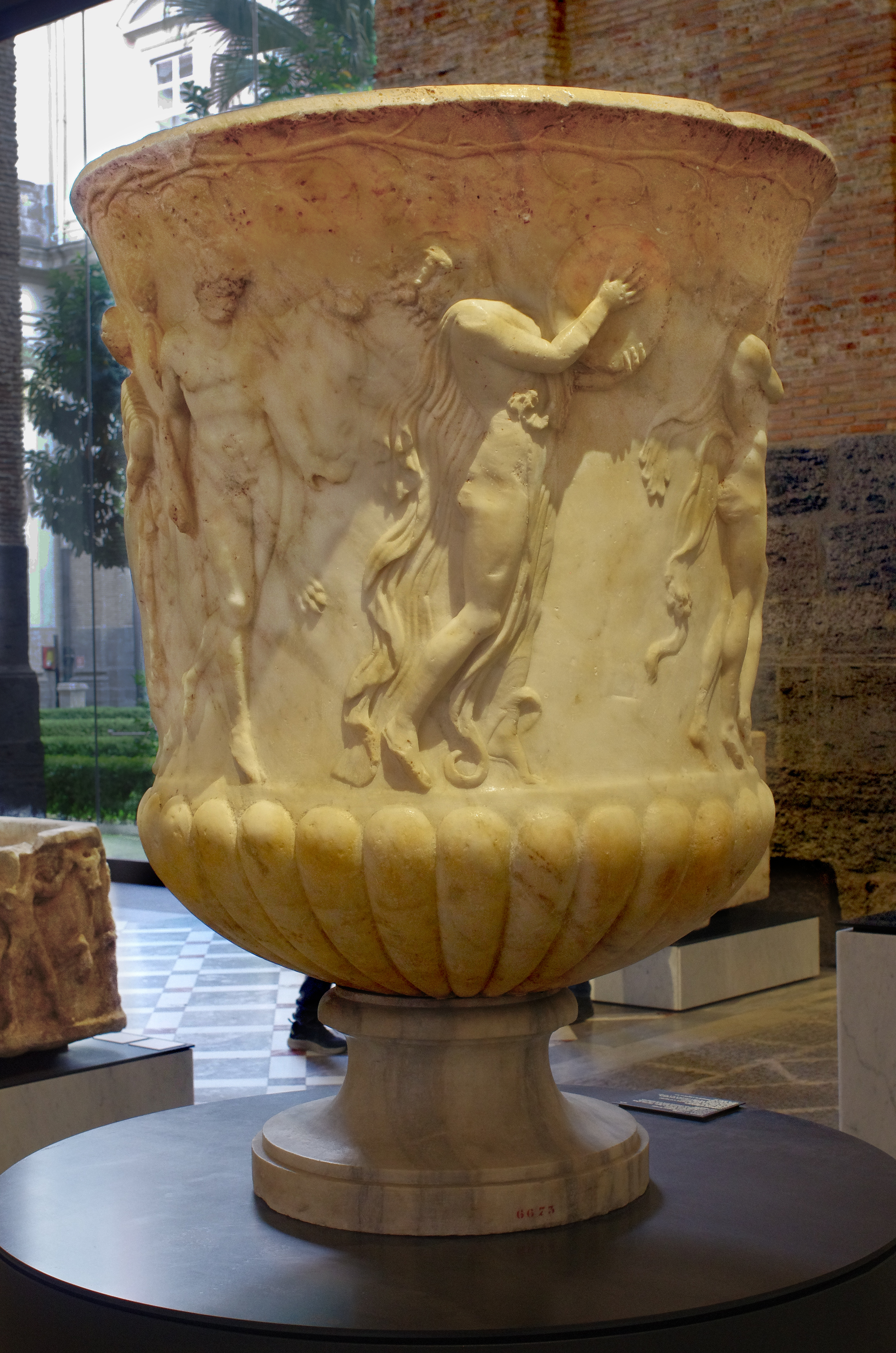
