= Nysa (mythology) =

Area mentioned in Greek mythology

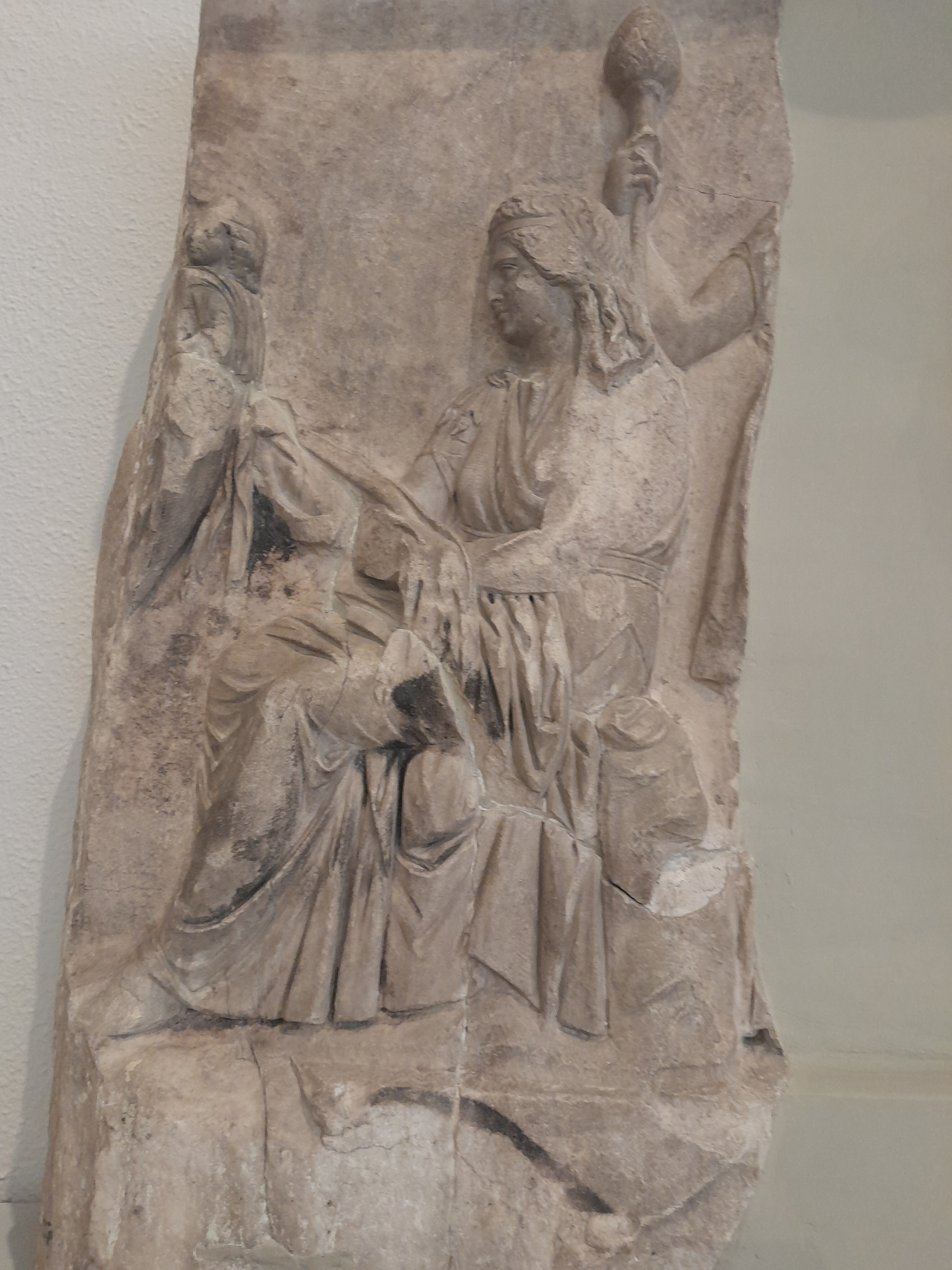
Hermes delivers Dionysus to the nymph Nysa, 400s BC, Archaeological Museum of Piraeus.

In Greek mythology, the mountainous district of Nysa (Ancient Greek: Νῦσα, romanized: Nûsa), variously associated with Ethiopia, Libya, Boeotia, Thrace, India, or Arabia by Greek mythographers, was the traditional place where the rain nymphs, the Hyades, raised the infant god Dionysus, the "God of Nysa." Nysa is also the name of Macris, one the daughters of Aristaeus.

== Mythology ==
Though the worship of Dionysus is sometimes presumed to have arrived in Mycenaean Greece from Asia Minor (where the Hittites called themselves "Nesi" (Note: Due to phonological difficulty in transforming a front vowel /e/ to a back vowel /u/ not seen as the origin of Νῦσα.)), the various locations assigned to Nysa may simply be conventions to show that a romantically remote and mythical land was envisaged. The name Nysa may even be an invention to explain the god's name. Even Homer mentions the mountain Nyseion as the place where Dionysus grew up under the protection of the nymphs. Hesychius of Alexandria (5th century Byzantine lexicon) gives a list of the following locations proposed by ancient authors as the site of Mount Nysa: Arabia, Ethiopia, Egypt, Babylon, Erythraian Sea (the Red Sea), Thrace, Thessaly, Cilicia, India, Libya, Lydia, Macedonia, Naxos, around Pangaios (mythical island south of Arabia), Syria. On his return from Nysa to join his fellow Olympians, Dionysus brought the entheogen wine.

According to Sir William Jones, "Meros is said by the Greeks to have been a mountain in India, on which their Dionysos was born, and that Meru, though it generally means the north pole in Indian geography, is also a mountain near the city of Naishada or Nysa, called by the Greek geographers Dionysopolis, and universally celebrated in the Sanskrit poems."

== People of Nysa ==
- When Alexander the Great arrived at the city of Nysa, representatives of the city met and told him not to capture the city and the land because the god Dionysus had founded the city, and he named it Nysa, after the nymph.
- During the Hellenistic period, "Nysa" was personified as Dionysus' nursemaid (Macris), and she was said to be buried at the town of Scythopolis, which claimed Dionysus as its founder.
- Dionysus has been coined the "masked god," "wine god," and "god of theater" due to his androgynous appearance and ability to hide his true self under facades and enthusiasm. Many Greek stories believe Dionysus to be the son of Zeus, separated and placed in the care of Nysa nymphs in an attempt to protect him from Hera's anger towards Zeus. The nymphs raised him on Nysa until he left for Greece to collect a cult of misfits and those looking for an escape from societal expectations.
- Lycurgus wished to persecute Dionysus for spreading his cult on Mount Nysa, forcing Dionysus and his followers to jump into the sea and shelter with Thetis. Lycurgus's actions inspired Dionysus and the Nysa nymphs to curse him to madness, which resulted in him murdering his son.
