= Yum Burnu =

Turkish Cape at the Bosphorus

Yum Burnu (Turkish 'Cape of Good Hope'), the ancient Ancyræan Cape or Ancyræan Promontory and the modern Greek Cape Psomion, is the cape at the northeast end of the Bosphorus, where it enters the Black Sea.

It is a bold headland descending almost perpendicularly into the water.

Just below it is a reef which is often identified as the Asian side of the mythical Symplegades.
