= Symplegades =

Pair of rocks in Greek mythology

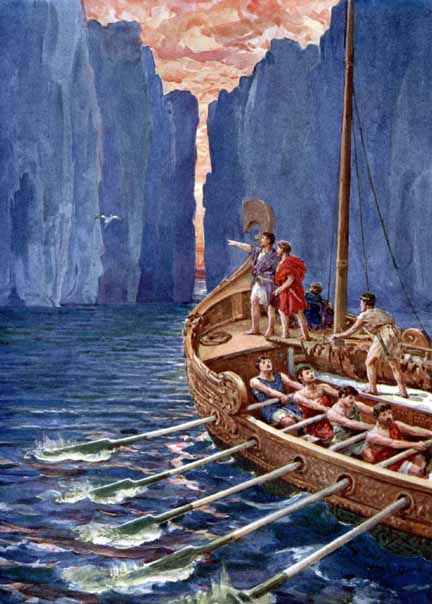
Illustration by Howard Davie for The Heroes by Charles Kingsley.

The Symplegades (/sɪmˈplɛɡədiːz/; Greek: Συμπληγάδες, Symplēgádes), also known as Clashing Rocks or Cyanean Rocks (Κυανέαι), were, according to Greek mythology, a pair of rocks at the Bosphorus that clashed together whenever a vessel went through. They were defeated by Jason and the Argonauts, who would have been lost and killed by the rocks except for Phineus's advice. Jason let a dove fly between the rocks to see exactly how fast they would have to row to beat the rocks; the dove lost only its tail feathers. The Argonauts rowed mightily to get through and lost only part of the stern ornament. After that, the Symplegades stopped moving permanently.

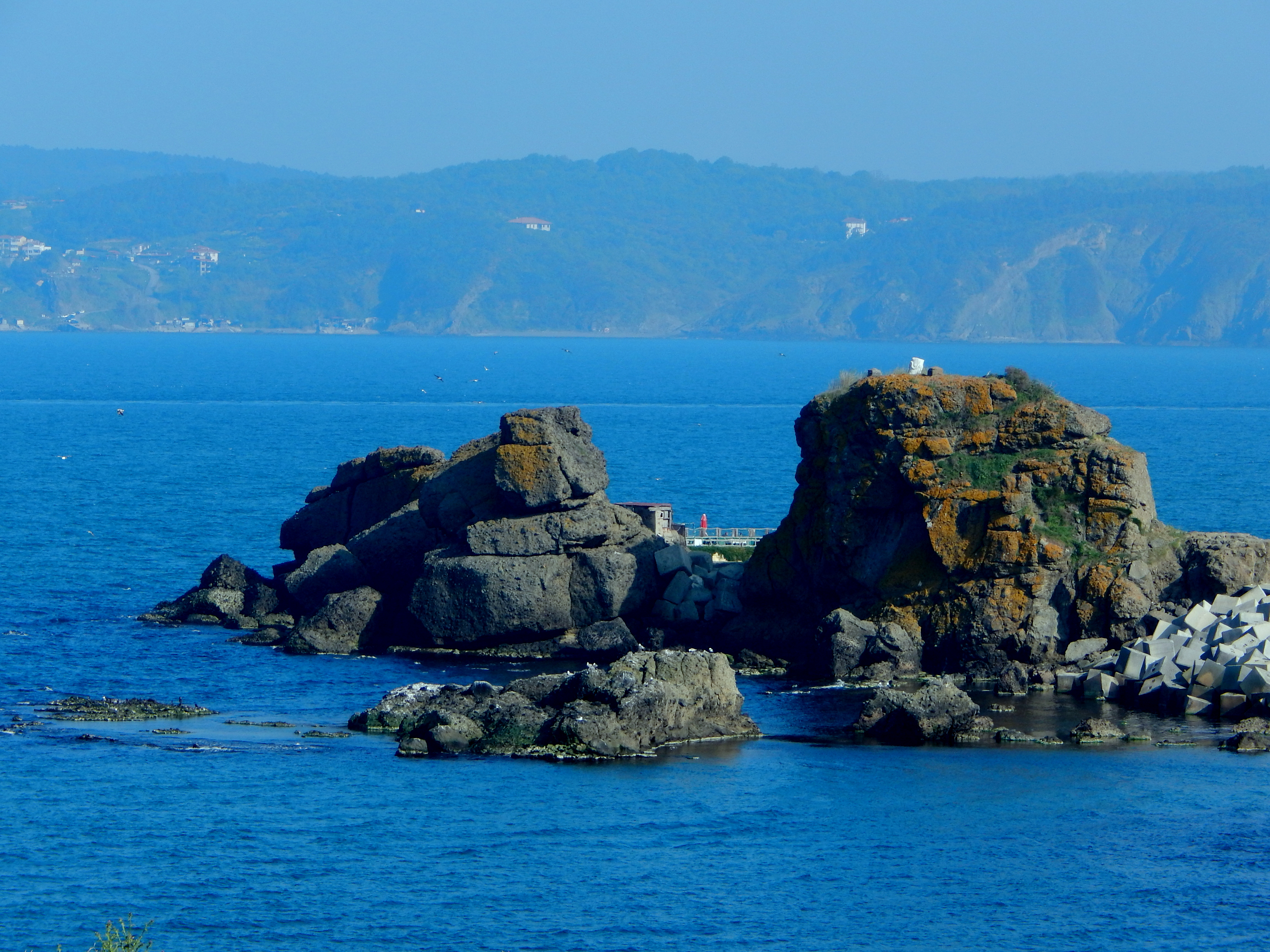
Rocky islet at Rumelifeneri

The European rock is usually identified with an islet, about 20 metres (66 ft) wide and 200 metres (660 ft) long, which stands about 100 metres (330 ft) off the shore of a village called Rumelifeneri ('Lighthouse of Rumeli'), and is connected to it by a modern concrete jetty. At its highest point, there is an ancient altar known as the Pillar of Pompey, though it has nothing to do with Pompey. Dionysius of Byzantium mentions a Roman shrine to Apollo on one of the Cyanean Rocks, and the 16th-century French traveller Petrus Gyllius thought the altar was a remnant of that shrine.

The Asian rock is probably a reef off the Yum Burnu (north of Anadolu Feneri 'Lighthouse of Anatolia'), described by Gyllius:

The reef is divided into four rocks above water which, however, are joined below; it is separated from the continent by a narrow channel filled with many stones, by which as by a staircase one can cross the channel with dry feet when the sea is calm; but when the sea is rough, waves surround the four rocks into which I said the reef is divided. Three of these are low and more or less submerged, but the middle one is higher than the European rock, sloping up to an acute point and roundish right up to its summit; it is splashed by the waves but not submerged and is everywhere precipitous and straight.

== Names ==
The Romans called them Cyaneae Insulae ("Blue Islands"), and in Turkish they are called Öreke Taşı ("Distaff Rock" or "Midwife's Stool").

== In literature ==
Lord Byron refers to the Symplegades in the concluding stanzas of Childe Harold's Pilgrimage:

And from the Alban Mount we now behold
Our friend of youth, that ocean, which when we
Beheld it last by Calp's rock unfold
Those waves, we follow on till the dark Euxine roll'd
Upon the blue Symplegades ...

The New Critic I. A. Richards refers to 'Symplegades' in his work Practical Criticism. In Chapter 2, 'Figurative Language', he refers to dangers of misinterpretation in reading poems: "These twin dangers - careless, 'intuitive' reading and prosaic, 'over-literal' reading - are the Symplegades, the 'justling rocks', between which too many ventures into poetry are wrecked."

In his 1961 novel Jason, Henry Treece depicts the Symplegades as icebergs that drifted downriver into the Black Sea.

== The Wandering Rocks ==
The Symplegades are sometimes identified with (or confused with) the Planctae (Πλαγκταί) or Wandering Rocks, which are mentioned in the Odyssey and Apollonius of Rhodes' Argonautica. In Apollonius's telling, the Symplegades were encountered on the way to the Golden Fleece and the Planctae were encountered on the return voyage.

The similarities and differences between the Wandering Rocks and the Symplegades have been much debated by scholars, as have potential locations for them. (See also Geography of the Odyssey.)

== Bibliography ==
- Apollonius of Rhodes. Argonautica II, 317–340, 549610; IV, 795-979
- Homer. Odyssey XII, 55–72.
- E. V. Rieu. "Glossary" in The Voyage of Argo – The Argonautica – A new translation by E. V. Rieu (London; Penguin Books, 1959)
- Tim Severin The Ulysses Voyage: The search for the Odyssey (London; Arrow Books, 1987) pages 200–214
