= Sea of Cronus =

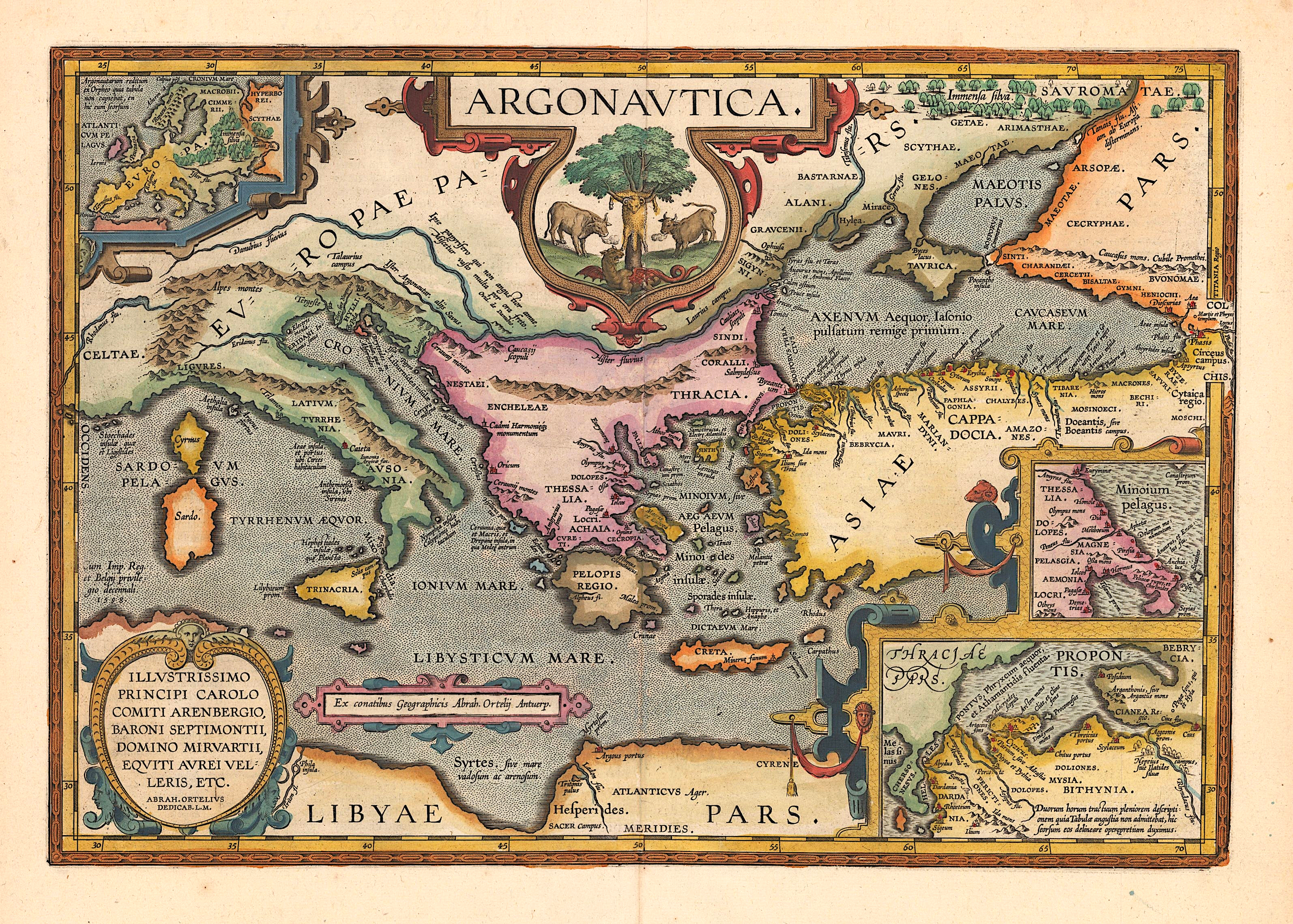
- Argonautica Map from 1624 by Abraham Ortelius

The Sea of Cronus was also referred as the Gulf of Rhea and was what today is called the Adriatic Sea. By the Latinized name 'Cronium Mare' it appeared on many 17th century maps.

== Apollonius Rhodius ==
The gulf mentioned by the Sea of Cronus was one of the seas traversed by the Argonauts in Apollonius Rhodius' Argonautica.

== Ovid ==
In Ovid's Fasti the author mentions the ancient idea that Saturn (identified with Cronus), after Jupiter (identified with Zeus) had dethroned him from the celestial realms in Olympus, had wandered through the seas on a ship until he came to the Tuscan river. Hence the people were called Saturnian and the land Latium (from latente).
From this it may be that the gulf became known as the Sea of Cronus.

== Recent authors ==
In Ignatius Donnelly's Atlantis: The Antediluvian World (1882) the author mentions that the Romans referred to the Atlantic as the 'Cronian Sea'.
