= Planctae =

Group of moving rocks in ancient Greek mythology

In Greek mythology, the Planctae /ˈplæŋktiː/ (Greek: Πλαγκταὶ, Planktai, "Wanderers"), also known as Wandering Rocks, were a group of rocks, between which the sea was mercilessly violent. The Argo (led by Jason) was the only ship to navigate them successfully (with divine help from Hera, Thetis, and the Nereids). Jason chose to brave the Planctae instead of braving Scylla and Charybdis.

In the Odyssey of Homer, the sorceress Circe tells Odysseus of the "Wandering Rocks" or "Roving Rocks" that have only been successfully passed by the Argo when homeward bound. These rocks smash ships and the remaining timbers are scattered by the sea or destroyed by flames. The rocks lie on one of two potential routes to Ithaca; the alternative, which is taken by Odysseus, leads to Scylla and Charybdis. According to Homer, it was Hera, for her love of Jason, who sped the Argo through the Wandering Rocks safely.

The rocks also appear on the journey in the Argonautica by Apollonius of Rhodes, who also locates them near Scylla and Charybdis, but beyond them rather than as an alternative route. Apollonius distinguishes between two sets of dangerous rocks, the Symplegades (Clashing Rocks) and the Planctae. The Symplegades were encountered on the way to the Golden Fleece and the Planctae were encountered on the return voyage. Which god or goddess helped the Argonauts safely sail through the Clashing Rocks is unclear in the text. Athena helped in the former task, while Thetis and her sisters the Nereids helped in the latter one. However, the plans to help Jason pass these obstacles were ultimately orchestrated by Hera according to Apollonius, thus agreeing with Homer.

The similarities and differences between the Wandering Rocks and the Symplegades has been much debated by scholars, as have potential locations for them. (See also Geography of the Odyssey.) As Scylla and Charybdis have often been located in the Straits of Messina, this has led some (like E. V. Rieu) to suggest the Wandering Rocks were located around Sicily, with their flames and smoke coming from Mount Etna. An alternative theory of the geography of the Odyssey places Circe, the Sirens, Scylla & Charybdis and the Wandering Rocks, all mentioned in the stories of both Jason and Odysseus, in northwest Greece. Tim Severin noted that the island of Sesola off the coast of Lefkada looked very similar to the rocks from the Argo story, and also that the area is near a geological fault; he hypothesises that, due to both its similarity with the legends of the Symplegades and the stories of the Argo sailing home via the Adriatic and Ionian Seas, the original legend was copied to the area. Severin also supports his theory with locations for Scylla and Charybdis being located on the other side of Levkas, noting that the name "Cape Skilla" is still used for a nearby headland on the mainland.
