= Gegenees =

Six-armed giants from Greek mythology

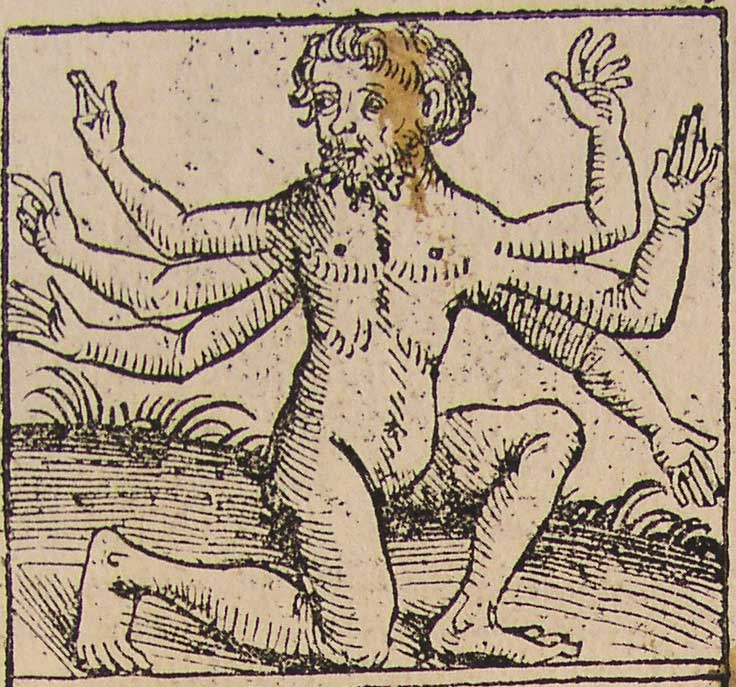
Illustration from the Nuremberg Chronicle (1493)

The Gegenees (from Greek: Γηγενεής Gēgeneēs; Γηγενής Gēgenēs, "earth-born" or "indigenous") were a race of six-armed humanoids who inhabited the same island as the Doliones in the ancient Greek epic Argonautica. They were also called Gegeines.

== Mythology ==
Jason and the Argonauts landed on an island where the Gegenees resided. The Argonauts fought them and unknowingly left Heracles on the island where he continued to fight them. The Argonauts returned and were able to help Heracles fight them off.

== Sources ==
- Apollonius Rhodius, Argonautica, edited and translated by William H. Race, Loeb Classical Library No. 1, Cambridge, Massachusetts, Harvard University Press, 2009. ISBN 978-0-674-99630-4. Online version at Harvard University Press.
