= Marshall Gillies =

British classical scholar (1901–1976)

Marshall Macdonald Gillies (27 April 1901 – 21 March 1976) was British classical scholar, Professor of Classics at the University of Hull.

Son of rev. J. Gillies, parish minister of Lesmahagow, he studied at Eton, King's College (Cambridge) (MA), Edinburgh University (PhD), New College (Oxford) and University of Vienna. He was Assistant Lecturer in Greek at the University of Liverpool (1924–1928), Head of Department of Classics on opening of University of Hull (then University College, 1928). Later he became there Professor of Classics, Professor Emeritus after retirement.

== Publications ==
- The Argonautica of Apollonius Rhodius. Book III. Edited with introduction and commentary. Cambridge: University Press, 1928 (reprinted New York: Arno Press, 1979).

== Sources ==
- Who was Who. Vol. VII: 1971–1980. P. 298.
