= Macris =

Nurse of Hera and Dionysus

- Eponym of Macris
- Abode: Euboea, later Corfu

Genealogy
- Parents: Aristaeus
- Siblings: Actaeon

In Greek mythology, Macris (Ancient Greek: Μακρἰς), also called Nysa (Ancient Greek: Νύσα), is a daughter of Aristaeus who reared the goddess Hera in her youth, before incurring the wrath of the goddess and being banished by her.

== Family ==
Macris was a daughter of Aristaeus, a rustic god and son of Apollo. She was also called Nysa.

== Mythology ==
Macris became the nursemaid of the young goddess Hera, who was brought up in Euboea, an island off the coast of Boeotia. One day Hera was carried off by her brother Zeus who concealed themselves in Mount Cithaeron. Macris crossed over the mainland looking for her young ward, but when she attempted to search the place and in particularly the spot the two were hiding, the mountain king-god Cithaeron prevented her from doing so, lying that Zeus was taking his pleasure with Leto there, so Macris went away and Hera escaped discovery. Later Hera shared an altar with Leto in gratitude.

Some time later, Hermes or Zeus himself took the infant Dionysus and brought him to Macris, who nursed him and fed him honey. As punishment, Hera exiled Macris who fled to the island of Corcyra, where Demeter taught the Titans the art of agriculture for Macris' sake. The island was called Macris ("long") after her, and the cave she chose to dwell in later beheld the wedding and consummation of Jason and Medea, so it was called Medea's Cave thereafter.

Macris, along with the rest of Dionysus' retinue, is said to have lamented Lycurgus' violent rejection and expulsion of Dionysus and his rites from Thrace.

== Symbolism ==
The island of Euboea was sacred to Hera, and thus one of the several—but far from only—places that claimed to be the site of Zeus and Hera's first prenuptial union.

== See also ==
Other nurses in Greek mythology:

- Melissa
- Cyllene
- Ino

== Bibliography ==
- Apollonius of Rhodes, Argonautica, edited and translated by William H. Race, Loeb Classical Library No. 1, Cambridge, Massachusetts, Harvard University Press, 2009. ISBN 978-0-674-99630-4. Online version at Harvard University Press.
- Diodorus Siculus, Library of History, Volume III: Books 4.59-8, translated by C. H. Oldfather, Loeb Classical Library No. 340. Cambridge, Massachusetts, Harvard University Press, 1939. ISBN 978-0-674-99375-4. Online version at Harvard University Press. Online version by Bill Thayer.
- Gifford, E. H. (1903). Eusebii Pamphyli Evangelicae Praeparationis. Vol. III. Oxford, E. Typographeo Academico.
- Hard, Robin (2004). The Routledge Handbook of Greek Mythology: Based on H. J. Rose's "Handbook of Greek Mythology". Routledge. ISBN 9780415186360.
- Nonnus, Dionysiaca; translated by Rouse, W H D, II Books XVI-XXXV. Loeb Classical Library No. 345, Cambridge, Massachusetts, Harvard University Press; London, William Heinemann Ltd. 1940. Internet Archive.
- Plutarch, Moralia, Volume XV: Fragments. Translated by F. H. Sandbach. Loeb Classical Library 429. Cambridge, MA: Harvard University Press, 1969. Available at Loeb Digital Library.
