= Aristaeus =

God of rural crafts in Greek mythology

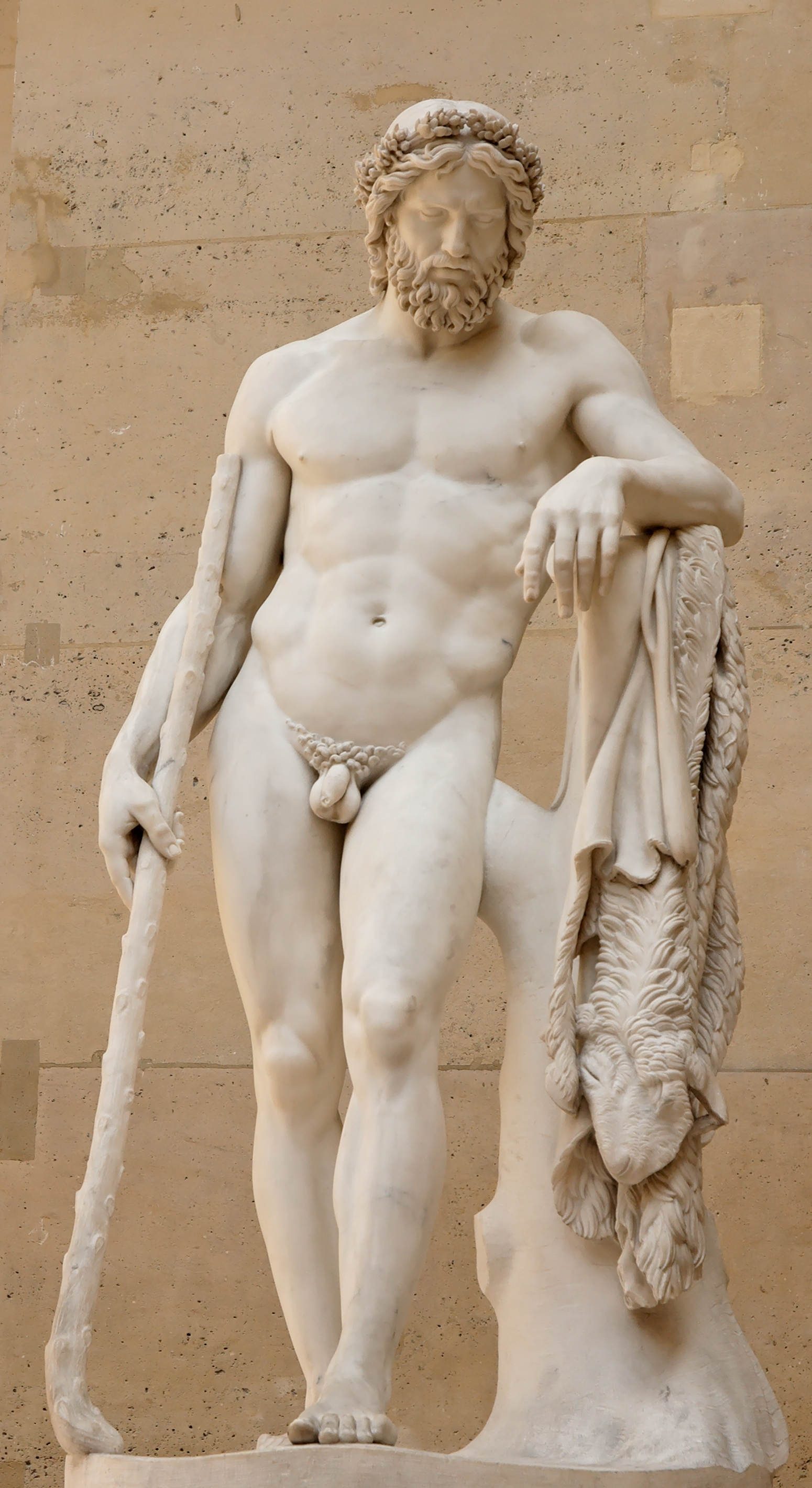
- Aristaeus by François Joseph Bosio (1768–1845), (Musée du Louvre)
- Abode: Libya

Genealogy
- Parents: Apollo and Cyrene
- Consort: Autonoë
- Children: Actaeon and Macris (aka Nysa)

Aristaeus (/ærɪˈstiːəs/; Ancient Greek: Ἀρισταῖος, romanized: Aristaios) was the mythological culture hero credited with the discovery of many rural useful arts and handicrafts, including beekeeping. He was the son of the huntress Cyrene and Apollo.

Aristaeus ("the best") was a cult title in many places: Boeotia, Arcadia, Ceos, Sicily, Sardinia, Thessaly, and Macedonia; consequently a set of "travels" was imposed, connecting his epiphanies in order to account for these widespread manifestations.

If Aristaeus was a minor figure at Athens, he was more prominent in Boeotia, where he was "the pastoral Apollo", and was linked to the founding myth of Thebes by marriage with Autonoë, daughter of Cadmus, the founder. Aristaeus may appear as a winged youth in painted Boeotian pottery, similar to representations of the Boreads, spirits of the North Wind. Besides Actaeon and Macris (also known as Nysa), he also was said to have fathered Charmus and Callicarpus in Sardinia.

== Mythological accounts ==
=== Pindar's account ===
According to Pindar's ninth Pythian Ode and Apollonius' Argonautica (II.522ff), Cyrene despised spinning and other womanly arts and instead spent her days hunting and shepherding, but, in a prophecy he put in the mouth of the wise centaur Chiron, Apollo would spirit her to Libya and make her the foundress of a great city, Cyrene, in a fertile coastal plain. When Aristaeus was born, according to what Pindar sang, Hermes took him to be raised on nectar and ambrosia and to be made immortal by Gaia.

"Aristaios" ("the best") is an epithet rather than a name:

For some men to call Zeus and holy Apollo.
Agreus and Nomios, and for others Aristaios (Pindar)

=== Diodorus Siculus' account ===
According to Diodorus Siculus' Library Aristaeus was born in Libya and nurtured by Nymphs who gave him the added names Nomius and Agreus and taught him to curdle milk, make bee hives and cultivate olive-trees, which he subsequently taught to humans. As an adult Aristeus went to Boeotia and married Autonoe, daughter of Cadmus, who bore their son Actaeon.

After Acteon's death at the hand of Artemis, Aristaeus visited the oracle of his father and was told to move to the island of Ceos. Upon arrival Aristeus successfully stopped a plague by offering a sacrifice in the name of all Greeks and left unnamed descendants on the island. After returning to Libya he travelled to the island of Sardinia with the help of his mother where he cultivated the former barren land. He proceeded to visit multiple different places, namely Sicily, where he was especially honored and Thrace where Dionysus initiated him into his secret rites. Finally he settled on Mount Haemus in northern Thrace and from which point on he ceased appearing to mortals and was revered as a god by both Greek and non-Greek peoples.

=== In Virgil's Georgics ===
Soon after Aristaeus' inadvertent hand in the death of Eurydice—whose husband, Orpheus, in one version, is Aristaeus' own half-brother, via Apollo (another version says that her husband, Orpheus, was fathered by Oeagrus)—his bees became sickened and began to die. Seeking counsel, first from his mother, Cyrene, and then from Proteus, Aristaeus learns that the bees' death was a punishment for causing the death of Eurydice, from her nymph sisters. To make amends, Aristaeus needed to sacrifice 12 animals (or four bulls and four cows) to the gods, and in memory of Eurydice, leave the carcasses in the place of sacrifice, and to return three days later. He followed these instructions, establishing sacrificial altars before a fountain, as advised, sacrificed the aforementioned cattle, and left their carcasses. Upon returning there days later, Aristaeus found within one of the carcasses new swarms of bees, which he took back to his apiary. The bees were never again troubled by disease.

A variation of this tale was told in the 2002 novel by Sue Monk Kidd, The Secret Life of Bees.

== Patronage ==
Aristaeus is the patron god of numerous rustic activities, which he learnt from various teachers:

- From Chiron, the Muses, and his father Apollo, Aristaeus learned the arts of prophecy, healing and herblore. As such, he presided over physic gardens.
- From Artemis and his mother, Cyrene, Aristaeus learned how to track, hunt, and trap animals, how to dress and prepare their meat and skins, and how to use nets and traps.
- From the Thessalian nymphs who raised him, Aristaeus learned other useful arts and mysteries: dairying and how to prepare milk for cream, butter, oxygala and cheese; how to keep chickens for their eggs; how to tame bees and keep them in hives, and how to use honey and beeswax; how to tame and cultivate the wild oleaster in order to make it bear olives and how to process them into olive oil. As such, Aristaeus is a protector of olive trees, of olive orchards, oliviculture and of olive oil presses.
- Aristaeus is also a patron god of shepherds, herding, sheep shearing, and pastoralism, as well as cattle and pastures.
- From Dionysus, Aristaeus learned how to produce alcoholic beverages such as wine and mead. As such, he is worshipped as a protector of grapevines, vineyards, winepresses and of viticulture.
- From Demeter, Aristaeus learned agriculture, horticulture, fungiculture and animal husbandry. As such, he was a protector of gardens, farms, fields, and orchards. Some versions also credit Demeter with teaching him leather-making.
- Aristaeus is also a patron god of fruit trees, herbs, spices, edible flowers, fungi, as well as foraging, hunting, fishing, husbandry, agriculture, food preservation, and condiments.
- From Hestia, Aristaeus learned of cooking and baking. He presided over quern-stones, gristmills, watermills, and ovens.
- From Poseidon, Aristaeus learned fishing and spearfishing.
- From Athena, Aristaeus learned to weave and to card and hand-spin fibres into wool and thread. He is the patron of ropemaking, net-making, basket weaving, and working clay and glass.
- From Hephaestus, Aristaeus learned how to work with metal, stone, clay, glass, and wood. He presides over clay kilns, masonry ovens, and charcoal piles.
- In Ceos, Aristaeus is a god of the Etesian winds.

== Issue ==
When he was grown, he sailed from Libya to Boeotia, where he was inducted into further mysteries in the cave of Chiron the centaur. In Boeotia, he was married to Autonoë and became the father of the ill-fated Actaeon, who inherited the family passion for hunting, to his ruin, and of Macris (also known as Nysa), who nursed the child Dionysus.

According to Pherecydes, Aristaeus fathered Hecate, goddess of witchcraft, crossroads, and the night. Hesiod's Theogony suggests her parents were Perses and Asteria.

== Aristaeus in Ceos ==
Aristaeus' presence in Ceos, attested in the fourth and third centuries BC, was attributed to a Delphic prophecy that counselled Aristaeus to sail to Ceos, where he would be greatly honored. He found the islanders suffering from sickness under the stifling and baneful effects of the Dog-Star Sirius at its first appearance before the sun's rising, in early July. In the foundation legend of a specifically Cean weather-magic ritual, Aristaeus was credited with the double sacrifice that countered the deadly effects of the Dog-Star, a sacrifice at dawn to Zeus Ikmaios, "Rain-making Zeus" at a mountaintop altar, following a pre-dawn chthonic sacrifice to Sirius, the Dog-Star, at its first annual appearance, which brought the annual relief of the cooling Etesian winds.

In a development that offered more immediate causality for the myth, Aristaeus discerned that the Ceans' troubles arose from murderers hiding in their midst, the killers of Icarius in fact. When the miscreants were found out and executed, and a shrine erected to Zeus Ikmaios, the great god was propitiated and decreed that henceforth, the Etesian wind should blow and cool all the Aegean for forty days from the baleful rising of Sirius, but the Ceans continued to propitiate the Dog-Star, just before its rising, just to be sure. Aristaeus appears on Cean coins.

Then Aristaeus, on his civilizing mission, visited Arcadia, where the winged male figure who appears on ivory tablets in the sanctuary of Ortheia as the consort of the goddess, has been identified as Aristaeus by L. Marangou.

Aristaeus settled for a time in the Vale of Tempe. By the time of Virgil's Georgics, the myth has Aristaeus chasing Eurydice when she was bitten by a serpent and died.

== "Aristaeus" as a name ==
In later times, Aristaios was a familiar Greek name, borne by several archons of Athens and attested in inscriptions.

== See also ==
- Ancient Greek cuisine
- Agriculture in ancient Greece – Part of the economy of ancient Greece
- Thriae – Bee women / nymphs from Greek mythology, Ancient Greek goddesses of bees
- Bee (mythology) – Mythological depictions of bees; Bees in mythology
- Pan (god) – Ancient Greek god of the wilds, shepherds, and flocks
- Priapus, a mutual minor rustic god of livestock, fruit plants, gardens.
- Melissa (mythology) – Characters in Greek mythology
- Mellona – Ancient Roman goddess, Ancient Roman bee goddess
- Fu Xi – Culture hero in Chinese legend, an important culture hero from the Chinese mythology who bears some strong resemblances to Aristaios as a teacher of mortals
