= Naubolus =

Scientific classification
- Kingdom: Animalia
- Phylum: Arthropoda
- Subphylum: Chelicerata
- Class: Arachnida
- Order: Araneae
- Infraorder: Araneomorphae
- Family: Salticidae
- Subfamily: Salticinae
- Genus: Naubolus; Simon, 1901

Type species
- N. micans Simon, 1901

Species
- 9, see text

Genus of spiders

Naubolus is a genus of South American jumping spiders that was first described by Eugène Louis Simon in 1901.

== Species ==
As of July 2019 it contains nine species, found in Paraguay, Argentina, Guyana, and Brazil:

- Naubolus albopunctatus Mello-Leitão, 1943 – Brazil
- Naubolus melloleitaoi Caporiacco, 1947 – Guyana
- Naubolus micans Simon, 1901 (type) – Brazil
- Naubolus pallidus Mello-Leitão, 1945 – Argentina
- Naubolus posticatus Simon, 1901 – Brazil
- Naubolus sawayai Soares & Camargo, 1948 – Brazil
- Naubolus simplex Mello-Leitão, 1946 – Paraguay
- Naubolus trifasciatus Mello-Leitão, 1927 – Brazil
- Naubolus tristis Mello-Leitão, 1922 – Brazil
