= Hecale (poem) =

Ancient Greek poem by Callimachus

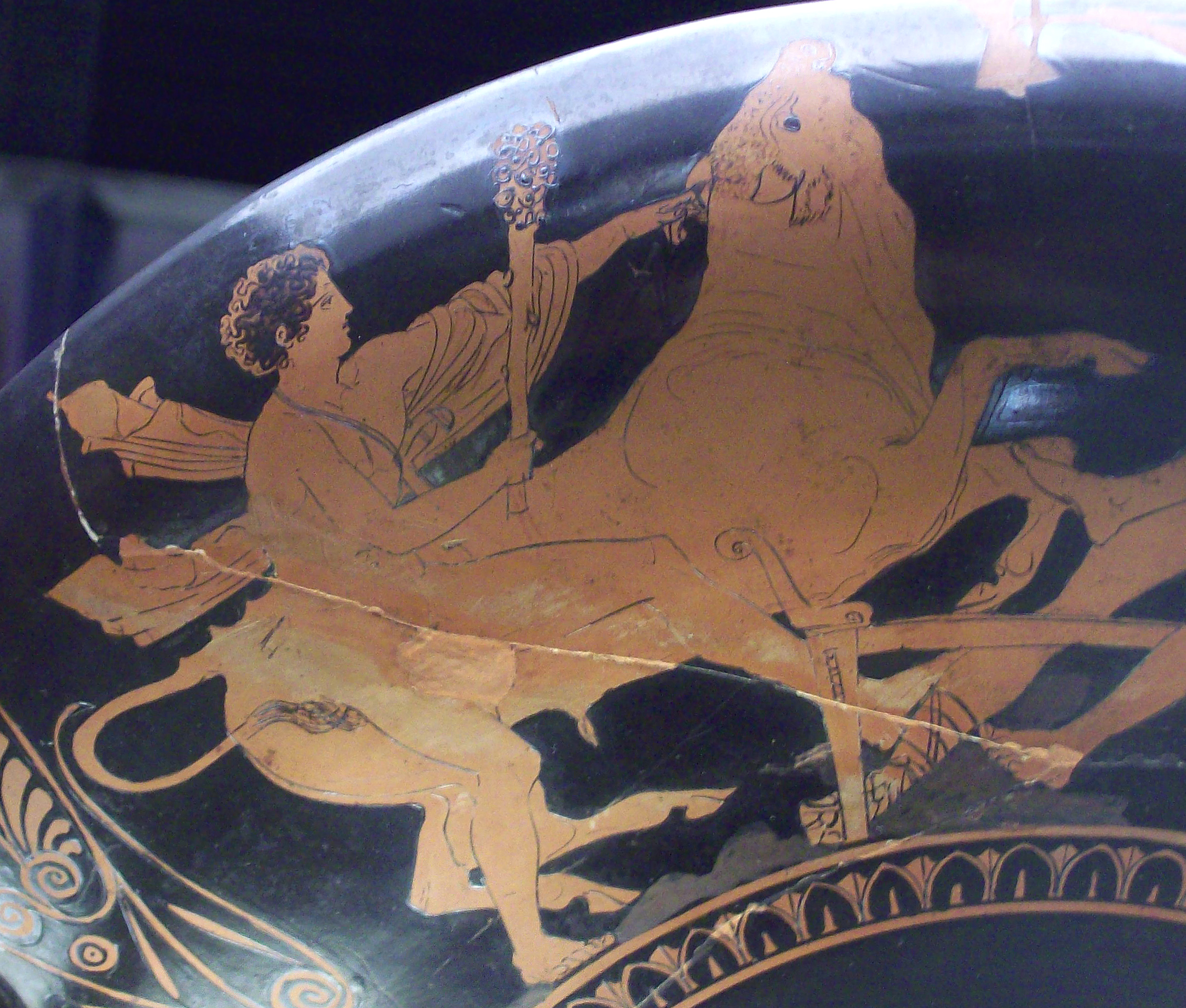
Theseus captures the Marathonian Bull (Aison Cup, c. 430 BC)

The "Hecale" (Ancient Greek: Ἑκάλη, Hekalē) is a fragmentary Greek epyllion written by Callimachus during the third century BCE. The eponymous heroine of the poem was an impoverished Attic widow with whom Theseus stayed on his way to subdue the Marathonian Bull. On his return from accomplishing this feat, Theseus found that his hostess had died, and, in return for her humble hospitality, the hero founded a deme named for her and established there a sanctuary of Zeus Hecaleus in her honor. Although poorly preserved by papyrus fragments and quotations in ancient authors, the broad outline of the Hecale is relatively certain, and the text stands as an important witness to the poorly understood genre of the Hellenistic epyllion. It was also extremely influential and was alluded to by later Hellenistic poets and, later, Roman writers such as Lucretius, Horace, Ovid and Apuleius.

The Rainer Fragments of the Hecale are one of the most important sources of our knowledge of the Hecale. They are preserved on a piece of a wooden tablet now in the papyri collection of Archduke Rainer in the Royal Library at Vienna, and were first published by Theodor Gomperz in volume VI of the Mitteilungen aus der Sammlung Papyrus Erzherzog Rainer. The character of the writing, according to Wessely, assigns the tablet to the 4th century AD.

== Editions and translations ==
=== Critical editions ===
- Pfeiffer, R. (1949), Callimachus, vol. i: Fragmenta, Oxford, ISBN 978-0198141150.
- Pfeiffer, R. (1953), Callimachus, vol. ii: Hymni et epigrammata, Oxford, ISBN 978-0198141167.
- Lloyd-Jones, H.; et al. (1983), Supplementum Hellenisticum, Berlin, ISBN 978-3110081718.
- Hollis, A.S. (2009), Callimachus: Hecale (2nd. rev. ed.), Oxford, ISBN 978-0199562466.

== Bibliography ==
- Curley, D. (2003), "Splendidior Vitro: Horace and Callimachus", CP, 98: 280–3, JSTOR 1215560.
- Hunter, R.L. (1996), "Hecale", in S. Hornblower; A. Spawforth (eds.), Oxford Classical Dictionary (3rd rev. ed.), Oxford, ISBN 9780198661726.
- Lehnus, L. (2003), "Callimachus (3)", in H. Cancik; H. Schneider (eds.), Brill's New Pauly: Antiquity, vol. 2 (Ark–Cas), ISBN 9789004122659.
- Callimachus, Lycophron, Aratus. Hymns and Epigrams. Lycophron: Alexandra. Aratus: Phaenomena., Loeb Classical Library, vol. 129, translated by Mair, A. W.; Mair, G. R., Cambridge, MA: Harvard University Press, 1921.
