= Aetia (Callimachus) =

Ancient Greek poem by Callimachus

- by Callimachus
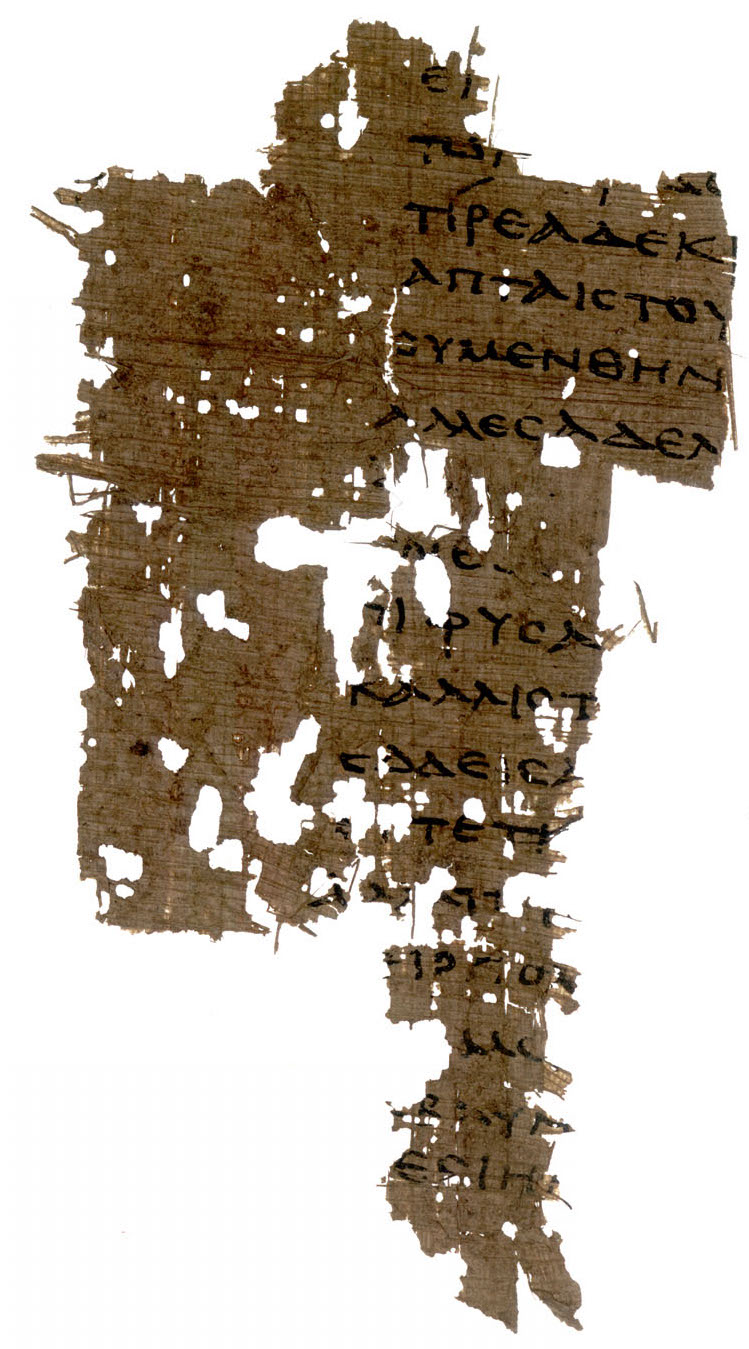
- Papyrus fragment containing part of the proem to the Aetia
- Language: Ancient Greek
- Genre: Aetiology
- Meter: Elegiac couplet
- Lines: c. 4,000

The Aetia (Ancient Greek: Αἴτια, romanized: Aitia, lit. 'causes') is an ancient Greek poem by the Alexandrian poet Callimachus. As an aetiological poem, it presents a large collection of origin myths in four books of elegiac couplets. Although the poem cannot be precisely dated, scholars estimate it was probably composed between 270 and 240 BC.

Emerging from a tradition of writing going back to the poems of Homer, the Aetia provides the earliest source for almost every myth it relates. The stories of Books 1 and 2 have a dialectic structure, wherein characters engage in a discussion or debate. Books 3 and 4 offer a diverse range of linked dramatic settings. Two poems dedicated to Berenice II of Egypt—Victory of Berenice and Lock of Berenice—bookend the poem's second half.

Widely read in antiquity, the poem elicited responses from several Roman poets. A translation of the Lock of Berenice by Catullus inspired Alexander Pope's The Rape of the Lock (1712). During the High Middle Ages, the Aetia disappeared from circulation. Systematic recovery of the text began during the Renaissance. In the late 20th century, substantial fragments of the poem were recovered following the discovery of the Oxyrhynchus Papyri.

== Name and genre ==
The Greek word αἴτιον (aition, 'cause') means an attempt to explain contemporary phenomena with a story from the mythical past. The title of Callimachus's work can be roughly translated into English as "origins". Derived from the same word, the term 'aetiology' encompasses the study of origins more broadly. Aetiological accounts appear sparsely in the Homeric epics—the Iliad and the Odyssey—but are more frequent in later archaic literature, such as the Homeric Hymns and Hesiod's Theogony. By the Classical period, aetiological aspects were common features of Attic tragedy and epinician poetry.

For example, the plays of Aeschylus and Euripides attempted to explain Athenian rituals by setting them in the mythical past. In the Hellenistic period, a rising interest in the genre led to ever more obscure origin stories being incorporated within literary works. Apart from Callimachus himself—who had woven aetiologies into his other poems—his contemporary Apollonius of Rhodes also made frequent use of such stories in the Argonautica.

== Content ==
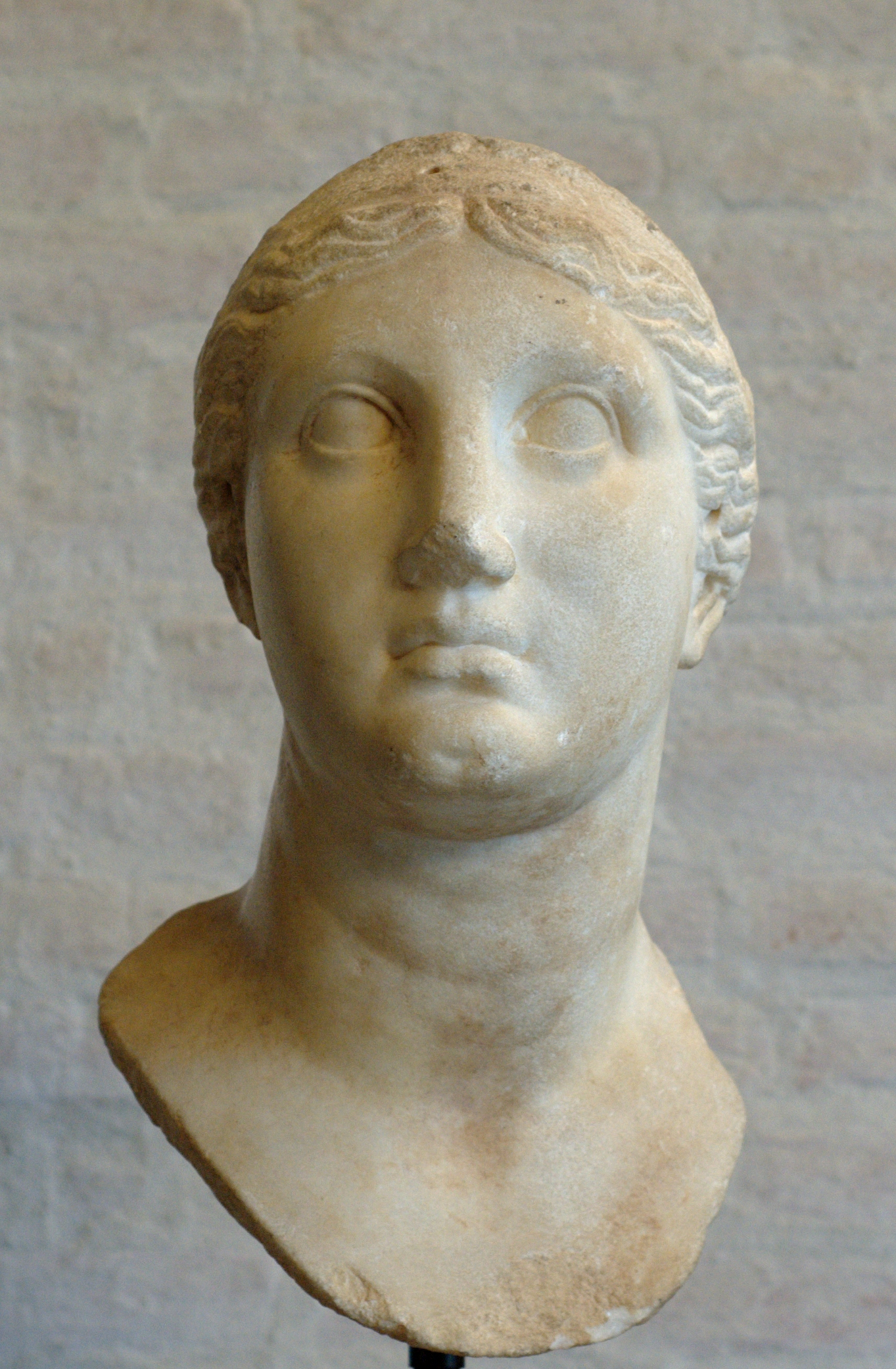
Berenice II of Egypt, to whom part of the Aetia is dedicated. This bust of her is housed in the Munich Glyptothek.

The Aetia contains a collection of origin stories. Ranging in size from a few lines to extensive narratives, they are unified by a common metre—the elegiac couplet. With a few exceptions, the collection is the earliest extant source for most of the myths it presents. The poem is thought to have had about 4,000 lines and is organised into four individual books, which are divided in halves on stylistic grounds.

=== Books 1 and 2 ===
After the proem, Callimachus describes a dream in which, as a young man, he was transported by the Muses to Mount Helicon in Boeotia. In a variation on a famous scene from Hesiod's Theogony, the young poet interrogates the goddesses about the origins of unusual present day customs. This dialogue frames all aetiologies presented in the first book. The stories in the book include those of Linus and Coroebus, Theiodamas, king of the Dryopes and the voyage of the Argonauts.

The second book continues the first's dialectic structure and may have been set a symposium at Alexandria, where Callimachus worked as a librarian and scholar. Since most of its content has been lost, little is known about Book 2. The only aetiology commonly assumed to have been placed in the book are the stories Busiris, king of Egypt, and Phalaris, the tyrant of Akragas, who were known for their excessive cruelty.

=== Books 3 and 4 ===
The second half of the Aetia does not follow the pattern established in Books 1 and 2. Instead, individual aetiologies are set in a variety of dramatic situations and do not form a contiguous narrative. The books are framed by two well known narratives: Book 3 opens with the Victory of Berenice. Composed in the style of a Pindaric Ode, the self-contained poem celebrates queen Berenice's victory in the Nemean Games. Enveloped within the epinician narrative is an aetiology of the games themselves. The end of Book 4 and the Aetia as a whole is marked by another court poem, the Lock of Berenice. In it, Callimachus relates how the queen gave a lock of her hair as a votive offering which later became a constellation, the Coma Berenices ("Hair of Berenice"). Another notable story from the second half of the work is the love story of Acontius and Cydippe.

== Textual history ==
=== Composition ===
While exact dating of the Aetia is uncertain, it has been estimated that the text was composed between 270 and 240 BC. Some parts of the poem have been dated to an early phase in Callimachus's career, suggesting 270 BC as an approximate starting date for the poem's composition. Books 3 and 4, by contrast, mention queen Berenice II of Egypt, which means that at least part of the work must have been composed around the time of her accession in the 246 BC. Attempting to reconcile these disparate dates, scholars have suggested that the poem's first half was written at an earlier stage of the poet's life and that the last two books were added during the reign of Berenice II. Hellenist Annette Harder, on the other hand, writes that Callimachus began working on the Aetia in his youth and kept developing its content throughout his life.

=== Transmission ===
Having been read widely during the Roman Empire, the Aetia was still in circulation during the transition to the Early Middle Ages: the epistolographer Aristaenetus, the poet Nonnus and the monk Marianus of Auxerre show their familiarity with the text around the year 500 AD. The poem is thought to have been available during the Byzantine Empire, with 12th-century scholar Eustathius of Thessalonica being the last person to display first hand knowledge of its content.

The Aetia disappeared from circulation in the 13th century; two centuries later, the Florentine scholar Poliziano sought to reconstruct the text from brief quotations found in other classical works. Although restoration efforts have continued since, a breakthrough was only achieved after the discovery in 1898 of the Oxyrhynchus Papyri in Egypt. Hence, the 20th century saw the publication of many fragments of the poem recovered from papyrus scraps found at Oxyrhynchus, culminating in 1976 with the publication of the substantial Victory of Berenice fragment. Together with the diegeseis, a collection of prose summaries, these fragments have allowed scholars to form a fairly comprehensive overview of the poem.

== Reception ==
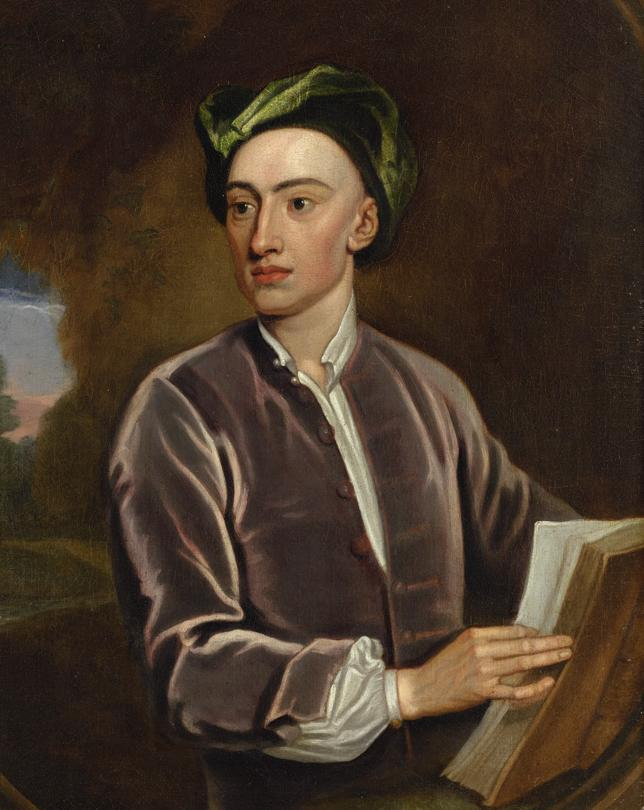
The English poet Alexander Pope, from the studio of Godfrey Kneller. His poem The Rape of the Lock was inspired by Catullus's translation of a section of the Aetia.

Like all poems by Callimachus, the Aetia was read and studied widely by Roman poets of the Republic and early empire. Their interaction was most sustained in the Augustan era. Announcing his attention to be a "Roman Callimachus" in the prologue to his fourth book, the elegist Propertius introduced aetiological material evoking the story of Acontius and Cydippe into his love poems. The Fasti, a didactic poem about the Roman calendar by Ovid, has, in the words of classicist Alessandro Barchiesi, "the strongest claim to be a full-scale imitation of the Aetia". However, not all Roman commentators held favourable views of the work: the epigrammatist Martial dedicated a poem (10.4) to the sentiment that the Aetia, with its obscure mythological content, was irrelevant to contemporary Roman life.

One aetiology in particular, the Lock of Berenice, has been subject to well known imitations. In the first century BC, the Roman poet Catullus wrote a Latin translation of the story which has been handed down as his poem 66. Catullus's composition, in turn, provided inspiration for the narrative poem The Rape of the Lock, published by the English poet Alexander Pope in 1712.

Modern critics have stressed the Aetia's prominent place in the study of Callimachus. The poem is regarded by classicist Kathryn Gutzwiller as his "most influential and original" work. Latinist Richard F. Thomas, in an article surveying its influence on Roman poetry, describes the Aetia as the "most important poem of the most influential Alexandrian poet". However, he adds that much of its perceived influence remained "speculative" due to the poem's poor state of preservation. Expressing a similar sentiment, Richard L. Hunter, a scholar of Hellenistic literature, states that Roman allusions to a small number of surviving passages from the Aetia have led to an undue prominence of those passages in modern criticism of Callimachus.

== Selected editions ==
- Harder, Anette (2012). Callimachus: Aetia. Oxford. ISBN 978-0-19-958101-6. Two volume edition, includes the Greek text and philological commentary.
- Nisetich, Frank (2001). The Poems of Callimachus. Oxford. ISBN 978-0-19-815224-8. English verse translation.
- Pfeiffer, Rudolf (1949). Callimachus. Oxford. ASIN B000WS4X8U. Critical edition of the Greek text.
- Trypanis, C. A.; Gelzer, T.; Whitman, C. H. (1989). Callimachus: Aetia, Iambi, Hecale and Other Fragments. Cambridge, MA. ISBN 978-0-674-99463-8. Greek text with a facing English translation.

== Works cited ==
- Barchiesi, Alessandro (2011). "Roman Callimachus". In Acosta-Hughes, Benjamin; Lehnus, Luigi; Stephens, Susan (eds.). Brill's Companion to Callimachus. Leiden. pp. 511–33. ISBN 978-90-04-15673-9.
- Clayman, Dee (2011). "Berenice and her Lock" (PDF). TAPA. 141 (2): 229–46. JSTOR 41289743.
- Gutzwiller, Kathryn (2007). A Guide to Hellenistic Literature. Oxford. ISBN 978-0-631-23322-0.
- Harder, Annette (2012). Callimachus: Aetia. Volume 1. Oxford. ISBN 978-0-19-958101-6.
- Hutchinson, Gregory (1997). Hellenistic Poetry. Oxford. ASIN B017C1CRN2.
- Hunter, Richard L. (2012). The Shadow of Callimachus. Cambridge. ISBN 978-0-511-61849-9.
- McNelis, Charles (2007). Statius' Thebaid and the Poetics of Civil War. Cambridge. ISBN 978-0-521-86741-2.
- Parsons, Peter; Kassel, Rudolf (1977). "Victoria Berenices" (PDF). Zeitschrift für Papyrologie und Epigraphik. 25: 1–51. JSTOR 20181342.
- Thomas, Richard F. (1983). "Callimachus, the Victoria Berenices and Roman Poetry" (PDF). Classical Quarterly. 33 (1): 92–113. doi:10.1017/S0009838800034327. JSTOR 638650. S2CID 170886892.
