= Gutzwiller =

Gutzwiller is a surname. Notable people with the surname include:

- Kathryn Gutzwiller, American classicist
- Martin Gutzwiller (1925–2014), Swiss-American physicist
