= Hecale =

Character from the Greek myth of Theseus

In Greek mythology, Hecale (Ancient Greek: Ἑκάλη, romanized: Hekálē) was an old woman who offered succor to Theseus on his way to capture the Marathonian Bull.

== Mythology ==
On the way to Marathon to capture the Bull, Theseus sought shelter from a storm in a shack owned by an ancient lady named Hecale. She swore to make a sacrifice to Zeus if Theseus was successful in capturing the bull. Theseus did capture the bull but when he returned to Hecale's hut, she was dead.

Theseus built a deme in her honor (Hecale was a deme of the tribe Leontis). The legend is described in a fragmentary poem, the Hecale, by Callimachus and in the "Life of Theseus" by Plutarch.

Translation of Plutarch's text:

"Theseus, wishing to be actively employed, and at the same time to win the favour of the people, went out against the Marathonian bull, which was causing no small annoyance to the inhabitants of the Tetrapolis, and he overcame the bull and drove it through the city to exhibitit, after which he sacrificed it to Apollo Delphinius. Hecale and the legend of her reception and entertainment (of Theseus) seem to be not quite without some portion of truth. For the demes round about used to meet and hold a Hecalesian festival in honour of Zeus Hecalus, and honoured Hecale, whom they called by the pet name Hecaline, because when she entertained Theseus, who at the time was quite young, she addressed him as an old woman would and greeted him with that sort of pet names. When Theseus was setting out to the contest she vowed in his behalf to offer a sacrifice to Zeus if he came back safe. She died, however, before his return, and received the above mentioned honours, in return for her hospitality, by order of Theseus, as Philochorus relates."

One of today's Athens northern suburbs, Ekáli, an affluent and very exclusive residential community on the western foot of Mount Penteli, is called by that name.

== Hecalesia ==
Hecalesia (Εκαλήσια), a festival at Athens in honour of Zeus Hecalesius (Ἑκάλειος Ζεύς) and Hecale.
