= Callimachus =

3rd-century BCE Greek poet, scholar and librarian

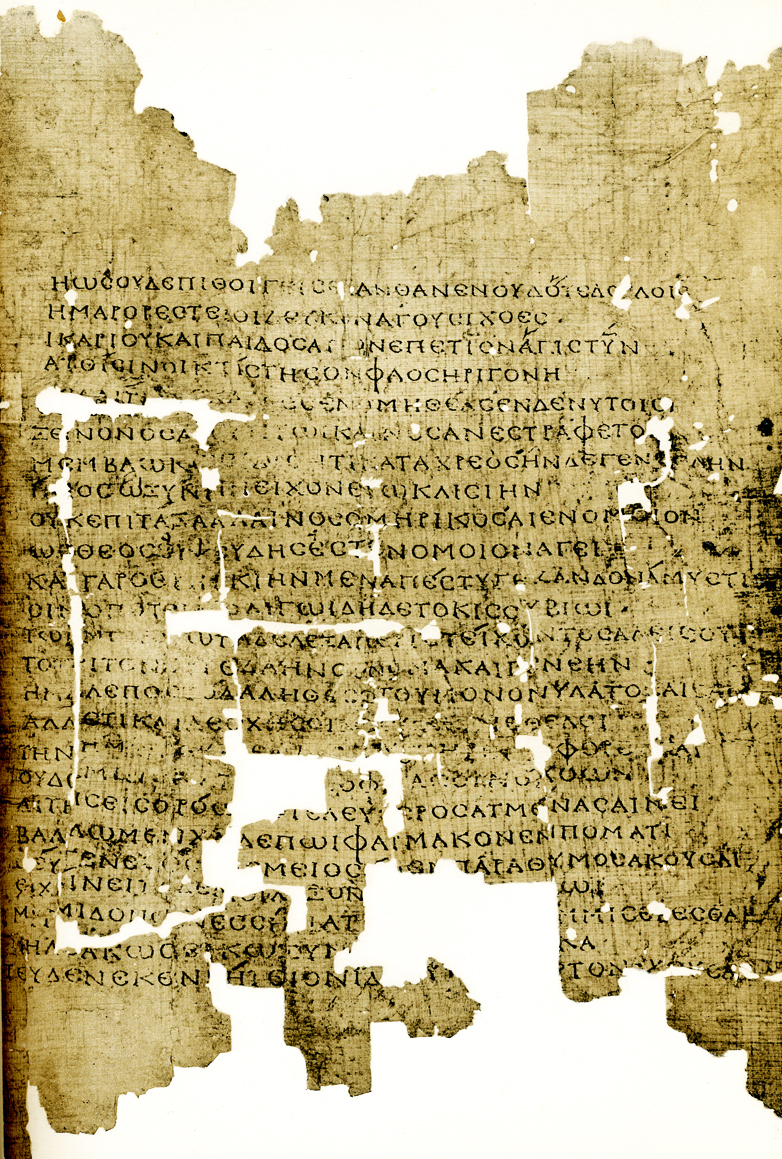
- Papyrus fragment from the Aetia of Callimachus
- Born: c. 310 BC; Cyrene, Ptolemaic Kingdom
- Died: c. 240 BC; Alexandria, Ptolemaic Kingdom
- Writing career
- Period: Hellenistic period
- Genres: Aetiology, Epigram, Iambus, Hymn, Epyllion
- Notable works: Aetia; Hecale

Callimachus (/kəˈlɪməkəs/; Ancient Greek: Καλλίμαχος, romanized: Kallimachos; c. 310 – c. 240 BC) was an ancient Greek poet, scholar, and librarian who was active in Alexandria during the 3rd century BC. A representative of Ancient Greek literature of the Hellenistic period, he wrote over 800 literary works, most of which do not survive, in a wide variety of genres. He espoused an aesthetic philosophy, known as Callimacheanism, which exerted a strong influence on poets of the Roman Empire and, through their reception, on later Western literature.

Born into a prominent family in the Greek city of Cyrene in modern-day Libya, he was educated in Alexandria, the capital of the Ptolemaic kings of Egypt. After working as a schoolteacher in the city, he came under the patronage of King Ptolemy II Philadelphus and was employed at the Library of Alexandria where he compiled the Pinakes, a comprehensive catalogue of all Greek literature. He is believed to have lived into the reign of Ptolemy III Euergetes.

Although Callimachus wrote prolifically in prose and poetry, only a small number of his poetical texts have been preserved. His main works are the Aetia, a four-book aetiological poem, six religious hymns, around 60 epigrams, a collection of satirical iambs, and a narrative poem entitled Hecale. Callimachus shared many characteristics with his Alexandrian contemporaries Aratus, Apollonius of Rhodes and Theocritus, but professed to adhere to a unique style of poetry: favouring small, recondite and even obscure topics, he dedicated himself to small-scale poetry and refused to write longwinded epic poetry, the most prominent literary art of his day.

Callimachus and his aesthetic philosophy became an important point of reference for Roman poets of the late Republic and the early Empire. Catullus, Horace, Vergil, Propertius, and Ovid saw his poetry as one of their "principal model[s]" and engaged with it in a variety of ways. Modern classical scholars view him as one of the most influential Greek poets. According to the Hellenist Kathryn Gutzwiller, he "reinvented Greek poetry for the Hellenistic age by devising a personal style that came, through its manifestations in Roman poetry, to influence the entire tradition of modern literature".

== Life ==
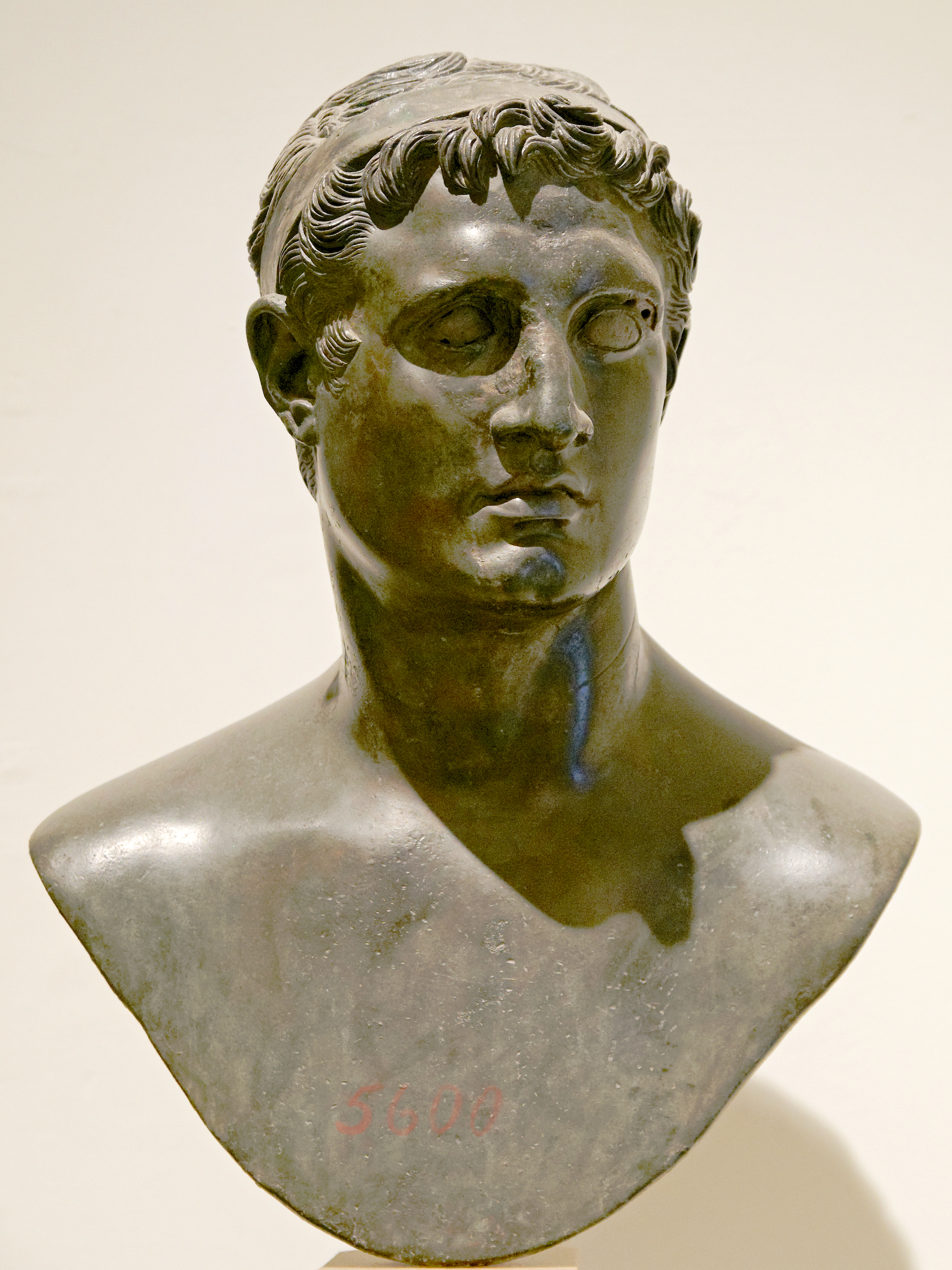
Callimachus is thought to have worked under the patronage of Ptolemy II Philadelphus. This bust of Ptolemy is held at the National Archaeological Museum, Naples.

An entry in the Suda, a 10th-century Byzantine encyclopaedia, is the main source about the life of Callimachus. Although the entry contains factual inaccuracies, it enables the re-construction of his biography by providing some otherwise unattested information. Callimachus was born into a prominent family in Cyrene, a Greek city on the coast of modern-day Libya. He refers to himself as "son of Battus" (Ancient Greek: Βαττιάδης, romanized: Battiades), but this may be an allusion to the city's mythological founder Battus rather than to his father. His grandfather, also named Callimachus, had served the city as a general. His mother's name was Megatima, mistakenly given as Mesatma by the Suda. His unknown date of birth is placed around 310 BC.

During the 280s, Callimachus is thought to have studied under the philosopher Praxiphanes and the grammarian Hermocrates at Alexandria, an important centre of Greek culture. He appears to have experienced a period of relative poverty while working as a schoolteacher in the suburbs of the city. The truthfulness of this claim is disputed by the classicist Alan Cameron who describes it as "almost certainly outright fiction". Callimachus then entered into the patronage of the Ptolemies, the Greek ruling dynasty of Egypt, and was employed at the Library of Alexandria. According to the Suda, his career coincided with the reign of Ptolemy II Philadelphus, who became sole ruler of Egypt in 283 BC. Classicist John Ferguson puts the latest date of Callimachus's establishment at the imperial court at 270 BC.

Despite the lack of precise sources, the outlines of Callimachus's working life can be gathered from his poetry. Poems belonging to his period of economic hardship indicate that he began writing in the 280s BC, while his poem Aetia shows signs of having been composed in the reign of Ptolemy III Euergetes, who ascended to the throne in 246 BC. Contemporary references suggest that Callimachus was writing until about 240 BC, and Ferguson finds it likely that he died by 235 BC, at which time he would have been 75 years old.

== Literary work ==
According to the Suda, Callimachus wrote more than 800 individual works in prose and poetry. The vast majority of his literary production, including all prose output, has been lost with the exception of his Epigrams and Hymns. All other works mentioned below have been preserved in fragments. Callimachus was an admirer of Homer, whom he regarded as impossible to imitate. This could be the reason why he focused on short poems.

=== Epigrams ===
Epigrams, brief, forceful poems originally written on stone and on votive offerings, were already established as a form of literature by the 3rd century BC. Callimachus wrote at least 60 individual epigrams on a wide range of topics. While some of them are dedicatory or sepulchral, others touch on erotic and purely literary themes. Most of them were transmitted in the Palatine Anthology, a 10th-century manuscript discovered in 1606 at Heidelberg containing a collection of Greek epigrams and poems. Often written from a first-person perspective, the Epigrams offer a great variety of styles and draw on different branches of the epigrammatic tradition. According to the Callimachus scholar Benjamin Acosta-Hughes, "[t]heir intelligent play on language, meter, and word placement" have placed the poems among the most prominent works of the Hellenistic period.

=== Hymns ===
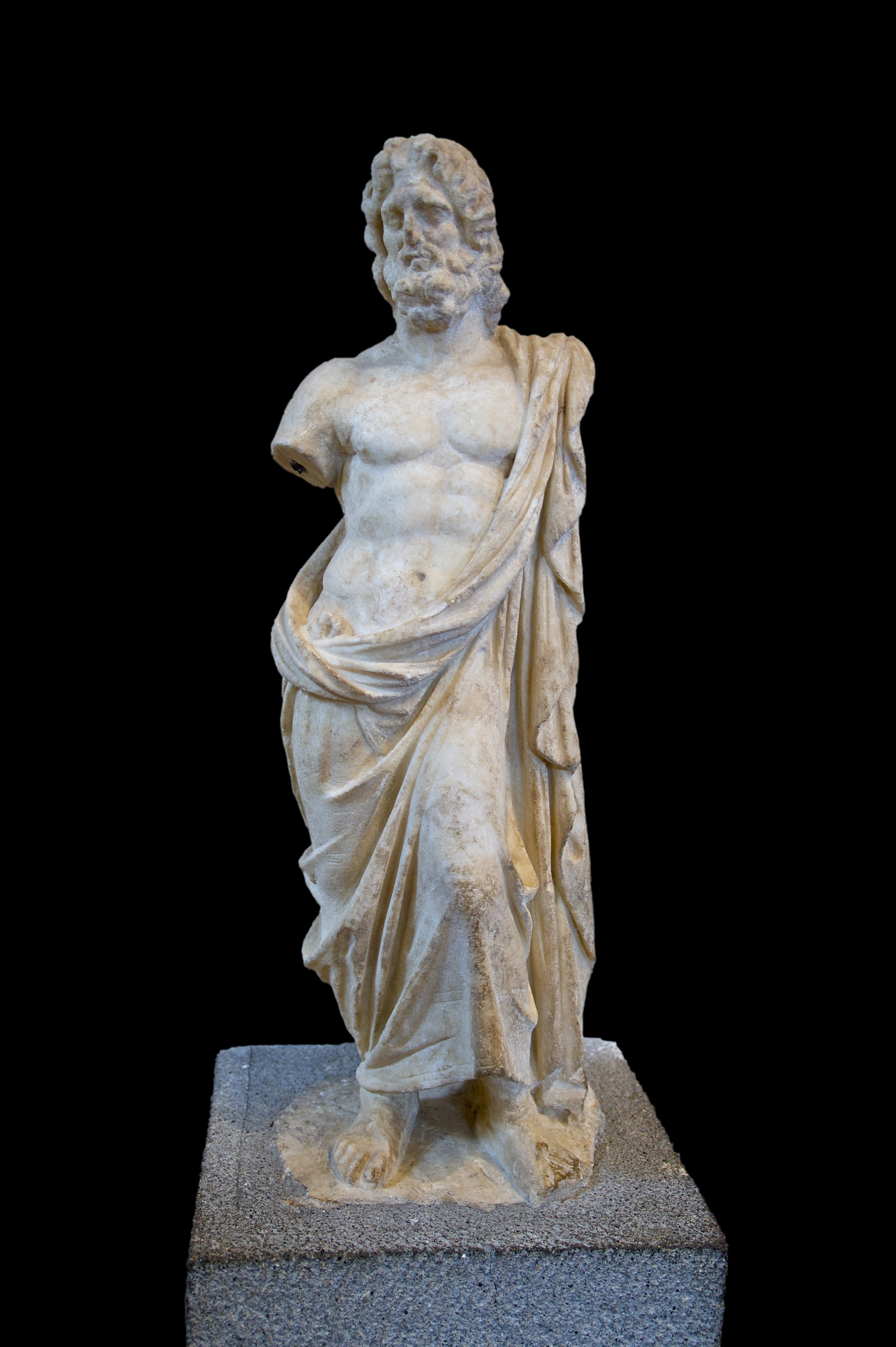
Callimachus wrote six hymns to gods of the Greek Pantheon, including one to Zeus. This statue of the god was found at Camirus and is housed at the Archaeological Museum of Rhodes.

Among the oldest forms of religious writing, hymns were "formal addresses to a god or group of gods on behalf of a community". Cultic hymns were written and performed in honour of a particular god; examples of this genre can be found in most Greek lyric poets. A typical hymn would contain an invocation of the god, praise of his or her attributes, and a concluding prayer with a request for a favour. Callimachus wrote six such hymns, which can be divided into two groups: his Hymn to Apollo, to Demeter and to Athena are considered mimetic because they present themselves as live re-enactments of a religious ritual in which both the speaker and the audience are imagined to take part. The Hymn to Zeus, to Artemis, and to Delos are viewed as non-mimetic since they do not re-create a ritual situation.

It is contested among scholars of ancient literature whether Callimachus's hymns had any real religious significance. The dominant view holds that they were literary creations to be read exclusively as poetry, though some scholars have linked individual elements to contemporary ritual practice. This issue is further complicated by Callimachus's purposeful amalgamation of fiction and potential real-world performance.

=== Aetia ===
The Greek word αἴτιον (aition, 'cause') means an attempt to explain contemporary phenomena with a story from the mythical past. The title of Callimachus's work can be roughly translated into English as "origins". The Aetia contains a collection of origin stories. Ranging in size from a few lines to extensive narratives, they are unified by a common metre—the elegiac couplet. With few exceptions, the collection is the earliest extant source for most of the myths it presents. Throughout the work, the poet's voice repeatedly intrudes into his narratives to offer comments on the dramatic situation. This pattern is described by the Hellenist Kathryn Gutzwiller as one of the poem's most influential features.

The poem is thought to have had about 4,000 lines and is organised into four individual books, which are divided in halves on stylistic grounds. In the first book, Callimachus describes a dream in which, as a young man, he was transported by the Muses to Mount Helicon in Boeotia. The young poet interrogates the goddesses about the origins of unusual present day customs. This dialogue frames all aetiologies presented in the first book. The stories in the book include those of Linus and Coroebus, Theiodamas, king of the Dryopes and the voyage of the Argonauts. The second book continues the first's dialectic structure. It may have been set at a symposium at Alexandria, where Callimachus worked as a librarian and scholar. Since most of its content has been lost, little is known about Book 2. The only aetiology commonly assumed to have been placed in the book are the stories Busiris, king of Egypt, and Phalaris, the tyrant of Akragas, who were known for their excessive cruelty.

The second half of the Aetia does not follow the pattern established in Books 1 and 2. Instead, individual aetiologies are set in a variety of dramatic situations and do not form a contiguous narrative. The books are framed by two well-known narratives: Book 3 opens with the Victory of Berenice. Composed in the style of a Pindaric Ode, the self-contained poem celebrates queen Berenice's victory in the Nemean Games. Enveloped within the epinician narrative is an aetiology of the games themselves. The end of Book 4 and the Aetia as a whole is marked by another court poem, the Lock of Berenice. In it, Callimachus relates how the queen gave a lock of her hair as a votive offering which later became a constellation, Coma Berenices ("Hair of Berenice"). Another notable story from the second half of the work is the love story of Acontius and Cydippe.

=== Iambs ===
At the close of his Aetia, Callimachus wrote that he would proceed to a more pedestrian field of poetry. By this, he referred to his collection of 13 iambs, drawing on an established tradition of iambic poetry whose defining feature was their aggressive, satirical tone. Although the poems are poorly preserved, their content is known from a set of ancient summaries (diegeseis). In the Iambs, Callimachus critically comments on issues of interest, revolving mostly around aesthetics and personal relationships. He uses the polemical tone of the genre to defend himself against critics of his poetic style and his tendency to write in a variety of genres. This is made explicit in the final poem of the collection, where the poet compares himself to a carpenter who is praised for crafting many different objects.

The Iambs are notable for their vivid language. Callimachus couches his aesthetic criticism in vivid imagery taken from the natural and social world: rival scholars are compared to wasps swarming from the ground and to flies resting on a goatherd. He often mixes different metaphors to create effects of "wit and incongruity", such as when a laurel tree is described as "glaring like a wild bull". Ferguson also notes the poems' witty use of proverbs in dialectic passages of dialogue.

=== Hecale ===
Callimachus made only one attempt at writing a narrative poem, a mythological epic entitled Hecale. Since the poem is estimated to run to have had around 1000 lines, it constitutes an epyllion: a shorter form of epic poetry dealing with topics not traditionally present in larger-scale works. It recounts a story about the Greek hero Theseus, who, after liberating the city of Marathon from a destructive bull, was hosted by a poor but kindly old woman named Hecale. They form a friendship as she recounts her former life as a member of the upper class. At the end of the poem, Theseus establishes an annual feast and a sanctuary to Zeus in honour of his host.

Since most of Callimachus's poetry is critical of epic as a genre, there has been some speculation about why he chose to write an epic poem after all. The author of a scholium, an ancient commentary on the work of Callimachus, stated that Callimachus abandoned his reluctance after being ridiculed for not writing lengthy poems. This explanation was probably derived from the poet's own intimation at the start of the Aetia and is therefore of limited authority. According to Cameron, Callimachus may have conceived the Hecale as a model epic according to his own tastes.

== Pinakes ==
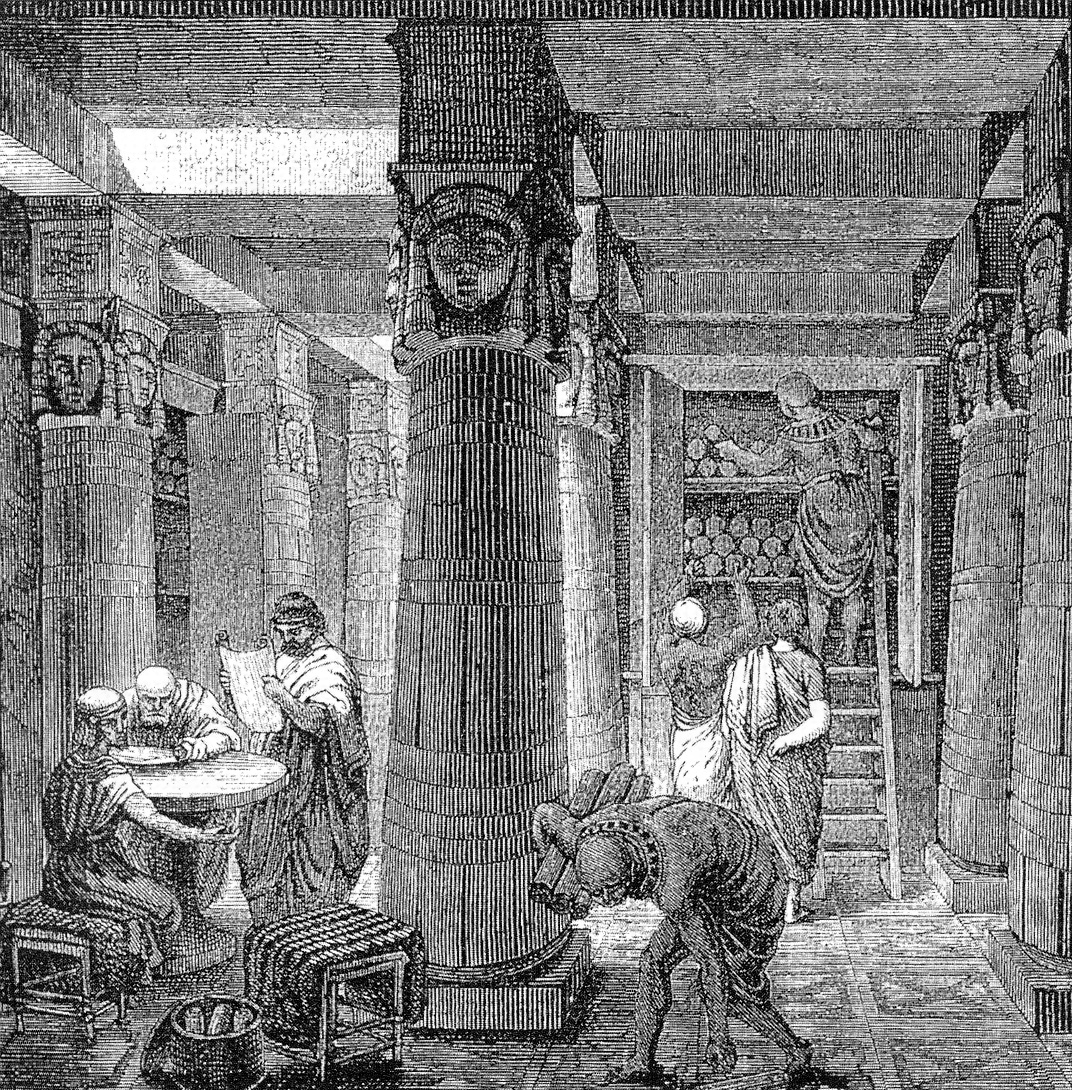
19th-century artistic rendering of the Library of Alexandria, where Callimachus compiled the Pinakes

When working at the Library of Alexandria, Callimachus was responsible for the library's cataloguing. In this function, he compiled a detailed bibliography of all existing Greek literature deriving from the library's shelf-lists. His catalogue, named Pinakes after the plural of the Greek for 'tablet' (Ancient Greek: πίναξ, romanized: pinax), amounted to 120 volumes or five times the length of Homer's Iliad. Although the Pinakes have not survived the end of antiquity, scholars have reconstructed their content from references in surviving classical literature. Authors and their works were divided into the broad categories of 'poetry' and 'prose'. Both categories were further broken down into precise subcategories. For poets, these included, among others, 'drama', 'epic', and 'lyric'; for prose writers, 'philosophy', 'oratory', 'history', and 'medicine'. Entries were sorted alphabetically, giving an author's biography and a list of his works. According to the classicist Lionel Casson, the Pinakes were the first comprehensive bibliographic resource for Greek literature and a "vital reference tool" for using the Alexandrian Library.

== Callimacheanism ==
In his poetry, Callimachus espoused an aesthetic philosophy that has become known as Callimacheanism. He favoured small-scale topics over large and prominent ones, and refinement over long works of poetry. At the beginning of the Aetia, he summarised his poetic programme in an allegory spoken by the god Apollo: "my good poet, feed my victim as fat as possible, but keep your Muse slender. This, too, I order from you: tread the way that wagons do not trample. Do not drive in the same tracks as others or on a wide road but on an untrodden path, even if yours is more narrow." The allegory is directed against the predominant poetic form of the day: heroic epic, which could run to dozens of books in length. Contained in the allegory are two reasons why Callimachus did not write in this genre: firstly, to Callimachus, poetry required a high level of refinement which could not be sustained over the course of a drawn-out work; secondly, most of his contemporaries were writers of epic, creating an over-saturation of the genre which he sought to avoid. Instead, he was interested in recondite, experimental, learned and even obscure topics. His poetry nevertheless surpasses epic in its allusions to previous literature.

Although Callimachus attempted to differentiate himself from other poets, his aesthetic philosophy is sometimes subsumed under the term of Alexandrianism, describing the entirety of Greek literature written in Alexandria during the 3rd century BC. In spite of their differences, his work shares many characteristics with that of his contemporaries including the didactic poet Aratus, the epicist Apollonius of Rhodes, and the pastoral poet Theocritus. They all interacted with earlier Greek literature, especially the poems of Homer and Hesiod. Drawing on the Library of Alexandria, they all displayed an interest in intellectual pursuits, and they all attempted to revive neglected forms of poetry.

Callimachus used both direct and indirect characterization in his works. The use of comparisons and similes is rather sparse. The use of intertextuality is observed in Hymn 6, where descriptions of other characters are offered in order to provide contrast to the characterization of the main character. Frequent allusions to the Odyssey and the Iliad appear, for example reference to Antilochus in Hymn 6. Some Homeric influences can be seen through the use of Homeric hapaxes, such as katōmadian.

== Reception ==
=== Ancient ===
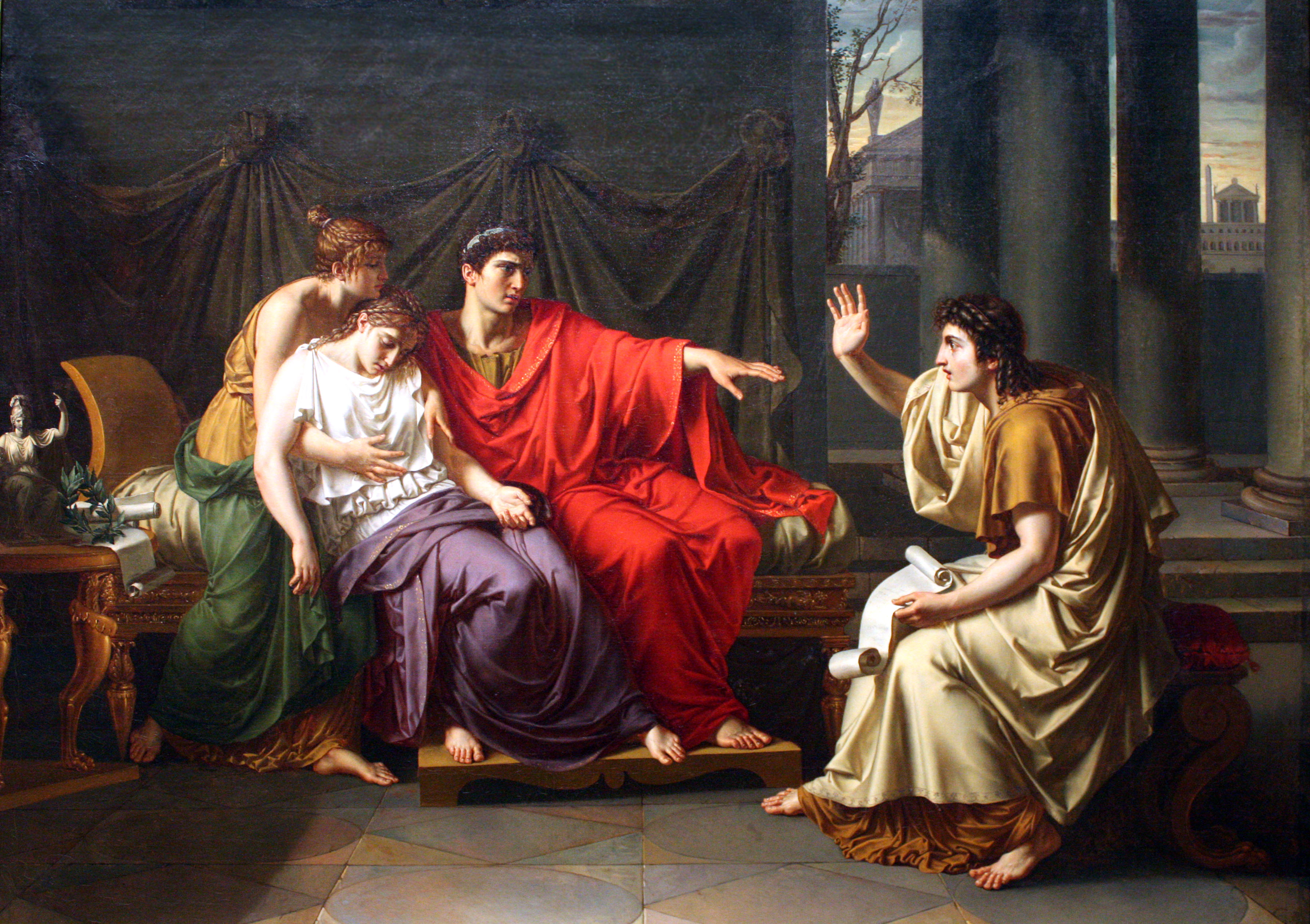
Vergil's Aeneid interacts frequently with the work of Callimachus. This late-18th-century painting by Jean-Baptiste Wicar shows Vergil reciting his poem to the emperor Augustus.

Callimachus and his aesthetic philosophy became an important point of reference for Roman poets of the late Republic and the early Empire. Catullus, Horace, Vergil, Propertius, and Ovid saw his poetry as one of their "principal model[s]". Due to the complexity of his poetic production, Roman authors did not attempt to reproduce Callimachus's poems but creatively reused them in their own work. Vergil, in his Aeneid, an epic about the wanderings of Aeneas, repeatedly alludes to Callimachus when contemplating the nature of his own poetry. Having followed Callimachus's example by rejecting traditional epic poetics in his 6th Eclogue, Vergil labels his Aeneid as a "better work" (Latin: maius opus). Vergil's formulation leaves open whether he sought to write an epic with the refinement called for by Callimachus or whether he had turned his back on Callimacheanism as his career progressed.

Having referred to himself as a "Roman Callimachus" (Latin: Romanus Callimachus), the elegist Propertius follows the example of Callimachus's Aetia by introducing obscure mythological material and numerous recondite details into his erotic history of Rome. At the same time, he challenges Callimachean learnedness by depicting lowbrow details of contemporary nightlife such as strippers and dwarfs kept for entertainment purposes. Ovid described Callimachus as "lacking in genius but strong in art" (Latin: Quamvis ingenio non valet, arte valet). His statement, though seemingly a criticism of the poet, pays homage to Callimachus's belief that technical skill and erudition were the most important attributes of a poet.

=== Modern ===
Title page of an 1862 doctoral dissertation on the life and writings of Callimachus by Max Lincke at the University of Halle-Wittenberg

Classical scholars place Callimachus among the most influential Greek poets. According to Kathryn Gutzwiller, he "reinvented Greek poetry for the Hellenistic age by devising a personal style that came, through its manifestations in Roman poetry, to influence the entire tradition of modern literature". She also writes that his lasting importance is demonstrated by the strong reactions his poetry elicited from contemporaries and posterity. Richard L. Hunter, an expert on Greek literature of the Hellenistic period, states that the selective reception of Callimachus through Roman poets has led to a simplified picture of his poetry. Hunter writes that modern critics have drawn up a false dichotomy between the "content-laden and socially engaged poetry of the archaic and classical periods" and a sophisticated, but meaningless style proposed by Callimachus. Echoing Hunter's assessment in their 2012 book on the reception of Callimachus, the Hellenists Benjamin Acosta-Hughes and Susan Stephens comment that the scarcity of primary evidence and the reliance on Roman accounts has created a label of Callimacheanism that does not accurately represent his literary work.

== Bibliography ==
- Acosta-Hughes, Benjamin (2019). "Callimachus on the Death of a Friend: A Short Study of Callimachean Epigram". In Henriksén, Christer (ed.). A Companion to Ancient Epigram. Hoboken, New Jersey: Wiley. pp. 319–335. doi:10.1002/9781118841709.ch18. ISBN 978-1-118-84170-9. S2CID 192306891.
- Acosta-Hughes, Benjamin; Stephens, Susan (2012). Callimachus in Context: from Plato to the Augustan Poets. Cambridge: Cambridge University Press. ISBN 978-0-511-91999-2.
- Ambühl, Annemarie (2012). "Callimachus". In Wibier, Matthijs (ed.). Brill's New Pauly Supplements I – Volume 5 : The Reception of Classical Literature. Leiden: Brill Publishers. ISBN 978-90-04-21893-2.
- Barchiesi, Alessandro (2011). "Roman Callimachus". In Acosta-Hughes, Benjamis; Lehnus, Luigi; Stephens, Susan (eds.). Brill's Companion to Callimachus. Leiden: Brill Publishers. pp. 511–533. ISBN 978-90-04-21697-6.
- Cameron, Alan (1995). Callimachus and His Critics. Princeton, New Jersey: Princeton University Press. ISBN 978-0-691-04367-8.
- Casson, Lionel (2001). Libraries in the Ancient World. New Haven, Connecticut: Yale University Press. ISBN 978-0-300-09721-4.
- Clayman, Dee (2011). "Berenice and her Lock". Transactions of the American Philological Association. 141 (2): 229–46. doi:10.1353/apa.2011.0013. JSTOR 41289743. S2CID 162367582.
- Fantuzzi, Marco (2006). "Aetiology. I. Greek literature". In Cancik, Hubert; Schneider, Helmuth (eds.). Brill's New Pauly. Leiden: Brill Publishers. ISBN 978-90-04-12259-8.
- Ferguson, John (1980). Callimachus. Boston: Twayne Publishers. ISBN 978-0-8057-6431-4.
- Gutzwiller, Kathryn (2007). Gutzwiller, Kathryn (ed.). A Guide to Hellenistic Literature. Oxford: Blackwell Publishers. doi:10.1002/9780470690185. ISBN 978-0-631-23321-3.
- Gutzwiller, Kathryn (1998). Poetic Garlands: Hellenistic Epigrams in Context. Berkeley, California: University of California Press. ISBN 978-0-520-91897-9.
- Harder, Annette (2012). Callimachus: Aetia. Volume 1. Oxford: Oxford University Press. ISBN 978-0-19-958101-6.
- Hunter, Richard (2012). The Shadow of Callimachus: Studies in the Reception of Hellenistic Poetry at Rome. Cambridge: Cambridge University Press. ISBN 978-0-511-61849-9.
- Hutchinson, Gregory (1997). Hellenistic Poetry. Oxford: Clarendon Press. ISBN 978-0-19-814748-0.
- Parsons, Peter (22 December 2015). "Callimachus (3), of Cyrene, "Battiades," Greek poet and scholar". In Goldberg, Sander (ed.). Callimachus(3). Oxford Classical Dictionary. Oxford: Oxford University Press. doi:10.1093/acrefore/9780199381135.013.1278. ISBN 978-0-19-938113-5.
- Stephens, Susan (2015). Callimachus: The Hymns. New York: Oxford University Press. ISBN 978-0-19-978304-5.
- Witty, Francis (1958). "The Pínakes of Callimachus". The Library Quarterly. 28 (2): 132–136. doi:10.1086/618523. ISSN 0024-2519. JSTOR 4304755. S2CID 147795289.
