= Hecale (Attica) =

Coordinates: 38°08′04″N 23°54′32″E

Hecale or Hekale (Ancient Greek: Ἑκάλη) was a deme of ancient Attica. It was probably near Marathon, since it is said to have obtained its name from a woman, Hecale, who hospitably received Theseus into her house, when he had set out to attack the Marathonian Bull, which was ravaging the Tetrapolis. It contained a sanctuary of Zeus Hecaleius.

The site of Hecale is tentatively located near modern Koukounarti.
