= Rebecca Lämmle =

Swiss Classical scholar

Dr. Rebecca Laemmle
- Occupations: Professor in Classics (Greek Literature) Fellow & Postgraduate Tutor of Pembroke College

Academic background
- Education: University of Basel

Academic work
- Sub-discipline: Ancient Drama, Satyr Play, Homer
- Institutions: University of Cambridge

Rebecca Laemmle (sometimes spelled Lämmle) is a Swiss Classical scholar. She is a Professor of Classics at the University of Cambridge where she is a Fellow of Pembroke College, specializing in Homer and his ancient reception, ancient comedy and tragedy, and comico-satirical writing.

Laemmle holds a PhD in Classics from the University of Basel. She won the Heidelberger Förderpreises für klassisch-philologische Theoriebildung and the Marie Heim-Vögtlin Prize of the Swiss National Science Foundation for her doctoral thesis. She subsequently held a senior lectureship in Greek Literature at Basel, and has also worked at the Albert-Ludwigs-Universität, Freiburg. She was a Visiting Scholar at the University of Cambridge in 2015, and became a full Fellow of Pembroke College in 2016.

At Cambridge, Laemmle has been involved in the production of the Cambridge Greek Play, producing both Oedipus Tyrannus (2019) and The Persians and the Cyclops (2022) at the Cambridge Arts Theatre.

== Selected publications ==
- Lists and Catalogues in Ancient Literature and Beyond, (Berlin/New York, 2021)
- Euripides: Cyclops, (Cambridge, 2020) with Richard Hunter
- Poetik Des Satyrspiels (Poetics of Satyr Plays), (Heidelberg, 2013)
