= Emma Stafford =

Professor of Greek Culture at the University of Leeds

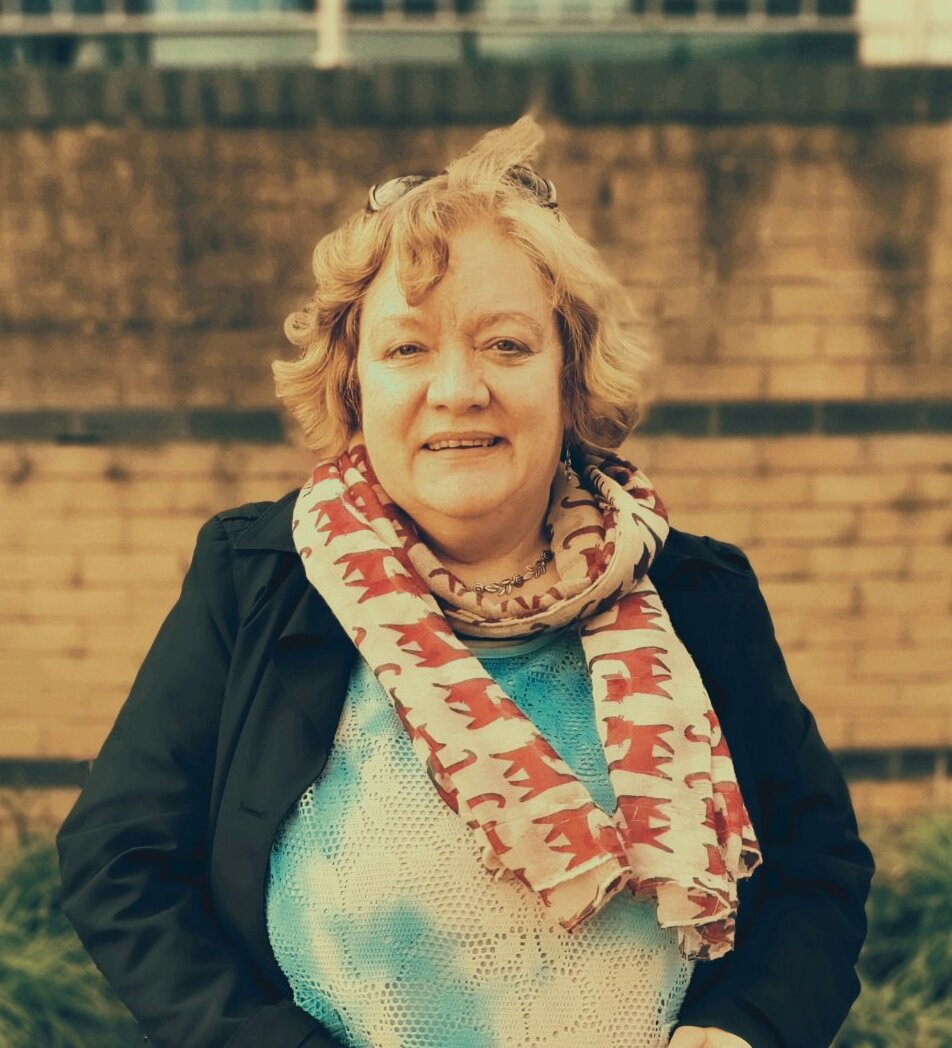
- Professor Stafford in 2022

Academic background
- Education: University of Cambridge, University College London

Academic work
- Discipline: Culture of Greece, Classical reception studies
- Institutions: University of Leeds
- Notable works: Worshipping Virtues: Personification and the Divine in Ancient Greece

Emma Stafford is Professor of Greek Culture at the University of Leeds. Her work focuses on Heracles/Hercules and his reception.

== Education and early career ==
Stafford read classics at New Hall, University of Cambridge (1987–90) and began her PhD at University College London in 1991. Following appointments at Royal Holloway, Birkbeck, the University of Leicester, and the University of Wales, Lampeter, Stafford moved to the University of Leeds in 2000 and became a Senior Lecturer in 2005.

Stafford was appointed Professor of Greek Culture in 2020, becoming the first female professor of Classics at the University of Leeds.

== Work ==
Stafford's work focuses on Greek cultural history and she specialises in myth, allegory, personification, religion, and the reception of Greek culture. She has worked extensively on the myth and reception of Hercules, including numerous publications through research at the University of Leeds, much of which, like Herculean Labours: enriching the public understanding of our classical mythological heritage (2005-2012) has a public engagement dimension.

Building on previous work on Hercules, Stafford now leads the AHRC funded Hercules: a Hero for all Ages project, which aims to chart the significance of the reception of Hercules from the late antique period to modern times. As part of her work, Stafford has spoken widely on the subject including public lectures at Leeds City Museum.

The Hercules Project has extensive public outreach activities, including a new musical drama, Herakles, composed by Tim Benjamin which premiered in Todmorden Town Hall in April 2017. Stafford also coordinated The Labours of Herakles touring exhibition, displayed at Leeds City Museum and the Museum of Classical Archaeology, Cambridge, featuring the work of Marian Maguire.

== Publications ==
- ed. with Alastair Blanshard, The Modern Hercules: Images of the Hero from the Nineteenth to the Early Twenty-First Century (Metaforms: Studies in the Reception of Classical Antiquity 21, Brill, 2020). ISBN 978-90-04-44006-7.
- ed. with Valerie Mainz, The Exemplary Hercules: from the Renaissance to the Enlightenment and Beyond (Metaforms: Studies in the Reception of Classical Antiquity 20, Brill, 2020)
- ed. with Arlene Allan and Eva Anagnostou-Laoutides E, Herakles Inside and Outside the Church From the First Apologists to the End of the Quattrocento (Metaforms: Studies in the Reception of Classical Antiquity 18, Brill, 2020)
- Herakles, Gods and Heroes in the Ancient World (Routledge, 2012)
- ed. with Herrin JE, Personification in the Greek World: from Antiquity to Byzantium, Centre for Hellenic Studies King's College London Publications 7 (Ashgate, 2005)
- Ancient Greece: life, myth and art (Duncan Baird, 2004)
- Worshipping Virtues: personification and the divine in ancient Greece (Classical Press of Wales and Duckworth, 2000)
