= Cretan Bull =

Creature in Greek mythology

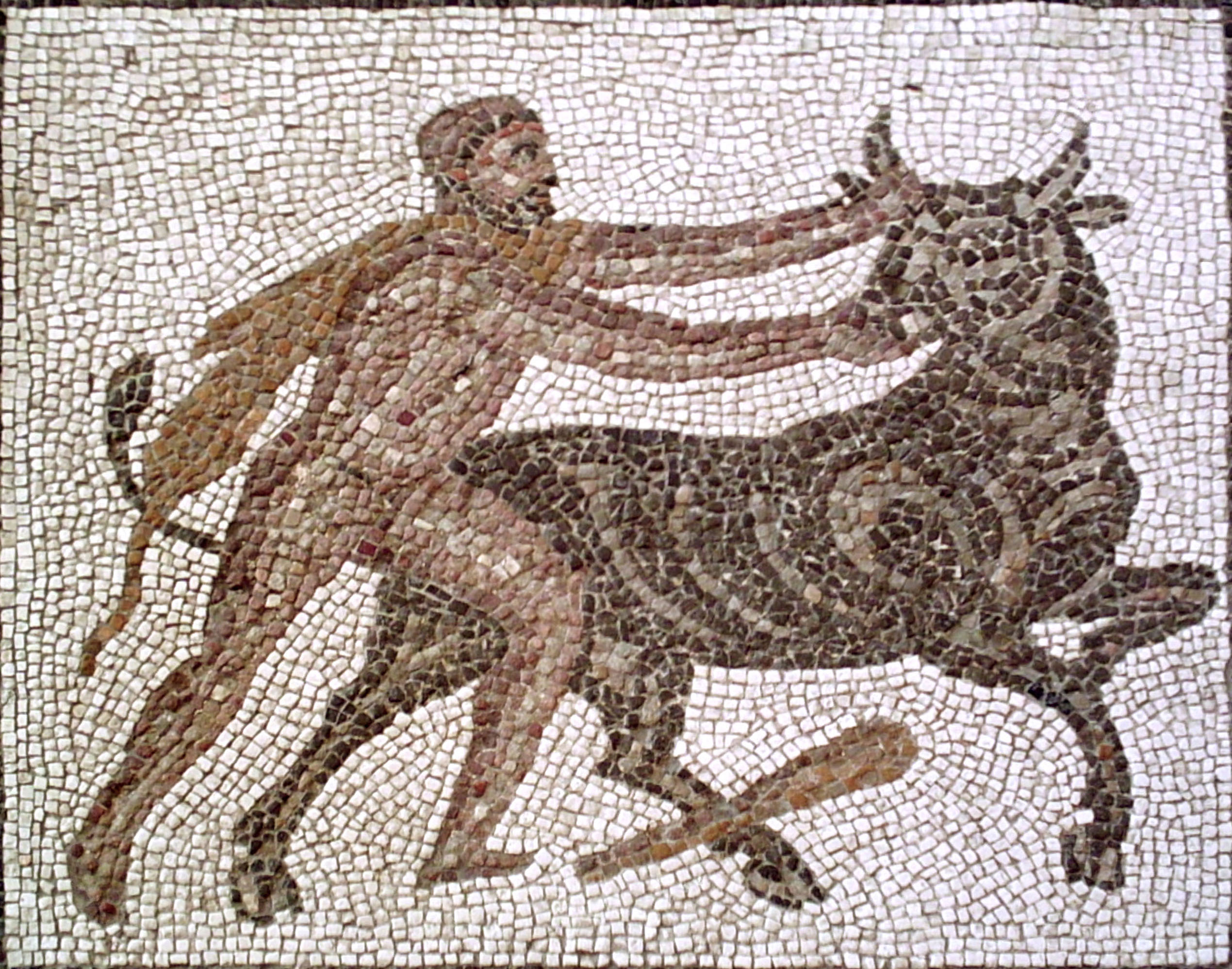
- Heracles capturing the Cretan Bull. Detail of a Roman mosaic from Llíria (Spain).

Creature information
- Grouping: Legendary creature

Origin
- Country: Greece
- Region: Crete

In Greek mythology, the Cretan Bull (Ancient Greek: Κρὴς ταῦρος, romanized: Krḕs taûros) was the bull with whom Pasiphaë fell in love and conceived the Minotaur.

== Mythology ==
=== Background ===
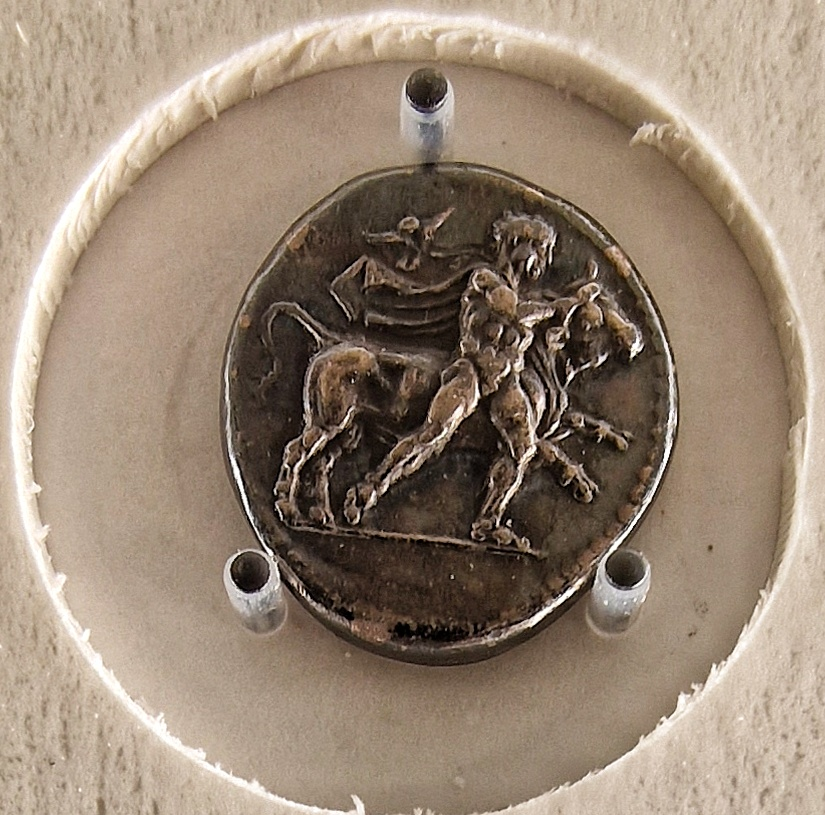
Ancient drachma from Larissa, around 420 BC, depicting Heracles with the Cretan Bull. Now in the Palais de Rumine, Lausanne, Switzerland

Minos was king in Crete. In order to confirm his right to rule, rather than any of his brothers, he prayed that Poseidon send him a snow-white bull as a sign. Poseidon sent Minos the bull, with the understanding that the bull would be sacrificed to the god. Deciding that Poseidon's bull was too fine of a specimen to kill, Minos sent the bull to his herds and substituted another, inferior bull for sacrifice. Enraged, Poseidon had Aphrodite curse Pasiphaë, the wife of Minos, causing her to fall in love with the bull. She subsequently gave birth to the half-man, half-bull, Minotaur. Poseidon passed on his rage to the bull, causing him to lay waste to the land.

After consulting the oracle at Delphi, Minos had Daedalus construct the Labyrinth to hold the Minotaur.

=== The seventh labour of Heracles ===
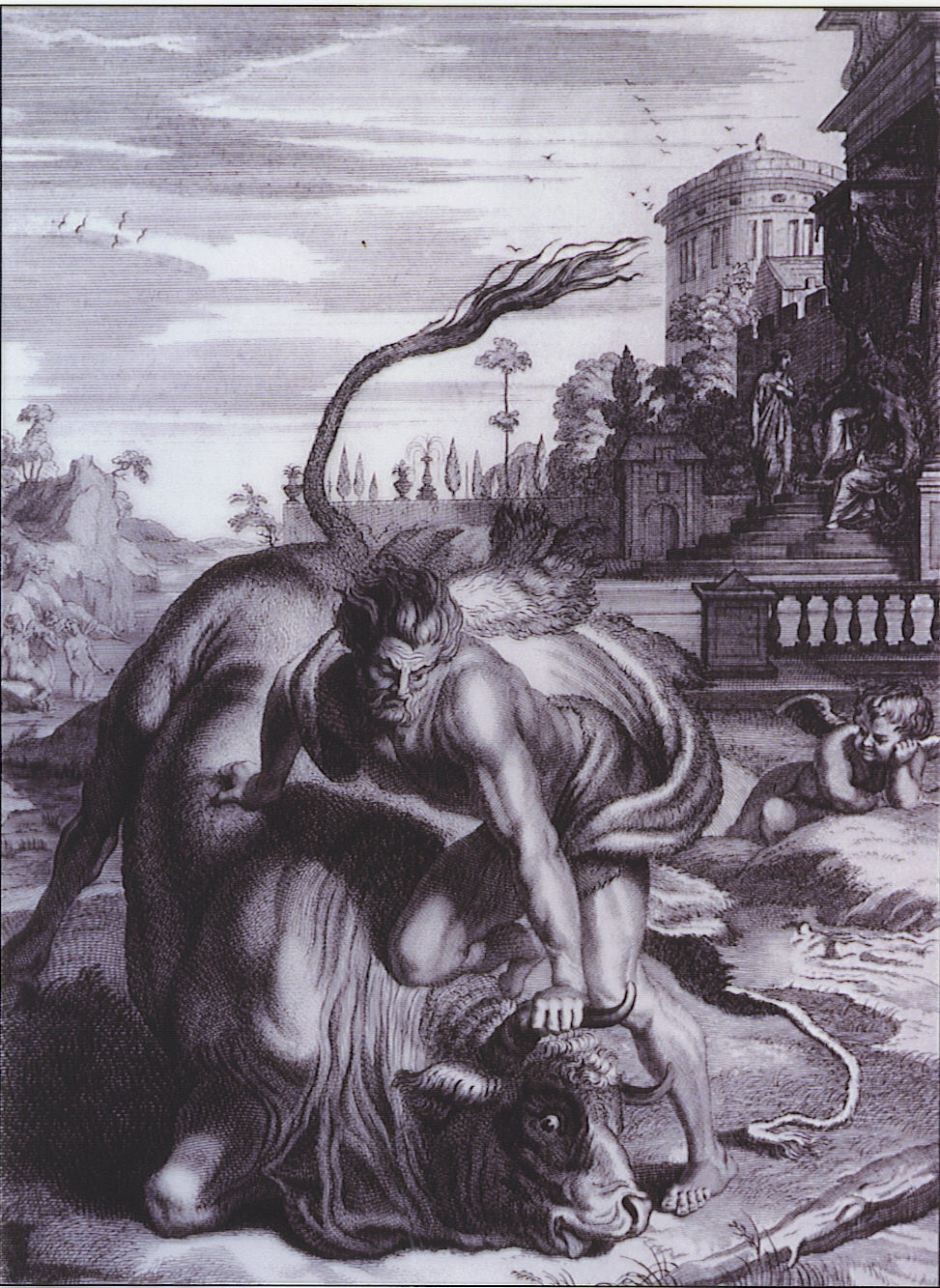
Heracles performing one of his labors as he forces the Cretan Bull to the ground. The engraving was created by B. Picart in 1731.

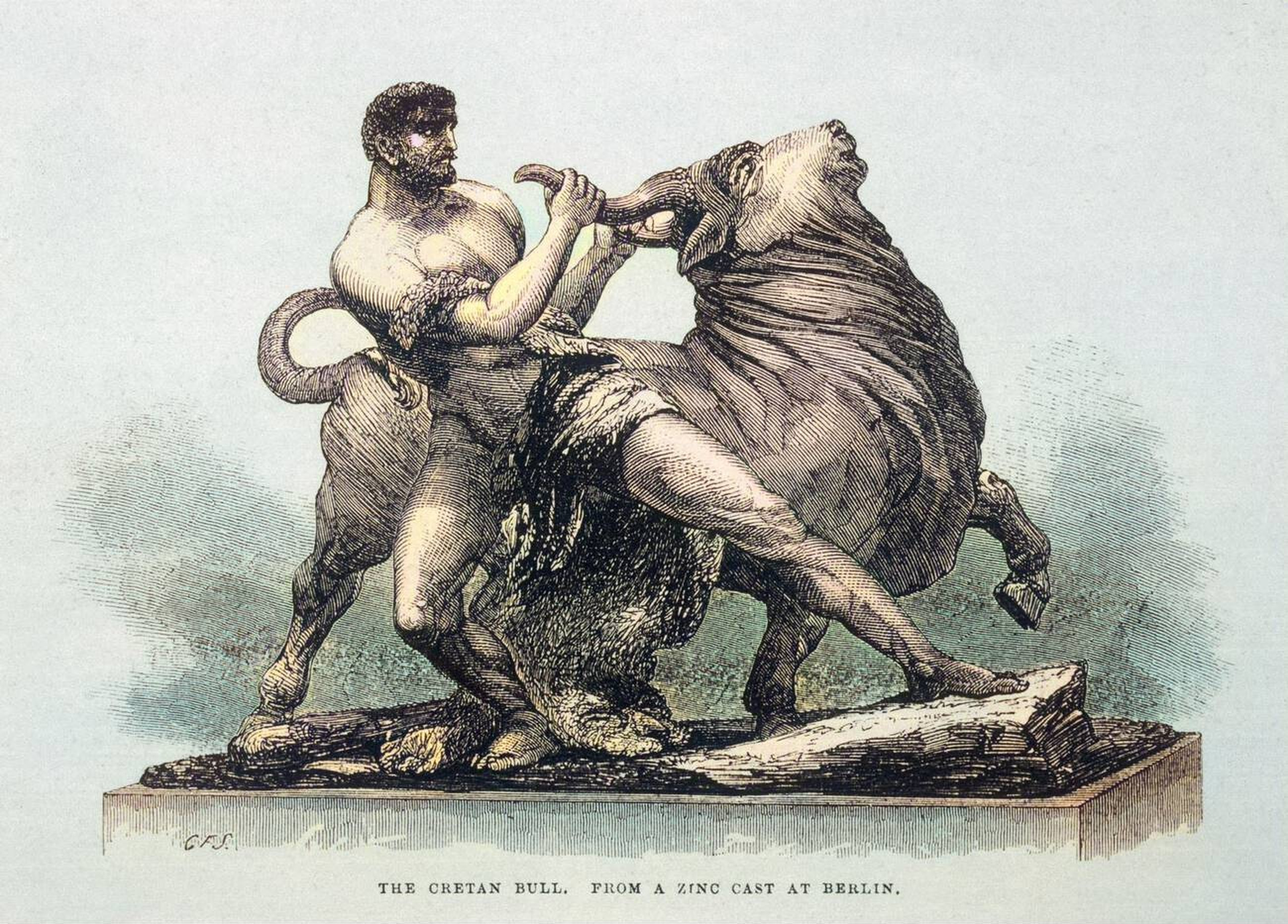
Hercules capturing the Cretan Bull, engraving by John Cassell in his Works of Eminent Masters in Painting, Sculpture, Architecture and Decorative Art, 1854.

Heracles was sent to capture the bull by Eurystheus as his seventh task. He sailed to Crete, whereupon Minos gave Heracles permission to take the bull away as he had been wreaking havoc on Crete by uprooting crops and leveling orchard walls. Heracles captured the bull, and then shipped him to Eurystheus in Tiryns. The bull later broke loose and wandered into Marathon, becoming known as the "Marathonian Bull". Eurystheus then sent Heracles to bring back the man-eating Mares of Diomedes (the next task).

=== Capture by Theseus ===
Androgeus, a son of Minos and Pasiphaë, competed in the games held by Aegeus, King of Athens. He won all the games, but the bull, which broke free from his pen, rampaged through the city and trampled Androgeus. Devastated, Minos went to war with Athens and won. As punishment, the Athenians had to send several youths every 9 years to be devoured by the Minotaur.

Theseus set out to try to capture the bull. On the way to Marathon, Theseus sought shelter from a storm in the shack owned by an old lady named Hecale. She swore to make a sacrifice to Zeus if Theseus was successful in capturing the bull. Theseus did capture the bull, but when he returned to Hecale's hut, she was dead. Theseus built a deme in her honour. He then dragged the bull to Athens where he sacrificed him to Athena and/or Apollo. Theseus then went to Crete where he killed the Minotaur with the help of Minos' daughter Ariadne.

== Origin ==
According to Jeremy McInerney, the iconography of the bull permeates Minoan culture. The cult of the bull was also prominent in southwestern Anatolia. Bernard Clive Dietrich notes that the most important animal in the Neolithic shrines at Çatalhöyük was the bull. The bull was a chthonic animal associated with fertility and vegetation. It figured in cave cults connected with rites for the dead.

The palace at Knossos displays a number of murals depicting young men and women vaulting over a bull. While scholars are divided as to whether or not this reflects an actual practice, Barry B. Powell suggests it may have contributed to the story of the young Athenians sent to the Minotaur. McInerney observes that the story of Pasiphaë and the Cretan Bull was not written until after Crete had come under Greek control. Emma Stafford notes that the story of the Cretan Bull does not appear before the Hellenistic period and suggests the connection between Crete and Athens is the result of the development of the myth of the Theseus cycle in late sixth century Athens.

== In popular culture ==
- Taurus is one of the oldest observed constellations, and has been variously connected with the abduction of Europa, the seduction of Io, and the Cretan Bull. The Taurid meteor shower is named after the radiant point in the constellation Taurus, from where they are seen to come. Occurring in late October and early November, they are sometimes called "Halloween fireballs".
- Charles Bertram Lewis sees the episode of the Monstrous Herdsman in Chrétien de Troyes's Yvain, the Knight of the Lion, essentially a re-telling of the story of "Theseus and the Minotaur".

== See also ==
- Bull (mythology)
- Donn Cuailnge, the Brown Bull of Cooley
- Kao (bull)
- Minotaur
