= Richard L. Hunter =

Australian classicist (born 1953)

Richard L. Hunter FBA
- Born: Richard Lawrence Hunter; 30 October 1953 (age 72)
- Citizenship: Australia

Academic background
- Education: University of Sydney; University of Cambridge
- Thesis: A commentary on Euboulos (1979)
- Doctoral advisor: C. F. L. Austin

Academic work
- Discipline: Classical studies
- Sub-discipline: Ancient Greek literature; literary criticism; Hellenistic poetry; Roman poetry; Ancient Greek religion
- Institutions: University of Cambridge; Pembroke College, Cambridge; Trinity College, Cambridge

Richard Lawrence Hunter FBA (born 30 October 1953) is an Australian classical scholar. From 2001 to 2021, he was the 37th Regius Professor of Greek at the University of Cambridge.

== Early life and education ==
Hunter was born on 30 October 1953. He grew up in Australia, and was educated at Cranbrook School, an independent school in Sydney. He studied at the University of Sydney, graduating with a Bachelor of Arts (BA Hons) degree in 1974. He then moved to England, where he studied for a Doctor of Philosophy (PhD) degree at the University of Cambridge; he was a member of Pembroke College, Cambridge. His doctoral thesis was titled "A commentary on Euboulos", and his PhD was awarded in 1979.

== Academic career ==
After completing his PhD, Hunter became a lecturer at the University of Cambridge and a Fellow of Pembroke College, Cambridge. In 2001 he was appointed as the Regius Professor of Greek at Cambridge in succession to P. E. Easterling and became a Fellow of Trinity College, Cambridge. He retired as Regius Professor in October 2021, giving his valedictory lecture on 27 September 2021.

Hunter is a member of the Academy of Athens, an Honorary Fellow of the University of Sydney and has an honorary degree from the Aristotle University of Thessaloniki. He serves on the advisory board of the periodical Materiali e discussioni per l'analisi dei testi classici. Since 2013, he is president of the council of Aristotle University of Thessaloniki.

In 2013, Hunter was elected a Fellow of the British Academy.

== Publications ==
- Eubulus: The Fragments. Cambridge: Cambridge University Press. 1983 – via Internet Archive.
- A Study of Daphnis & Chloe (Cambridge, 1983)
- The New Comedy of Greece and Rome (Cambridge, 1985)
- Apollonius of Rhodes: Argonautica Book III (Cambridge, 1989)
- The 'Argonautica' of Apollonius: literary studies (Cambridge, 1993)
- Theocritus and the Archaeology of Greek Poetry (Cambridge, 1996)
- Studies in Heliodorus (Cambridge, 1998)
- Theocritus. A Selection (Cambridge, 1999)
- Theocritus: Encomium of Ptolemy Philadelphus (Berkeley, 2003)
- Plato's Symposium (Oxford, 2004)
- Tradition and Innovation in Hellenistic Poetry (with M. Fantuzzi) (Cambridge, 2004)
- The Hesiodic Catalogue of Women: Constructions and Reconstructions (Cambridge, 2005)
- The Shadow of Callimachus (Cambridge, 2006)
- On Coming After: Studies in Post-Classical Greek Literature and its Reception (Berlin, 2008)
- Wandering Poets in Ancient Greek Culture (with I. Rutherford) (Cambridge, 2009)
- Critical Moments in Classical Literature (Cambridge, 2009)
- Plutarch, How to study poetry (with D. Russell) (Cambridge, 2011)
- Plato and the Traditions of Ancient Literature: the silent stream (Cambridge, 2012)
- Hesiodic Voices. Studies in the Ancient Reception of Hesiod's Works and Days (Cambridge, 2014)
- Dionysius of Halicarnassus and Augustan Rome (ed.; with Casper C. de Jonge) (Cambridge, 2018)
- The Layers of the Text: Collected Papers on Classical Literature 2008–2021 (Berlin, 2023)
- Euripides: Cyclops (with R. Laemmle) (Cambridge, 2021)

Academic offices
| Preceded by P. E. Easterling | Regius Professor of Greek, Cambridge University; 2001–2021 | Succeeded by Tim Whitmarsh |
