= Kathryn Gutzwiller =

American classicist

Kathryn J. Gutzwiller is a professor of classics at the University of Cincinnati. She specialises in Hellenistic poetry, and her interests include Greek and Latin poetry, ancient gender studies, literary theory, and the interaction between text and image. Her contribution to Hellenistic epigram and pastoral poetry has been considered particularly influential.

== Career ==
Gutzwiller was awarded her PhD in classics by the University of Wisconsin-Madison (1977). She has served as a director of the American Philological Association (APA) and as monograph editor of the APA's American Classics Series. Gutzwiller is awarded numerous grants, including a National Endowment for the Humanities (NEH), a Fellowship at All Souls College, Oxford, a Fellowship to the Institute for Advanced Study, Princeton, an American Council of Learned Societies (ACLS) Fellowship, and a Loeb Classical Foundation Grant. In 2001, she received the Charles J. Goodwin Award of Merit from the American Philological Association for Poetic Garlands, has twice won the Gildersleeve Award for the best article in the American Journal of Philology. In 2002, she was awarded the Rieveschl Award for scholarly excellence at the University of Cincinnati. She is now working towards an edition and commentary on the epigrams by Meleager of Gadara, to be published by Oxford University Press.

== Selected publications ==
=== Books ===
- (2005) The New Posidippus: A Hellenistic Poetry Book, edited by K. Gutzwiller. Oxford: Oxford University Press.
- (2008) Revised paperback edition.
- (1981) Studies in the Hellenistic Epyllion, in Beiträge zur klassischen Philologie, Heft 114. Meisenheim am Glan.
- (2007) A Guide to Hellenistic Literature. Oxford: Blackwell Publishing.
- (1998) Poetic Garlands: Hellenistic Epigrams in Context. Berkeley: University of California Press.
- (1991) Theocritus' Pastoral Analogies: The Formation of a Genre. Madison: University of Wisconsin Press.

=== Articles and contributions to volumes ===
- (2012) “All in the Family: Forgiveness and Reconciliation in New Comedy,” in Ancient Forgiveness: Classical, Judaic, Christian, edited by Charles Griswold and David Konstan (Cambridge: Cambridge University Press), pp. 48–75.
- (2011) "Apelles and the Painting of Language," Revue de Philologie 83 (2009, published 2011) 39–63.
- (2010) "Images poétiques et reminiscences artistiques dans les épigrammes de Méléagre," translated from English by Évelyne Prioux, in Métamorphoses du regard ancient, edited by Évelyne Prioux and Agnès Rouveret (Paris), pp. 67–112.
- (2010) “Literary Criticism,” in A Companion to Hellenistic Literature, edited by James J. Clauss and Martine Cuipers (Malden, MA, Oxford, and Chicester: Wiley-Blackwell), pp. 337–65.
- (2007) "The Paradox of Amatory Epigram," in Brill's Companion to Hellenistic Epigram, edited by Peter Bing and Jon Bruss (Leiden: Brill), pp. 313–32.
- (2006). "The Herdsman in Greek Thought," in Brill's Companion to Greek and Latin Pastoral, edited by Marco Fantuzzi and Theodore Papanghelis (Leiden/Boston: Brill), pp. 1–23.
- (2006). "The Bucolic Problem," Classical Philology 101: 380–404.
- (2006) "Learning and Love in the Epigrams of Meleager," in Syncharmata: Studies in Honour of Jan Fredrik Kindstrand, edited by Sten Eklund. Acta Universitatis Upsaliensis, Studia Graeca Upsaliensia 21., (Uppsala: Uppsala Universitet), pp. 67–85.
- (2004) "Gender and Inscribed Epigram: Herennia Procula and the Thespian Eros," Transactions of the American Philological Association 134: 383–418.
- (2003). "Visual Aesthetics in Meleager and Cavafy." Classical and Modern Literature 32: 67-87
