= Appendix Vergiliana =

Collection of poems written by Virgil

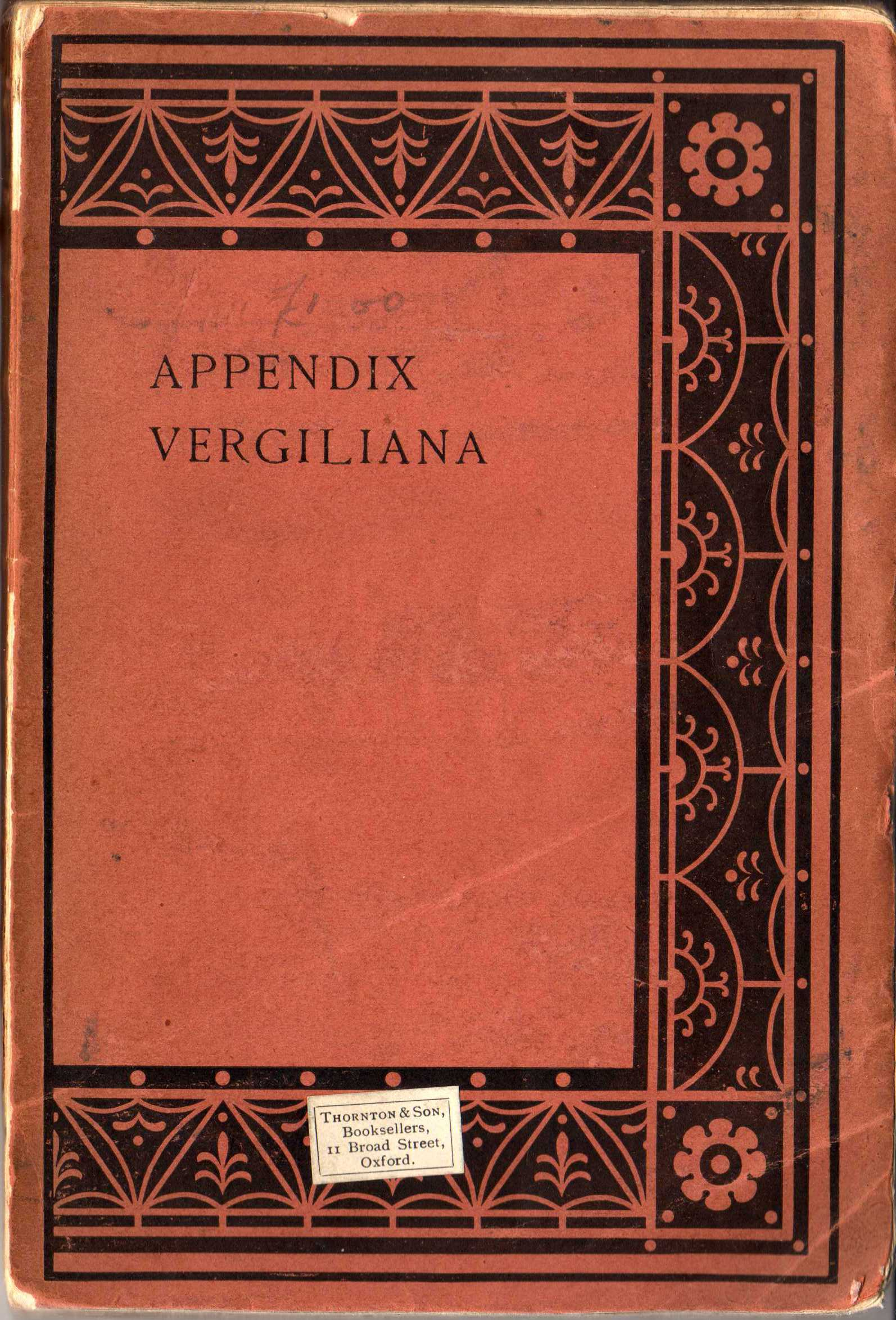
Cover of a 1927 edition of the Appendix

The Appendix Vergiliana is a collection of Latin poems traditionally ascribed as being the juvenilia (work written as a youth) of Virgil (70–19 BC).

Many of the poems in the Appendix were considered works by Virgil in antiquity. However, recent studies suggest that the Appendix contains a diverse collection of minor poems by various authors from the 1st century AD.

Scholars are almost unanimous in considering the works of the Appendix spurious, primarily on grounds of style, metrics, and vocabulary.

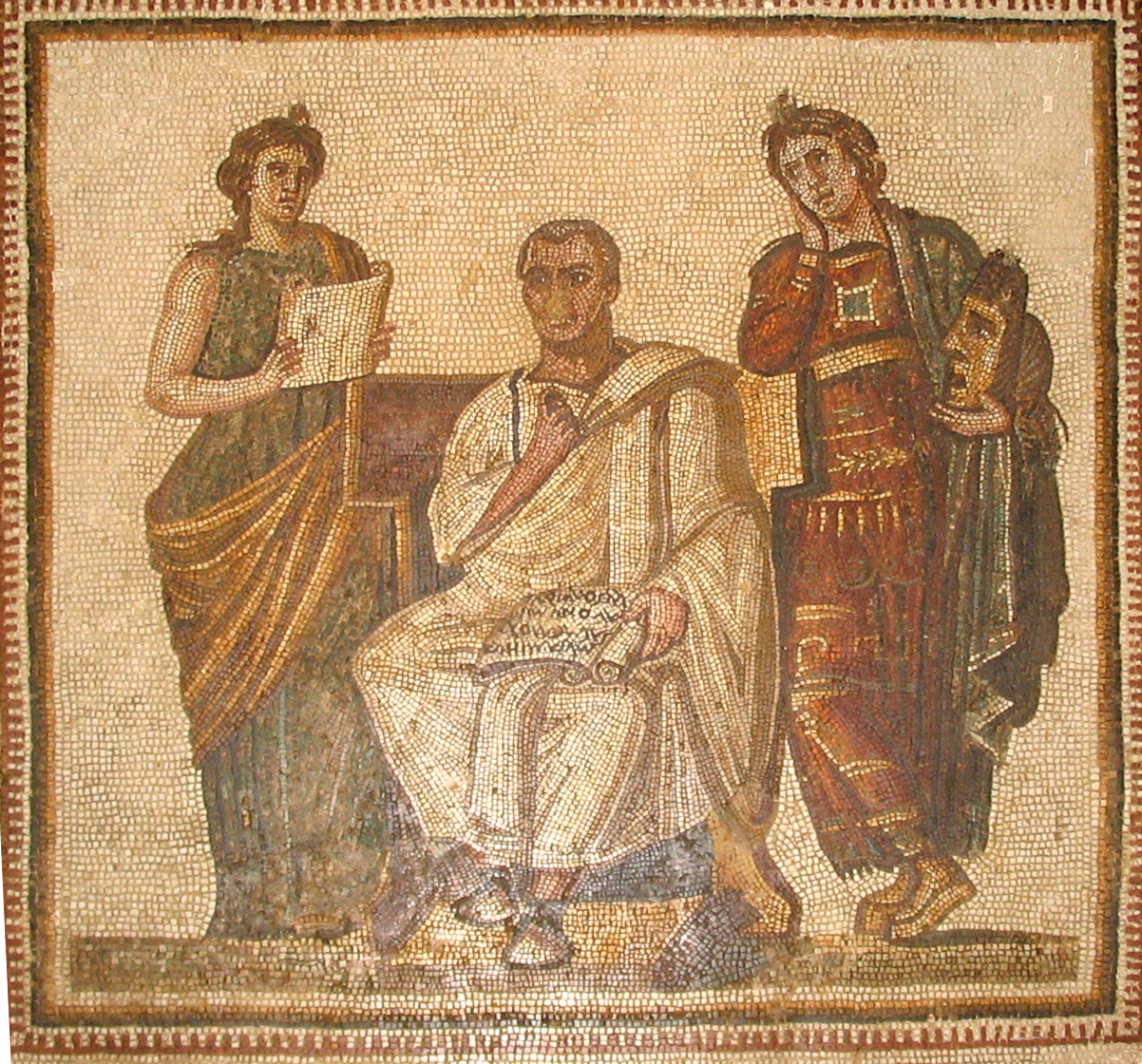
A mosaic of Virgil and two Muses. The mosaic, which dates from the 3rd century AD, was discovered in the Hadrumetum in Sousse, Tunisia and is now on display in the Bardo Museum in Tunis, Tunisia.

== Authorship ==
Besides the Eclogues, the Georgics, and the Aeneid, a collection of minor works attributed to Virgil certainly existed by the reign of Nero. These poems were not included in the edition of Virgil's works published after his death by Varius Rufus and Plotius Tucca and are not found in any of the major Virgilian codices, nor is there any allusion to them in the vita prefixed to the 1st century commentary of Valerius Probus. The vita which preceded the 4th century commentary of Donatus, which is generally supposed to be heavily dependent on the 2nd century Suetonius, enumerated the Catalepton, Priapea, Epigrammata, Dirae, Ciris, and Culex as early works of Virgil; yet as two 15th-century manuscripts omit the Catalepton and Ciris, but insert the Moretum, Henry Nettleship suspects that Suetonius referred only to the Culex, of which he goes on to give a brief account, and the rest of the list is interpolated. Suetonius adds, however, that "he also wrote the Aetna, about which there is some controversy." The phrase "about which there is some controversy" is lacking in some manuscripts, and believed by some critics to be interpolated. The life given by Servius contains the statement, "he also wrote these seven or eight books: Ciris, Aetna, Culex, Priapea, Catalepton, Epigrammata, Copa, Dirae."

The Culex is quoted as Virgilian by Statius and Martial, and in Suetonius' Life of Lucan. Quintilian quotes Catalepton 2 as the work of Virgil. The Elegiae in Maecenatem cannot possibly be by Virgil, as Maecenas died eleven years after Virgil in 8 BC. The poems are all probably by different authors, except for the Lydia and Dirae which may have a common author, and have been given various, nebulous dates within the 1st century AD. The Culex and the Ciris are thought to have been composed under the emperor Tiberius. Some of the poems may be attempts to pass works off under Virgil's name as pseudepigraphia, such as the Catalepton, while others seem to be independent works that were subsumed into the collection like the Ciris which is influenced more by the late Republican neoterics than Virgil.

Emil Baehrens theorized that the poems of the Appendix already constituted a single collection in antiquity. This theory is generally rejected by modern scholars, and there is no evidence of a collected edition of the poems prior to an entry in a mid-9th century catalogue of the library at Murbach Abbey, which lists under Virgil the following item: "Dire; Ciris; Culex; Catalapeion; Ethne; Priapeia; Copa; Moretum; Mecenas." Some manuscripts containing these poems also include three 4th century compositions, De viro bono, Est et non, and De rosis nascentibus, of which the first two certainly, and the third probably, were written by Ausonius. It has become conventional to refer to the poems collectively as the Appendix Vergiliana since the 1573 edition of Joseph Scaliger.

Charles de la Rue, S.J., suggested that although Virgil had indeed written a poem called the Culex, it had been lost at an early date, and a writer of a later era had composed the Culex which we now possess as a fictitious replacement of it; he likewise judged the Ciris to be the work of an author later than the time of Ovid. François Oudin, S.J., made the first serious attempt to prove the spuriousness of the Culex in 1729. Oudin was the first to draw attention to the seeming discrepancy between the extant poem and the abstract of Virgil's Culex given by Suetonius.

Though the authenticity of the Appendix was once generally accepted, 19th-century criticism judged these works unworthy of Virgil, and therefore spurious; Alfred Gudeman expressed the general verdict of the age when he wrote that "their spuriousness is established by incontrovertible proofs." Controversy over the date and authorship of these poems was revived by Franz Skutsch, who argued in his work Aus Vergils Frühzeit (1901) that parallels between the Aeneid and the Ciris demonstrate the influence of the Ciris upon the Aeneid and not the reverse, and that the Ciris is a work of Virgil's friend Cornelius Gallus. The discussion is ongoing.

== Contents ==
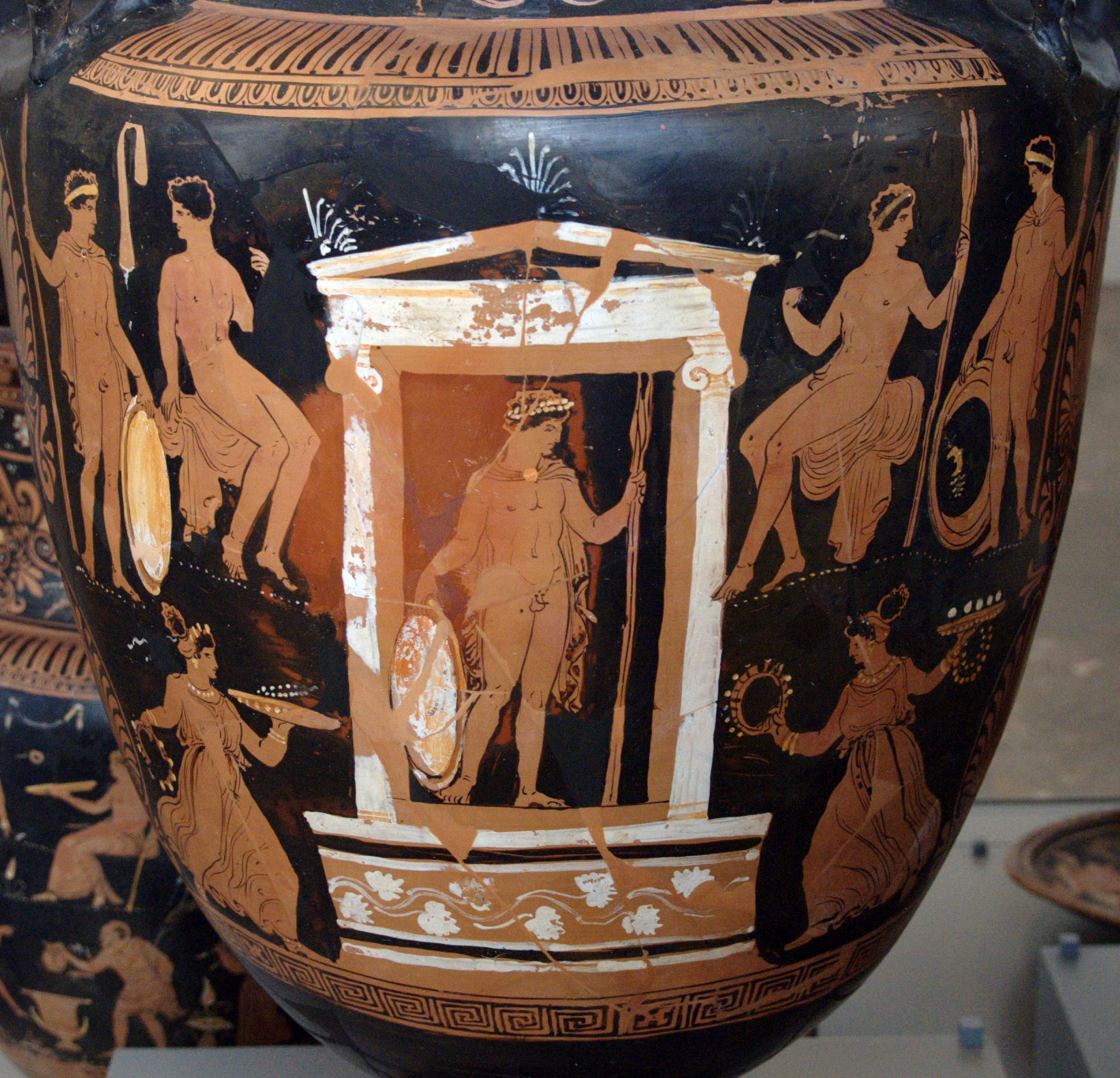
The Naiskos crater from Berlin showing scenes of the underworld.

=== Culex ("The Gnat") ===
This is a pastoral epyllion in 414 hexameters which evokes the world of Theocritus and employs epic conventions for comic effect in a parody. The poem opens with an address to the young Octavian, a promise of more poems, an invocation of Apollo, and a prayer for Octavian's success. The poet has a priamel in which he rejects the Battle of the Gods and Giants and historical epic. It is noon, and a poor but happy shepherd, who lacks the refinements of classical luxury, is tending his flocks when he sees a grove of trees, a locus amoenus, and lies down to rest. The mythical metamorphoses of the trees in the grove are described. As he sleeps, a snake approaches him and is ready to bite when a gnat lands on his eyes. Reflexively killing the gnat he awakes, sees the snake and kills it. That night, the gnat appears to the shepherd in a dream, laments its undeserved fate, and gives a long description of the underworld and the souls of the dead mythological heroes there, allowing it to digress. The gnat especially focuses on the story of Eurydice and the Trojan War. The gnat goes on to describe famous Roman heroes and then his audience before Minos to decide his fate. When he awakes, the shepherd constructs a heroön (shrine) to the gnat in the grove and the poet has a flower-catalogue. The shepherd inscribes it with the inscription "Little gnat, to you deservedly the guard of the flock repays his funeral duty for your gift of life."

The Culex cannot be one of Virgil's juvenilia because it alludes to the full body of his work; thus, it is usually dated to sometime during the reign of Tiberius. However, Suetonius in his Lives of the Poets (18) writes, "the Culex... of his (Virgil's) was written when he might have been sixteen years old", so it is possible that the extant version which has come down to us may be a later copy that had been modified. The poem has been variously interpreted as a charming epyllion or as an elaborate allegory in which the shepherd symbolizes Augustus and the gnat Marcellus.

Recent graphometric analysis by Stephan Vonfelt supports Virgilian authorship. Glenn Most writes, "the problem of the authenticity of the Culex, like the corpse of its heroic flea, simply will not die. It returns to complain of ill-treatment and to haunt those who thought they had killed it."

=== Ciris ===
The Ciris is an epyllion in 541 hexameters describing the myth of Nisus, the king of Megara and his daughter Scylla of Megara. The epyllion was a popular style of composition which seems to have developed in the Hellenistic age; surviving examples can be found in Theocritus and Catullus. The poet begins his hundred line prologue by invoking the Muses and Sophia, despite the fact that he is an Epicurean, and describes his poem as a gift to Messalla like the robe given to Minerva in the Panathenaia. The poet differentiates the Scylla of his poem from the sea-monster Scylla and describes the monster's birth and metamorphosis. He starts by describing Minos' siege of Megara and the lock of purple hair on the head of Nisus which protected the city. While playing ball, Scylla is shot by Cupid and falls madly in love with Minos. As a prize for Minos, she tries to cut the lock of her father, but her nurse, Carme, asks Scylla why she is upset. After Scylla tells her she is in love with Minos, Carme says that Minos earlier had killed her daughter Britomartis and convinces Scylla to go to bed. In the morning, Scylla tries to talk Nisus into making peace with Minos, and the nurse brews a magical potion, but nothing works and Scylla cuts off the lock. The city falls and Scylla, lamenting Minos' refusal to marry her, is taken prisoner on the Cretan ships which sail around Attica. The pitying Amphitrite transforms Scylla into a bird, the ciris, while Jupiter transforms Nisus into a sea-eagle, which pursues the ciris as Scorpio pursues Orion.

The poet's description of himself as a retired politician now dedicated to philosophy excludes Virgil's authorship. He appears to have imitated all three canonical Virgilian works, as well as Ovid and Manilius, but a date later than Messalla's death (no later than early AD 13) creates a problem identifying the poet's addressee. A Tiberian date seems likely for its composition, probably roughly contemporary with Ovid's Metamorphoses.

=== Copa ("The Barmaid") ===
This poem in 38 elegiac couplets describes the song of a Syrian barmaid (or tavern-keeper). She describes a lush, pastoral setting and a picnic laid out in the grass and invites an unnamed man to spend time with her, stop thinking about the future, and live for the present.

=== Moretum ("The Pesto") ===
The Moretum in 124 hexameter lines describes the preparation by the poor farmer Simylus of a meal. The poem is in the tradition of Hellenistic poetry about the poor and their diet and has a precedent in Callimachus' Hecale and poems that describe theoxeny. Waking before dawn, he starts the fire, grinds grain as he sings and talks to his African slave Scybale, and starts baking. His garden and its products are described. Simylus fashions from garlic, cheese, and herbs the moretum, a type of pesto, eats, and goes out to plow. The poem is notable for its use of the phrase "e pluribus unus".

=== Dirae ("Curses") ===
This poem in 103 hexameter lines is a series of curses by a dispossessed farmer on the veteran who has usurped his land. The tradition of curse poetry goes back to the works of Archilochus and Hipponax. The poem may have connections to the Hellenistic Arae of Euphorion of Chalcis, but it is also very much in the pastoral tradition of Theocritus and the Eclogues. The poem opens pastorally by addressing Battarus, a friend whose farm has also been confiscated and describing the actions of the soldier called Lycurgus. First the speaker curses the plants on the farm with bareness and then asks the forests to burn before Lycurgus destroys them with his axe. He then prays to Neptune for a flood to destroy the farm and for the land to turn into a swamp. The poem ends with a farewell to his farm and his lover, Lydia.

=== Lydia ===
This hexameter lament in 80 lines was connected to the Dirae because of the mention of Lydia in that poem but is probably an independent piece. It also has a pastoral setting and is in the tradition of Theocritus' amatory idylls and Latin love elegy. It begins with the poet saying he envies the countryside which a woman named Lydia inhabits and describes his pain at his separation from her. He looks to the animal world and the astronomical world with their amorous pairings and feels despair at the passing of the golden age. He describes the love of Jupiter and Juno, Venus and Adonis, and Aurora. He ends with the impossible wish to have been born in a better age.

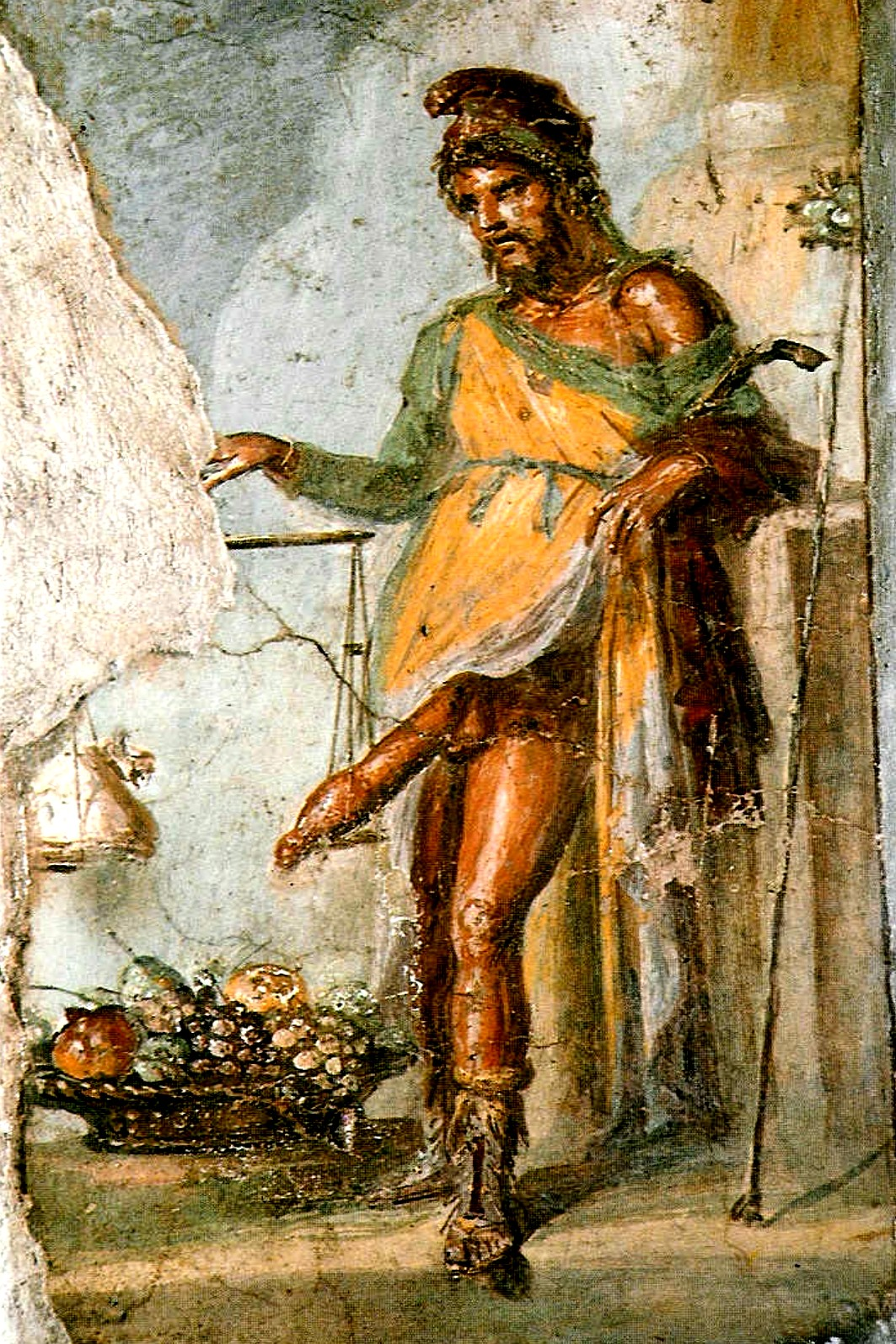
A painting of Priapus from the House of the Vettii in Pompeii.

=== Priapea ("Priapus Poems") ===
This is a collection of three poems, each in a different meter, with the god Priapus as the speaker. Priapea are a traditional subgenre of Greek poetry and are primarily found in Greek epigrams. A notable piece of Priapic poetry can be found in Theocritus 13 and Roman examples can be found in Horace and Tibullus as well as the 80 epigrams of the Carmina Priapea. The first poem in two elegiac couplets is a mock-inscription in which the god describes the setting of his statue at different seasons and his dislike of winter and fear of being made into firewood. The second poem is in 21 iambic trimeters. Priapus addresses a passer-by, describes how he protects and nourishes the farm through the seasons, and demands respect, as his wooden phallus can double as a club. The third poem is composed of 21 lines in Priapean metre (– x – u u – u – | – x – u u – x). In it, the Priapus statue addresses a group of boys who want to rob the farm. He describes his protection of the farm and the worship the owners give it. He ends by telling the boys to rob a neighbor's farm whose Priapus is careless.

=== Catalepton ("Trifles") ===
The Catalepton is a collection of fifteen or sixteen poems in various meters. The first elegiac poem is addressed to Tucca and describes the poet's separation from his lover. The second makes fun of a fellow writer for his obsession with Attic dialect. The third elegiac piece is a description of a successful general – possibly Pompey the Great – who fell from power. Poem 4 in elegiacs is on the poet's friendship and admiration for Octavius Musa. Poem 5 describes a poet's giving up of rhetorical study to learn philosophy with Siro. The elegiac sixth poem criticizes Noctuinus and his father-in-law for some scandal with a girl. Poem 7 in elegiacs talks about love and plays with Greek words in Latin poetry. The eighth elegiac poem addresses the farm of Siro as being dear to the poet as his Mantuan and Cremonan estates. Poem 9 is a long elegiac piece which is an encomium to Messalla describing the poet's pastoral poetry, praising Messalla's wife, Sulpicia, and recounting his military achievements. Poem 10 is a parody of Catullus 4 and describes the career of the old muleteer Sabinus. The elegiac poem 11 is a mock lament for the drunken Octavius Musa. Poem 12 makes fun of Noctuinus for his two lovers. Poem 13 is in iambics and attacks a certain Lucienus or Luccius for his love affairs and seedy living. Poem 13a is an elegiac epitaph on an unknown scholar. Poem 14 is an elegiac prayer to Venus to help him complete the Aeneid and a promise to pay his vows to her. The final poem is an elegiac epigram for Virgil's tomb signed by Varius. Scholarly support for a Virgilian authorship of the Catalepton remains significant.

=== Elegiae in Maecenatem ("Elegies for Maecenas") ===
The Elegiae are two poems on the death of Gaius Maecenas (died 8 BC) in elegiac couplets whose ascription to Virgil (who died eleven years earlier) is impossible. It has been conjectured by Scaliger that they are the work of an Albinovanus Pedo, who is also responsible for the Consolatio ad Liviam. They were formerly transmitted as one long poem. The first poem opens with the author saying he has just written a lament for a young man, perhaps Drusus who died in 9 BC aged twenty-nine. The poet describes his first meeting with Maecenas introduced by Lollius, praises his art, and defends his wearing of loose clothes (criticized later by Seneca). Maecenas' life spent on culture rather than war is praised, as is his service at Actium; a long mythological section compares Maecenas to Bacchus and describes the labors of Hercules and his service to Omphale. The death is compared to the loss of Hesperus and Tithonus and ends with a prayer that the earth rest lightly on him. The second poem was separated by Scaliger and is far shorter, encompassing the dying words of Maecenas. First he wishes he had died before Drusus and then prays that he be remembered, that the Romans remain loyal to Augustus, that he have an heir, and that Augustus be divinized by Venus.

== Bibliography ==
Overviews

- Baehrens, Emil, ed. (1880). "Appendix Vergiliana". Poetae latini minores. Vol. II. Leipzig: B. G. Teubner.
- Bramble, J. C. (1982). "The Age of Augustus: Minor figures". Cambridge History of Classical Literature. Vol. 2: Latin Literature. Cambridge University Press. pp. 467–494. doi:10.1017/CHOL9780521210430.024.
- Duckworth, G. E. 1966. "Studies in Latin Hexameter Poetry." Transactions and Proceedings of the American Philological Association 97: 67–113.
- Fairclough, H. R. (1922). "The Poems of the Appendix Vergiliana". Transactions and Proceedings of the American Philological Association. 53: 5–34. JSTOR 282854.
- Frank, T. 1920. "Vergil's Apprenticeship. I." Classical Philology 15.1: 23–38.
- Gudeman, Alfred (1899). "Pseudo-Vergiliana". Latin Literature of the Empire. Vol. II: Poetry. New York and London: Harper & Brothers. pp. 1–32.
- Nettleship, H. (1879). Ancient Lives of Vergil. Oxford: Clarendon Press.
- Peirano, Irene. 2012. The Rhetoric of the Roman Fake: Latin Pseudepigrapha in Context. Cambridge, UK: Cambridge Univ. Press.
- Rand, E. K. (1919). "Young Virgil's Poetry". Harvard Studies in Classical Philology. 30: 103–185. JSTOR 310615.
- Reeve, Michael D. 1976. "The Textual Tradition of the Appendix Vergiliana. Maia 28.3: 233–254.

Culex

- Barrett, A. A. (April–June 1970). "The Authorship of the Culex: An Evaluation of the Evidence". Latomus. 29 (2): 348–362. JSTOR 41527664.
- Barrett, A. A. 1970. "The Catalogue of Trees in the Culex." Classical World 63.7: 230–232.
- Barrett, A. A. (July–September 1976). "The Poet's Intentions in the Culex". Latomus. 35 (3): 567–574. JSTOR 41530093.
- Barrett, A. A. 1968. The Poetry of the Culex. Toronto: ProQuest Dissertations Publishing.
- Barrett, A. A. 1970. "The Topography of the Gnat's Descent". Classical Journal 65.6 : 255–257.
- Chambert, Régine. 2004. "Vergil's Epicureanism in his Early Poems." In Vergil, Philodemus, and the Augustans Edited by David Armstrong, 43–60. Austin: University of Texas Press
- Drew, D. L. 1925. Culex. Sources and Their Bearing on the Problem of Authorship. Oxford: Blackwell.
- Ellis, R. 1882. "On the Culex and Other Poems of the Appendix Vergiliana" The American Journal of Philology, Vol. 3, No. 11 (1882), pp. 271–284.
- Ellis, Robinson (May 1896). "A Theory of the Culex". The Classical Review. 10 (4): 177–183. JSTOR 691239.
- Fordyce C. J. 1932. "Octavius in the Culex." Classical Philology. 27.2: 174-174.
- Fraenkel, Ed. 1952. "The Culex." Journal of Roman Studies 42.1-2: 1–9.
- Jacobson, Howard. 2004. "The Date of Culex." Phoenix 58.3–4: 345–347.
- Kearey, T. 2018. "(Mis)reading the Gnat: Truth and Deception in the Pseudo-Virgilian Culex." Ramus 47.2: 174–196.
- Kennedy, D. F. 1982. "Gallus and the Culex." Classical Quarterly 32: 371–389.
- Most, Glenn. 1987. "The Virgilian Culex." In Homo Viator: Classical Essays for John Bramble. Edited by Bramble, J. C., Michael Whitby, Philip R Hardie, and Mary Whitby, 199–209.
- Ross, D. O. 1975. "The Culex and Moretum as Post-Augustan Literary Parodies." Harvard Studies in Classical Philology 79: 235–263.
- Walker L. V. 1929. "Vergil's Descriptive Art." Classical Journal 24.9: 666–679.

Ciris

- Connors, Catherine. 1991. "Simultaneous Hunting and Herding at Ciris 297–300." The Classical Quarterly 41.2: 556–559.
- Gorman, Vanessa B. 1995. "Vergilian Models for the Characterization of Scylla in the Ciris." Vergilius 41: 35–48.
- Kayachev, Boris. 2016. "Allusion and Allegory: Studies in the Ciris." Beiträge zur Altertumskunde 346. Berlin and Boston: De Gruyter.
- Knox, P. E. 1983. "Cinna, the Ciris, and Ovid." Classical Philology 78.4, 309–311.
- Lyne, R. O. A. M. 1978. Ciris. A Poem Attributed to Vergil. Cambridge: Cambridge University Press.
- Lyne, R. 1971. "The Dating of the Ciris." The Classical Quarterly 21.1: 233–253.
- Richardson L., Jr. 1944. Poetical Theory in Republican Rome. An Analytical Discussion of the Shorter Narrative Poems Written in Latin during the First Century B. C. New Haven: Yale University Press.
- Steele, R. B. 1930. "The Authorship of the Ciris." The American Journal of Philology 51.2: 148–184.

Copa

- Cutolo Paolo. 1990. "The Genre of the Copa." ARCA: Classical and Medieval Texts, Papers, and Monographs 29: 115–119.
- Drew, D. 1923. "The Copa." The Classical Quarterly 17.2: 73–81.
- Drabkin, I. 1930. The Copa: An Investigation of the Problem of Date and Authorship, with Notes On Some Passages of the Poem. Geneva, N.Y.: The W.F. Humphrey Press.
- Goodyear F. R. D. 1977. "The Copa. A Text and Commentary." Bulletin of the Institute of Classical Studies 24: 117–131.
- Grant, Mark. 2001. "The "Copa:" Poetry, Youth, and the Roman Bar." Proceedings of the Virgil Society 24: 121-134.
- Henderson, John. 2002. "Corny Copa: The Motel Muse." In Cultivating the Muse: Struggles for Power and Inspiration in Classical Literature. Edited by Effrosini Spentzou and Don Fowler, 253–278. Oxford: Oxford Univ. Press.
- McCracken, G. 1932. "The Originality of the "Copa"." The Classical Journal 28.2: 124-127.
- Rosivach, Vincent J. 1996. "The Sociology of the Copa." Latomus 55.3: 605–614.
- Tarrant Richard J. 1992. "Nights at the Copa: Observations on Language and Date." Harvard Studies in Classical Philology 94: 331–347.

Moretum

- Douglas, F. L. 1929. "A Study of the Moretum." Syracuse: Syracuse University.
- Fitzgerald, William. 1996. "Labor and Laborer in Latin Poetry: The Case of the Moretum." Arethusa 29.3: 389–418.
- Horsfall, Nicholas. 2001. "The "Moretum" Decomposed." Classica et Medioevalia 52: 303–317.
- Kenney E. J. 1984. Moretum. The Ploughman's Lunch, A Poem Ascribed to Virgil. Bristol: Bristol Classical Press.
- Rosivach, Vincent J. 1994. "Humbler Fare in the Moretum." NECN 22: 57–59.
- Ross, D. O. 1975. "The Culex and Moretum as Post-Augustan Literary Parodies." Harvard Studies in Classical Philology 79: 235–263

Dirae

- Breed, Brian W. 2012. "The Pseudo-Vergilian Dirae and the Earliest Responses to Vergilian Pastoral." Trends in Classics 4.1: 3–28.
- Fraenkel, E. 1966. "The Dirae." The Journal of Roman Studies 56: 142-155
- Goodyear, F. R. D. 1971. "The Dirae." Proceedings of the Cambridge Philological Society 17: 30–43.
- Mackie, C. 1992." Vergil's Dirae, South Italy, and Etruria." Phoenix 46.4: 352–361.
- Thomas, Richard F. 1988. "Exhausted Oats ([Verg.] Dirae 15)?" The American Journal of Philology 109.1: 69-70
- van der Graaf, Cornelis. 1945. The Dirae: With Translation and an Investigation of its Authorship. Leiden: Brill.

Lydia

- Kayachev, Boris (2023). Lydia, a poem from the Appendix vergiliana: introduction, text, translation, and commentary. Oxford; New York, NY: Oxford University Press. ISBN 9780192874511.

Catalepton

- Carlson, Gregory I. and Ernst A. Schmidt. 1971. “From and Transformation in Vergil's Catalepton.” The American Journal of Philology 92.2: 252–265.
- Holzberg, N. 2004. "Impersonating Young Virgil: The Author of the Catalepton and His Libellus." Materiali E Discussioni per L'analisi Dei Testi Classici 52: 29–40.
- Kajanto, I. 1975. "Who was Sabinus Ille? A Reinterpretation of Catalepton 10." Arctos9 : 47–55.
- Khan, H. 1967. "The Humor of Catullus, Carm. 4, and the Theme of Virgil, Catalepton 10." The American Journal of Philology 88.2: 163-172
- Radford, R. 1923. "The Language of the Pseudo-Vergilian Catalepton with Especial Reference to Its Ovidian Characteristics." Transactions and Proceedings of the American Philological Association 54: 168–186.
- Reeve, M. D. 1975. "The Textual Tradition of Aetna, Ciris and Catalepton." Maia 27: 231–247.
- Richardson, L. 1972. "Catullus 4 and Catalepton 10 Again." The American Journal of Philology 93.1: 215–222.
- Richmond, J. A. 1974. "The Archetype of the Priapea and Catalepton." Hermes 102: 300–304.
- Schoonhoven, H. 1983. The Panegyricus Messallae. Date and relation with Catalepton 9. Aufstieg und Niedergang der römischen Welt 30.3 : 1681–1707.
- Syme, R. 1958. "Sabinus the Muleteer." Latomus 17.1: 73–80.
