= Eclogue 9 =

Poem by Virgil

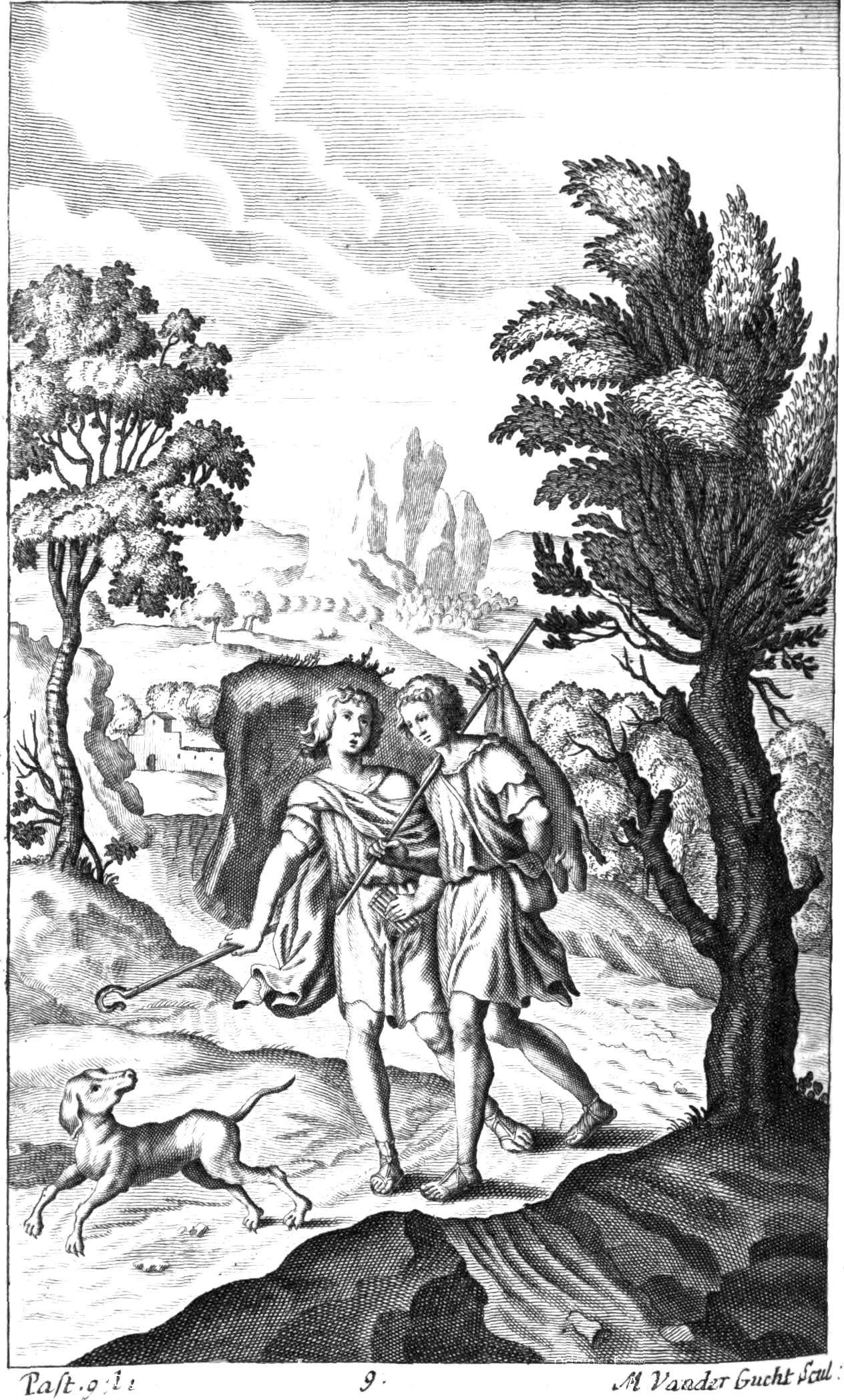
Engraving for Dryden's Virgil, 1709

Eclogue 9 (Ecloga IX; Bucolica IX) is a pastoral poem by the Latin poet Virgil, one of his series of ten poems known as the Eclogues. This eclogue describes the meeting of two countrymen Lycidas and Moeris. Moeris has been turned out of his farm and is taking some kid goats to town for the new occupant; young Lycidas is astonished, for he had heard that Menalcas (i.e. Virgil) had secured the safety of the district by his poetry, but Moeris replies that, so far from that being so, he and Menalcas himself had barely escaped with their lives: they then proceed to recall passages of Menalcas' poetry. Lycidas wants to continue singing to lighten the journey but the distressed Moeris begs him to cease, promising that they will sing again when Menalcas returns.

In the symmetrical scheme of the Eclogues, this poem is the pair of Eclogue 1, which is also a dialogue about the land confiscations of 40 BC, contrasting the fate of a farmer who has been displaced with one who has been allowed to stay.

== Background ==
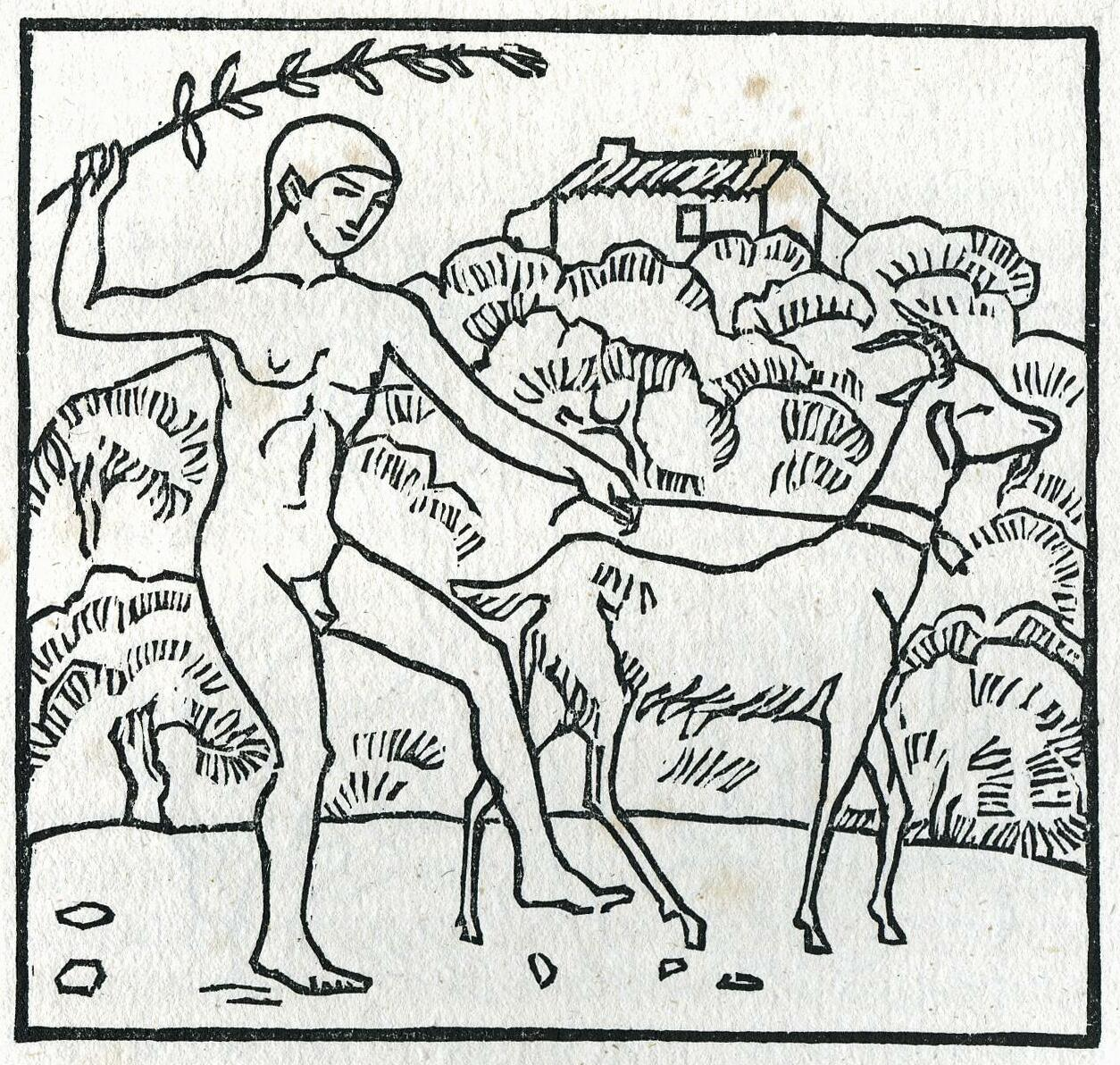
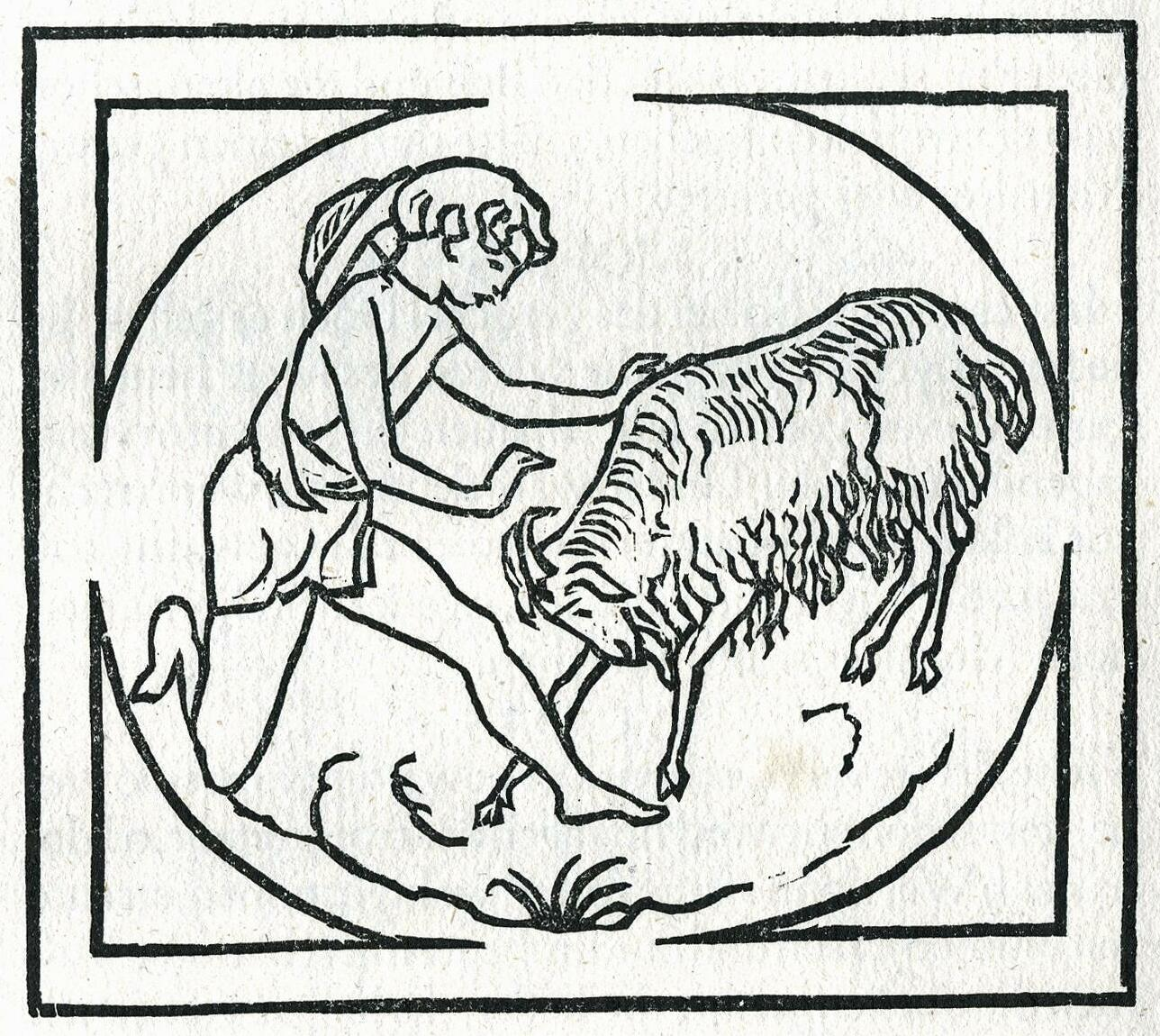
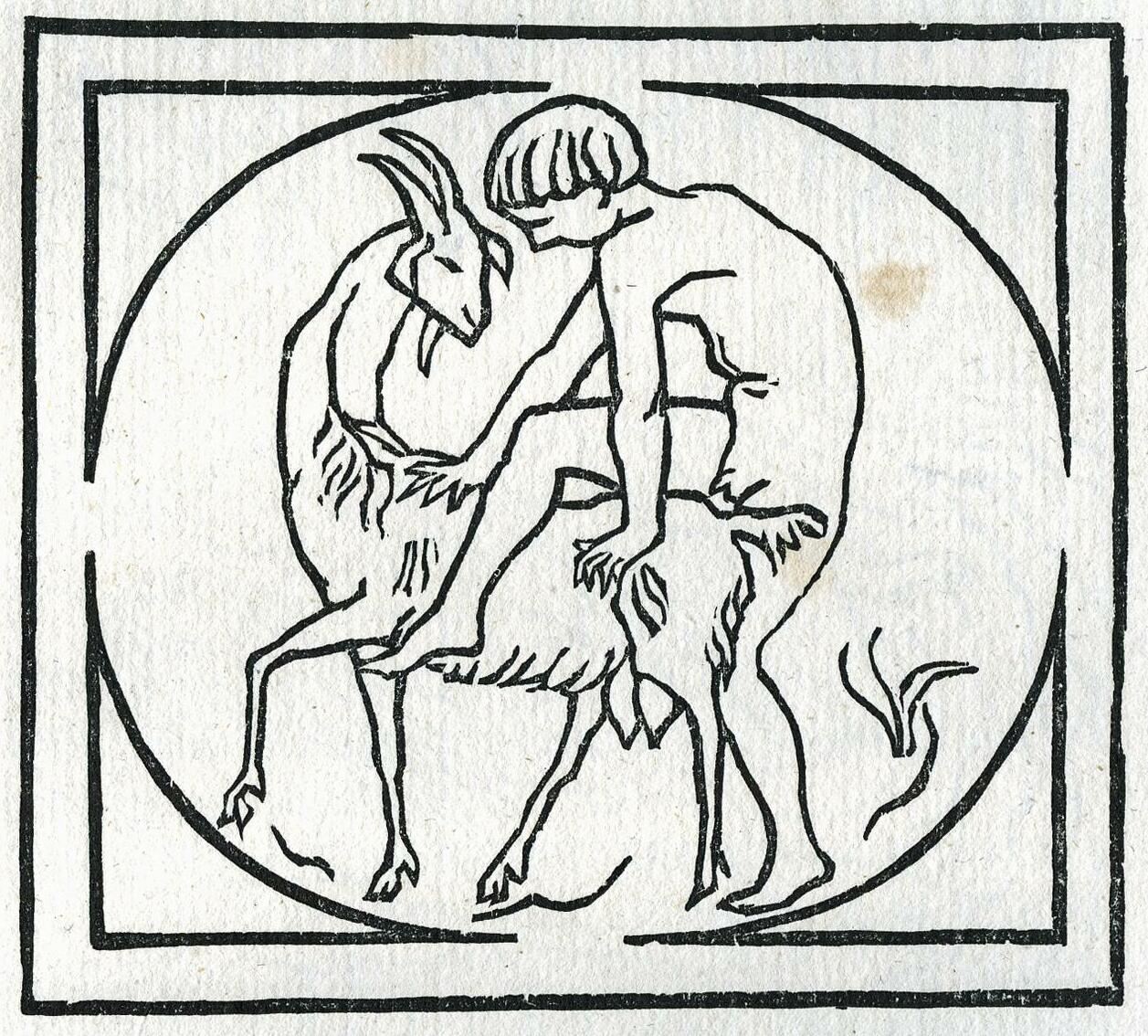
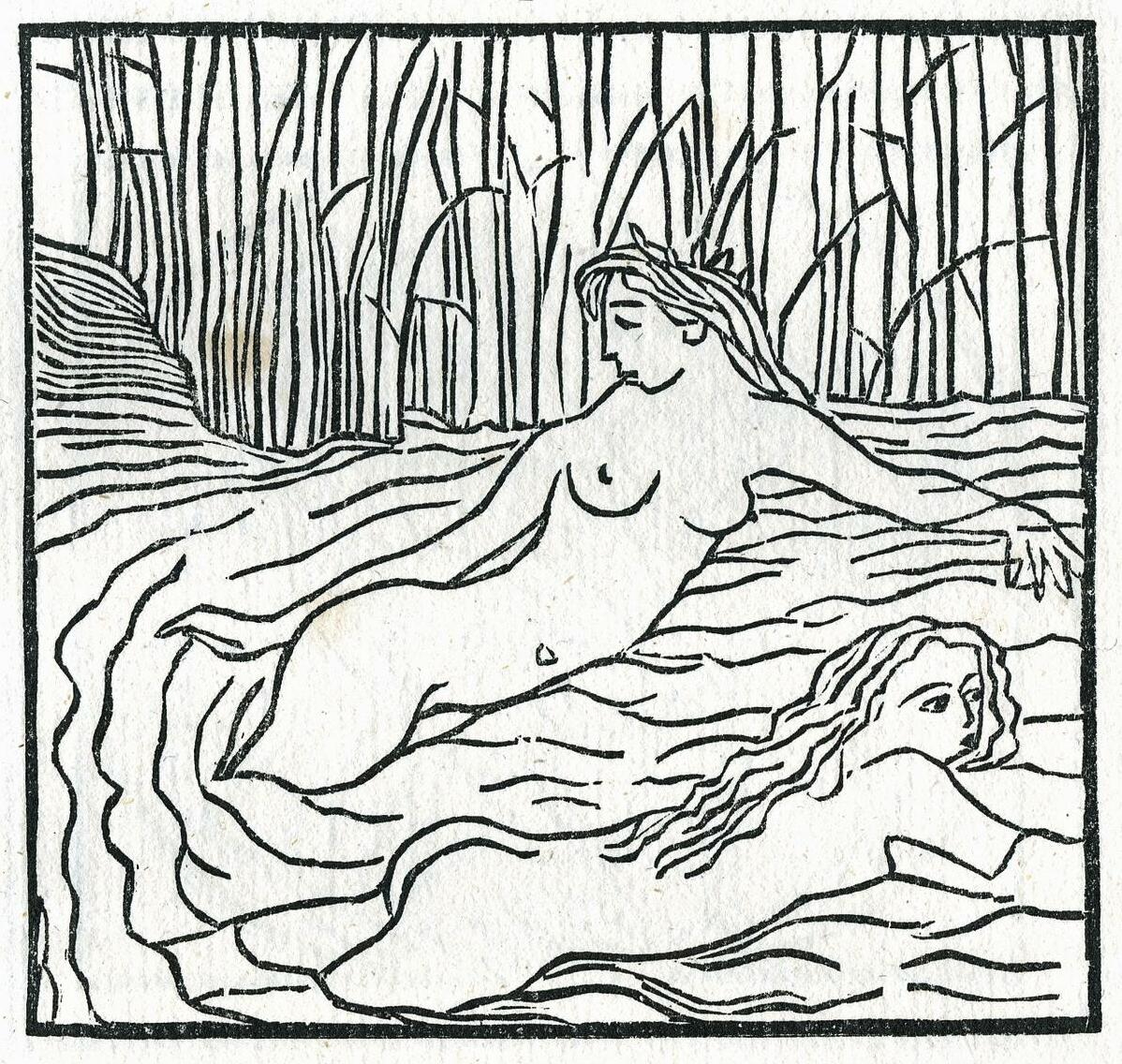
Woodcuts by Aristide Maillol, 1926, illustrating Eclogue 9

In the second distribution of Italian lands (BC 40), the city of Cremona, among other cities which had supported Brutus and Cassius in the civil war, was subject to confiscation of its farmland to settle veteran soldiers. In 40 BC, the task of distributing the land was given to Alfenus Varus, while Cornelius Gallus was in charge of taxing the northern Italian cities not affected by confiscation. It seems that the land of Cremona was insufficient, and that the confiscations were extended 15 miles into the land of Mantua, situated some 40 miles to the east of Cremona. A sentence from a speech of Cornelius Gallus is quoted by the ancient commentator Servius Auctus in which Gallus complains that, although ordered to leave three miles of land around Mantua, Varus had taken land almost up to the city walls.

The role of Virgil in this is not certain. It is thought that he championed the rights of the Mantuans who had lost their land, but he was clearly not entirely successful, since in Georgics 2.198 he states that Mantua unhappily had lost its land. Virgil is said to have come from the village of Andes (thought to be Pietole, 3 miles south-east of Mantua). As Wilkinson points out, we do not know if Virgil himself lost any land in the confiscation, or what the relationship was between himself (represented by "Menalcas" in this eclogue) and "Moeris". Menalcas, who is here referred to as an adept in song, has been identified as Virgil himself.

The general plan of the Eclogue is copied from the seventh Idyll of Theocritus, but with the situation reversed; for in Theocritus the speakers are on their way from town to the country, while in Virgil they are heading to town. Here and there in the eclogue parts of other Theocritus idylls are loosely translated, such as Idyll 3 (lines 23–25), Idyll 11 (lines 38–43), Idyll 14 (line 54) and Idyll 2 (lines 57–58).

== The four songs ==
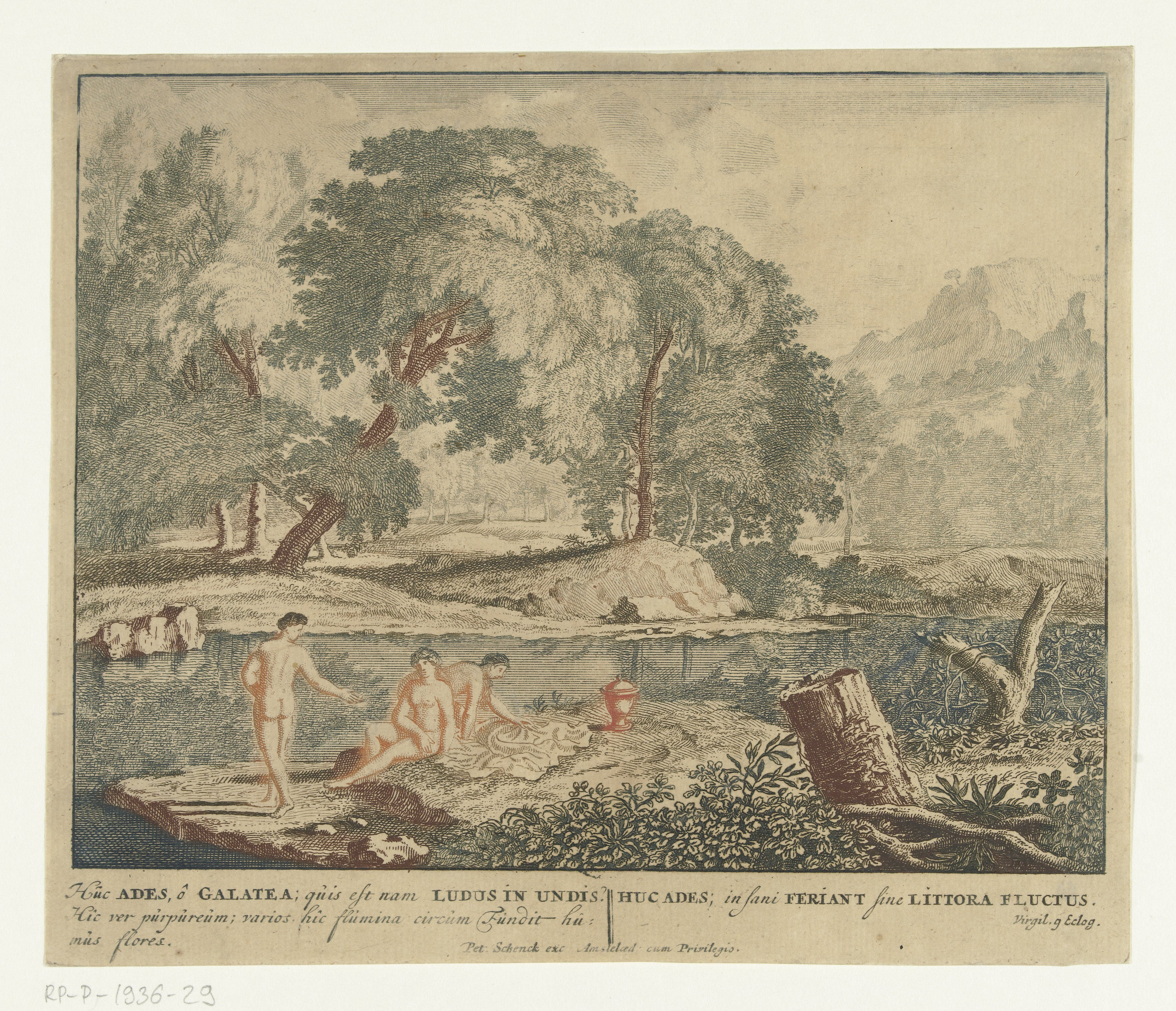
Print by Jan van Call I illustrating Eclogue 9, 39–43

As they walk to town, the youthful Lycidas and the older Moeris sing portions of four songs, all apparently composed by Menalcas (though some critics have suggested that the second pair are by Moeris and Lycidas themselves). Lycidas sings a three-line song, answered by Moeris with a three-line song; then Moeris sings a five-line song, answered by a five-line song sung by Lycidas. The two pairs exhibit parallelism, that is, each pair is a miniature example of amoebaean singing, of the kind found also in Eclogues 3, 5, 7, and 8. The first of each pair has a Theocritean theme, and in each case the answer has a Roman theme. It has also been argued that the two sung by Lycidas have an optimistic mood, expressing hope for the future, while the two sung by Moeris are pessimistic, expressing nostalgia for the past.

- The first song, sung by Lycidas, is addressed to Tityrus. It is a request which Lycidas says he heard Moeris give Tityrus, while Moeris went off to visit Amaryllis, asking him to take his goats to drink water, but to beware of the billy-goat, who butts with his horns. The lines are a translation of Theocritus Idyll 3.3–5, and the names Amaryllis and Tityrus are also from the same poem.
- The second song, sung by Moeris, is addressed to Varus. It refers to the land confiscations near Cremona and Mantua in 40 BC in which many farmers were displaced to make way for veteran soldiers. The song promises to praise Varus if he can save Virgil's home town of Mantua "alas, too close to wretched Cremona".

At this point Lycidas praises Moeris and asks him to continue. He declares that he too is a poet, although compared to the poets Varius and Cinna he is like a goose squawking amongst swans. (These words are adapted from Theocritus Idyll 7.37–41, in which the speaker compares himself to the poet Philitas as "a frog amongst crickets".)

- The third song, sung by Moeris, is addressed to the sea-nymph Galatea. It is adapted from Theocritus's Idyll 11.42–49, a song of the one-eyed giant Polyphemus. In Virgil's version Polyphemus tries to woo Galatea by describing the beauty of the countryside in springtime.
- The fourth song, sung by Lycidas, is addressed to Daphnis (the legendary herdsman, said to have invented bucolic poetry), bidding him to look at Caesar's Comet (an exceptionally bright comet that was seen in July 44 BC and was held to represent Julius Caesar's ascension to heaven). The singer describes the beauty of autumn which the star heralds and encourages Daphnis to plant pear-trees for his grandchildren to enjoy.

After this Moeris complains that, because of his age, he can no longer remember the songs, and even his voice has given out. ("The wolves have seen Moeris first" – a saying explained by Pliny the Elder as warning that if a wolf sees you before you see it, you will be struck dumb). Lycidas replies that the wind has died down, and they have now reached the halfway point of the road, where a grove of trees surrounding a certain tomb will make a suitable place for a rest; or if Moeris is afraid they may not reach town before nightfall or be caught in the rain, Lycidas can help Moeris carry the kid goats while he and Moeris continue singing. But the unhappy Moeris begs him to stop singing and concentrate on their task, until such time as Menalcas will return.

== The characters ==
=== Lycidas ===
Lycidas is described by Moeris as a "boy" (9.66), and in Eclogue 7.67 a character of the same name is addressed as Lycida formose 'handsome Lycidas'. Some critics have seen him as standing for Virgil himself. One writes: "It is Lycidas who is at the centre of the piece, the most attractive, perhaps, of all the characters which Virgil has portrayed in the Eclogues." In lines 32–36 he claims to be a poet himself, ambitious to compete with the well-known poets Lucius Varius Rufus and Helvius Cinna. It is "possible to imagine him as representative not only of a younger generation, but also of a more modern outlook than that of Moeris". He has an optimistic outlook and believes that poetry can persuade (10), console (18), and provide pleasure (64). The name occurs in Theocritus 7, but there he is a goatherd, not a boy.

=== Moeris ===
Moeris is an older man, and has a more pessimistic and disillusioned outlook. It is he who sings "Mantua, alas! too close to wretched Cremona!" (28). He adheres to traditional beliefs: he mentions the omen of a crow that warned him of coming danger (15) and the wolves which struck him dumb (54). In Eclogue 8.95–99 a character of the name Moeris (possibly the same person) is described as skilled at doing witchcraft using magic herbs. The name does not occur in Theocritus.

=== Menalcas ===
The character of Menalcas occurs in several Eclogues. In Eclogue 3, he engages in a singing contest with Damoetas (the result is a draw). In Eclogue 5, he caps Mopsus's song about Daphnis with one of his own, and in 5.85–87 he claims to be the author of Eclogues 2 and 3, which he quotes by their first lines. In Eclogue 10, in the guise of a cowherd, he consoles the love-sick poet Cornelius Gallus, who is imagined to have retired to Arcadia. Since the time of Quintilian (8.6.47) he has been seen as representing Virgil himself. In Theocritus Menalcas is merely a shepherd, but in Virgil he also herds cows (Ec. 3.29ff, 49, 109; Ec. 10.20), thus equating him with the legendary Daphnis. In Ec. 3.16 it is implied that Menalcas is a dominus 'landowner, master', and the same appears to be true in this eclogue, where he acts as champion for tenant-farmers (coloni, line 4) like Moeris.

=== Tityrus ===
In the Theocritus lines (Idyll 3.3ff) translated by Virgil, Tityrus is a "dear friend" of the unnamed goatherd who asks him to look after his goats. In Virgil, on the other hand, he may be a slave, since he is repeatedly ordered around by other herdsmen. In Eclogue 1 he appears to be a former slave who has been granted his freedom. In Eclogue 6.4, Virgil refers to himself as "Tityrus", representing himself as a singer of pastoral poetry.

=== Varus ===
Publius Alfenus Varus was a politician and lawyer, said to have been born in Cremona. He became consul suffectus in 39 BC. At the time of this poem he appears to have held the post of land commissioner, charged with distributing land to veteran soldiers in 40 BC. It is not known if he responded to Virgil's plea to save Mantua, but Virgil dedicated Eclogue 6 to him (6.6–12), though politely declining to celebrate Varus's military achievements in a poem.

=== Varius ===
Lucius Varius Rufus was a poet contemporary with Virgil, about four years older than him; he was a friend of Virgil, and introduced him to Maecenas, who was to become Virgil's patron when he wrote his next poem, the Georgics. He was famous for writing epic poetry as well as a tragedy called Thyestes praised by Quintilian (10.1.98). In his well-known Satire 1.5, Horace describes how he, Virgil, and Varius all accompanied Maecenas on a journey to Brundisium in the spring of 37 BC. He was eventually to become Virgil's literary executor and helped publish the Aeneid.

=== Cinna ===
Gaius Helvius Cinna was a poet of a previous generation (he died in 44 BC). He was a friend of Catullus and was famous for writing a mythological poem called Zmyrna (now lost).

=== Daphnis ===
Daphnis in Greek mythology is the legendary Sicilian cowherd (Greek βουκόλος (boukólos)) who is said to have invented "bucolic" poetry. Eclogue 5 consists of a pair of songs lamenting his death and commemorating his deification.

=== Bianor ===
The tomb of a certain Bianor is mentioned in the poem at the halfway point on the road. This detail is taken from Theocritus 7.10–11, where however the tomb is that of a certain Brasilas. It is possible that Virgil borrowed the name Bianor from a Greek epigram, an epitaph for a son buried by his mother. But the name also occurs in Homer, Iliad 11.92, in the same place in the line, where Bianor (or Bienor) is described as "a shepherd (i.e. commander) of the army" (Βιάνορα ποιμένα λαῶν) and is killed by Agamemnon. The fact that Bianor is killed at lunchtime when men take their rest makes the choice of name even more appropriate. Bianor is only metaphorically a shepherd, but a few lines later Agamemnon kills two men who really are shepherds and who a short time earlier had been pasturing sheep. Brenk quotes Taplin: "The pathos of the ruthless warrior cutting down the innocent pastoral world is quintessentially Homeric." The mention of cutting foliage from the trees also recalls the lines in Homer immediately preceding the killing of Bianor, which describe a wood-cutter cutting trees in a forest.

According to the ancient commentator Servius, Bianor was another name for Ocnus, the founder of Mantua, mentioned in Aeneid 10.198–200. Most scholars reject this as a mere guess, since there is no other evidence for this identification. However, Adkin sees a possible reference to Ocnus in the apparent acrostic OCNI 'of Ocnus' in lines 51–54. In support of this he quotes an epigram from the Greek Anthology (9.51) which Virgil partly translates in line 50: "Age takes away everything (= omnia fert aetas): a long time knows how to change name and shape and nature and fortune." The letters OCNI (Adkin suggests) might also be read as the Greek word ὀκνεῖ 'he hesitates' or 'he fears'.

== UNDIS acrostic ==
In recent years a number of acrostics have been discovered in Virgil's works. This eclogue appears to contain at least two. The first is the word UNDIS 'in the waves' picked out in the initial letters of lines 34–38. This is immediately followed by the line huc ades, Galatea; quis est nam ludus in undis? 'come here, Galatea; for what is your game in the waves?'. The "game" here appears to be that Virgil has placed a goose and some swans (allegorically representing three poets) in line 36, right in the middle of the acrostic UNDIS. It is also thought that the words credulus illis nam neque adhuc in lines 34–35 acronymically pick out the name of the poet Cinna, who is mentioned in line 35, and that the word anser 'goose' in line 36 is possibly a pun on the name of another poet, Anser, who is mentioned along with Cinna in Ovid's Tristia 2.535.

A second acrostic DEA DIO- 'the goddess Dione' occurs a few lines later in 46–51, opposite the mention of Dionaei Caesaris 'Dione's descendant Caesar' (the goddess Dione) (line 47). According to Adkin, the word ecce 'look!' in line 47 is a pointer to the presence of an acrostic.

For another possible acrostic, OCNI ('of Ocnus' or ὀκνεῖ 'he/she hesitates') in lines 51–54, see the section on Bianor above.

== Sources and further reading ==
- Adkin, N. (2014). "Read the edge: Acrostics in Virgil’s Sinon Episode". Acta Classica Universitatis Scientiarum Debreceniensis, 50, 45–72.
- Adkin, N. (2015). "Quis est nam ludus in undis? (Virgil, Eclogue IX 39–43)". Acta Classica Universitatis Scientiarum Debreceniensis, 51, 43–58.
- Badian, E.; Honoré, T. (2000). "Alfenus Varus, Publius". Who's Who in the Classical World. Oxford.
- Becker, Andrew (1999). "Poetry as Equipment for Living: A Gradual Reading of Vergil's Ninth Eclogue". Classics Ireland. 6: 1–22. doi:10.2307/25528339. JSTOR 25528339.
- Brenk, F. E. (1981). "War and the Shepherd: The Tomb of Bianor in Vergil's Ninth Eclogue". The American Journal of Philology, Vol. 102, No. 4 (Winter, 1981), pp. 427–430.
- Flintoff, T. E. S. (March 1976), Characterisation in Virgil's Eclogues: A Lecture to the Virgil Society (PDF), pp. 16–26
- Greenough, J. B., ed. (1883). Publi Vergili Maronis: Bucolica. Aeneis. Georgica. The Greater Poems of Virgil. Vol. 1. Boston, MA: Ginn, Heath, & Co. pp. 25–7. (public domain)
- Grishin, A. A. (2008). "Ludus in undis: an acrostic in Eclogue 9". Harvard Studies in Classical Philology, 104, 237–240.
- Page, T. E., ed. (1898). P. Vergili Maronis: Bucolica et Georgica. Classical Series. London: Macmillan & Co., Ltd. pp. 165–72. (public domain)
- Perkell, C. (2001). "Vergil reading his twentieth-century readers: a study of Eclogue 9". Vergilius (1959–), 47, 64–88.
- Segal, C. P. (1965). "Tamen Cantabitis, Arcades: Exile and Arcadia in Eclogues One and Nine". Arion: A Journal of Humanities and the Classics. Vol. 4, No. 2 (Summer, 1965), pp. 237–266.
- Steenkamp, J. (2011). "The structure of Vergil's Eclogues". In Acta Classica: Proceedings of the Classical Association of South Africa (Vol. 54, No. 1, pp. 101-124). Classical Association of South Africa (CASA).
- Tracy, S. V. (1982). "Sepulcrum Bianoris: Virgil Eclogues 9. 59-61". Classical Philology, Vol. 77, No. 4 (Oct., 1982), pp. 328–330.
- Wilkinson, L. P. (1966). "Virgil and the Evictions". Hermes, 94(H. 3), 320–324.
