= Baehrens =

Baehrens is a surname. Notable people with the surname include:

- Emil Baehrens (1848–1888), German classical scholar
- Heike Baehrens (born 1955), German deaconess, religious educator, and politician
- Wilhelm Baehrens (1885–1929), German classical scholar

== See also ==
- Behrens
