= Albinovana gens =

Ancient Roman family

The gens Albinovana was an obscure plebeian family at ancient Rome. No members of this gens are known to have held any of the higher offices of the Roman state, and hardly any are mentioned in history. The family is perhaps best known from Publius Albinovanus, an infamous participant in the civil war between Marius and Sulla, and from the first-century poet Albinovanus Pedo. A number of Albinovani are known from inscriptions.

== Origin ==
The nomen Albinovanus belongs to a class of gentilicia ending in -anus, of which some are derived from place names, but many are also typical of Etruria. The first of this family to appear in history, Publius Albinovanus, was among the partisans of Gaius Marius, who indeed had a large Etruscan clientele, making that a likely origin for the Albinovani. The same Albinovanus later commanded a legion of Lucanians in 82 BC, suggesting an affinity with that region instead, but there is no further evidence of such a connection. In older scholarship, Albinovanus was not recognized as a nomen gentilicium, and was supposed to be a cognomen belonging to another gens. Publius Albinovanus, the partisan of Marius, was thought to belong to the Tullia gens, and so was identified as "Publius Tullius Albinovanus".

== Praenomina ==
The only praenomina associated with the Albinovani mentioned by Roman writers or found in inscriptions are Publius and Gaius, two of the most common names throughout all periods of Roman history.

== Members ==
This list includes abbreviated praenomina. For an explanation of this practice, see filiation.

- Publius Albinovanus, a partisan of Marius, whom Sulla outlawed in 88 BC. Later a legate of Gaius Norbanus, Albinovanus obtained Sulla's pardon by inviting Norbanus' chief officers to a banquet, where he murdered them, then betrayed Ariminium to Sulla's forces. Florus erroneously refers to Albinovanus as one of the consuls of 88 BC.
- Publius Albinovanus, one of the flamines minores in the College of Pontifices from at least 69 BC to 57 BC or later. Cicero and Macrobius mention him in a list of pontifices, but do not identify his priesthood more specifically. He might be the same Albinovanus who sided first with Marius, then Sulla during their first civil war.
- Albinovanus, one of the accusers of Publius Sestius, whom Cicero defended on a charge of vis in 56 BC. Cicero impeached the testimony of Publius Vatinius, Sestius' chief accuser, who first claimed to have hardly known Albinovanus, then admitted to discussing the case against Sestius with him in detail.
- Albinovanus Celsus, a scriba and companion of Tiberius, mentioned by Horace in AD 20. He is probably the same person as the poet Celsus mentioned by Horace, whose death is lamented by Ovid. He was probably the father or brother of Albinovanus Pedo.
- (Gaius) Albinovanus Pedo, (Note: The praenomen Gaius is traditionally assigned to the poet, but does not appear in any of the primary sources.) a poet and friend of Ovid, is likely the same Pedo who commanded the cavalry of Germanicus during the latter's campaign in Germania in AD 15.

=== Albinovani from inscriptions ===
- Publius Albinovanus, named in an inscription from Rome, perhaps to be identified with the Marian partisan, or the pontifex.
- Albinovana P. l. Ac[...], a freedwoman of Publius Albinovanus, named in an inscription from Rome, dating from the first century BC.
- Albinovana Felicula, commemorated in an inscription from Rome as having made a gift of some sort to her brother, Albinovanus Priscus. The inscription is thought to be from the middle or later first century, but may be a forgery.
- Albinovana C. l. Iame, a freedwoman who dedicated a first-century family sepulchre at Rome for her parents, Lucius Oppius Iamo and Oppia Grapte.
- Publius Albinovanus P. l. Meander, one of the freedmen of Publius Albinovanus, named in an inscription from Rome, dating from the first century BC.
- Albinovana P. l. Nice, a freedwoman named in an inscription from Rome, dating to the Julio-Claudian dynasty.
- Publius Albinovanus P. l. Philippus, one of the freedmen of Publius Albinovanus, named in an inscription from Rome, dating from the first century BC.
- Publius Albinovanus P. l. Philomusus, one of the freedmen of Publius Albinovanus, named in an inscription from Rome, dating from the first century BC.
- Albinovanus Philoxenus, together with Otatius Eros, Lollius Secundus, and Didius Primus, made an offering to the gods of reason, commemorated in an inscription dating from the first half of the first century, from the country of the Marsi, found at modern Pereto.
- Albinovanus Priscus, received a gift from his sister, Albinovana Felicula, according to a first-century inscription from Rome, perhaps a modern forgery.
- Albinovana C. f. Threpte, the daughter of Gaius Albinovanus Threptus, who built a second-century tomb at Rome for her.
- Gaius Albinovanus Threptus, dedicated a second-century tomb at Rome for his daughter, Albinovana Threpte.
- Gaius Albinovanus Xan[...], buried at Rome in a tomb built by Oppia Thumele for herself and Albinovanus.
- Albinovana Ɔ. l. Zenis, a freedwoman named along with the freedman Lucius Aquillius Surus, in an inscription from Rome dating from the first half of the first century.

== See also ==
- List of Roman gentes

== Bibliography ==
- Marcus Tullius Cicero, De Haruspicum Responsis, In Vatinium Testem.
- Quintus Horatius Flaccus (Horace), Epistulae.
- Publius Ovidius Naso (Ovid), Epistulae ex Ponto (Letters from Pontus).
- Lucius Annaeus Seneca (Seneca the Elder), Controversiae, Suasoriae (Rhetorical Exercises).
- Lucius Annaeus Seneca (Seneca the Younger), Epistulae Morales ad Lucilium (Moral Letters to Lucilius).
- Publius Cornelius Tacitus, Annales.
- Lucius Annaeus Florus, Epitome de T. Livio Bellorum Omnium Annorum DCC (Epitome of Livy: All the Wars of Seven Hundred Years).
- Appianus Alexandrinus (Appian), Bellum Civile (The Civil War).
- Ambrosius Theodosius Macrobius, Saturnalia.
- Dictionary of Greek and Roman Biography and Mythology, William Smith, ed., Little, Brown and Company, Boston (1849).
- Theodor Mommsen et alii, Corpus Inscriptionum Latinarum (The Body of Latin Inscriptions, abbreviated CIL), Berlin-Brandenburgische Akademie der Wissenschaften (1853–present).
- René Cagnat et alii, L'Année épigraphique (The Year in Epigraphy, abbreviated AE), Presses Universitaires de France (1888–present).
- August Pauly, Georg Wissowa, et alii, Realencyclopädie der Classischen Altertumswissenschaft (Scientific Encyclopedia of the Knowledge of Classical Antiquities, abbreviated PW), J. B. Metzler, Stuttgart (1894–1980).
- George Davis Chase, "The Origin of Roman Praenomina", in Harvard Studies in Classical Philology, vol. VIII, pp. 103–184 (1897).
- Studi Romani, Istituto Nazionale di Studi Romani, Rome.
- Syme, Ronald, The Roman Revolution, Oxford: Clarendon Press, 1939 (archived online).
- T. Robert S. Broughton, The Magistrates of the Roman Republic, American Philological Association (1952–1986).
- Katz, Barry R., "The First Fruits of Sulla's March", L'Antiquité Classique, vol. 44, no. 1 (1975), pages 100–125, ISSN 0770-2817, JSTOR 41650261.
