= Anser (poet) =

Anser was a minor poet of ancient Rome who lived in the 1st century BC. He is mentioned by Ovid as a writer of love poetry associated with Catullus, Calvus and Cinna. According to the 4th-century AD grammarian Servius, he was a "very bad poet" who wrote in praise of the triumvir Mark Antony and was a detractor of Virgil. None of his work is known to have survived.

== Cicero and Ovid ==
The earliest writer to mention the name Anser is Cicero (Philippic 13.11), who in 43 BC speaks of some Ansers who were supporters of Mark Antony. In the quotation below, Cicero is saying that Sextus Pompeius (Pompey the Great's son) should be allowed to reclaim his father's property which had been seized by Antony:

"The Alban and Formian villas he will recover from Dolabella; the Tusculan villa he will also recover from Antonius. And these Ansers who are joining in the attack on Mutina and in the blockade of Decimus Brutus will be driven from his Falernian villa."

More than 50 years later Ovid (Tristia 2.435), in a list of writers of risqué Latin love poetry, mentions a poet Anser in association with Catullus and Catullus's friend Calvus:

Cinna quoque his comes est, Cinnaque procacior Anser
"Cinna is a companion to these (i.e. Catullus and Calvus), and Anser, who was (even) more risqué than Cinna"

Putting this evidence together with the information given by Servius (see below) that the poet Anser was a supporter of Mark Antony, it is conjectured by many scholars that he was one of the Ansers mentioned by Cicero, and that he was perhaps gifted an estate in the Falernian region in Campania by his patron.

== Virgil and Servius ==
Commenting on Virgil's Eclogue 7, 21, the 4th century AD grammarian Servius says: "Many people have supposed there is an allegory in this eclogue, so that Daphnis is Caesar, Corydon Virgil, and Thyrsis, who is defeated, one of Virgil's detractors, namely either Bavius or Anser or Maevius, very bad poets."

He makes a second mention of the poet in his comment on Virgil's Eclogue 9, 35–36, in which a young herdsman Lycidas says this about his skill in poetry:

nam neque adhuc Vario videor nec dicere Cinna
digna, sed argutos inter strepere anser olores

"For I do not yet seem to make songs worthy of Varius or Cinna,
but to make a noise like a goose (anser) among melodious swans".

Commenting on this line, Servius wrote: "He is alluding to a certain Anser, a poet of Antony's, who used to write praises of him (i.e. of Antony), and for this reason Virgil criticised him."

Some commentators have therefore suggested that the character Lycidas in Eclogue 9 represents Anser. Others, however, have cast doubt on Servius's claim, on the grounds that Servius is often unreliable.

Others again, even if they do not identify "Anser" with Lycidas, question whether there was ever a person who was actually named "Anser", or whether it was just a generic dismissal of a bad poet. However, the evidence from Cicero and Ovid seems to indicate that there really was a poet called Anser and that it was a genuine name.

== Propertius ==
Propertius (2.34.83–84), in a passage apparently imitating the lines from Eclogue 9 quoted above, also contrasts a swan and a goose, commenting on the latter's indocto carmine 'unlearned song'. However, the textual problems of these lines make it impossible to be confident about Propertius' exact text or meaning, and different scholars have expressed differing views about which poet is meant by the swan and which by the goose.
