= Albinovanus Pedo =

Roman poet

Gaius Albinovanus Pedo, sometimes mistakenly called C. Pedo Albinovanus, was a Roman poet who flourished during the Augustan age.

== Works ==
Albinovanus Pedo was a member of the gens Albinovana. He wrote a Theseis, referred to in a letter from his friend Ovid, epigrams which are commended by Martial and an epic poem on the exploits of Germanicus. He had the reputation of being an excellent raconteur, and Quintilian awards him qualified praise as a writer of epics.

All that remains of his works is a fragment preserved in the Suasoria of the rhetorician Seneca the Elder, from a description of the voyage of Germanicus (AD 16) through the river Ems to the Northern Ocean, when he was overtaken by the storm described by Tacitus. The cavalry commander spoken of by the historian is probably identical with the poet.

Three elegies were formerly attributed to Pedo by Scaliger; two on the death of Maecenas (In Obitum Maecenatis and De Verbis Maecenatis moribundi), and a consolatio addressed to Livia to console her for the death of her son Drusus (Consolatio ad Liviam de Morte Drusi or Epicedion Drusi, usually printed with Ovid's works); but it is now generally agreed that they are not by Pedo. The Consolatio has been put down as late as the 15th century as the work of an Italian imitator, there being no manuscripts and no trace of the poem before the publication of the editio princeps of Ovid in 1471. There is an English verse translation of the elegies by Edward Hayes Plumptre (1907).

== Sources ==
- E. Bahrens, Poetae Latini Minores (1879) and Fragmenta Poetarum Latinorum (1886)
- Moritz Haupt, Opuscula, i. (1875)
- Oskar Haube, Beitrag zur Kenntnis des Albinovanus Pedo (1880).
