= Publius Albinovanus =

Roman general

Publius Albinovanus (fl. 88–57 BC) was a Roman senator and a participant in the first round of civil wars of the Roman Republic. He was originally a strong supporter of Gaius Marius, for which he was briefly outlawed in 88–87 BC, but later, in 82, obtained the pardon of Sulla, Marius's enemy, by treacherously murdering many fellow army officers at a banquet. He probably held a priesthood later in life.

== Biography ==
His gens name, 'Albinovanus', indicates his family was probably of Etruscan origin. Indeed, he was a strong political supporter of Gaius Marius, the seven-time-consul, who had a large network of clients in Etruria. When Marius's enemy, Sulla, marched with an army onto Rome in 88 BC, Albinovanus (who was perhaps tribune of the plebs that year) took part in the defense of the capital, unsuccessfully throwing troops on Sulla's direction as he made his way into the city. Sulla had Albinovanus, Marius, and about ten others declared public enemies. Albinovanus fled and, along with Marius and the other surviving outlaws, took refuge with Hiempsal, the King of Numidia in north Africa. They did not stay long at his court, however, apparently because they feared the King would turn them in to the Roman government.

Albinovanus presumably returned to Rome in 87 BC after Marius's supporters, now in the absence of Sulla and his army, retook control of the government. By 82 BC he had apparently become a senator, and so probably held some magistracy after his return from exile. Albinovanus was a senior army officer in the renewed civil war against Sulla. In 82, he commanded a legion of Lucanians, which deserted to the enemy, since the war was going badly for them. Believing his cause to be hopeless, Albinovanus entered into secret correspondence with Sulla, who promised him a pardon should he accomplish something useful. Albinovanus did this by inviting many fellow to a banquet and had then having them all murdered. In consequence, Ariminium and many other nearby towns declared for Sulla.

One Publius Albinovanus recorded as having been a minor pontiff from around 69 to at least 57 BC. He is probably to be identified as the turncoat commander, or possibly a son.
