= Friedrich Vollmer =

German classical philologist

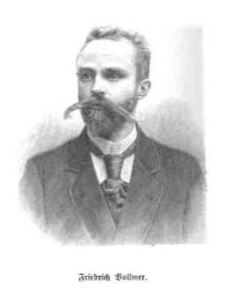
Friedrich Vollmer

Friedrich Karl Vollmer (14 November 1867, in Fingscheid, now part of Wuppertal – 21 September 1923, in Farchant) was a German classical philologist who specialized in Latin studies.

Vollmer studied classical philology at the University of Bonn and the Friedrich Wilhelm University of Berlin, receiving his doctorate in 1892. After graduation, he worked as a gymnasium teacher in Düsseldorf and Bonn and, in 1895, was named director of the German School in Brussels. In 1899, he relocated to Munich, where he was appointed head of the Thesaurus Linguae Latinae, a project that was initiated by Eduard Wölfflin. In 1905, he became a full professor of classical philology at the Ludwig-Maximilians-Universität München and, during the following year, a member of the Bavarian Academy of Sciences and Humanities.

== Selected works ==
- Das Nibelungenlied erläutert und gewürdigt, 1894 – The Nibelungenlied explained and appreciated.
- Goethes Egmont, 1895 – Goethe's Egmont.
- P. Papinii Statii Silvarum libri, 1898 – edition of Publius Papinius Statius.
- Goethes Torquato Tasso, 1899 – Goethe's Torquato Tasso.
- Fl. Merobaudis reliquiae. Blossii Aemilii Dracontii Carmina. Eugenii Toletani episcopi Carmina et epistulae, 1905 (Flavius Merobaudes, Dracontius, Eugenius of Toledo In: Monumenta Germaniae Historica: Auctores antiquissimi XIV).
- Q. Horati Flacci Carmina, 1907-12 – editions of Horace.
- Poetae latini minores, 1910ff. (after Emil Baehrens'intervm recensvit).
- Inscriptiones Baivariae Romanae sive inscriptiones Prov. Raetiae adiectis aliquot Noricis Italicisque, 1915.
- Quinti Sereni Liber medicinalis, 1916 (Serenus Sammonicus In: Corpus Medicorum Latinorum II).
- Römische Metrik, 1923 In: Alfred Gercke, Eduard Norden: Einleitung in die Altertumswissenschaft – Roman metrics.
