= Idyll VII =

Poem by Theocritus

Idyll VII, also called θαλύσια ('Harvest Home'), is a bucolic poem by the 3rd-century BC Greek poet Theocritus. The dramatic persona, a poet, making his way through the noonday heat with two friends to a harvest feast, meets the goatherd, Lycidas. To humour the poet, Lycidas sings a love song of his own, and the other replies with verses about the passion of Aratus, the famous writer of didactic verse. After a courteous parting from Lycidas, the poet and his two friends repair to the orchard, where Demeter is being gratified with the first-fruits of harvest and vintaging.

== Summary ==
The poet tells in the first person how three friends went out from Cos to join in a harvest-home at a farm in the country. On the way, they overtake a Cretan goatherd named Lycidas, and the conversation leads to a friendly singing match between him and the narrator Simichidas. Lycidas' song, which was apparently composed the previous November, is primarily a song of good wishes for the safe passage of his beloved Ageanax to Mitylenè, but the greater part of it is concerned with the merrymaking that will celebrate his safe arrival and includes an address to the mythical goatherd-poet Comatas, whose story is to be sung by Tityrus on the festive occasion. Simichidas replies with a prayer to Pan and the Loves to bring the fair Philinus to his lover Aratus, a prayer that passes, however, into an appeal to Aratus to cease such youthful follies. Lycidas now bestows the crook which he had laughingly offered as a stake, and leaves the three friends at the entrance to the farm. The rest of the poem is a description of the feast.

== Analysis ==
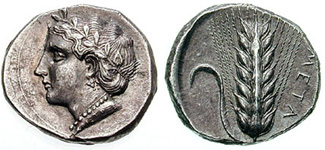
Stater of Metapontum: c. 375 BC. Wreathed head of Demeter (left); seven-grained barley ear (right).

The scholia preserve a tradition that Simichidas is Theocritus himself, and according to J. M. Edmonds, "there is great probability that we are dealing throughout the poem with real persons."

== See also ==
- Thalysia
- Lycidas
- Eclogue 9

== Sources ==
- Brown, Edwin L. (1981). "The Lycidas of Theocritus' Idyll 7". Harvard Studies in Classical Philology. 85: 59–100. doi:10.2307/311165. JSTOR 311165.

Attribution:

- Edmonds, J. M., ed. (1919). The Greek Bucolic Poets (3rd ed.). William Heinemann. pp. 91–107.
- Lang, Andrew, ed. (1880). Theocritus, Bion, and Moschus. London: Macmillan and Co. pp. 37–43.
