= Castello di Pereto =

Coordinates: 42.0600°N 13.1024°E

Castle of Pereto
- Castello di Pereto
- Pereto
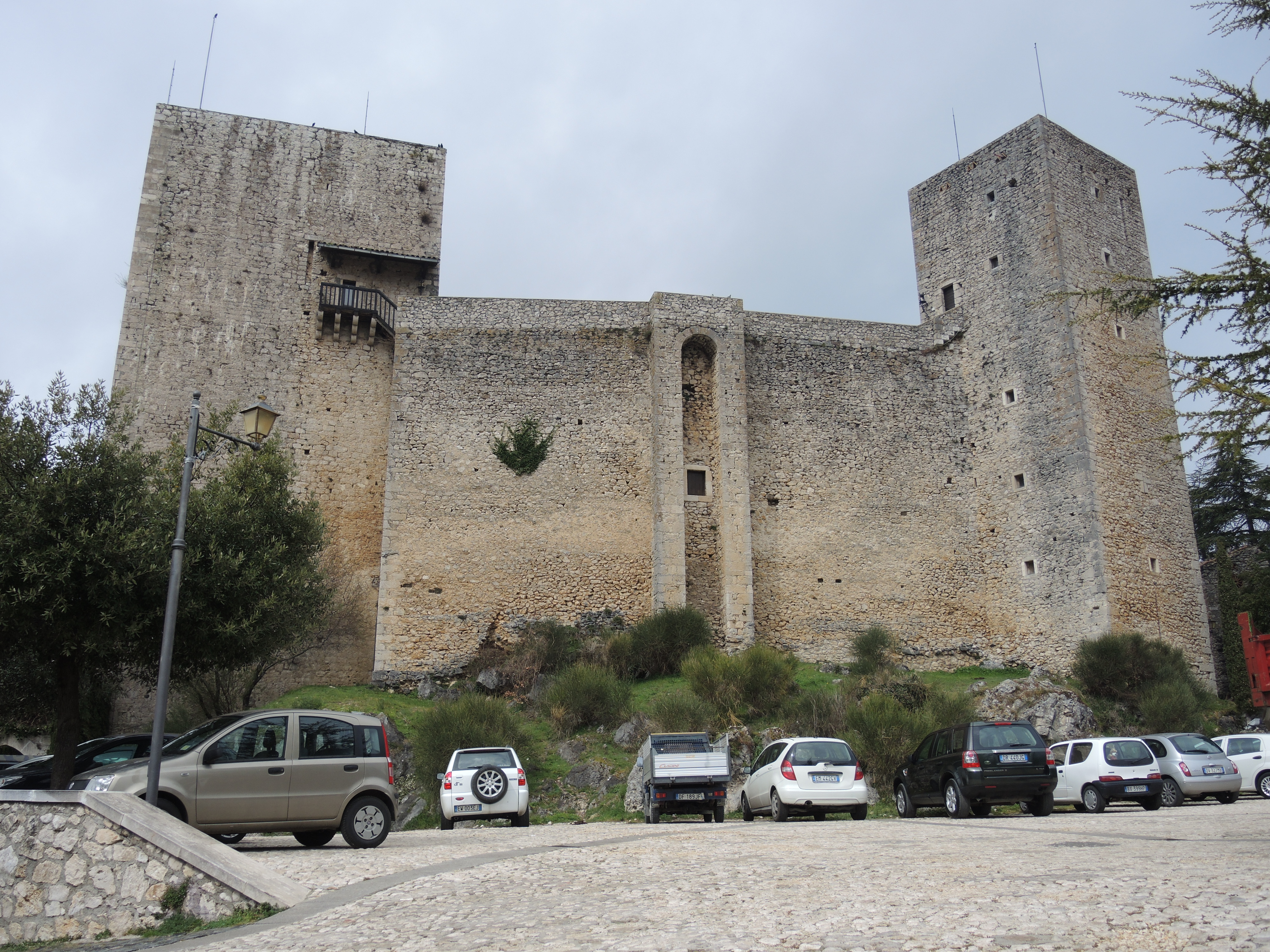
- Castle in Pereto

Site information
- Type: Castle

Location

Site history
- Built: 10th century

Castello di Pereto (Italian for Castle of Pereto) is a Middle Ages castle in Pereto, Province of L'Aquila (Abruzzo), Italy.

== History ==
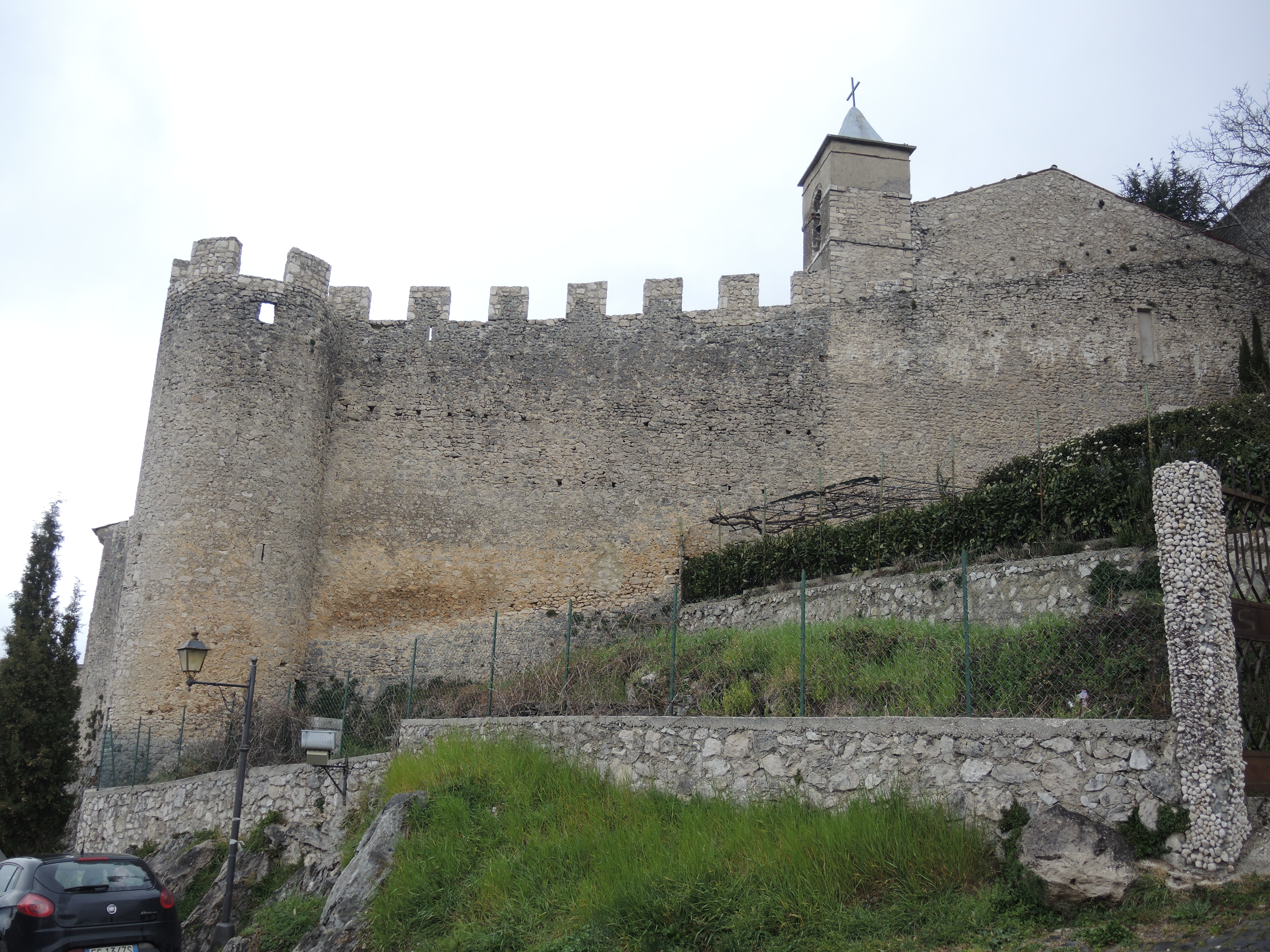
Castle walls

The castle of Pereto is strategically positioned to control the Piana del Cavaliere and the ancient Via Tiburtina Valeria. The oldest part of the structure is attributed to the proto-count Berardo of Marsi, who, in the first half of the 10th century, built a tower on the site where the castle's keep would later stand.

The structure was strengthened in the latter half of the 11th century when Pereto became the residence of Rainaldo, Count of Marsi. After Rainaldo left for the First Crusade in 1093 and subsequently died, his widow Aldegrima moved to Oricola and donated the castle of Pereto to the Abbey of Montecassino. In 1097, the castle is listed among the properties confirmed to Abbot Oderisio by a bull of Pope Urban II.

After a period of decline in 1150, the manor passed to the De Ponte lords and was expanded during the Frederican era. The addition of two other square towers and connecting walls in the 14th century gave rise to the castle-enclosure structure. At the beginning of the 15th century, the castle became the property of the Orsini family and was likely damaged by the 1456 Central Italy earthquakes on December 5, 1456.

Transferred to the Colonna family at the end of the 15th century, the north tower was used by the Maccafani family in the 19th century, who sold it to the Vicario family at the beginning of the 20th century. Severely damaged by the 1915 Avezzano earthquake, the castle was purchased in 1966 by Aldo Maria Arena, who oversaw its restoration, receiving a diploma of merit from Europa Nostra in 1982 for the success and quality of the work done.

The structure is open to visitors.

== Architecture ==
The keep has a square plan with 11.70 meters per side and is 27 meters high. It is built on four floors, which housed the guardhouse, storerooms, and prisons on the ground floor. The first floor served as the justice hall, while the noble residence was on the second and third floors. The top floor was used for watch and defense.

The second tower, located to the north, has a side length of 6.60 meters and a height of 24 meters; internally, it is structured on five floors. The third tower, to the southeast, has a height of 16 meters and a side length of 4.60 meters; it has no floors and likely served only as a connecting point between the walls and as a lookout.

The southwest walls are 23 meters long and 15 meters high. Near the keep is the main entrance to the castle. The eastern walls are 24.5 meters long and 13 meters high, while the northern walls are 22.40 meters long and 14 meters high. At the top, the walls have a patrol walkway connecting the towers.
