= Franz Ritter =

German classical philologist

Franz Ritter (15 February 1803, Medebach – 22 October 1875, Bonn) was a German classical philologist.

He studied classical philology at the universities of Bonn and Berlin, receiving his doctorate in 1828 with a dissertation on Aristophanes' Plutus. In 1829 he obtained his habilitation at the University of Bonn, where in 1833 he was named an associate professor of classical philology.

He published the entire edition of works by Horace (1856–57) as well as three complete editions of Tacitus (1834–36, 1848 and 1856–57). He also edited works by Tertullian, Terence, Aristotle and Sophocles.

== Selected works ==
- Elementorum grammaticae latinae libri duo, (1831).
- Poetica, (1839); edition of Aristotle's Poetics.
- Didymus Chalcenteri opuscula (1845), edition of Didymus Chalcenterus.
- Cornelii Taciti Opera, (1848); edition of Tacitus.
- Q. Horativs Flaccvs Ad codices saecvli noni decimique exactvm commentario critico et exegetico, (two volumes, 1856–57); edition of Horace.
- Sophokles' König Oidipus, (1870); Sophocles' Oedipus Rex.
