= Gaius Maecenas =

Roman political advisor (d. 8 BCE)

Gaius Cilnius Maecenas
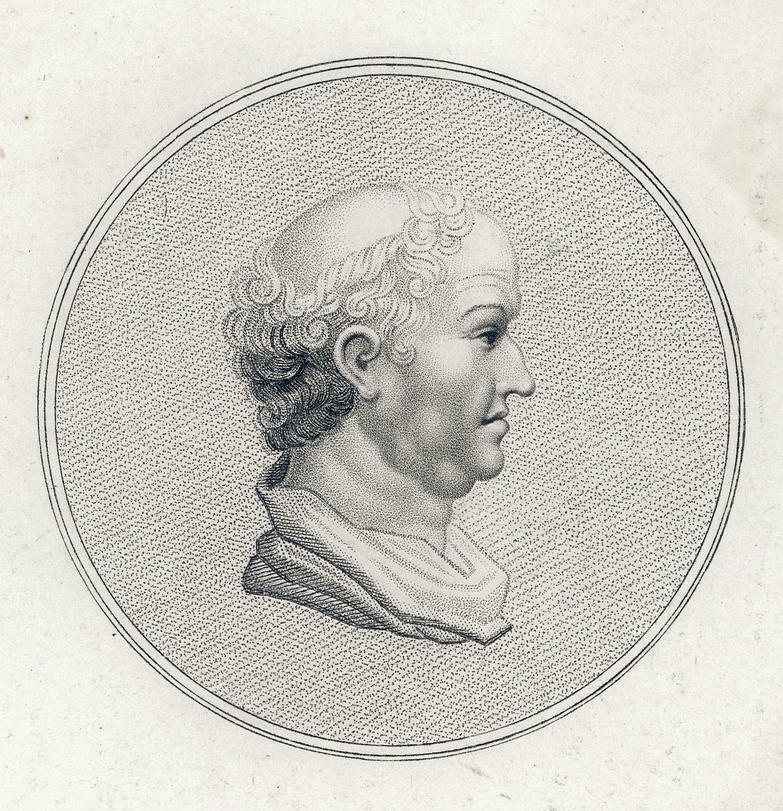
- Imaginary portrait engraving (18th century)
- Born: 13 April 68 BC
- Died: 8 BC (age 59-60)
- Years active: 40–8 BC
- Known for: Friend and political advisor to Octavian, patron of the arts, Gardens of Maecenas
- Spouse: Terentia

Gaius Cilnius Maecenas ([ˈɡaːiʊs̠ ˈkɪɫ̪niʊs̠ mae̯ˈkeːnaːs̠] 13 April 68 BC – 8 BC) was a friend and political advisor to Octavian (who later reigned as emperor Augustus). He was also an important patron for the new generation of Augustan poets, including both Horace and Virgil. In many languages, his name is an eponym for "patron of arts".

During the reign of Augustus, Maecenas served as a quasi-culture minister to the Roman emperor but in spite of his wealth and power he chose not to enter the Senate, remaining of equestrian rank.

== Life ==
Expressions in Propertius seem to imply that Maecenas had taken some part in the campaigns of Mutina, Philippi, and Perugia. He prided himself on his ancient Etruscan lineage, and claimed descent from the princely house of the Cilnii, who excited the jealousy of their townsmen by their preponderant wealth and influence at Arretium in the 4th century BC. Horace makes reference to this in his address to Maecenas at the opening of his first books of Odes with the expression "atavis edite regibus" (descendant of kings). Tacitus refers to him as "Cilnius Maecenas"; it is possible that "Cilnius" was his mother's nomen – or that Maecenas was in fact a cognomen.

The Gaius Maecenas mentioned in Cicero as an influential member of the equestrian order in 91 BC may have been his grandfather, or even his father. The testimony of Horace and Maecenas's own literary tastes imply that he had profited from the highest education of his time.

His great wealth may have been in part hereditary, but he owed his position and influence to his close connection with the emperor Augustus. He first appears in history in 40 BC, when he was employed by Octavian in arranging his marriage with Scribonia, and afterwards in assisting to negotiate the Treaty of Brundisium and the reconciliation with Mark Antony. As a close friend and advisor he had even acted as deputy for Augustus when he was abroad.

It was in 38 BC that Horace was introduced to Maecenas, who had before this received Lucius Varius Rufus and Virgil into his intimacy. In the "Journey to Brundisium", in 37, Maecenas and Marcus Cocceius Nerva – great-grandfather of the future emperor Nerva – are described as having been sent on an important mission, and they were successful in patching up, by the Treaty of Tarentum, a reconciliation between the two claimants for supreme power. During the Sicilian war against Sextus Pompeius in 36, Maecenas was sent back to Rome, and was entrusted with supreme administrative control in the city and in Italy. He was vicegerent of Octavian during the campaign that led to the Battle of Actium, when, with great promptness and secrecy, he crushed the conspiracy of Lepidus the Younger; during the subsequent absences of his chief in the provinces he again held the same position.

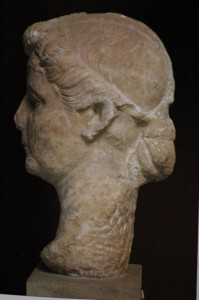
Bust of Maecenas' wife Terentia (1st century BC)

During the latter years of his life as recorded by Suetonius he fell somewhat out of favour with his master. The historian attributes the loss of the imperial favour to Maecenas' having indiscreetly revealed to Terentia, his allegedly beautiful but difficult wife, the discovery of the conspiracy in which her brother Lucius Licinius Varro Murena was implicated, but according to Cassius Dio (writing in the early 3rd century AD) it was due to the emperor's relations with Terentia. Maecenas died in 8 BC, leaving the emperor sole heir to his wealth.

== Reputation ==
Opinions were much divided in ancient times as to his personal character; but the testimony as to his administrative and diplomatic ability was unanimous. He enjoyed the credit of sharing largely in the establishment of the new order of things, of reconciling parties, and of carrying the new empire safely through many dangers. To his influence especially were attributed the more humane policies of Octavian after his first alliance with Antony and Lepidus.

The best summary of his character as a man and a statesman, by Velleius Paterculus, describes him as "of sleepless vigilance in critical emergencies, far-seeing and knowing how to act, but in his relaxation from business more luxurious and effeminate than a woman." Expressions in the Odes of Horace seem to imply that Maecenas was deficient in the robustness of fibre which Romans liked to imagine was characteristic of their city.

== Maecenate (patronage) ==
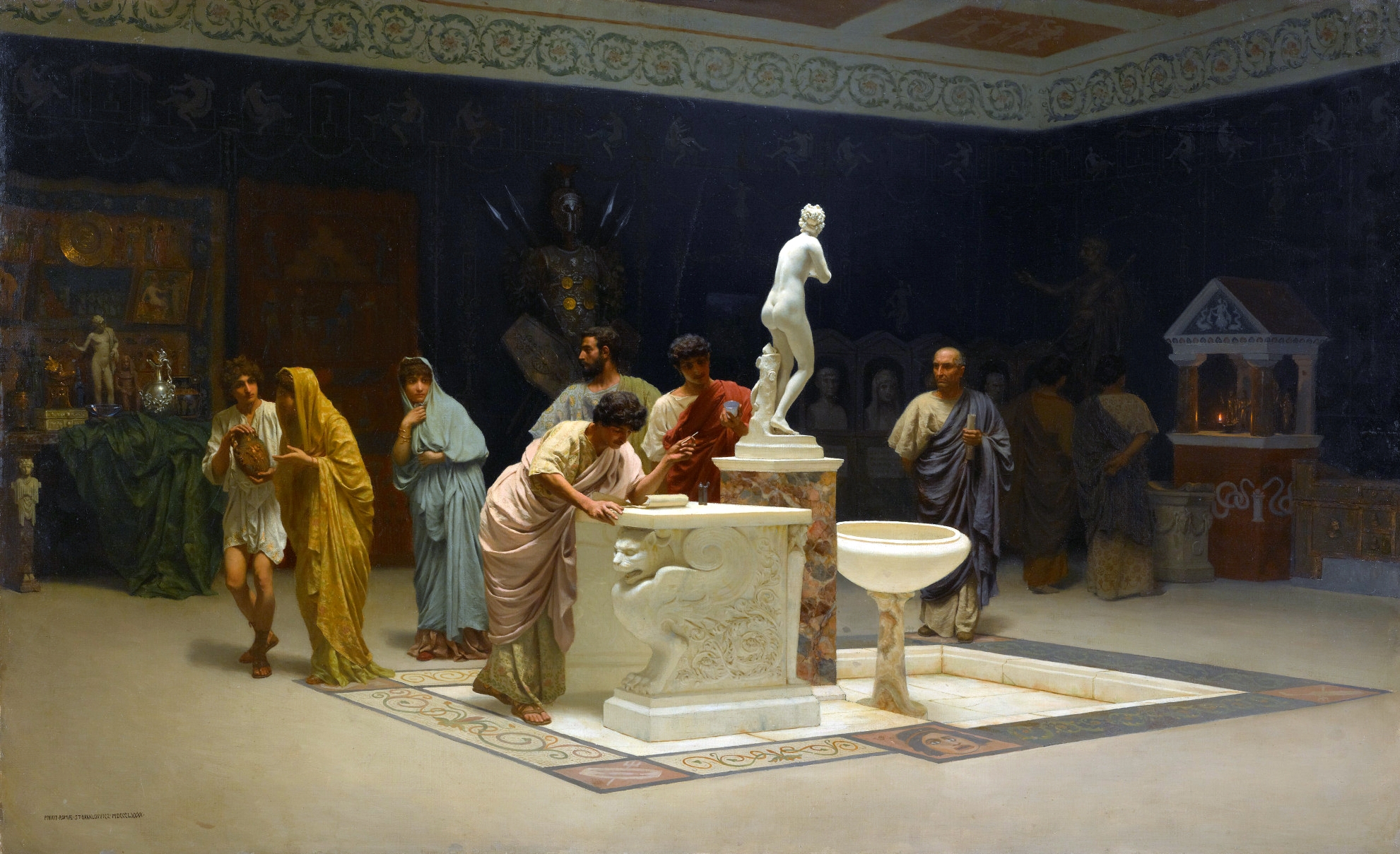
Stefan Bakałowicz: At Maecenas' Reception Room, 1890

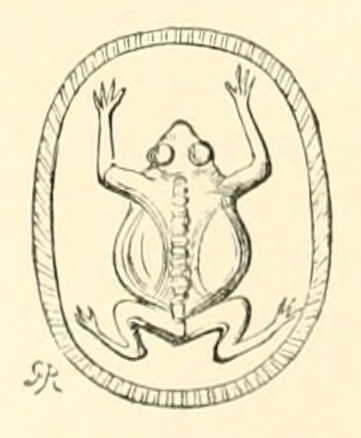
Frog on an engraved gem: the seal-device of Mecaenas.

Maecenas is most famous for his support of young poets; hence, in most European languages, his name has become an eponym for "patron of arts": in French, mécène; in Italian, mecenate; in Spanish, mecenas; in German, Mäzen; in Polish, mecenas; in Czech, mecenáš; in Hungarian, mecénás; in Ukrainian, Russian, and Bulgarian, меценат. The eponym has been in use since at least the composition of Laus Pisonis ("Praise of Piso") by an unknown author in the first century AD. Edmund Spenser's shepherds complain that there is no "Mecoenas" in England in the 1570s.

Maecenas supported Virgil, who wrote the Georgics in his honour. It was Virgil, impressed with examples of Horace's poetry, who introduced Horace to Maecenas. Indeed, Horace begins the first poem of his Odes (Odes I.i) by addressing his new patron. Maecenas gave him full financial support as well as an estate in the Sabine Mountains. Propertius and the minor poets Varius Rufus, Plotius Tucca, Valgius Rufus, and Domitius Marsus also were his protégés.

His character as a munificent patron of literature – which has made his name a household word – is gratefully acknowledged by the recipients of it and attested by the regrets of the men of letters of a later age, expressed by Martial and Juvenal. His patronage was exercised, not from vanity or a mere dilettante love of letters, but with a view to the higher interest of the state. He recognized in the genius of the poets of that time not only the truest ornament of the court, but the power of reconciling men's minds to the new order of things, and of investing the actual state of affairs with an ideal glory and majesty. The change in seriousness of purpose between the Eclogues and the Georgics of Virgil was in a great measure the result of the direction given by the statesman to the poet's genius. A similar change between the earlier odes of Horace, in which he declares his epicurean indifference to affairs of state, and the great national odes of the third book has been ascribed by some to the same guidance. However, since the organization of the Odes is not entirely chronological, and their composition followed both books of Satires and the Epodes, this argument is plainly specious; but doubtless the milieu of Maecenas's circle influenced the writing of the Roman Odes (III.1–6) and others such as the ode to Pollio, Motum ex Metello (II.1).

Maecenas endeavoured also to divert the less masculine genius of Propertius from harping continually on his love to themes of public interest, an effort which to some extent backfired in the ironic elegies of Book III. But if the motive of his patronage had been merely political, it never could have inspired the affection which it did in its recipients. The great charm of Maecenas in his relation to the men of genius who formed his circle was his simplicity, cordiality and sincerity. Although not particular in the choice of some of the associates of his pleasures, he admitted none but men of worth to his intimacy, and when once admitted they were treated like equals. Much of the wisdom of Maecenas probably lives in the Satires and Epistles of Horace. It has fallen to the lot of no other patron of literature to have his name associated with works of such lasting interest as the Georgics of Virgil, the first three books of Horace's Odes, and the first book of his Epistles.

Two poems in the Appendix Vergiliana are elegies to him. Virgil cannot have written them, as he died eleven years before Maecenas; they may have been written by Albinovanus Pedo.

== Works ==
Maecenas also wrote literature himself in both prose and verse, which are now lost literary work. The some twenty fragments that remain show that he was less successful as an author than as a judge and patron of literature.

His prose works on various subjects – Prometheus, dialogues like Symposium (a banquet at which Virgil, Horace, and Messalla were present), De cultu suo (on his manner of life), and a poem In Octaviam ("Against Octavia") of which the content is unclear – were ridiculed by Augustus, Seneca, and Quintilian for their strange style, the use of rare words and awkward transpositions.

According to Dio Cassius, Maecenas was also the inventor of a system of shorthand.

== Gardens of Maecenas ==
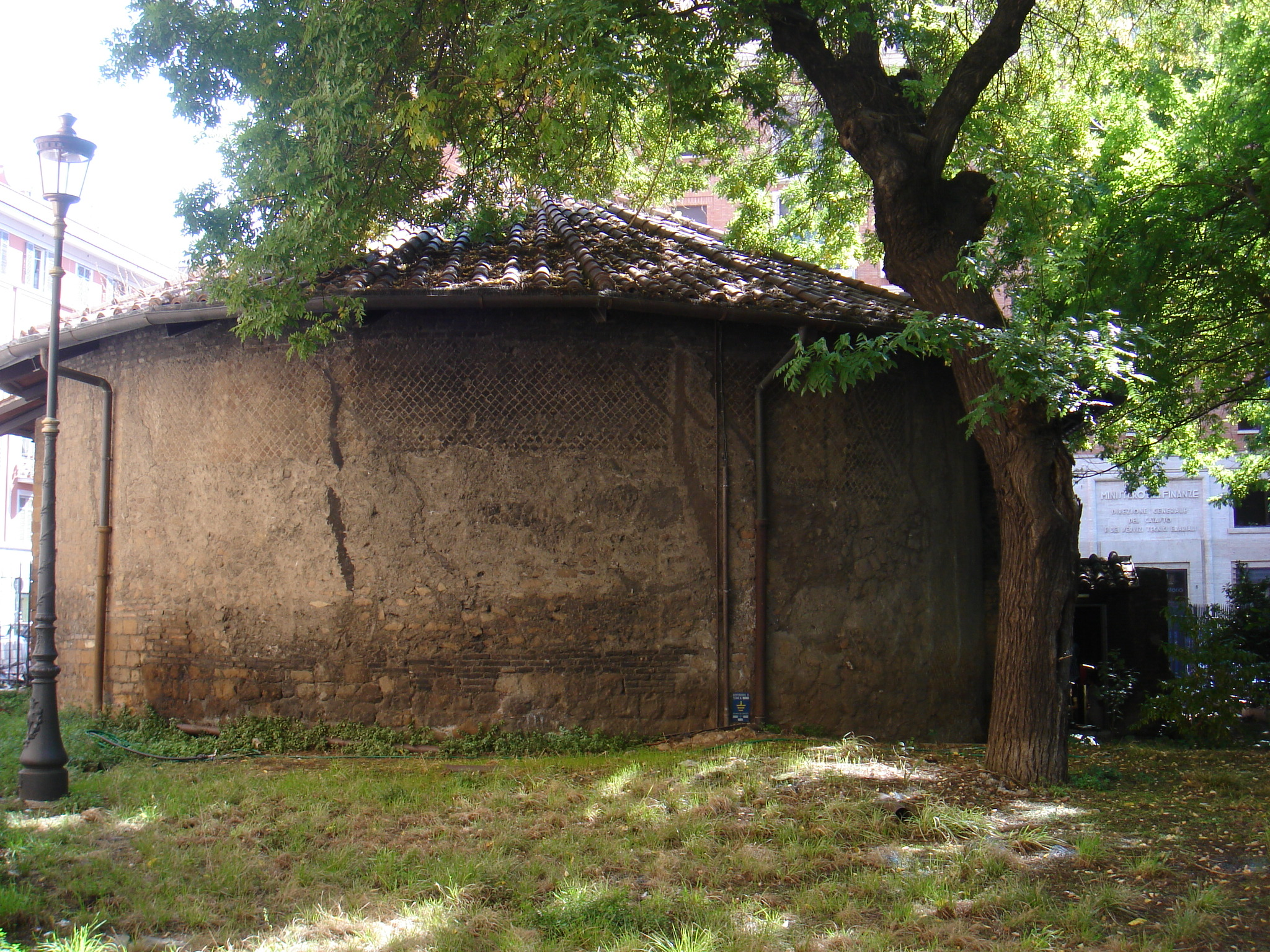
Auditorium of Maecenas, Esquiline

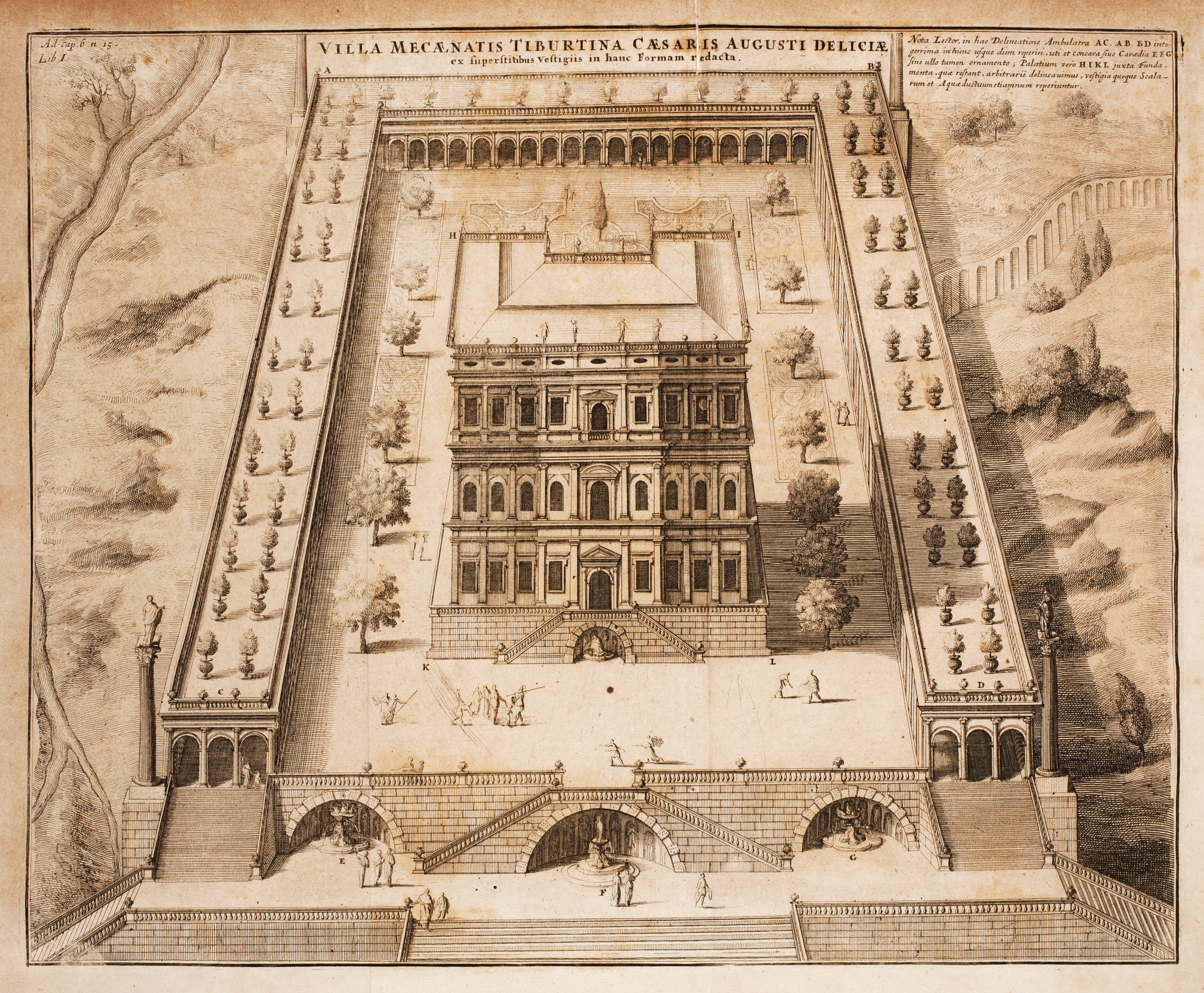
Reconstruction of the Villa Maecenas in Tivoli, Italy, 1713

Maecenas sited his famous gardens, the first gardens of the Hellenistic-Persian garden style in Rome, on the Esquiline Hill, atop the Servian Wall and its adjoining necropolis, near the gardens of Lamia. It contained terraces, libraries, and other aspects of Roman culture. Maecenas is said to have been the first to construct a swimming bath of hot water in Rome, which may have been in the gardens. The luxury of his gardens and villas incurred the displeasure of Seneca the Younger.

Though the approximate site is known, it is not easy to reconcile literary indications to determine the gardens' exact location, whether or not they lay on both sides of the Servian ager and both north and south of the porta Esquilina. Common graves of the archaic Esquiline necropolis have been found near the north-west corner of the modern Piazza Vittorio Emanuele, that is, outside the Esquiline gate of antiquity and north of the via Tiburtina vetus; most probably the horti Maecenatiani extended north from this gate and road on both sides of the ager. The "Auditorium of Maecenas", a probable venue for dining and entertainment, may still be visited (upon reservation) on Largo Leopardi near Via Merulana.

The gardens became imperial property after Maecenas's death, and Tiberius lived there after his return to Rome in 2 AD. Nero connected them with the Palatine Hill via his Domus Transitoria, and viewed the burning of that from the turris Maecenatiana. This turris was probably the "molem propinquam nubibus arduis" ("the pile, among the clouds") mentioned by Horace.

Whether the horti Maecenatiani bought by Fronto actually were the former gardens of Maecenas is unknown, and the domus Frontoniana mentioned in the twelfth century by Magister Gregorius may also refer to the gardens of Maecenas.

== Legacy ==
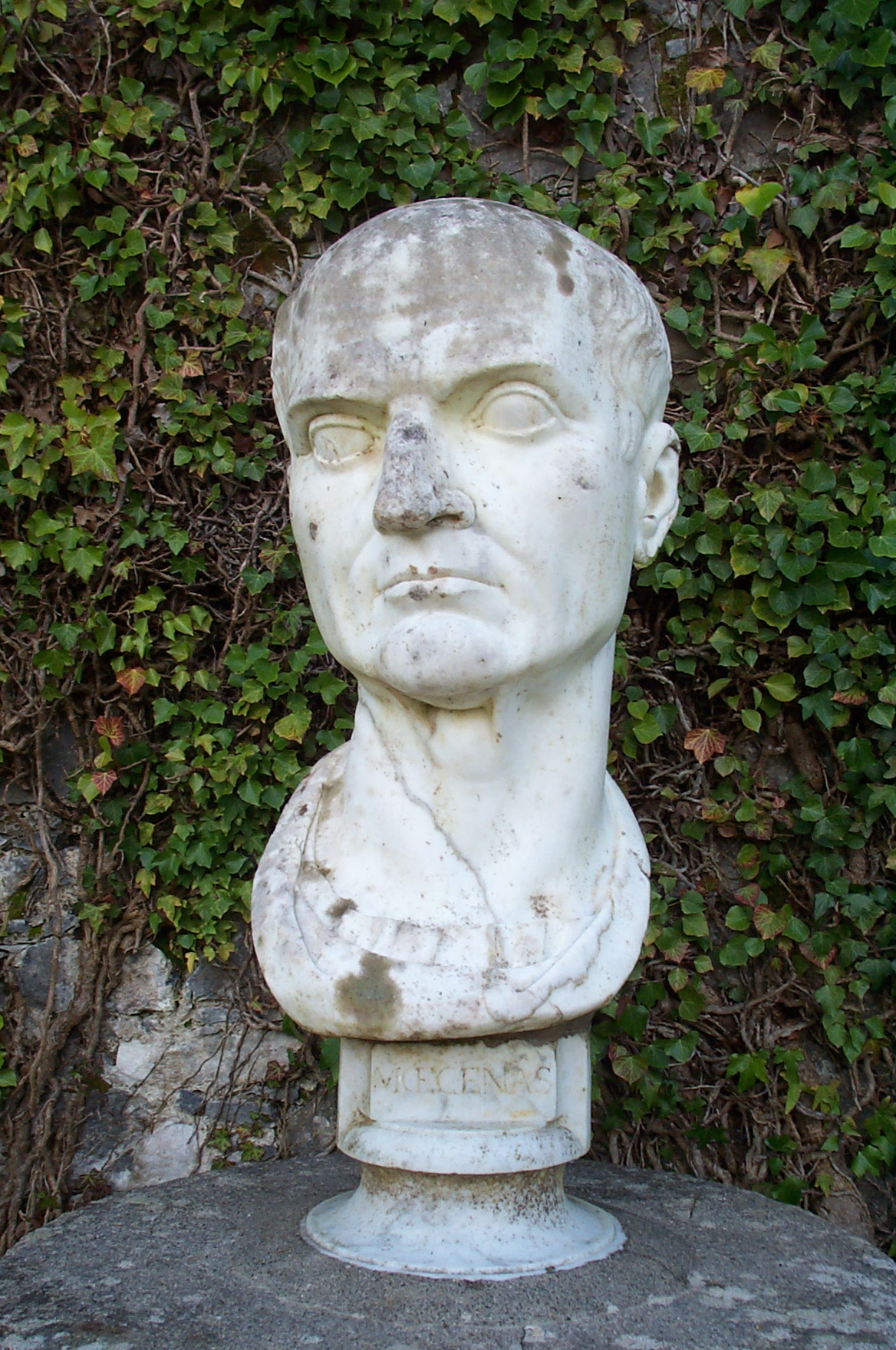
Bust of Maecenas at Coole Park, Ireland

His name has become a byword in many languages for a well-connected and wealthy patron. For instance, John Dewey, in his lectures Art as Experience, said: "Economic patronage by wealthy and powerful individuals has at many times played a part in the encouragement of artistic production. Probably many a savage tribe had its Maecenas." Maecenas is celebrated for this role in two poems, the Elegiae in Maecenatem, which were written after his death and collected in the Appendix Vergiliana.

In various languages, Maecenas' name has given rise to a word for private patronage, mainly cultural but sometimes wider, usually perceived as more altruistic than sponsorship. A verse of the Latin-language student song Gaudeamus igitur wishes longevity upon the charity of the students' benefactors ("Maecenatum", genitive plural of "Maecenas").

Phillis Wheatley, the 18th-century poet and the first African-American writer to publish a book, published a poem "To Maecenas" as the first poem in her 1773 book Poems on Various subjects, Religious and Moral.

In Poland and Western Ukraine, a lawyer would customarily be addressed with the honorific Pan Mecenas.

In F. Scott Fitzgerald's novel The Great Gatsby, Maecenas is one of the three famous wealthy men, along with Midas and J. P. Morgan, whose secrets the novel's narrator Nick Carraway hopes to find in the books he buys for his home library.

== In other media ==
Maecenas is a supporting character in William Shakespeare's play Antony and Cleopatra, in which he is presented as a level-headed and loyal lieutenant to Octavian; Enobarbus describes him as 'half the heart of Caesar'. Maecenas was portrayed by Alex Wyndham in the second season of the 2005 HBO television series Rome. He was portrayed by Russell Barr in the made-for-TV movie Imperium: Augustus. He is also featured in one episode of the second series of Plebs on ITV. In the 2021 TV series Domina, he was portrayed by Youssef Kerkour.

== See also ==
- Cilnia gens
- Maecenas-Ehrung, German Award to philanthropists
