= Plotius Tucca =

Plotius Tucca (fl. 35 B.C.E) was a Roman poet and close friend of Virgil. Together with Varius Rufus, he was tasked by Augustus with the editing and publication of the Aeneid.

Aside from notices found in secondary texts, little is known about Tucca's life. German philologist Jonathan Augustus Weichert compiles some speculative evidence for his origins and name. Citing the French classical scholar Joseph Justus Scaliger, Weichert claims that Plotius, like Virgil, was born in the Roman province of Cisalpine Gaul. He continues to add that the cognomen Tucca might have originally been transmitted as Tuceta, a reference to a type of Gallic sausage (tūcētum), drawing upon a notice found in the work of Isaac Casaubon.

Horace and the grammatical commentators Donatus and Servius provide some of the only concrete evidence for Tucca's later life and career. In one of his Satires, Horace implies that Tucca was a client of the influential Roman aristocrat Maecenas, and he places him in a literary circle that included Varius Rufus, Valgius Rufus, and Virgil himself. In the introduction to his commentary on the Aeneid, Servius details the role Tucca played in the work's eventual publication. He writes that Augustus, fearing that the Aeneid would be lost, charged Varius and Tucca with "emending" the text. The two were instructed to trim superfluous text but add nothing, which resulted in versiculi ("half-verses") being scattered throughout the Aeneid.
