= Wilhelm Baehrens =

German classical scholar (1885-1929)

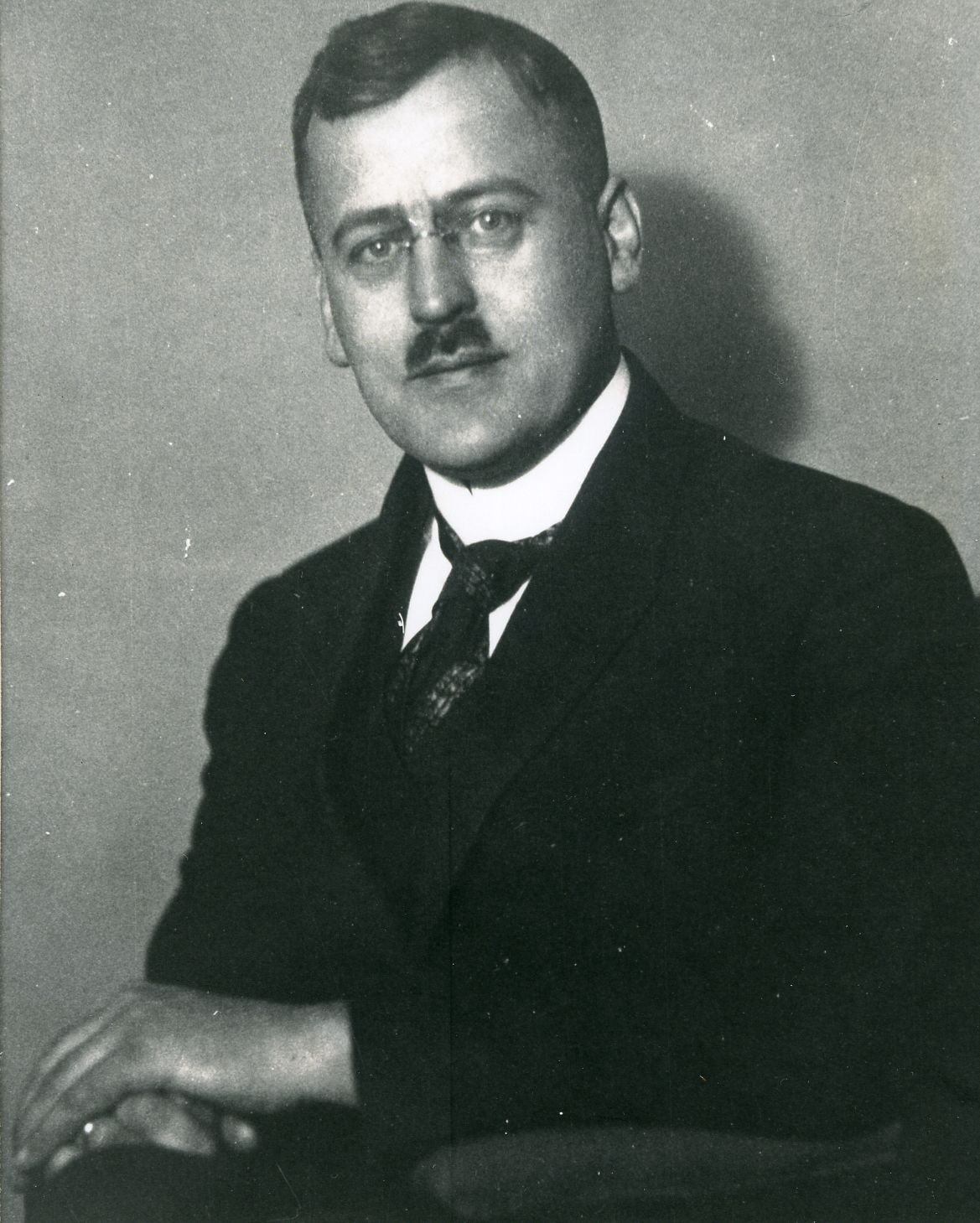
Wilhelm Baehrens

Wilhelm Adolf Baehrens (3 September 1885 – 23 January 1929) was a German classical scholar.

The son of professor Emil Baehrens (1848–1888), Wilhelm Baehrens was born in Groningen. After visiting the local gymnasium he followed in his early deceased father's footsteps by studying philology and papyrology at the University of Groningen. He also spent a few semesters at Halle, Göttingen and Berlin. In 1910 Baehrens received his doctor's degree at Groningen with his dissertation Panegyricorum latinorum editionis novae praefatio maior accedit Plinii panegyricus. For two years he acted as assistant schoolmaster at the Groningen gymnasium, until in 1912 he published his Beiträge zur lateinischen Syntax. In 1913 the Bavarian Academy of Sciences and Humanities entrusted him with the publication of the Latin homilies by Origen. The next three years Baehrens travelled to Italy, France and Germany collating manuscripts. The University of Groningen therefore awarded him venia legendi in 1915 and in 1916 Baehrens was appointed ordinary professor at the University of Ghent by the German occupation government in Belgium.

After the defeat of Germany in World War I and the termination of the German occupation of Belgium, Baehrens was expelled from Ghent as a collaborator in 1919. Because of the Halle professor Georg Wissowa, he habilitated there in May 1919 and was appointed professor-extraordinary in 1920. In 1922 he was appointed ordinary professor at the University of Göttingen, where he worked until his death in 1929. His edition of the works of Origen was published from 1920 to 1925; another edition of Fulgentius' works was not completed.
