= Pereto =

- Comune
- Comune di Pereto
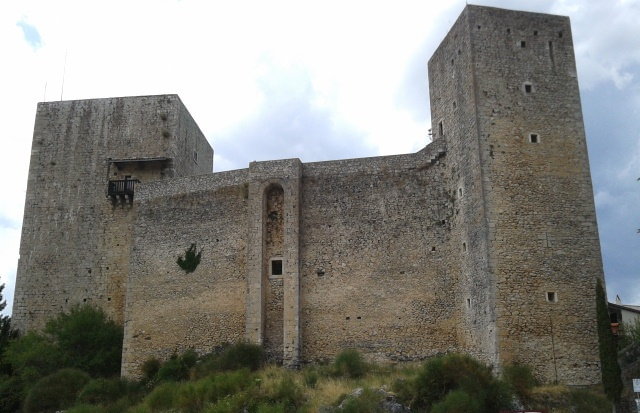
- Medieval castle in Pereto

- Location within Italy Location within Abruzzo
- Coordinates: 42°02′36″N 13°06′08″E
- Country: Italy
- Region: Abruzzo
- Province: L'Aquila (AQ)

Area
  - Total: 41.05 km^{2} (15.85 sq mi)
- Elevation: 800 m (2,600 ft)

Population (2005)
  - Total: 721
  - Density: 17.6/km^{2} (45.5/sq mi)
- Demonym: Peretani
- Time zone: UTC+1 (CET)
  - Summer (DST): UTC+2 (CEST)
- Postal code: 67064
- Dialing code: 0863
- Patron saint: St. George
- Saint day: 23 April

Pereto (Marsicano: Pirìtu) is a comune and town in the province of L'Aquila in the Abruzzo region of Italy.

It was an ancient centre of the Marsi.

== Main sights ==
- Medieval castle, with its 13th-century imposing towers, which belonged to the Colonna family from the late 15th century.
- Sanctuary of Madonna dei Bisognosi: According to the local tradition, it was erected in 608 AD. It houses some notable late-15th-century frescoes and a Crucifix carried here by Pope Boniface IV for the church's consecration.

Outside the hamlet is the Church of Santa Maria in Cellis (1132).
