= Lucius Varius Rufus =

Roman poet

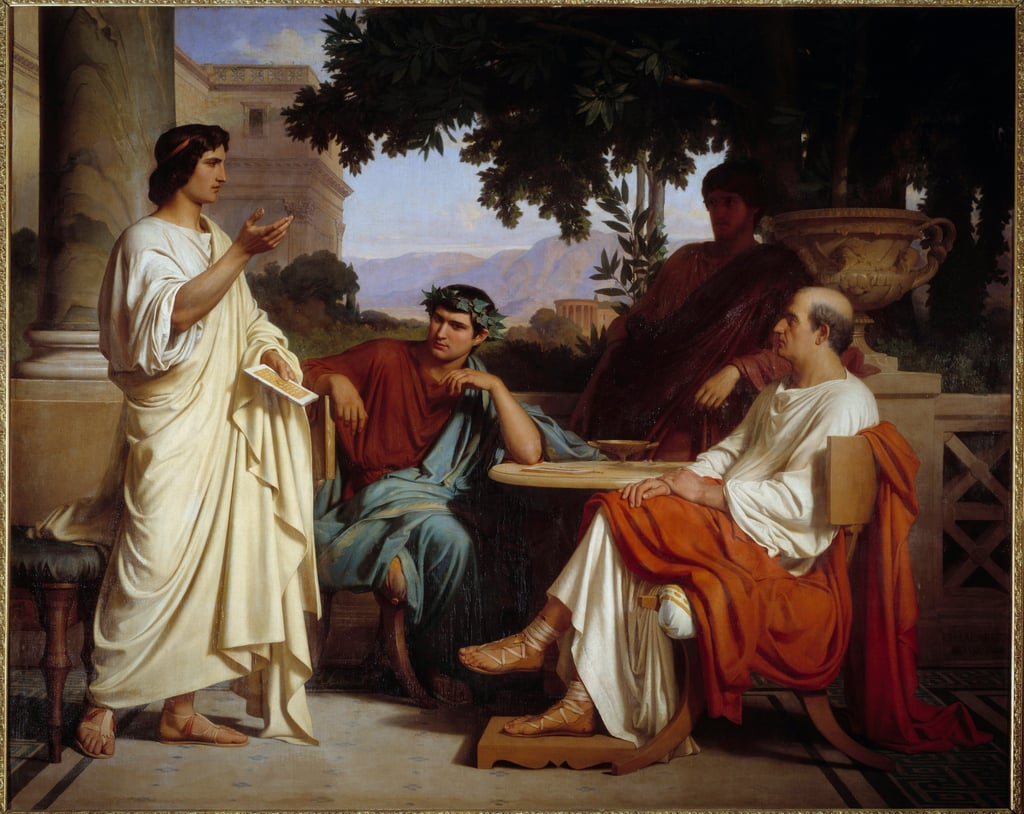
- Horace, Virgil and Varius at the house of Maecenas l.t.r. Virgil, Horace, Rufus (in the background) and Gaius Maecenas. Painting by Charles Jalabert (ca. 1846)
- Born: c. 74 BC
- Died: 14 BC (aged about 60)
- Occupation: Poet
- Writing career
- Language: Latin
- Period: Augustan poetry
- Notable work: Thyestes, De Morte

Lucius Varius Rufus (/ˈvɛəriəs, ˈvær-/; c. 74 – 14 BC) was a Roman poet of the early Augustan age.

He was a friend of Virgil, after whose death he and Plotius Tucca prepared the Aeneid for publication, and of Horace, for whom he and Virgil obtained an introduction to Maecenas. Horace spoke of him as a master of epic and the only poet capable of celebrating the achievements of Vipsanius Agrippa (Odes, i.6); Virgil (under the name of Lycidas, Ecl. ix.35) regretted that he had hitherto produced nothing comparable to the work of Varius or Helvius Cinna.

Macrobius (Saturnalia, vi. I, 39; 2, 19) states that Varius composed an epic poem De Morte, some lines of which are quoted as having been imitated or appropriated by Virgil; Horace (Sat. i.10, 43) probably alluded to another epic, and, according to the scholiast on Epistles, i.16, 2 729, these three lines were taken bodily from a panegyric of Varius on Augustus.

Varius's most famous literary production was the tragedy Thyestes, which Quintilian (Inst. Orat. x.1, 98) declared fit to rank with any of the Greek tragedies. A didascalia on the play, preserved in a Paris manuscript, states that it was produced at the games celebrated in 29 BC by Octavian in honour of the victory at Actium, and that Varius received a present of a million sesterces from the Roman ruler.

Fragments of Varius's works are located in E. Bahrens, Frag. Poetarum Romanorum (1886); monographs by A. Weichert (1836) and R. Unger (1870, 1878, 1898); Martin Schanz, Geschichte der römischen Litteratur (1899), ii.1; Teuffel, Hist. of Roman Literature (Eng. trans., 1900), 223.
