= Emil Baehrens =

German classical scholar (1848-1888)

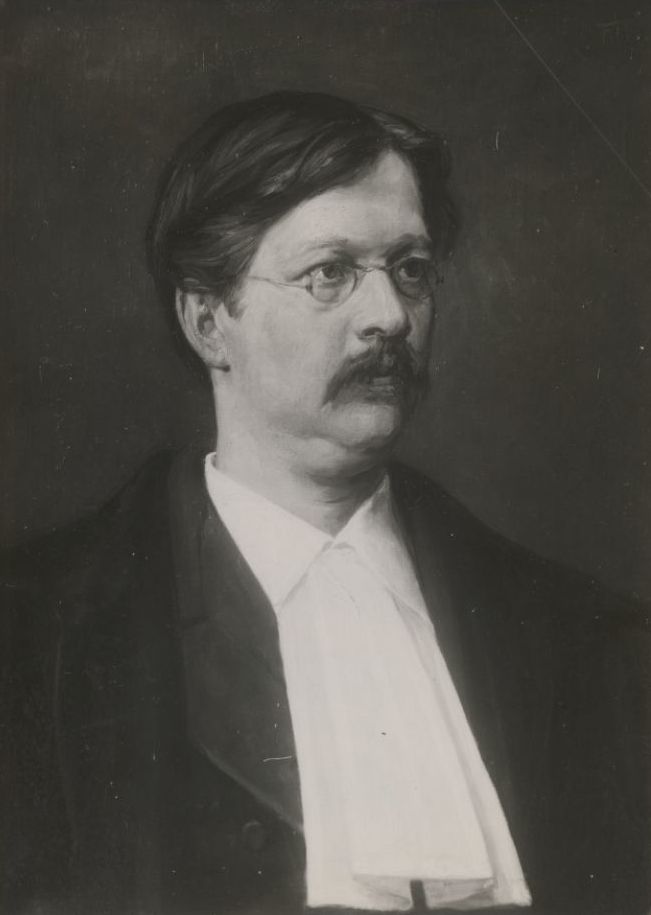
- Born: Paul Heinrich Emil Baehrens; 24 September 1848; Cologne, Rhine Province, German Confederation
- Died: 26 September 1888 (aged 40); Groningen, Netherlands

Academic background
- Education: University of Bonn

Academic work
- Institutions: University of Groningen
- Notable works: Poetae Latini minores (1879–1883)

Paul Heinrich Emil Baehrens (24 September 1848, in Bayenthal – 26 September 1888, in Groningen) was a German classical scholar.

After completing his studies he became Privatdozent at Jena. In 1877 he was appointed ordinary professor at the University of Groningen. He published editions of many Latin authors, including Catullus, Propertius and minor poets.

His son Wilhelm Baehrens also became a classical scholar.

== Life ==
Baehrens was the son of Paul Baehrens, a businessman, and his wife Maria (née Hagen). After the death of his father (1850), his mother married Dr. G. A. Hesse, who became like a second father to Baehrens. He was originally supposed to become a businessman, but in accordance with his aptitude Baehrens attended the Friedrich-Wilhelm-Gymnasium in Cologne. And after his final exam, he began his studies in classical philology at the Rheinische Friedrich-Wilhelms-Universität Bonn. His teachers included Jacob Bernays, Franz Bücheler, Friedrich Heimsoeth, Joseph Klein, August Reifferscheid, Franz Ritter, and Anton Springer. Most influential on Baehrens was Lucian Müller, as well as Otto Jahn and Hermann Usener, who gave him metrical and paleographical exercises, which brought him in 1868 to the Philological Seminar. In 1870 Baehrens took the "Oberlehrerexamen" and earned his doctorate. From 1871 to 1872 he deepened his studies at the University of Leipzig with the critic Friedrich Ritschl. Finally, he undertook his first educational trip, where he saw antique manuscripts in Munich, Milan, Bologna, Pisa, Venice, Florence, Lucca, Siena, Rome, and Naples. In Rome he stayed six months at the Deutsches Archaeologisches Institut, where he gained many contacts.

After his return in the autumn of 1873 Baehrens qualified as a professor at the Friedrich-Schiller-Universität Jena with the article "De Sulpiciae quae vocatur satira, commentatio philologica". In the following years he took further research trips: from January to April 1874 he visited the libraries of Löwen, Brüssel, and Paris, and from March to August 1875, Paris, London, and Oxford. In the summer semester of 1877 he was given the position of professor, and spent several years as a professor at the University of Groningen In the next eleven years he held many lectures and visited the library in London once again. In Groningen he married the daughter of his colleague Willem Hecker, a professor of history. On 26 September he succumbed to an abscess of the brain after 26 days. One of his three surviving children, Wilhelm Baehrens, became a classical philologist.

During his research, Emil Baehrens brought forth many important editions of different Latin authors, including Catullus ("Catulli Veronensis liber", 1876, with a large commentary published as second volume in 1885), "Panegyrici Latini", Gaius Valerius Flaccus ("C. Valeri Flacci Setini Balbi Argonauticon libri octo"), Publius Papinius Statius ("Silvae"), Tibullus ("Tibullinische Blätter"), Sextus Propertius, Horace ("Lectiones Hortianae"), Tacitus ("Dialogus de oratoribus"), and Minucius Felix ("Octavius").

His greatest undertaking were the "Poetae Latini minores", which from 1879 until 1883 appeared in five volumes from the publisher Teubner-Verlag. They were newly edited by Friedrich Karl Vollmer from 1910 until 1923. The first edition appeared in 1930 as a new adaptation by Willy Morel. As a continuation of the collection Baehrens published in 1886 through the Teubner-Verlag the "Fragmenta poetarum Romanorum", which are today separated from the "Fragmenta poetarum Latinorum" by Willy Morel, Karl Büchner, and Jürgen Blänsdorf.
