= Einsiedeln Eclogues =

Latin poems

The Einsiedeln Eclogues are two Latin pastoral poems, written in hexameters. They were discovered in a tenth century manuscript from Einsiedeln Abbey (codex Einsidlensis 266(E) pp 206–7) and first published in 1869, by H. Hagen.

The poems are generally considered to be incomplete fragments - although the reason for their incompleteness is disputed. As Hubbard explains, "some have explained it as a result of mechanical accident in the transmission, while others have thought the poems abbreviated by the poet himself to avoid giving offense to an ever more suspicious Nero".

== Authorship, date and place in the pastoral tradition ==
It is generally agreed that the poems post-date the Eclogues of Virgil. Since their publication, the poems have usually been dated to Neronian times (AD 54-68) (more specifically, the first fragment is sometimes dated to AD 64 or 65) in which case, they clearly pre-date the Eclogues of Nemesianus and may, or may not, pre-date the Eclogues of Calpurnius Siculus. However, Stover argues that the poems were written during the (probably later) 4th century AD.

The authorship of the poems is unknown. It is even disputed whether the two fragments were written by the same poet. Some scholars have proposed Calpurnius Siculus, Lucan or Calpurnius Piso as possible authors, however such attributions have not gained wide acceptance. More recently, Stover has expressed the view that author is likely to be Anicius Hermogenianus Olybrius (identifying the poems with the "Bucolicon Olibrii" referenced in a 15th-century copy of a 9th-century catalogue from Murbach).

== Synopses ==
=== Fragment I ===
The poem features three characters: Thamyras, Ladas and Midas.

Thamyras asks Midas to judge a song contest between him and Ladas: Midas agrees.

Ladas and Thamyras discuss whether the prize for the song contest should be a goat or a pipe, given by Faunus. Ladas says that he will win the prize, as he is minded to sing the praises of Caesar.

Ladas sings first. He invokes and sings about Apollo, alluding to the Oracle of Delphi, cosmology, the slaughter of the monster Python and Apollo’s musical skills.

Next Thamyras sings. He invokes the Muses, and sings that the riches of Helicon and an Apollo are here. He also invokes Troy, and sings that its fall was all worth it. The meaning is unclear, but it is usually interpreted to mean that a new poem has been written about Troy (possibly by Caesar himself). Thamyras sings of how Homer crowns Caesar with his own crown and Mantua tears up its writings.

=== Fragment II ===
The poem features two characters: Glyceranus and Mystes.

Glyceranus asks Mystes why he is being quiet. Mystes explains that it is because he is worried. Mystes explains that the source of his worries is over-abundance (satias). Glyceranus invites Mystes to tell him more, under the shade of an elm tree.

The remainder of the fragment consists of a monologue. Mystes describes a golden age - featuring a prosperous village, with worship, music, dancing and plentiful agricultural produce, without the threat of war and political crisis. He proceeds to tell of how crops grow from uncultivated land, the seas are not bothered by ships, tigers eat their young and lions submit to the yoke. He invokes the goddess Lucina.

== Commentary ==
=== General ===
Watson refers to the "incompetence and obscurity of the writing" of the poems. However, Hubbard writes that "whilst no one would contend that the Einsiedeln poet was a great master of Latin verse, the poems do exhibit a wide range of learning, as well as a certain imaginative energy and an independence that merit serious consideration in any account of the pastoral tradition"

Hubbard notes that "both poems ratchet up the terms of the encomium to a virtual breaking point at which credibility ceases" and that, in each Fragment, such hyperbole is reached through references/allusions to Virgil and his poetry such that "By problematizing Vergil as hyperbolic and not fully believable, the texts problematize the praise of Nero and thus ultimately their own authenticity, bracketed within frames of ironic self-distancing".

=== Fragment I ===
Several scholars consider that Thamyras' song refers to a poem about Troy that was written by the emperor Nero (which he supposedly recited, whilst Rome itself burned) and that the fragment is therefore purporting to praise Nero's poetry over and above that of Homer and Virgil (who was born in Mantua).

Watson notes that "two competing shepherds praise the emperor...in terms so extravagant that critics are undecided whether to regard the poem as botched panegyric, or as ironic and derisive". In this regard, Duff and Duff consider that the reference in Thamyras' song to Mantua tearing its writings to shreds demonstrates gross sycophancy to Nero, whereas some scholars consider that both Ladas' and Thamyras' songs allude to Lucan's encomium to Nero (from the prologue of Bellum Civile) and that, like Lucan's encomium, the extravagant praise of Nero may be construed ironically.

Exploring the allusions to Lucan further, Hubbard argues that the real object of the poet's awe is Lucan's literary technique - and that therefore (read alongside the fragment's challenges to the primacy of Homer and Virgil) Lucan is elevated to the status of the poet's primary model.

=== Fragment II ===
With its description of a Golden Age, Fragment II is clearly indebted to Virgil's Fourth (and Fifth) Eclogues. However, Hubbard notes that "the Einsiedeln poet avoids an overly close dependency and at times even goes out of his way to make clear his familiarity with Vergil's own sources". In particular, Hubbard explores Fragment II's allusions to Theocritus' encomium of Hieron (Theocritus Idyll 16) and to Aratus.

Hubbard notes that the later lines of the Fragment recall Virgilian sources more closely, but in fantastical, hyperbolic terms (e.g. the description of lions submitting to the yoke - possibly an allusion to Daphnis' yoking of tigers in Virgil's Fifth Eclogue): concluding that "this rhetorical excess must in some sense be what Mystes meant in worrying about satias".

== Editions and Translations ==
- Duff, J.W. and Duff, A.M. (1934) Minor Latin Poets (Vol 1) - Latin text with English translation (excerpted version available online).
- Korzeniewski, Dietmar (1971). Hirtengedichte aus neronischer Zeit. Titus Calpurnius Siculus und die Einsiedler Gedichte [Pastoral poems from the Neronian period. Titus Calpurnius Siculus and the Einsiedeln Poems]. Darmstadt: WBG, ISBN 3-534-04627-7 (critical edition, German translation and commentary).
- Amat, J. (1997) Consolation à Livie, Élégies à Mécène, Bucoliques d'Einsiedeln - Latin text with French translation and commentary.
