= Publio Fausto Andrelini =

Italian humanist poet (c. 1462 – 1518)

- Publio Fausto Andrelini
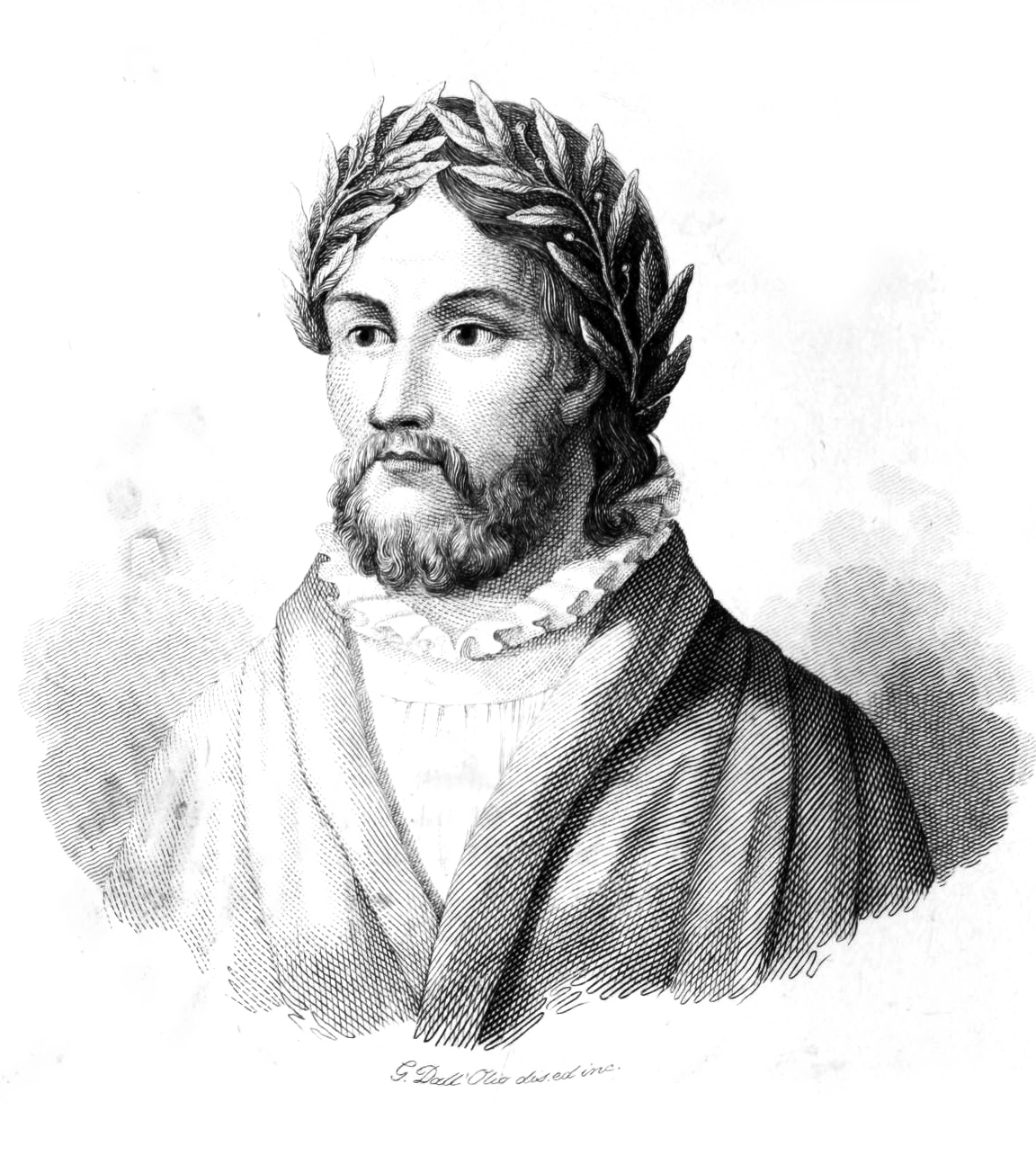
- Born: Publio Fausto Andrelini c. 1462; Forlì
- Died: 25 February 1518
- Education: University of Bologna
- Occupations: Humanist, Poet, Professor
- Writing career
- Language: Latin
- Years active: 1489–1518
- Period: Renaissance
- Genres: Poetry, Eclogue
- Notable works: Eclogues, De Neapolitana Fornoviensique victoria
- Notable awards: Laurel wreath
- Movement: Humanism

Publio Fausto Andrelini (c. 1462 – 25 February 1518) was an Italian humanist poet, an intimate friend of Erasmus in the 1490s, who spread the New Learning in France. He taught at the University of Paris as "professor of humanity" from 1489, and became a court poet in the circle around Anne of Brittany, the queen to two kings.

== Life and work ==
Andrelini was born in Forlì. He studied law at the University of Bologna and received humanistic polish in the Roman academy of Pomponius Leto. When Leto received from Frederick III a dispensation to grant the laurel wreath, Andrelini was the first to receive it. He left the household of Ludovico Gonzaga, bishop of Mantua in 1488, for France, where he gained a position at the University of Paris teaching poetry, and attracted the notice of Charles VIII by a reading in 1496 from his De Neapolitana Fornoviensique victoria, and received an annuity.

== Publications ==
He published editions of the Latin poets. His pastoral Eclogues, full of proverbial expressions, were printed at Paris in 1506; they reflect his readings in Latin poets of the Silver Age, the eclogues of Titus Calpurnius Siculus and Nemesianus.

== Criticism ==
Erasmus, his close friend until 1511; after that year, he broke with Publio, but we don't know why. Of his poems, so Erasmus observed, "They want one thing, that which is called νοῦς in Greek, mens in Latin", nous (νοῦς) meaning mind in Greek.
