= Recusatio =

A recusatio is a poem (or part thereof) in which the poet says he is supposedly unable or disinclined to write the type of poem which he originally intended to, and instead writes in a different style.

The recusatio is something of a topos in ancient and Renaissance literature. Its use has often been interpreted as a persona deliberately adopted by the poet, allowing him to assert himself in the guise of ironic self-deprecation or feigned humility.

== Ancient Greek origins ==
The topos of recusatio was introduced by Callimachus in his Aetia fr. 1.21-4, and employed in his refusal to write a major epic, preferring slighter poetic forms. The Anacreontea contain many similar examples.

== Examples from Latin literature ==
In Augustan Rome, pressure to write an epic celebration of the emperor’s achievement was felt by almost all poets. Virgil in his Eclogue VI.3ff offered an exemplary recusatio, which at the same time held out the prospect of his ‘advancing’ to epic in the fullness of time. By contrast Propertius (I. 7ff; II.34 lines 59-66; III.3 lines 39ff) and Horace (Ode I.6; Ode II.12) made more permanent objections; while Ovid (Amores I.1; II.18 ) also presented himself as an elegist unable to reach to the heights of traditional epic.

In the Silver Age, recusatio was used by poets to write epics but to avoid the subject of emperors themselves by disclaiming their ability to write of imperial deeds. The third century AD saw recusatio employed again by Nemesianus in his Cynegetica (lines 15 - 47)

== Early modern and modern ==
- Edmund Spenser followed Virgil in The Shepheardes Calender in his recusatio of epic for pastoral, which was at the same time a programmatic prophecy of epic to come.
- Bob Dylan placed himself in the elegist tradition of recusation in his song Blind Willie McTell, with its refrain’s self-contradictory claim that “nobody can sing the blues like Blind Willie McTell”.

== See also ==
- Downshifting
- Eiron
- Palinurus
