= Paulo maiora canamus =

Latin expression

The Latin expression paulo maiora canamus, translated literally, means let us sing of things a little more elevated (Virgil, Eclogues, IV, 1). The phrase is quoted to shift from frivolous to weighty matters, or from a painful topic to a more consoling one.
