= Procurator Gynaecii =

Procurator Gynaecii (Latin for "Manager of the weaving factory"; plural procuratores gynaeciorum) is an official Roman title recorded in the document Notitia Dignitatum, a list of Imperial civil and military officials in the late 4th or early 5th century.

== The fourteen procuratores gynaeciorum ==
There were fourteen procuratores gynaeciorum in various parts of the Western Roman Empire:

Procurator gynaecii Bassianensis, Pannoniae secundae - translati Salonis.
Procurator gynaecii Sirmensis, Pannoniae secundae.
Procurator gynaecii Iovensis Dalmatiae - Aspalato.
Procurator gynaecii Aquileiensis, Venetiae inferioris.
Procurator gynaecii Mediolanensis, Liguriae.
Procurator gynaecii urbis Romae.
Procurator gynaecii Canusini et Venusini, Apuliae.
Procurator gynaecii Carthagiensis, Africae.
Procurator gynaecii Arelatiensis, provinciae Viennensis.
Procurator gynaecii Lugdunensis.
Procurator gynaecii Remensis, Belgicae secundae.
Procurator gynaecii Triberorum, Belgicae primae.
Procurator gynaecii Augustoduno translati Mettis.
Procurator gynaecii (in Britannis) Ventensis.

Notitia Dignitatum Occ.11.60.

The last in the list was stationed in Britain at a place called Venta. This is usually taken to be Venta Belgarum (Winchester), but it has been argued that Venta Icenorum (Caistor by Norwich) is intended. In the listings of Notitia Dignitatum these procuratores gynaeciorum are listed after praepositi thesaurorum and procuratores monetarum (supervisors of treasuries, managers of mints). They are listed before procuratores linyfiorum and bafiorum (managers of linen weaving factories and dyeing factories).

== The supposed procurator cynegii ==
An often repeated claim in the mastiff and bulldog community is that British fighting dogs were brought to Rome and proved superior to the molossi. The widely-repeated "fallacy" (as M. B. Wynn describes it in his 1886 book History of the Mastiff) "that at the time of the Roman dominion over Britain there existed an officer (Procurator Cynegii), who was stationed at Winchester, and that his business was to select mastiffs or bulldogs, and forward them to Rome to fight in the amphitheatre" originated in a misreading or conjecture in the text of Notitia Dignitatum by the 16th century author Wolfgangus Lazius: for the manuscript's gynaecii ("of the weaving factory") he proposed cynegii ("of the hunt"). Lazius's reading is noted, but not accepted, by William Camden in Britannia; it is not even mentioned by most modern historians. In spite of dismissal by Camden, Wynn and later authorities, the story of a "Procurator Cynegii" can still be found in recent dog literature.

Lazius's reading makes no sense in context because the procurator gynaecii in Britannis Ventensis is listed alongside the thirteen other procuratores gynaeciorum and among procuratores of imperial treasuries and stores. Although there was a British breed of dogs in Roman times (see Catuli Britanni) there is no evidence for Imperial kennels. Libourel doubts that the Romans, being used to fights involving "lions, tigers, bears, wild bulls, elephants, rhinos and men", would have been thrilled by pit dog matches. He traces this notion back to a hunting poem by Grattius, summarizing the relevant passage as: "Britain produced plucky hunting dogs". However, widely cited as a quotation from the same author is “ Although the British dogs are distinguished neither by colour nor good anatomy, I could not find any particular faults with them. When grim work must be done, when special pluck is needed when Mars summons us to battle most extreme, then the powerful Molossus will please you less and the Athamanen dog cannot measure up to the skill of the British dog either. ”

== Bibliography ==
- J. P. Wild, "The gynaeceum at Venta and its context" in Latomus vol. 26 (1967) pp. 648–676.
