= Eclogues of Nemesianus =

Book of four Latin poems attributed to Marcus Aurelius Olympius Nemesianus

The Eclogues (Latin: Eclogae Nemesiani) is a book of four Latin poems, attributed to Marcus Aurelius Olympius Nemesianus (late 3rd century AD).

== Eclogue I ==
=== Title ===
Eclogue I is entitled Epiphunus in some editions.

=== Synopsis ===
The poem is a dialogue between two characters: Tityrus and Timetas.

Tityrus is weaving a basket - Timetas encourages him to sing a song, as Pan and Apollo have given him the gift of playing on the reed pipe and singing respectively.

Tityrus replies that he is old, and suggests that he has retired from music making - whereas Timetas is a renowned singer, and recently beat Mopsus in a music contest (adjudicated by Tityrus). Tityrus recounts that Timetas' skill was praised by the, now deceased, Meliboeus and incites Timetas to honour Meliboeus' spirit with music.

Timetas agrees that Meliboeus deserves to be commemorated with music. He suggests a song/poem that he carved on the bark of a cherry tree.

Tityrus suggests that they go to a quieter spot - among elm and beech trees.

Timetas recites his poem/song. He invokes the Ether (i.e. the upper pure air), and the spirit of Meliboeus. He grieves the death of Meliboeus, even though he died in old age. Meliboeus would adjudicate the legal disputes of countryfolk. He encouraged Timetas to play music, and sang himself. Apollo, Fauns, Nymphs and Muses each offer tributes to him. Even trees and herds seem to speak his name. Timetas will sing his praises until the day that seals live in meadows, lions in the sea, trees drip honey and the seasons reverse.

Tityrus praises Timetas' song and suggests that it is good enough for the capital city. It is now late afternoon, and time to take the flocks to the river.

=== Commentary ===
Hubbard writes that "Nemesianus' First Eclogue places him in a framework of cooperative continuity with the poetic past, both honoring and honored by his predecessors in song". In this regard, various scholars have identified the character of Tityrus as representing Virgil (as per ancient readings of Virgil's Eclogues and as dramatised in Calpurnius' Eclogue IV) or as representing the pastoral tradition more generally and have identified the character of Timetas as representing Nemesianus.

Hubbard concludes that "Although intermixed with some Calpurnian references, the primary models for the characters and situation of Nem.1 are clearly Vergilian".

According to the Oxford Classical Dictionary, the threnody on Meliboeus recalls the praises of Daphnis in Virgil's Eclogue V.

== Eclogue II ==
=== Title ===
Eclogue II is entitled Donace in some editions.

=== Synopsis ===
Two 15-year-old boys, Idas and Alcon both have sex with a girl called Donace. Donace becomes pregnant and her parents imprison her. Idas and Alcon convene under a plane tree and sing/play music about her.

Idas' song invokes the Dryads and Napaean Nymphs and Naiads. The song claims that Idas has been waiting in caves for Donace for three days. Whilst Idas waits for her, his cows do not eat or produce milk, and Idas has stopped making baskets for curdling milk. The song boasts of the size of Idas' herd and milk production and sings of how Donace used to kiss Idas while he played his pipe. In the song, Idas asks for Donace's pity, as he has turned pale and will not eat or drink wine and explains that without Donace, flowers have lost their colour and laurel its fragrance. Idas claims to love only Donace.

The narrator then introduces Alcon's response.

Alcon invokes Pales, Apollo, Silvanus and Venus. He bemoans his desertion by Donace. He tells of how he would bring her gifts (unlike Idas), such as a nightingale, a hare and wood pigeons. In case Donace thinks that it is shameful that he is a rustic oxherd, he points out that gods such as Apollo, Pan, Fauns and Adonis feed herds of cattle. He refers to his youthful beauty and musical skill.

The boys thus sing until evening, when they have to leave the woods and take their bulls to their stables.

=== Commentary ===
Karakasis considers that an "intermingling of long-established pastoral features with elegiac dispositions is to be read throughout this poem" and that "both characters .... prove, by means of their song performance, unable to overcome their elegiac passion, despite their pastoral identity".

The poem begins with a description of what Heyworth describes as "a disturbingly casual description of a double rape". Hubbard notes that "the verb invasere (Nem 2.6) often used as a term of military attack, can in this context only denote forcible rape". However, Keene (writing in the late 19th century) describes Donace as the mistress of Idas and Alcon and as being "of more than doubtful character". Karakasis notes that "any sexual intercourse with a maiden may be described in Roman literature as rape, irrespective of whether or not the puella regards it so", but also that "Donace's reactions... are not recorded for, as often happens in ancient literature, sexual pleasure is seen from the male perspective".

McGill notes that verses 37 - 39, which (apart from the first four words of v. 37) repeat verbatim verses 56 - 58 of Calpurnius Eclogue III is a "striking exception to the rule" that "rarely does an imitating poet reproduce an entire line of a model".

Hubbard notes that, whilst many scholars criticise Nemesianus for his unoriginal overuse of quotations from various literary sources, his use of such sources (in Eclogue II, in particular) is more selective and that this "technique of multiple allusion diminishes Virgil's role from dominant and overpowering father figure to one of a series of models...."

Conte considers this poem to be an evident example of Nemesianus' originality of approach: "although the models are present, in the overall structure...or in various episodes or in expressions and nexus that contain exact verbal repetitions...one is bound to be aware of a new sensibility and attitude".

Karakasis considers that, the fact that the boys convene under the shade of a plane tree (like in Calpurnius Eclogue IV.2), rather than a pine tree (as in Theocritean pastoral poetry), beech tree (as in Virgilian pastoral poetry) or under a generic collection of trees suggests "the extended accumulated pastoral tradition Nemesianus is working with..."

Although it is editorial convention to mark the first song as "sung" by Idas, and the second by Alcon, Idas is described as playing his song on the reed pipes/flute, whereas only Alcon is described as actually singing (verses 53 - 54). Hubbard concludes that this must mean that "Alcon sings both songs, whilst Idas plays the instrumental accompaniment". Karakasis notes that "In opposition to the Vergilian fifth eclogue, where the initial distinction between song and flute-playing is not kept, Nemesianus' pastoral characters remain faithful to their initial allotment of tasks".

== Eclogue III ==
=== Title ===
Eclogue III is entitled Pan in some editions, and Bacchus in some other editions.

=== Synopsis ===
Pan is sleeping under an elm tree. Three youths, Nyctilus, Micon and Amyntas, steal Pan's pipe and try to play it. The pipe makes a dissonant noise, waking Pan. Pan tells them that no one can play his pipes, but offers to sing a song about the birth of Bacchus.

Pan invokes Bacchus. Pan refers to Bacchus' gestation by Jupiter and how, as a baby and child he was cared for by nymphs, fauns, satyrs and, in particular, by Silenus. Pan describes how, as Bacchus grew older, he grew full horns and encouraged the Satyrs to pick and tread grapes. He describes how the Satyrs got drunk on the wine and chased after nymphs lustfully, and how Silenus also drank much wine. Pan explains how, ever since, Bacchus makes wine, and Pan refers to Bacchus' cultic associations - the thyrsus and lynx.

Pan's song ends - it is night, so the youths drive their sheep back and attend to milking and cheese-making.

=== Commentary ===
Eclogue III is modeled on Virgil's Eclogue VI (in which Silenus is caught sleeping, wakes and recites a poem) which, as Hubbard notes, does not seem to have been adopted as a model by other post-Virgilian Latin poets.

According to Keene "Wernsdorf mentions several extant gems, the carvings of which illustrate the various scenes described in this Eclogue" and Hubbard considers that Nemesianus has enriched this poem with references from contemporary iconography.

Hubbard concludes that "the end result is a parody of Silenus' ambitious song of the cosmos in Vergil, but perhaps also a significant reading of that song as itself a parody of epic forms".

Heyworth notes that Pan's song is "not a cosmological catalogue poem [like Silenus' song in Virgil's Eclogue VI], but a hymn to Bacchus of a markedly didactic nature."

== Eclogue IV ==
=== Title ===
Eclogue IV is entitled Eros in some editions.

=== Structure ===
Eclogue IV is written in hexameters. It is 73 lines long. After a 13 line narrative introduction, the two characters (Mopsus and Lycidas) take turns in reciting alternating 5 verse stanzas. After each such stanza, there follows a one line refrain: cantet, amat quod quisque: levant et carmina curas ("Let each sing of what he loves: song too relieves love's pangs").

=== Synopsis ===
Two herdsmen, Lycidas and Mopsus convene under the shade of a poplar. Mopsus loves a girl called Meroe and Lycidas loves a boy called Iollas. However both Meroe and Iollas mock their suitors and keep standing them up and avoiding them. Lycidas and Mopsus sing about their unrequited loves.

Mopsus starts by asking why Meroe is avoiding him and his music - and asks her to turn him down directly.

Lycidas asks Iollas to pay attention to him, and warns that youthful beauty is short-lived.

Mopsus points out how even animals feel love: yet Meroe flees from it.

Lycidas ponders upon the passage of time - and that Iollas is already 20 years old.

Mopsus asks Meroe to come and rest with him in the shade: even all the animals are taking a break.

Lycidas tells Iollas not to get sunburn; but to rest with him in the shade.

Mopsus sings of the extreme endurance of any man who suffers Meroe's disdain.

Lycidas warns other men who love boys to toughen up and have patience - in the hope that one day a god will grant them success.

Mopsus ponders upon the pointlessness of undergoing certain rituals, if he still burns with unrequited love.

Lycidas explains that, even though a witch called Mycale cast spells for him, he still thinks Iollas is beautiful.

=== Commentary ===
Karakasis notes that this poem "can also be integrated into the established pattern of a 'generic interaction' between pastoral and elegy". Karakasis notes that the locations that Meroe and Iollas shun (such as groves springs and caves) "are strongly associated with the bucolic genre, to the extent of occasionally standing in as its meta-linguistic symbols as well" and that "Meroe's and Iollas' avoidance of all these generic constituents of pastoral may also be read as a certain willingness for transcending 'traditional pastoral' towards other 'generic directions'".

Hubbard focuses upon how, in Eclogue IV, Mopsus has exclusively heterosexual, and Lycidas has exclusively homosexual inclinations: contrasting this with the "framework of a generalized bisexuality" that is found in much preceding pastoral poetry. He explains that the "unique polarization of sexual object choice may owe something to the evolution of social attitudes in the second and third centuries A.D."

Hubbard notes the absence of a closing narrative, after Mopsus and Lycidas' final song exchange. He likens this to Virgil's Eclogues II and VIII and notes that "the effect is again one of open-ended doubt and ambiguity". This lack of closure leads Heyworth to comment that "the pastoral collection is either unfinished or fragmentary".

== Transmission and attribution to Nemesianus ==
The Eclogues of Nemesianus have come down to us through the manuscript tradition, together with the seven Eclogues of Calpurnius Siculus, as a single collection of 11 Eclogues. In her survey of extant ancient/medieval sources of the Eclogues, Williams identifies 30 manuscripts and 7 anthologies. Williams is also of the view that the extant manuscripts all derive from a single common archetype - as evidenced by certain common corruptions.

Each of the surviving manuscripts bears the name of Calpurnius Siculus alone. However, since at least the late fifteenth century edition of Angelus Ugoletus, the first seven poems in the manuscripts are usually attributed to Calpurnius Siculus, and the last four are attributed to Nemesianus, on the basis of certain lost manuscript comments, and on the basis of stylistic evidence.

The stylistic evidence for attributing the last four poems to the later Nemesianus includes:

- the more frequent use of elision in the last four poems;
- the more frequent use of unclassical shortenings of the final "o" of words, in the last four poems;
- more general metrical differences between the first seven and last four poems;
- the use of parenthetic insertions of "memimi" and "fateor" in the first seven poems only;
- the allusions to the emperor in certain of the first seven poems (I, IV and VII), but not in the last four poems;
- References and allusions to the first seven poems in the last four poems (suggesting that the poet of the last four poems is self-consciously alluding to the other); and
- Stylistic similarities between the last four poems and the Cynegetica of Nemesianus.

Radke has argued to the contrary: that the Eclogues all were written by the same poet, citing - among other things the lack of scribal errors that might be indicative of two different manuscript traditions. Radke's arguments were challenged by Williams.

== Editions and Translation ==
- Duff, J.W. and Duff, A.M. (1934) Minor Latin Poets (Vol 2) - Loeb Classical Library - with English translation (excerpted version available online).
- Keene, C.H. (1887) The Eclogues of Calpurnius Siculus and M. Aurelius Olympius Nemesianus - with introduction, commentary and appendix (available online).
- Williams, H.J. (1986) Eclogues and Cynegetica of Nemesianus - with introduction, critical apparatus and commentary.
