= Saleius Bassus =

Saleius Bassus was a Roman epic poet. He lived during the reign of Vespasian, being a contemporary of Gaius Valerius Flaccus.

Quintilian credited him with a vigorous and poetical genius and Julius Secundus, one of the speakers in Tacitus' Dialogus de oratoribus styles him a perfect poet and most illustrious bard. Saleius was apparently overtaken by poverty, but was generously treated by Vespasian who gave him a present of 500,000 sesterces. Nothing from his works has been preserved; the Laus Pisonis, which has been attributed to him, is probably by Lucan or Titus Calpurnius Siculus.
