= Ichneumon =

Ichneumon (ἰχνεύμων, "tracker" in Greek) may refer to:

- Ichneumon (genus), a genus of wasps
- Ichneumon, species of wasps in the family Ichneumonidae
- Ichneumon, an alternative name for the Egyptian mongoose
- Ichneumon (medieval zoology), the enemy of the dragon in medieval literature
