= Ichneumon (medieval zoology) =

Enemy of the dragon in medieval literature

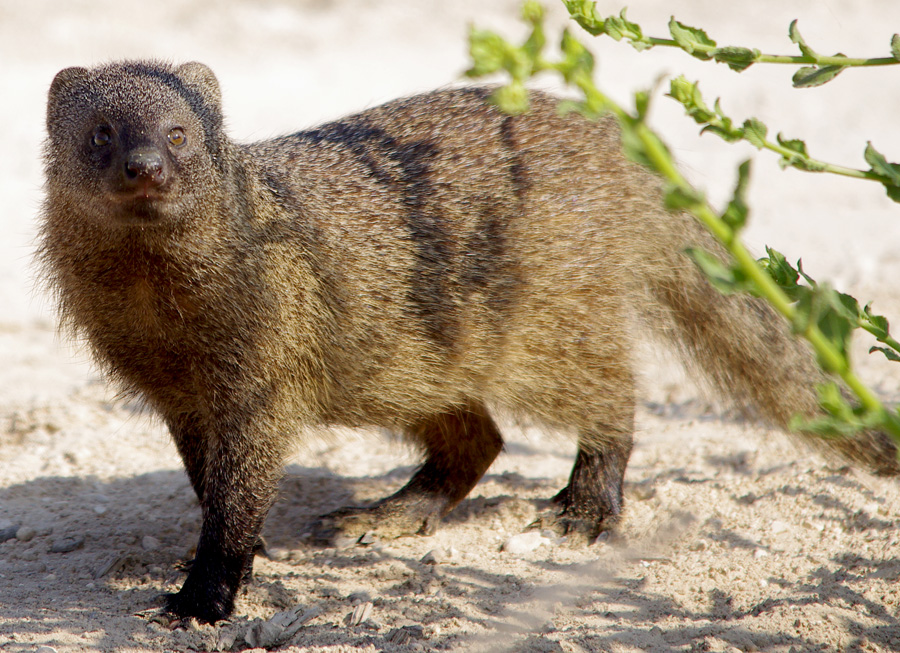
Egyptian mongoose, believed to be the ichneumon of medieval accounts.

In medieval literature, the ichneumon or echinemon was the enemy of the dragon. When it sees a dragon, the ichneumon covers itself with mud, and closing its nostrils with its tail, attacks and kills the dragon. The ichneumon was also considered by some to be the enemy of the crocodile and the asp, and attacks them in the same way. The name was used for the "pharaoh's rat", mongoose, or Egyptian mongoose (Herpestes ichneumon), which attacks snakes; it can also mean "otter". The ichneumon is shaped similarly to a ferret, although much slimmer in its shape, and the head is elongated. Also, it is an animal that can move swiftly and is able to jump a couple of yards with a single leap.

== Etymology ==
Ichneumon (ἰχνεύμων) means "tracker" in Greek.

== Primary sources ==
- Pliny the Elder: "The ichneumon, too, is [the asp's] enemy to the very death. This hostility is the especial glory of this animal, which is also produced in Egypt. It plunges itself repeatedly into the mud, and then dries itself in the sun: as soon as, by these means, it has armed itself with a sufficient number of coatings, it proceeds to the combat. Raising its tail, and turning its back to the serpent, it receives its stings, which are inflicted to no purpose, until at last, turning its head sideways, and viewing its enemy, it seizes it by the throat."
- Strabo: "[...] but the Heracleotæ worship the ichneumon, which is most destructive both to crocodiles and asps. The ichneumons destroy not only the eggs of the latter, but the animals themselves. The ichneumons are protected by a covering of mud, in which they roll, and then dry themselves in the sun. They then seize the asps by the head or tail, and dragging them into the river, so kill them. They lie in wait for the crocodiles, when the latter are basking in the sun with their mouths open; they then drop into their jaws, and eating through their intestines and belly, issue out of the dead body."
- Nemesianus, in the introduction to his Cynegetica, refers to hunting the ichneumon on river banks among rushes. The poem is fragmentary and any longer passages describing such a hunt have been lost.
- Leonardo da Vinci: "This animal is the mortal enemy of the asp. It is a native of Egypt and when it sees an asp near its place, it runs at once to the bed or mud of the Nile and with this makes itself muddy all over, then it dries itself in the sun, smears itself again with mud, and thus, drying one after the other, it makes itself three or four coatings like a coat of mail. Then it attacks the asp, and fights well with him, so that, taking its time it catches him in the throat and destroys him."

== In poetry ==
In Christopher Smart's Jubilate Agno, Smart wrote that his cat Jeoffrey had killed an "Ichneumon-rat".
