= Christopher Wase =

English 17th century scholar, author, translator, and educator

Christopher Wase (1627 – 29 August 1690) was an English scholar, writer, translator, and educator, who was the Architypographus of Oxford University Press for several years.

== Life ==
The son of John Wase of London, he was born in Hackney. He was educated at Eton College, and in 1645 was admitted scholar of King's College, Cambridge. Wase became Fellow of King's, and graduated B.A. in 1648. In 1649 he published a translation of Sophocles's ‘Electra,’ dedicated to Princess Elizabeth, with an appendix designed to show his devotion to the Stuart house. John Walker says that Wase also delivered a feigned letter from the king to Benjamin Whichcote, the Provost of King's. He was deprived of his fellowship and left England.

Captured at sea, Wase was imprisoned at Gravesend, but escaped, and served in the Spanish army against the French. He was taken prisoner, but was released, and returned to England and became tutor to William, the eldest son of Philip Herbert, 5th Earl of Pembroke.

In 1655 Wase proceeded M.A. and was appointed headmaster of the royal free school in Dedham, Essex. From 1662 to 1668 he was headmaster of Tonbridge School, where the register states that he was B.D., and educated at the school Thomas Herbert, younger brother of William Herbert. In 1671 he became superior beadle at law and printer to the university of Oxford. He died on 29 August 1690, in Oxford.

== Works ==
In 1647 Nicholas Gray, the Head Master of Eton, published Wase's Greek version of Hugo Grotius's Baptizatorum Puerorum Institutio (other editions 1650, 1665, 1668, and 1682).

In 1649, Wase published his translation of the Electra of Sophocles. It called upon Prince Charles, then living in Jersey, to avenge the death of his father, Charles I. Oliver Cromwell was figured as Egist, killed by Charles as Orestes. The debate between the two sisters represent the political options facing Royalists in the immediate aftermath of the regicide: compromise with the new Commonwealth government or resist it. Wase appended two poems anticipating the immediate restoration of the monarchy, one of which mentions John Milton and alludes to his divorce tracts. His Latin notebooks, many of which contain political poems written during the 1650s, are in the Bodleian Library.

In 1654 Wase dedicated to his pupil William Herbert a translation of the Cynegeticon of Faliscus Gratius. Edmund Waller addressed a copy of verses to Wase on this performance.

In 1668, Wase published the first complete English-language edition of Phaedrus's Fables. In 1678, he produced a survey of free schools throughout all of England; in many cases, his survey is the only surviving record of those schools' existence. Considerations concerning Free Schools in England (Oxford, 1678) urged an increase in the number of schools, and the claims of scholars on the wealthy.

Besides the works mentioned, Wase also published:

- In Mirabilem Caroli II … restitutionem carmen gratulatorium, London, 1660.
- Methodi practicæ specimen; an Essay of a Practical Grammar, 1660; 8th edit. amended, 1682.
- English-Latin and Latin-English Dictionary, 1661.
- Latin Version of Sir John Spelman's Life of Alfred, 1678.
- Translation of Cicero's Tusculans, 1683.
- Animadversiones Nonianæ, Oxford, 1685.
- C. Wasii Senarius, sive de Legibus et Licentia veterum Poetarum, Oxford, 1687.

Thomas Hearne, in his preface to John Leland's Itinerary, refers to Wase as an "eminent philologer". His manuscripts were preserved in the library of Corpus Christi College, Oxford. A small oval portrait is mentioned by James Granger.
