= Laus Pisonis =

1st century AD Latin verse panegyric

The Laus Pisonis (Praise of Piso) is a Latin verse panegyric of the 1st century AD in praise of a man of the Piso family. The exact identity of the subject is not certain. Some scholars identify him with Gaius Calpurnius Piso, the leader of a conspiracy against Nero in AD 65; Others argue for a later date, one possible candidate being a Piso mentioned by Pliny the Younger as the young author of a poem in Greek, who became consul in 111 AD. The Latinity is straightforward; the subject is praised for his oratorical ability as an advocate in law cases, for the kindness with which he maintains his house open to poor men of talent, but also for his skill at playing ball, composing poetry in Greek, and especially the board game of latrunculi, for which the poem is one of our main sources. The author three times addresses Piso as a iuvenis ("young man"), but also mentions that he had been consul and had made a speech in the senate praising the Emperor.

About the author of the work there is considerably more doubt; it has been attributed to Saleius Bassus, Statius, Lucan and Calpurnius Siculus among others. Whoever he was, the author says in the concluding verses of his poem that he was not yet twenty years old.

The work, comprising 261 dactylic hexameters, has come down via a single manuscript once preserved in the monastery of Lorsch, and now lost; although sizeable portions were also preserved in several medieval florilegia, the manuscripts of which are still extant. The editio princeps is in J. Sichard's edition of Ovid, Basel, 1527, and the work has seen about a dozen editions over the centuries, having drawn the attention of Joseph Scaliger and Emil Baehrens among others. A restoration of the archetype of the florilegia was published by Berthold Ullman.

== Summary ==
– 1 The writer wonders which to praise more, Piso's own virtues or his noble ancestry, since the Calpurnian family descend from Calpus (son of King Numa Pompilius).

– 22 Piso's ancestors' deeds in war have been recorded by earlier poets; now that wars have quietened down, it is possible to show valour in civic life. Addressing Piso as iuvenis facunde ('eloquent young man'), he encourages him to outdo his ancestors by victories in the law courts. The crowds which once watched his ancestors' military triumphs now pack the courts to hear him speak. With his eloquence he is able to control the jurors just as a Thessalian horseman controls his horse. His speeches surpass the forcefulness of Ulysses, the brevity of Menelaus, and the eloquence of Nestor (three warriors from the Iliad). He also reminds Piso of the success of his speech as consul in the Senate in praise of the Emperor. The poet says, however, that he himself does not have the strength to match Piso's eloquence with his own.

– 81 Calling on the Muse Calliope to help him, the poet describes how when the law courts are closed, the young men of Rome flock to Piso's house to hear him speak. He is skilled in Greek culture also and is able to compose a fine epigram. The dignity of his noble demeanour, his faithfulness, and his freedom of speech combined with modesty are also remarkable.

– 109 The poet describes how Piso is generous to his poor clients and dependants, treating them as equals, respecting them, and appreciating their different talents. Like the seasons, Piso is able to change from one thing to another easily, from the dignity of the courts to the playfulness of his free time, composing poetry or playing the lyre. One could believe that the god Phoebus himself had taught him the lyre, and the poet encourages him to play and to imitate the warrior Achilles, who was skilled in the lyre as well as in fighting.

– 178 He goes on to describe Piso's skill in fencing, playing ball, and especially at playing the board game known as ludus latrunculorum, which the poet describes in terms of battling with soldiers.

– 209 The poet begs Piso to accept the gift of his poem. If his present effort falls short, he hopes he will do better in future. He begs Piso to become his patron, so that he can develop his talents. Virgil would never have become famous without the patronage of Maecenas, who also encouraged the tragedian and epic poet Varius, and the lyricist Horace. He begs Piso to help him, as a man stretches out his hand to help a swimmer in the water. Though the poet comes from a humble family and is only 19 years old, he can emerge from the darkness of poverty with Piso's help.

== Ludus latrunculorum ==
The ludus latrunculorum, or simply latrunculi, was a board game played with black and white circular glass pieces on a plain board of 6 x 6 or 8 x 8 squares. The aim was to capture as many as possible of the opponent's pieces by surrounding each one with two of one's own pieces on either rank or file. Pieces were allowed to move forwards or backwards but not diagonally. A glass piece or counter is referred to in the Laus Pisonis (lines 193, 196) and in Ovid (Ars Amatoria 2.207–8, Tristia 2.477–8) as a calculus or miles. The name latrunculi (which literally means 'highwaymen' or 'brigands') is found in Seneca the Younger, Varro and Pliny the Elder.

== Bibliography ==
- Austin, R. G. (1934), "Roman Board Games. I". Greece & Rome, 4(10), 24–34.
- Austin, R. G. (1935). "Roman board games. II". Greece & Rome, 4(11), 76–82.
- Bell, A. A. (1985). "A New Approach to the Laus Pisonis". Latomus, 44(Fasc. 4), 871–878.
- Green, S. J. (2010). "‘(No) arms and a man’: The imperial pretender, the opportunistic poet and the Laus Pisonis". The Classical Quarterly, 60(2), 497–523.
- Reeve, M. D. (1984). "The Addressee of Laus Pisonis". Illinois Classical Studies, 9(1), 42–48.
- Richmond, J. (1994). "The Ludus Latrunculorum and Laus Pisonis 190–208". Museum Helveticum, 51(3), 164–179.
- Ullman, B. L. (1929). "The Text Tradition and Authorship of the Laus Pisonis". Classical Philology, 24(2), 109–132.
