= Moriz Haupt =

German philologist

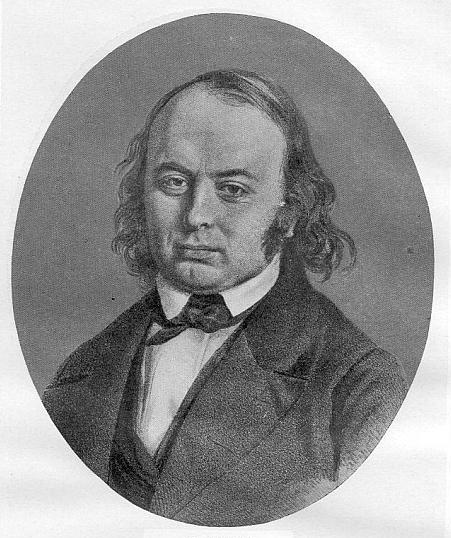
Moriz Haupt

Rudolph Friedrich Moriz Haupt (27 July 1808 – 5 February 1874) was a German philologist.

== Biography ==
He was born at Zittau, Lusatia, Saxony. His early education was mainly conducted by his father, Ernst Friedrich Haupt, burgomaster of Zittau, a man of learning who took pleasure in translating German hymns or Goethe's poems into Latin, and whose memoranda were employed by Gustav Freytag in his Bilder aus der deutschen Vergangenheit. From the Zittau gymnasium, where he spent the five years 1821–1826, Haupt moved to the University of Leipzig intending to study theology; but his own inclinations and the influence of Professor Gottfried Hermann soon turned him in the direction of classical philology.

On the close of his university course (1830) he returned to his father's house, and the next seven years were devoted to study, not only of Greek, Latin and German, but of Old French, Provençal and Bohemian. His friendship with Karl Lachmann, formed at Berlin, had great effect on his intellectual development. In September 1837 he qualified at Leipzig as Privatdozent, and his first lectures, dealing with such diverse subjects as Catullus and the Nibelungenlied, indicated the two main strands of his interest. A new chair of German language and literature was founded for his benefit, and he became professor extraordinarius (1841) and then professor ordinarius (1843). In 1842 he married Louise Hermann, the daughter of his master and colleague.

Having taken part in 1849 with Otto Jahn and Theodor Mommsen in a political agitation for the maintenance of the imperial constitution, Haupt was deprived of his professorship by a decree of April 22, 1851. Two years later, however, he was called to succeed Lachmann at the University of Berlin and at the same time the Berlin Academy, which had made him a corresponding member in 1841, elected him an ordinary member. In 1861 he became perpetual secretary of the Academy. For 21 years, he was prominent among the scholars of the Prussian capital, making his presence felt, not only by the prestige of his erudition and the clearness of his intellect, but by the tirelessness of his energy and the ardent fearlessness of his temperament. His service to both classical and German philology was rendered chiefly as an editor of texts. He died of heart disease in Berlin.

== Work ==
=== Latin classics ===
Haupt's critical work is distinguished by a combination of the most painstaking investigation with bold conjecture; his oft-cited dictum that "If the sense requires it, I am prepared to write Constantinopolitanus where the MSS have the monosyllabic interjection o" well expresses this boldness. While in his lectures and speeches he was frequently carried away by the excitement of the moment, and made sharp and questionable attacks on his opponents, in his writings he exhibits great self-control. The results of many of his researches are lost, because he would not publish what fell short of his own high ideal of excellence. To the progress of classical scholarship he contributed by Quaestiones Catullianae (1837), and editions of Ovid's Halieutica and the Cynegetica of Grattius and Nemesianus (1838), of Catullus, Tibullus and Propertius (3rd ccl., 1868), of Horace (3rd ed, 1871) and of Virgil (2nd ccl., 1873).

=== German philology ===
As early as 1836, with Hoffmann von Fallersleben, he started the Altdeutsche Blätter, which in 1841 gave place to the Zeitschrift für deutsches Alterthum, of which he continued editor until his death. Hartmann von Aue's Erec (1839) and his Lieder und Büchlein and Der arme Heinrich (1842), Rudolf von Ems's Guter Gerhard (1840) and Konrad von Würzburg's Engelhard (1844) are the principal German works which he edited.

=== Other inclinations ===
To form a collection of the French songs of the 16th century was one of his favourite schemes, but a little volume published after his death, Französische Volkslieder (1877), is the only monument of his labours in that direction.

Three volumes of his Opuscula were published at Leipzig (1875–1877).
