= Grattius =

Roman poet fl. 63 BC – 14 AD

Grattius (or Gratius) Faliscus was a Roman poet who flourished during the life of Augustus (63 BC – 14 AD). He is known as the author of a Cynegetica, a poem on hunting.

== Life ==
The only reference to Grattius in any extant ancient writer is a passing reference in Ovid, Ex Ponto:

Tityrus antiquas et erat qui pasceret herbas
Aptaque venanti Gratius arma daret.

Some lines by Manilius have been supposed to allude to Grattius, but the terms in which they are expressed are too vague to warrant such a conclusion. According to Johann Christian Wernsdorf, who argued from the name, he must have been a slave or a freedman. The cognomen, or epithet, Faliscus, from which it has been inferred that he was a native of Falerii was first introduced by Barth, on the authority of a manuscript which no one else ever saw, and probably originated in a forced interpretation of one of the lines in the poem, "At contra nostris imbellia lina Faliscis" (5.40). William Ramsay argued that in the context, "nostris" here denotes merely "Italian", in contradistinction to the various foreign tribes spoken of in the preceding verses.

== Cynegeticon ==
541 hexameter lines of Grattius's poem about hunting are preserved in a manuscript of c. 800 AD. The work describes various kinds of game, methods of hunting, and the best breeds of horses and dogs, using a fairly regular hexameter to do so. Grattius stresses the role of ratio (reason) in hunting, seeing it as a civilising endeavour in the tradition of Hercules, as opposed to indulgence in luxuria.

=== Contents ===
The poem, entitled Cynegeticon Liber, professes to set forth the apparatus (arma) necessary for the sportsman, and the manner in which the various requisites for the pursuit of game are to be procured, prepared, and preserved (artes armorum). Among the arma of the hunter are included not only nets, gins, snares (retia, pedicae, laquei), darts and spears (jacula, venabula), but also horses and dogs, and a large portion of the undertaking (verses 150–430) is devoted to a systematic account of the different kinds of hounds and horses.

The matter and arrangement of the treatise are derived in a great measure from Xenophon, although information was drawn from other ancient sources, such as Dercylus the Arcadian, and Hagnon of Boeotia.

=== Appraisal ===
According to Ramsay, the language of the Cynegetica is pure, and not unworthy of the age to which it belongs, but there is frequently a harshness in the structure of the periods, a strange and unauthorised use of particular words, and a general want of distinctness, which, in addition to a very corrupt text, render it a task of great difficulty to determine the exact meaning of many passages. Although considerable skill is manifested in the combination of the parts – Ramsay continues – the author did not possess sufficient power to overcome the obstacles which were triumphantly combated by Virgil.

It is remarkable that both the second-century poets Oppianus and Nemesianus arrogate to themselves the honour of having entered upon a path altogether untrodden. Whether we believe them to be sincere and ignorant, or suspect them of deliberate dishonesty, their bold assertion is sufficient to prove that the poem of Grattius had in their day become almost totally unknown.

=== Editions ===
The Cynegetica has been transmitted to modern times through the medium of a single manuscript, which was brought from Gaul to Italy by Actius Sannazarius about the beginning of the sixteenth century, and contained also the Cynegetica of Nemesianus, and the Halieutica ascribed to Ovid. A second copy of the first 159 lines was found by Jan van Vliet appended to another manuscript of the Halieutics.

The editio princeps was printed at Venice in February 1534, by Aldus Manutius, in a volume that included the Halieutica of Ovid, the Cynegetica and Carmen Bucolicum of Nemesianus, the Buolica of Calpurnius Siculus, and the Venatio of Hadrianus. This edition was reprinted at Augsburg in July of the same year. The best editions are those contained in the Poetae Latini Minores of Pieter Burmann the Elder (vol. i. Lug. Bat. 1731), and of Wernsdorf (vol. i. p. 6, 293, ii. p. 34, iv. pt. ii. p. 790, 806, v. pt. iii. p. 1445), whose introductions provide all the requisite preliminary information.

=== Translations ===
A translation into English verse with notes, and the Latin text, by Christopher Wase, was published at London in 1654, and a translation into German, also metrical, by S. E. G. Perlet, at Leipzig, in 1826.

== See also ==
- Calpurnius Siculus
- Didactic poetry
