= Cynegetica (Nemesianus) =

Didactic poem by Nemesianus

The Cynegetica is a didactic Latin poem about hunting by Marcus Aurelius Nemesianus. (He is also named in some modern literature as Marcus Aurelius Olympius Nemesianus - a nonexistent poet by the name of Olympius Nemesianus was invented in the Historia Augusta, and he and his name were conflated with the real poet). The poem is usually dated to 283/284 A.D. - as it refers to the reign of the Roman Emperors Carinus and Numerian (AD 283 - 284).

== Structure and Synopsis ==
The following structural division of the poem is proposed by Toohey

I Proem (lines 1- 102)
Nemesianus announces that his poem's theme is hunting and the "battles of the countryside" (proelia ruris). He is inspired by Castalius (i.e. Apollo), the Muses and Bacchus to set off on untested ground. Nemesianus briefly refers to various clichéd mythological themes (the myths of Niobe, Semele, Pentheus, Dirce, Hippodamia, the Danaides, Biblis, Myrrha, Cadmus, Io and Argus, Hercules, Tereus, Phaethon, the house of Tantalus, Medea, Glauce, Nisus, Circe and Antigone), but states that poets have already sung all about them. Instead, Nemesianus states that his preferred theme is hunting hares, does, wolves, foxes, ichneumon, polecats and hedgehogs and states that his task is to venture out from safe waters into the stormy Adriatic (i.e. to sing about these unusual poetic themes, rather than playing it safe by writing about traditional mythological material).
Nemesianus claims that he will sing the praises of Carinus and Numerian at a later date (although he nonetheless catalogues their battles and victories on the Rhine, Tigris and Nile, in Persia, at Babylon and against the Parthians and other military glories). He then invokes Diana and the nymphs, and asks Diana to inspire his poem about hunting (instead of urban and military themes).
II. Dogs (lines 103 - 239)
Nemesianus explains, step by step, season by season, the process for breeding, raising and training young dogs. He also explains the benefits of rearing different breeds of dogs - Spartan, Molossian, from Britannia, Pannonian, Spanish, Libyan, and Tuscan dogs.
III. Horses (lines 240- 298)
Nemesianus described various noble and powerful breeds of horses from Greece and Cappadocia and Spain. Nemesianus also describes certain North African breeds, which are less beautiful but obedient and fast - just like Boreas, who blasts over the sea, amazing the Nereids. Nemesianus finishes this section with the raising and caring for horses.
IV. Hunting equipment (lines 299 - 320)
Nemesianus explains that the huntsmen must learn to make various types of nets and cordons - adorned with coloured feathers (to scare animals, in order to keep them within the cordoned-off area). Nemesianus describes some of the different types of bird feathers - from vultures, cranes, swans, geese, water fowl.
V. Hunting
hunting season (lines 321 - 5)
Nemesianus recommends that hunting should begin at the start of winter - the teams should set out with their nets and cordons, dogs and horses in the early morning (when animal tracks are fresh). The poem breaks off at this point.

== Commentary and Analysis ==
=== Metre ===
The Cynegetica is written in hexameter verse.

Duff and Duff note the following metrical features (some of which are features of later Latin literature):

- shortening of the vowel o at the end of words such as devotio (l.83) and exerceto (l.187).
- only one hiatus ("catuli huc", 1.143).
- less use of elision.

=== Length and state of completion of Text ===
325 lines of the Cynegetica survive. It is generally agreed that the poem is incomplete.

It is uncertain whether Nemesianus never finished the poem, or whether it was finished but with sections that have subsequently been lost. Martin takes the view that the poem was by the "Olympius Nemesianus" invented in the Historia Augusta, and that it was finished, but lost in transmission. He notes that the (pseudo-author) "Vopiscus" in the Historia Augusta mentions the poem as a literary achievement, and he argues that an unfinished work would not be so mentioned. He also refers to Haupt's textual analysis (based on the fact that the final leaf of a manuscript is filled completely).

It is unknown how long the Cynegetica originally was. Williams cites the length of Oppian's four volume Cynegetica as a precedent for a reasonably long work - although he notes that there is no evidence that Nemesianus' Cynegetica was as long. Toohey estimates that Nemesianus' poem was at least 400 lines long, on the basis of the length of its proem.

=== Place in the Tradition of Ancient Greek and Latin Didactic Poetry ===
Toohey notes that the Cynegetica displays the typical features of the tradition of ancient Greek and Latin didactic poetry: an addressee, detailed technical instructions, narrative or mythological panels, the use of hexameter verse and a likely original length of over 400 lines.

Toohey considers that the Cynegetica offers "a literature of escape": i.e. escape from/alternative to the concerns of city and public life and that it is fixated on leisure. In this regard, Toohey sees the Cynegetica's preoccupation with escapism and leisure as an exception to the general themes of didactic poetry of the same period (which he terms the "sixth phase" of didactic poetry) and as representing the extreme end of the didactic tradition (contrasting with Hesiod's concern with work and the participation in social justice at the other end of this spectrum).

=== Place in the Tradition of Tradition of Ancient Greek and Latin Cynegetic Literature ===
There are several extant works of Ancient Greek and Latin literature on the subject of hunting that predate Nemesianus' Cynegetica - some in written in prose, others in verse: Xenophon's Cynegetica (in Greek), Arrian of Nicodemus' supplement to Xenophon's work focusing on Greyhound coursing (also in Greek), Oppian's Cynegetica in four books (in Greek) and Grattius' Latin poem, of which 541 verses survive

Scholars have considered the extent to which Cynegetica was aware of and influenced by such literature, especially given Nemesianus' claim to originality of theme "insistere prato/complacitum, rudibus qua luceat orbita sulcis" ("it is our dear resolve to set foot upon a mead where the track lies clear mid furrows hitherto untried"). Martin considers that Nemesianus' work bears very little resemblance to Xenophon's and Arrian's, but a much larger debt to Oppian's. Although Grattius' work was sufficiently well known to be referred to by Ovid (Pont 4.16.34), Martin considers that Nemesianus does not seem to imitate Grattius - referring to the lack of similarity of diction, different use of technical terms and the different structure/order of material. Martin concludes that Nemesianus may not even have heard of the Cynegtica of Grattius, given such divergences.

Toohey points out that Nemesianus' Cynegetica is hardly a practical manual on hunting. Aymard is of the view that Nemesianus seems to have no practical experience of hunting and so must have taken all his purported knowledge on the subject from literary sources, despite his claim to literary originality. In contrast, Anderson considers that Nemesianus does have something to say that does not come merely from books - citing strange or unpleasant details (such forcing a mother dog to rescue puppies by encircling them with fire - ll. 140f.) and the anticipation of a medieval veterinary practice of bleeding horses (ll. 284f).

=== Virgilian Influence ===
Virgil was an influence on, and model for, Nemesianus.

Martin notes, in particular, the influence of Virgil's Third Georgic. In particular:

- Both Virgil and Nemesianus scorn dealing with trite mythological themes (Georgic III, lines 3 - 8, Cynegetica lines 15-47);
- Both Virgil and Nemesianus state that they will write of new rustic themes, predicting glory for themselves in so doing (Georgic III, lines 8 - 12, 291 - 3, Cynegetica lines 1 - 15);
- Both Virgil and Nemesianus promise to sing of loftier themes such as the glories of Caesar at a later time (Georgic III, lines 46–48, Cynegetica lines 63ff);
- Both Virgil's Third Georgic and Nemesianus' Cynegetica deal with breeding/caring for animals (including horses and dogs)
- In particular, Nemesianus imitates Virgil's description of the good features of a horse (see Georgic III, lines 79 - 88 and Cynegetica lines 243 - 50), and Virgil's comparison of the speed of a horse with the north wind (Georgic III, lines 196–201, Cynegetica lines 272-8);
- Although Virgil only devotes a few lines to dogs and hunting, these lines are imitated by Nemesianus, in his more extensive passages (Georgic III, lines 404–13, Cynegetica lines 103 - 237);
- More generally, throughout Nemesianus' Cynegetica, Martin detects other words and phrases that are borrowed from Virgil.

Toohey notes that Nemesianus' approach to hunting as a form of "escape" may be indebted to Virgil's Eclogue 10 (lines 55 - 61), in which Gallus is depicted as considering hunting to be an escape from lovesickness.

=== Ancient and Medieval References to the Text ===
Nemesianus' Cynegetica is briefly referred to in the Historia Augusta. Hincmar of Reims apparently read it in his youth (early 9th century).

== Transmission and Editions ==
=== Transmission ===
Three medieval manuscripts of the Cynegetica exist. The earliest existing manuscript was produced in around 825. It is likely that all three manuscripts descend from a common archetype (which is now lost).

The Cynegetica is generally considered to have been transmitted in an incomplete state. Reasons for this conclusion include the fact that its proemium/introduction seems disproportionately long (102 out of a total 325 lines), and the fact that Nemesianus (at lines 237-8) indicates that he will give a further description of a Tuscan dog (but such subsequent description does not appear in the remainder of the surviving text).

The first printed edition of the Cynegetica was printed in Venice, in 1534.

=== 20th/21st Century Editions and Translations ===
- Duff, J.W. and Duff, A.M. (1934) Minor Latin Poets (Vol 2) - Loeb Classical Library - with English translation (excerpted version available online )
- Williams, H.J. (1986) Eclogues and Cynegetica of Nemesianus - with introduction, critical apparatus and commentary
- van de Woestijne, P. (1937) Les Cynégétiques de Némesién edition critique - with omnium verborum
- Volphilac, P. (1975) Némesién Oeuvres - with French translation and commentary
- Martin, D. (1917) The Cynegetica of Nemesianus - with introduction and commentary (available online )
- Jakobi, R. (2014) Nemesianus >Cynegetica< Edition und Kommentar - with introduction and German commentary

== Bibliography ==
- Anderson, J.K. (1985). Hunting in the ancient world. Berkeley: University of California Press. pp. 129, 139. ISBN 0520051971.
- Aymard, Jacques (1951). Essai sur les chasses romaines : des origines à la fin du siècle des Antonins (Ph.D.). Bibliothèque des Ecoles françaises d'Athènes et de Rome. p. 109.
- Browning, R. (1983). "Poetry". In Kennedy, E.J.; Clausen, W.V. (eds.). The Cambridge history of classical literature. Vol.2. [Latin literature] Pt.5. The later principate (1. pbk. ed.). Cambridge: Cambridge University Press. p. 11. ISBN 0521273714.
- Curcio, G. (1907), Rivista di Fil. 27, p. 447
- Duff, J.W.; Duff, A.M. (1934). Minor latin poets. Vol. II. Cambridge: Harvard University Press. ISBN 0674994787.
- Fiegl, M. (1820), Des Gratius Fal. Cynegetica, seine Vorgager und seine Vorganger und seine Nach folger
- Hornblower, Simon; Spawforth, Antony, eds. (2003). The Oxford classical dictionary (3. ed.). Oxford: Oxford University Press. p. 1033. ISBN 9780198606413.
- Jakobi, Rainer (2013). Nemesian, Cynegetika. Berlin: De Gruyter. ISBN 9783110265996.
- Martin, Donnis (1917). The Cynegetica of Nemesianus (Ph.D.). Cornell University.
- Reeve, M.D. (1983). "Nemesianus, Cynegetica". In Reynolds, Leighton D.; Wilson, N.G. (eds.). Texts and transmission : a survey of the Latin classics. Oxford: Clarendon Press. ISBN 0198144563.
- Toohey, Peter (1996). Epic lessons : an introduction to ancient didactic poetry (1st ed.). London: Routledge. ISBN 0415088976.
- Williams, H.J. (1986). The Eclogues and Cynegetica of Nemesianus. Leiden: E.J. Brill. ISBN 9789004074866.
