= Eclogues of Calpurnius Siculus =

Collection of Latin poetry attributed to Calpurnius Siculus

The Eclogues is a collection of Latin poetry attributed to Calpurnius Siculus and inspired by the similarly named poems of the Augustan-age poet Virgil.

The date of writing is disputed. Some scholars argue in favor of a Neronian date (54–68 AD), while others arguing for a later date (possibly during the reign of Severus (193–211 AD)).

== Form and structure ==
The Eclogues consist of seven separate poems, each written in hexameters:

- Eclogue I (94 lines)
- Eclogue II (100 lines)
- Eclogue III (98 lines)
- Eclogue IV (169 lines)
- Eclogue V (121 lines)
- Eclogue VI (93 lines)
- Eclogue VII (84 lines)

Goodyear notes that "Calpurnius' book of eclogues has an intentionally patterned structure". Hubbard and others note that, whereas Virgil's Eclogues consists of an even number of poems (10) Calpurnius's Eclogues consists of an odd number of poems (7), enabling the creation of a sense of symmetry. Various symmetries and other patterns in the arrangement of the book have been identified:

- The arrangement of the poems into two thematic groups – a "panegyric group" alluding to the "real word" and politics (Eclogues I, IV and VII) and "pastoral poems proper... which more or less follow the line of Theocritean...and Virgilian bucolics..." (Eclogues II, III, V and VII).
- Eclogue II (featuring an amoebaean song contest) and Eclogue VI (which relates to an aborted amoebaean song contest), providing a middle frame around Eclogue IV, corresponding to Virgil's Eclogues III and VII.
- Poems with dialogue (Eclogues II, IV and VI) are interwoven with poems containing long monologues (Eclogues I, III, V and VII).
- Idealizing poems (Eclogues I, II, III) are followed by more realistic poems (Eclogues V, VI and VII), following the pivotal Eclogue IV.

== The poems ==
=== Eclogue I ===
==== Title ====
Eclogue I is inscribed Delos in certain editions.

==== Form ====
Eclogue I takes the form of a short dialogue between two brothers (Corydon and Ornytus), framing an ecphrasis of a poem purportedly written by the god Faunus which takes up 55 of the poem's 94 lines.

==== Synopsis ====
It is a sunny day in summer or early autumn, somewhere in the countryside; Corydon and Ornytus decide to take shade in a nearby grove, sacred to Faunus.

Corydon says that a woman called Leuce has recently been rejecting his sexual advances, and that he is therefore permitted to enter the holy place. Corydon suggests that Ornytus should sing a song and play the pipes, and Corydon explains that has recently been given a reed pipe made by someone called Ladon.

At the grove of Faunus, Ornytus notices that a poem has very recently been inscribed on a sacred beech tree. Ornytus is taller and so Corydon asks him to read out the poem to him.

The poem on the tree purports to be composed by Faunus. He declares the rebirth of a Golden Age, bringing a new era of peace; an end to political corruption; the restoration of law and order and happiness for people all across the world. There is a bright comet in the sky, which presages peace, and the reign of a new Caesar.

Corydon claims to be awestruck and praises Faunus. Ornytus suggests setting the poem to music and disseminating it, via a man called Meliboeus.

==== Commentary ====
Eclogue I alludes to many sources. Some scholars think it is modelled principally upon Virgil's Fourth Eclogue, which also heralds a new golden age. Hubbard considers that the poem, particularly the description of the comet, alludes to Lucan.

The concept of a poem written upon a tree, or on bark, is found in several earlier pastoral poems – some critics have argued that such reference to writing is a reflection of self-conscious literary belatedness.

=== Eclogue II ===
==== Title ====
Eclogue II is inscribed Crotale in certain editions.

==== Form ====
The poem starts with a 27 line narrative, followed by an amoebaean song contest between the characters Astacus and Idas. Each stanza in this exchange is 4 lines long, with the exception of the final exchange of 3 lines each. The poem ends with a further 3 line narrative.

==== Synopsis ====
Two youths, Idas (a shepherd) and Astacus (a gardener) are both in love with someone called Crotale (or Crocale, in some editions).

They meet by a spring, under some shade on a very hot day and decide to have a song contest, adjudicated by Thyrsis. An audience consisting of domestic and wild animals, shepherds, Faunus, Satyrs and nymphs is present. Natural forces such as rivers and winds pause. Although the youths had placed high stakes, Thyrsis declares that the prize should be glory alone.

Idas and Astacus take it in turns to sing about:

- the favour granted to them by various rustic gods;
- their respective agricultural skills;
- the dedications they would make to any god who brings Crocale/Crotale to them;
- the agricultural gifts that they would give to Crocale/Crotale;
- their respective youthful good looks; and
- orders for the next agricultural tasks of the day.

Thyrsis declares the song contest to be a draw.

==== Commentary ====
Although amoebaean song contests appear in earlier extant pastoral poetry, some scholars have noted that the fact that the song contest is a declared a draw seems to be a novel feature – possibly indicating that Idas and Astacus are intended to be portrayed as ideal singers/poets.

Karakasis notes that, although Eclogue II is the only poem of Calpurnius that remains faithful to the traditional pastoral song-contest form, it can be construed as a deconstruction of the pastoral canon – citing (among other things) the introduction of characters with names unprecedented in previous pastoral poems and the use of epic, elegiac and georgic allusions, language and imagery.

=== Eclogue III ===
==== Synopsis ====
Two cowherds – Iollas and Lycidas – meet. Iollas asked Lycidas whether he has seen one of his heifers, which has gone missing. Lycidas replies that he is too distracted by his love for Phyllis, who has left him for someone called Mopsus. Iollas tells a certain Tityrus to keep looking for the missing heifer, and asks Lycidas in the meantime to tell him more about his break-up with Phyllis.

Lycidas explains that he was overcome by jealousy, after seeing Phyllis and Mopsus singing and playing pan pipes together, and that he physically abused Phyllis.

Iollas recommends that Lycidas apologises, and offers to pass the message on to Phyllis. Lycidas says that he was thinking of writing Phyllis a song or poem to win her back. Iollas asks Lycidas to recite the poem, whilst he transcribes it on some tree bark.

Lycidas recites how sad he is without Phyllis, and how happy he will be if she returns to him. He explains that he is superior to Mopsus in musical skill, looks and wealth. He explains that he cannot work without Phyllis. He explains that, if Phyllis is afraid that he might beat her, he shall have his hands bound (and reminds her of a time when Mopsus's own hands were bound, after he was caught thieving). He tells of the gifts of flowers he used to bring to Phyllis, and further mocks Mopsus. He threatens to hang himself if Phyllis does not return to him, and that a poem will be inscribed upon the tree from which he is hanged, telling of the affair.

Lycidas then tells Iollas to tell the poem/song to Phyllis, whilst he hides nearby. Lycidas agrees – but then remarks that, as a propitious omen, Tityrus has returned with the missing heifer.

==== Commentary ====
Some scholars consider Eclogue III to have an "elegiac character". More specifically, Karakasis notes that the "generic interaction" between pastoral and elegy is achieved through "the adoption of language, style and motifs of elegiac provenance...[and] also through the systematic imitation of Vergilian pastoral passages marked by clear elegiac qualities".

Haupt considered that Eclogue III predated the other Eclogues, on the basis of its meter and style.

Keene considers this poem to be an imitation of Virgil's Eclogue VII and Theocritus Idylls 3, 14 and 23.

Garson considers that certain elements of Lycidas's poem – principally those denigrating Phyllis's new lover, Mopsus – parody classical forensic oratory.

Korzeniewski suggests that Eclogue III is influenced by the plot of Menander's Perikeiromene.

=== Eclogue IV ===
==== Title ====
Eclogue IV is inscribed Caesar in certain editions.

==== Form ====
The poem consists of:

- an introductory 81 line dialogue between Corydon and Meliboeus (each character's stanzas are of irregular length);
- a 65 line amoebaean song exchange between Corydon and his brother Amyntas (each stanza is 5 lines long);
- a final section (23 lines), in which all three characters speak (as with the introduction, each character's stanzas are of irregular length).

==== Synopsis ====
Meliboeus finds Corydon sitting under a plane tree, by a stream. Corydon explains that he is composing a poem/song in honour of the divine emperor. Meliboeus and Corydon discuss whether it is appropriate to compose such a poem in a rustic style. Corydon mentions that his brother, Amyntas, also writes similar poems/songs. This leads Meliboeus to remind Corydon that he used to tell Amyntas to abandon his compositions and to concentrate on his agricultural duties. However, Corydon says that times have now changed: there is a new divine emperor.

Corydon also says that it is because of Meliboeus himself that Corydon is able to enjoy a life in the woods, carefree, composing poetry/music rather than being exiled far away into obscurity. Corydon requests Meliboeus to favour, and perhaps edit, his work. Corydon also explains that a certain Iollas recently gave him a reed pipe, which was once owned by Tityrus. Meliboeus and Corydon agree that Tityrus was a very talented singer.

Meliboeus encourages Corydon to perform his poem/song (noting that such a political poem must be weightier in style than songs in praise of a certain Alexis). As Corydon's brother, Amyntas, has arrived – Meliboeus suggests that they sing in turns.

In the course of an amoebaean song exchange, Corydon and Amyntas praise the emperor, attributing godlike qualities to him and stating that he has brought fertility, prosperity and peace to the land and wish him a long reign.

When the brothers have finished, Meliboeus remarks that, whilst he used to think that their poems/songs were uncouth and rustic, he thinks that the brothers have sung very sweetly – and that he prefers it to the nectar that Paelignian bees like to taste.

Corydon hints that he would like his own farm, in contrast to his current life of rustic labour and asks Meliboeus to take his poetry/songs to the emperor. Corydon says that this would put Meliboeus in the same position as the person who led Tityrus to the city and encouraged him to leave behind the sheepfold, and sing of the countryside and, subsequently, of war.

Amyntas thinks this sounds good, but says that they should prepare a meal. Meliboeus tells them to take their sheep to the river, as it is midday.

==== Commentary ====
Some scholars view Eclogue IV as being a programmatic dramatisation of Calpurnius's place in the literary tradition, and some attribute an even more direct autobiographical significance to it.

Some scholars consider the lengthiness of the introduction, preceding the songs of Corydon and Amyntas, as a technical flaw.

Some scholars think that the character of Tityrus represents Virgil and that Tityrus's patron (unnamed in the poem, but to whom Meliboeus is compared) must be Maecenas. Such reasoning is based inter alia on i) the identification of Tityrus with Virgil in ancient readings of Virgil's Eclogues and ii) Corydon's reference to Tityrus's ascent from the sheepfold (ovili) to songs about the countryside (rura) and then to war (arma) – which alludes to Virgil's progression from Eclogues (pastoral poetry), to the Georgics (a didactic poem about farming) and then to the Aeneid (epic war poetry).

Meliboeus's favourable comparison to the nectar of Paelignian bees, is seen by some scholars as being an aspirational reference to Ovid (who was born into the Paeligni tribe).

Karakasis notes the use of post-classical/post Augustan language (particularly in lines spoken by Meliboeus and, to a lesser extent, Corydon) and considers this to be a sign of linguistic innovation, reflecting the "generic novelty" and "unpastoral trends" of the poem.

=== Eclogue V ===
==== Form ====
After a 4 line narrative introduction, the rest of the poem consists of a single 137 line monologue.

==== Synopsis ====
An old man, Micon (or Mycon, in some editions) and his foster son or protege, Canthus, are resting in the shade of a tree. Micon recites a monologue about goat and sheep herding.

Micon explains that, as he is frail with age, he is handing his flock on to Canthus, and is therefore going to tell Canthus how to look after them:

- In spring, the flock must be led out of its winter fold for the mating season;
- However, the goats and sheep must not be sent to pasture until the necessary rites have taken place: an altar must be built and an animal sacrificed.
- The flocks should be milked in the morning and evening (and the milk processed into cheese the next morning). However, it is important to make sure there is enough milk for the lambs;
- Lambs and ewes that have just given birth need to be cared for;
- In spring, the flock should not graze too far away from the homestead: The weather is changeable – and when it rains, the rivers can swell and wash away lambs;
- In summer, the weather is more stable – and the flock can graze further afield. The flock should be sent out to pasture early in the morning as, when it gets hot, the animals should be taken to the water and shade. Later still, they should be put to pasture again, and not penned up in the sheepfold until it is much later;
- When it is the season for sheep shearing – make sure that the different types of sheep are properly branded and sorted, so that different types of wool don't get mixed up;
- Sometimes sheep get wounded by shears and/or develop a serious infection. Sulphur, sea leak, bitumen, ointments should be used as remedies;
- Sheep should be branded so as to avoid litigation;
- In the dry season, the folds and huts should be fumigated, as a measure against poisonous snakes;
- As winter approaches, around the time of the grape harvest, branches and leaves should be pruned and collected for later use as fodder and bedding.

Micon explains that he has more advice to give, but it is now late.

==== Commentary ====
Although Virgil's Eclogues are Calpurnius's principal sources/models, Eclogue V is a didactic poem inspired by Virgil's Georgics – in particular Georgic III or, as MacKail puts it, it is "a brief Georgic made formally a pastoral by being put into the mouth of an old shepherd sitting in the shade at midday".

Davis considers that Eclogue V's focus on making use of nature, and on safeguarding legal ownership rights (to avoid lawsuits) is a new feature in pastoral literature.

Rosenmeyer considers that the way in which Eclogue V arranges the tasks of a herdsman in accordance with the seasons and environment, demonstrates an organisational technique found in Hesiod's Works and Days.

Some scholars consider Eclogue V to be metaphor for poetic succession and inheritance (much like the pastoral trope of one shepherd passing on his pipe to another).

=== Eclogue VI ===
==== Title ====
Eclogue VI is entitled Litigium in some editions.

==== Synopsis ====
Astylus (or Astilus, in some editions) informs Lycidas that Nyctilus and Alcon recently had a song contest. Nyctilus had pledged some goat kids and their mother, Alcon had pledged a puppy of [a] Lioness (catulum... laeanae) (different editors and other scholars differ as to whether this simply refers to a puppy whose mother was called Laeana, a big or fierce dog breed, or whether it is an actual dog/lion crossbreed). Alcon won the contest.

Lycidas finds it unbelievable that Alcon could have won a song contest against Nyctilus, but Astylus insists on Alcon's skill. The debate becomes increasingly heated, and Lycidas challenges Astylus to a song contest – Astylus mocks him in response. Lycidas suggests that Mnasyllus (who has just turned up at the scene) should act as judge.

Astylus, is contemptuous of Lycidas and pledges a tame and beautiful stag (even though he is dear to his beloved, Petale). Lycidas pledges a fine horse called Petasos.

Mnasyllus agrees to judge the contest. The contestants go to a quiet cave. Mnasyllus suggest that, instead of arguing further, Astylus and Lycidas should sing about their respective beloveds, Petale and Phyllis.

Lycidas requests that Mnasyllus should judge them by the same standards as he did in an earlier contest between Astylus and Ancanthus. This seems to provoke further confrontation between Astylus and Lycidas, and each makes insinuations about each other: Astylus says he is looking forward to the public revelations of certain unspecified misdeeds of Lycidas, Lycidas indirectly accuses Lycidas of kissing a boy or man called Mopsus. Astylus suggests that, were it not for the fact that Mnasyllus is around, he would smash up Lycidas's face.

Mnasyllus says he has had enough of their squabbling and that he is no longer interested in acting as judge – he suggests that Micon (in some editions Mycon) and Iollas, who have just turned up, might be able to end the fight.

==== Commentary ====
Although the poem is a trialogue, and the song contest itself is aborted, some commentators describe Eclogue VI as being in amoebaean in form

Duff and Duff describe this Eclogue as a "weakish imitation" of Theocritus's Idylls IV and V and Virgil's Eclogue III.

Leach views Astylus and Lycidas's arguments over each other's poetic abilities as having "some of the function of an ars poetica for Calpurnius' book", and considers that the poem enacts the contrast between two different modes of pastoral poetry: precious and refined, vs rough and natural.

=== Eclogue VII ===
==== Title ====
Eclogue VII is entitled Templum in some editions. This is perhaps a mistake for Theatrum.

==== Synopsis ====
Corydon has just returned to the country, having stayed in the city for 20 nights. Lycotas tells him that he has been missed. Corydon mocks Lycotas for preferring trees to the sights exhibited by the young god (i.e. emperor) in the arena. Lycotas notes that the people in the countryside had continued to make music, in Corydon's absence. Lycotas dismisses such rustic entertainments and rites, in favour of the delights of the city. Lycotas asks Corydon to tell him more.

Corydon tells him about his visit to the theatre. He explains how, as he marveled at the sights, and old man (clearly more familiar with the city than Corydon) told him that even he was amazed by the show, which surpassed earlier entertainments. Corydon describes the architecture and decorations of the theatre, and the many animals on show, some of which would leap out of trapdoors in the floor of the arena itself.

Lycotas is envious of Corydon's youth and asks if Corydon managed to catch sight of the god (i.e. emperor) himself, and asks him to describe him.

Corydon mentions that, as he was dressed in his peasant clothes, he was unable to get close enough to get a good view. However, he thought that the emperor had the face of Mars and Apollo combined.

==== Commentary ====
Some scholars view Eclogue VII as a rewriting or "conscious inversion" of Virgil's Eclogue I.

Hubbard describes Eclogue VII as "a rejection of the pastoral life and vision".

Different scholars have attempted to identify the theatre described in Eclogue VII with different historical theatres in Rome. Merivale, Gibbon and (more recently) Hubbard identify it with the Colosseum (referring to the mosaics and marble walls described in Eclogue VII); Keene and Armstrong identify it with Nero's earlier wooden amphitheatre.

== Editions and Translations ==
- Haupt, M. De Carminibus bucolicis Calpurnii et Nemesiani (1854)
- Schenkl, H. (1885), with full introduction and index verborum
- Duff, J.W. and Duff, A.M. (1934) Minor Latin Poets (Vol 1) – Loeb Classical Library – with English translation (excerpted version available online)
- Amat, J. (1991) Calpurnius Siculus Bucoliques; Pseudo-Calpurnius, Eloge de Pison – with French translation
- Keene, C.H. (1887) The Eclogues of Calpurnius Siculus and M. Aurelius Olympius Nemesianus - with introduction, commentary and appendix (available online)
- Scott, E.J.L. (1891) – English verse translation (available online)
