= Eclogue =

Poetry and music genre

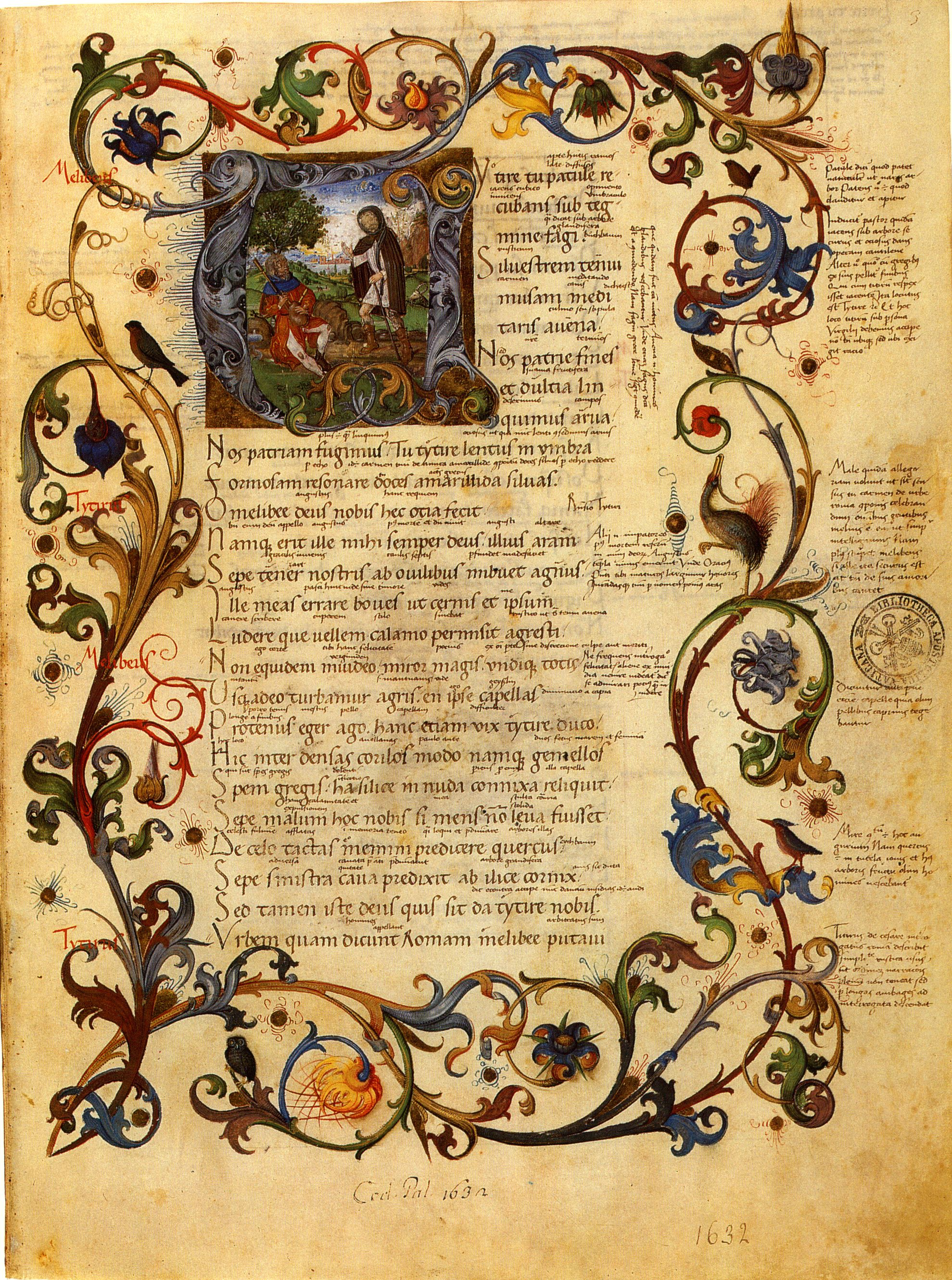
The beginning of Virgil's Eclogues, 15th century manuscript, Vatican Library

An eclogue is a poem in a classical style on a pastoral subject. Poems in the genre are sometimes also called bucolics. The term is also used for a musical genre thought of as evoking a pastoral scene.

== Classical beginnings ==
The form of the word eclogue in contemporary English developed from Middle English eclog, which came from Latin ecloga, which came from Greek eklogē (ἐκλογή) in the sense 'selection, literary product' (which was only one of the meanings it had in Greek). The term was applied metaphorically to short writings in any genre, including parts of a poetic sequence or poetry book.

As a genre of poetry, eclogues began with the Latin poet Virgil, whose collection of ten Eclogae was ultimately modelled on the Idylls of Theocritus. and was alternatively termed Bucolica. Found there was a sophisticated mixture of pastoral dialogues, song contests and contemporary references. Virgil's term was used by later Latin poets to refer to their own pastoral poetry, often in imitation of Virgil, as in the cases of the Eclogae of Calpurnius Siculus and the Eclogae of Nemesianus. Calpurnius also employed rustic vocabulary and archaic expressions to add to their distancing effect.

== In Britain ==
The practice of writing eclogues was extended by the 15th century Italian humanists Baptista Mantuanus and Jacopo Sannazaro whose Latin poetry was imitated in a variety of European vernaculars during the Renaissance, including in English. However, "the first Renaissance bucolic poem written in England" was a 1497 eclogue in Latin by Johannes Opicius in praise of Henry VII. Written in the form of a dialogue between the shepherds Mopsus and Melibœus, praising the ruler of the country for bringing back a Golden Age of prosperity and safety, the poem was modelled on the first of Virgil's Eclogues in praise of Octavian and the first eclogue by Calpurnius Siculus in praise of Nero. So far as is known, the poem remained in manuscript and even the first eclogues written in the English language by Alexander Barclay remained unpublished until about 1514. These were written earlier and adapted from 15th century Latin originals by Mantuanus and Aeneas Silvius.

Edmund Spenser was also inspired by Mantuan's eclogues, as well as by Virgil and Theocritus, when he composed the Shepheardes Calendar (1579), a series of twelve eclogues, one for each month of the year. Each is titled an Aegloga and contains for the most part dialogues by different speakers on a variety of subjects. In the background too is the example of Calpurnius, manifested here in the antiquated vocabulary drawn from John Skelton and Geoffrey Chaucer. Behind the plain (but far from unlettered) language there is vigorous allusion to contemporary events, particularly the proposed marriage between the queen and a Catholic Frenchman. Spenser's eclogues were youthful work, as were Alexander Pope's Pastorals, consisting of four shepherd dialogues divided between the seasons. They were originally composed in 1704 but first published in 1709; and to the 1717 edition, Pope added his originally intended "Discourse on Pastoral Poetry" in which he acknowledged the examples of Theocritus and Virgil ("the only undisputed authors of Pastoral") along with Spenser.

In between had come Phineas Fletcher's Piscatorie Eclogs (1633), imitations of Sannazaro's much earlier Eclogae Piscatoriae (Fishermen's eclogues, 1526), in which the traditional shepherds are exchanged for fishermen from the Bay of Naples. He was followed in this refocussing of the traditional subject matter in the following century by William Diaper, in whose Nereides: or Sea-Eclogues (1712) the speakers are sea-gods and sea-nymphs.

== Variations on the theme ==
By the early 18th century, the pastoral genre was ripe for renewal and an element of parody began to be introduced. John Gay ridiculed the eclogues of Ambrose Philips in the six 'pastorals' of The Shepherd's Week. The impulse to renewal and parody also met in the various "town eclogues" published at this time, transferring their focus from the fields to city preoccupations. The first was a joint publication by Jonathan Swift and his friends in The Tatler for 1710; John Gay wrote three more, as well as The Espousal, "a sober eclogue between two of the people called Quakers"; and Mary Wortley Montagu began writing a further six Town Eclogues from 1715.

In Scotland Allan Ramsay brought the novelty of Scots dialect to his two pastoral dialogues of 1723, "Patie and Roger" and "Jenny and Meggy", before expanding them into the pastoral drama of The Gentle Shepherd in the following year. Later the eclogue was further renewed by being set in exotic lands, first by the Persian Eclogues (1742) of William Collins, a revised version of which titled Oriental Eclogues was published in 1757. It was followed by the three African Eclogues (1770) of Thomas Chatterton, and by Scott of Amwell's three Oriental Eclogues (1782) with settings in Arabia, Bengal and Tang dynasty China.

In 1811 the fortunes of the Peninsular War brought the subject back to Europe in the form of four Spanish Eclogues, including an elegy on the death of the Marquis de la Romana issued under the pseudonym Hispanicus. These were described in a contemporary review as "formed on the model of Collins". In the following decade they were followed by a vernacular "Irish eclogue", Darby and Teague, a satirical account of a royal visit to Dublin ascribed to William Russell Macdonald (1787–1854).

== Musical genre ==
The term eclogue or its equivalents was eventually applied to pastoral music, with the first significant examples being piano works by the Czech composer Václav Tomášek. 19th century composers who adopted the title include Jan Václav Voříšek for piano; Franz Liszt, "Eglogue", the seventh piece in the first book of Années de Pèlerinage, 1842); César Franck, "Eglogue", op. 3, 1842, as well as the later eighth movement of the oratorio Ruth (1882), titled eglogue biblique, a setting of the words of Alexandre Guillemin; Antonín Dvořák, "4 eclogues for piano", Op. 56, 1880; Vítězslav Novák, Eklogen, Op. 11 for piano, 1896; and Mel Bonis, "Eglogue" for piano, Op. 12, 1898.

Two further pieces for solo piano followed in the new century: Egon Wellesz's "4 eclogues", Op. 11, 1912, and Jean Sibelius's Ekloge, the first of his "4 lyric pieces for piano", Op. 74, 1914. Similar titles were given the second and third movements of Igor Stravinsky's Duo Concertant ("Eclogue I" and "Eclogue II", 1932), while the middle movement of his three-movement Ode (1943) is also titled "Eclogue". Gerald Finzi's "Eclogue" for piano and string orchestra, Op. 10, was revised in the 1940s and given that title then. An "Eclogue" for horn and strings by Maurice Blower dates from about the 1950s.
