= Eclogue 4 =

Poem by Virgil

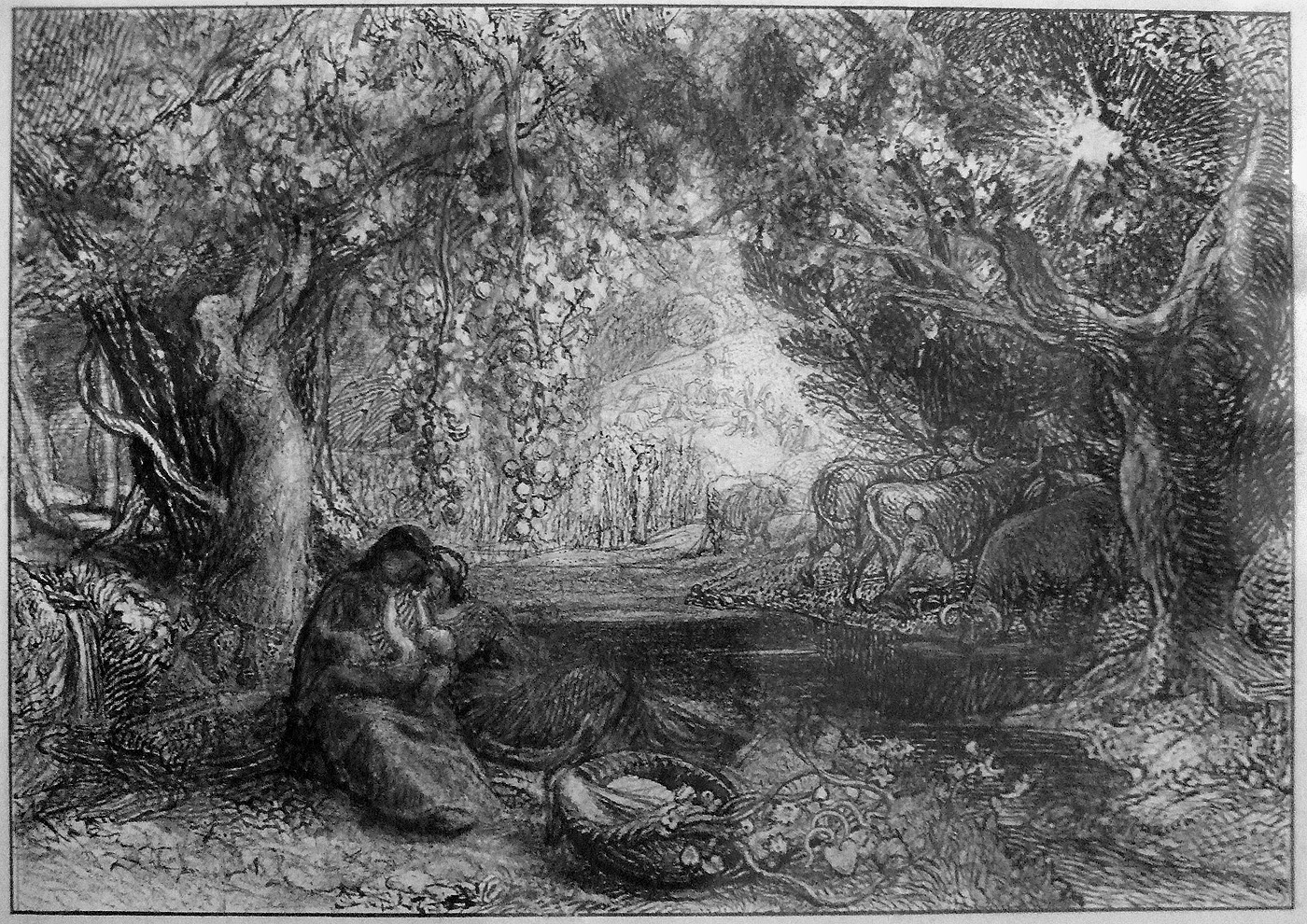
Samuel Palmer's pencil black and white landscape study, Eclogue IV: Thy Very Cradle Quickens (1876)

Eclogue 4, also known as the Fourth Eclogue, is a Latin poem by the Roman poet Virgil. The poem is dated to 40 BC by its mention of the consulship of Virgil's patron Gaius Asinius Pollio.

The work predicts the birth of a boy, a supposed savior, who—once he is of age—will become divine and eventually rule over the world. The exact meaning of the poem is still debated. Earlier interpretations argued that the child was the hoped-for offspring of Mark Antony and Octavia the Younger. Some commentators shy away from imagining the child as a specific person. Edwin Floyd, for example, argued that the child could be seen metaphorically as Virgil's poetry. Another possibility, argued by Francis Cairns, is that the child is the expected offspring of Virgil's patron Gaius Asinius Pollio, to whom the poem is dedicated.

In late antiquity and the Middle Ages, the poem was reinterpreted by Christians to be about the birth of Jesus Christ. Medieval scholars thus claimed that Virgil had predicted Christ prior to his birth, and therefore must have been a pre-Christian prophet. Notable individuals such as Constantine the Great, St. Augustine, Dante Alighieri, and Alexander Pope believed in this interpretation of the eclogue. Modern scholars by and large shy away from this interpretation, although Floyd does note that the poem contains elements of religious and mythological themes, and R. G. M. Nisbet concluded that it is likely that Virgil was indirectly inspired by the Hebrew Scriptures via Eastern oracles.

== Overview ==
=== Background ===
The Eclogues (from the Greek word for "selections"), also known as Bucolics, are a group of ten hexameter poems partly modelled on the bucolic hexameters ("pastoral poetry") of the Hellenistic poet Theocritus. The biographical tradition asserts that Virgil began the Eclogues in 42 BC and it is thought that the collection was published around 39–38 BC, although this date is controversial. The fourth of these Eclogues can be dated to around 41 to 40 BC, during a time "when the clouds of civil war seemed to be lifting".

=== Synopsis ===
The 63-line poem (the shortest of the Eclogues) begins with an address to the Muses. The first few lines have been referred to as the "apology" of the poem; the work, much like Eclogue 6, is not so much concerned with pastoral themes, as it is with cosmological concepts, and lines 1–3 defend this change of pace. In lines 4–5, the speaker refers to the Cumaean Sibyl as the source for his unfolding prophecy concerning the magnus saeclorum ordo, or "great order of the ages". The following lines (ll. 5–10) introduce a cluster of ideas: Hesiod's Ages of Man; the concept of a magnus annus, or the "Great Year" that begins a great "golden" age; the Italian idea of saecula; Plato's idea that there is a periodic rule of Saturn; and finally "eastern messianic" views similar to those found in the Sibylline Oracles, a collection of supposed oracular utterances written in Greek hexameters ascribed to the prophetesses who uttered divine revelations in a frenzied state.

"Now is come the last age of the Cumaean prophecy:
The great cycle of periods is born anew.
Now returns the Maid, returns the reign of Saturn:
Now from high heaven a new generation comes down.
Yet do thou at that boy's birth,
In whom the iron race shall begin to cease,
And the golden to arise over all the world,
Holy Lucina, be gracious; now thine own Apollo reigns."

— Eclogue 4 (ll. 4–11), as translated by John William Mackail; in this section the poem makes reference to the Cumaean Sibyl, the birth of a savior child, and the dawning of the Golden Age.

Line 10 concludes with a reference to the god Apollo, a deity who would be elevated to a special place in the Roman pantheon during the rule of Augustus: tuus iam regnat Apollo ("Your Apollo now is ruling"). John Miller cautions, however, that this mention of Apollo—while the god's first "saecular [sic] appearance" in Latin literature—should not be read unequivocally as an allusion to Octavian, because c. 40 BC, both Octavian and Mark Antony were associated with the god, and that the former did not, at the time, enjoy "a monopoly on Apolline symbolism." R. G. M. Nisbet argued that the rule of Apollo (regnat Apollo) mentioned in line 10 should not be seen as contradicting the rule of Saturn (Saturnia regna) mentioned in line 6; they are merely expressing the same general idea using two different cosmological outlooks. The former is adhering to a newer, non-Hesiodic model, whereas the latter is referring to the older, Hesiodic version.

Both lines 11 and 13–14 mention Gaius Asinius Pollio's leadership, but line 11 refers to his consulship at the time of the poem's writing, whereas lines 13–14 seem to refer to a time when Pollio will "still be alive and prominent in the State when the child is well-grown" and when the Golden Age will have arrived. Lines 15–17 reveal that the child will become divine and eventually rule over the world. Lines 18–45 provide coverage of the boy's growth. At first, the child, in the cradle, will be allowed to enjoy munuscula, or little gifts. Importantly, the boy will grow skilled in reading, learning of the deeds of both heroes and his father. At this point in his life, the Golden Age will not have arrived in full; there will still be both sailing and walled towns, and thus, still war. Jenny Strauss Clay noted that the poem implies that the whole Heroic Age will have to be replayed; a new band of Argonauts will travel the seas, and a new Trojan War will occur. Given time, the need for sailing will dissipate. Then, the ground will grow more fertile: grapes will grow from brambles, oak trees will produce honey, corn will emerge from the ground by itself, poisonous plants and animals will disappear, and useful animals will be improved. Only when the need for agriculture ends will the Golden Age begin.

Lines 53–57 feature the image of a singing poet, which is reminiscent of how the eclogue began. The poet himself will compete in a rustic environment against Orpheus and Linus, and Pan will be the judge. Virgil's reference to Linus in this section symbolizes "the symbiosis of Hesiodic song culture and erudite, 'bookish' poetics of the so-called Alexandrian poets", resulting in a "uniquely Virgilian pastoral aesthetic." Once the Golden Age will have arrived, the need for arms and soldiers will be obviated, and the competitive drive that—in the past—had fueled war will now fuel "harmless [poetic] competition for rustic prizes." In lines 60–63 Virgil addresses the child directly, urging him to smile at his mother, who has endured a long pregnancy. The final lines have proven throughout the ages to be a "fascinating problem", and there is no clear consensus as to what exactly they mean. Nisbet claims that the final line ("neither a god is worthy of his table, nor a goddess of his bed") is most likely a reference to a story about Hercules, who dined with Jupiter and took Juventas as his wife, although he noted it could also be a reference to a general Roman nursery saying.

== Interpretation ==
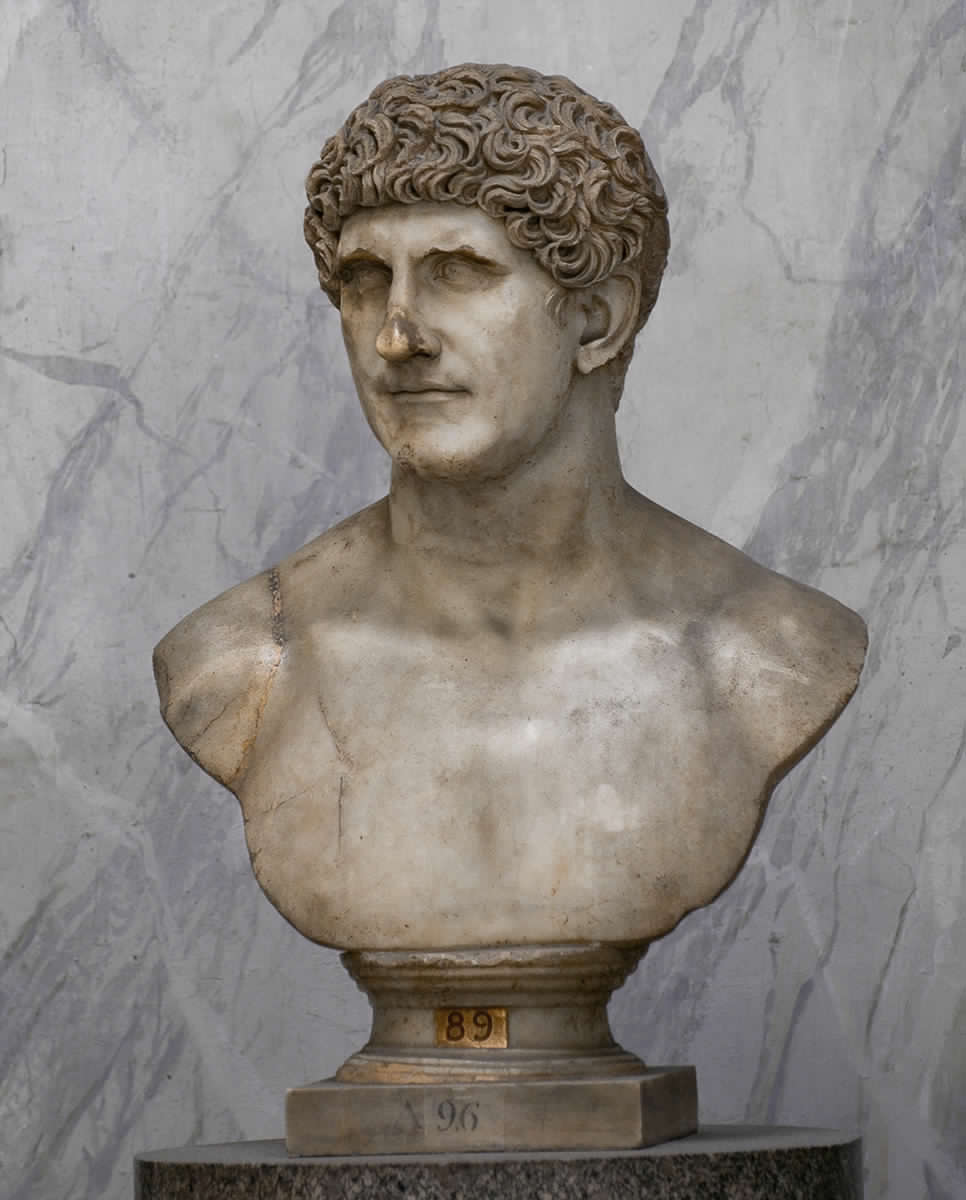
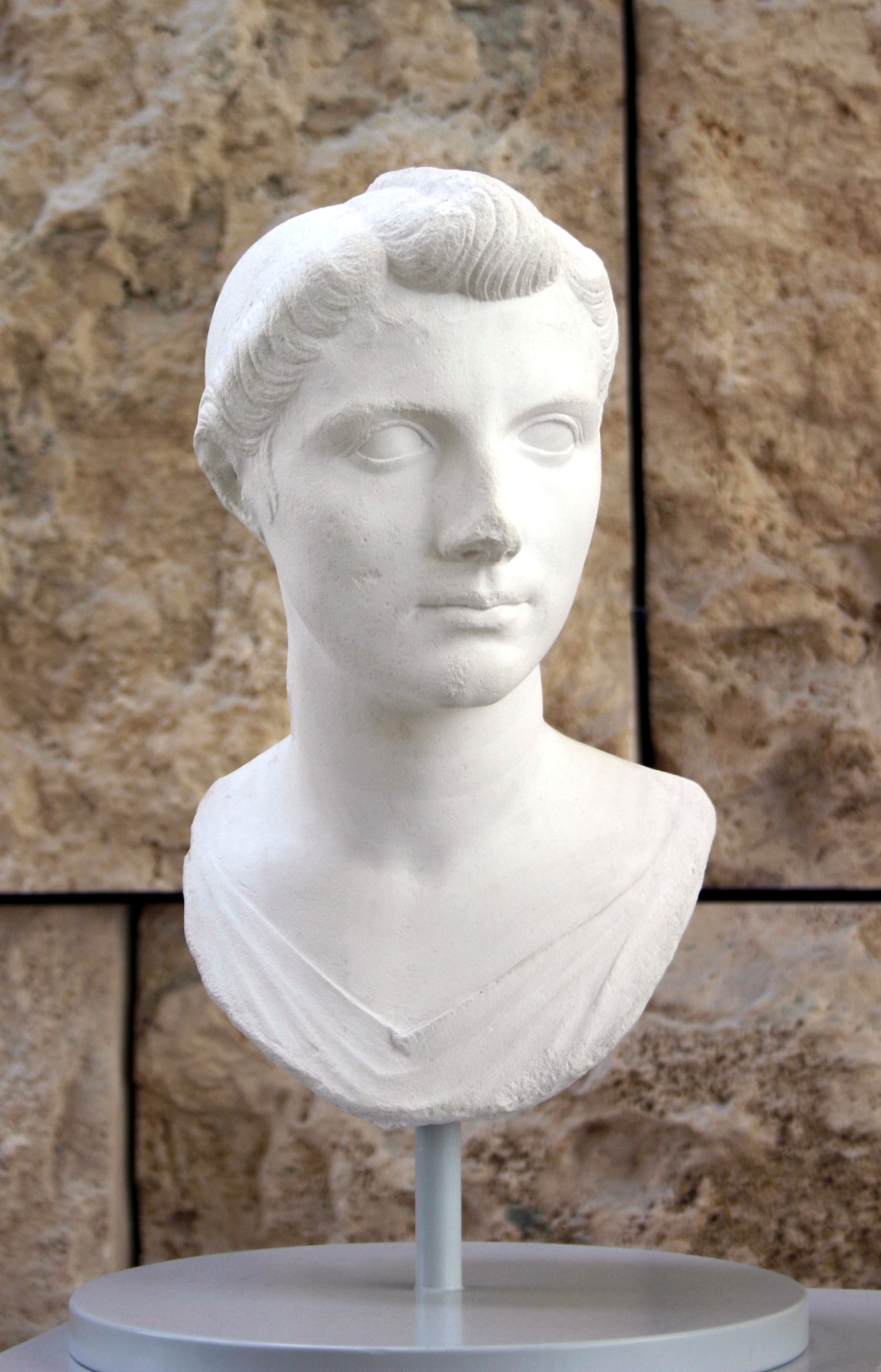
Some scholars believe that the child prophesied in the poem was the hoped-for offspring of Mark Antony (left) and his wife Octavia the Younger (right).

Grammarian and ancient Virgilian commentator, Maurus Servius Honoratus was one of the first to publish an interpretation of the poem, arguing that the entire work is a political allegory referring to the rule of the Princeps, although Miller points out that this is unlikely since the poem was written in 40 BC, prior to Octavian becoming Augustus.

For many years, a popular method in interpreting the poem was to see it as a cypher: many scholars attempted to deduce who exactly the child and his parents were. Some have proposed that the boy was supposed to be one of the sons of Pollio. A politician and patron of Virgil, Pollio was the father of two boys around the time of the Fourth Eclogue. The former died while in infancy, whereas the latter, Gaius Asinius Gallus Saloninus, died under the rule of Tiberius. Other scholars, however, felt that the child was more likely intended to be the male offspring of Mark Antony and Octavia the Younger. Wendell Clausen, for instance, posited that the word pacatum in line 17 is a reference to Hercules, a deity from whom Mark Antony claimed descent; this word, therefore, was used by Clausen as evidence that the poem was talking about a child of Antonian (and therefore, Herculean) descent. Interpreting the poem in this manner, however, has largely started to fall out of favor with modern scholars because, according to Bruce Arnold, "such interpretations usually rely either on broad considerations of genre or an analysis of small bits".

The poem has also been interpreted in more metaphorical ways. Some modern scholars believe that the poem celebrates the Treaty of Brundisium, which gave rise to the Second Triumvirate of Octavian, Mark Antony, and Marcus Aemilius Lepidus. Floyd, on the other hand, proposed that the puer mentioned throughout the poem is not an actual child, but rather Virgilian poetry itself. He noted that the word puer is elsewhere used by Virgil in the Eclogues to refer to shepherds, individuals who are closely associated with the art of poetry. Furthermore, he points out that the verb incipere, which is used three times in Eclogue 4, is itself associated with "poetic performances" in other Virgilian poems, like in Eclogue 3.58. Finally, Floyd—who subscribes to the theory that cui non risere parentes is what Virgil wrote—proposed that line 62 refers to a boy whose parents will smile, only "after due consideration", meaning that the child must earn its parents' smiles. Floyd goes on to argue that it makes sense for the parents to either be Virgil or the Muses, individuals whose smiles must be earned; the Muses are critical of those whom they inspire, whereas Virgil—as a meticulous artist—was critical of himself.

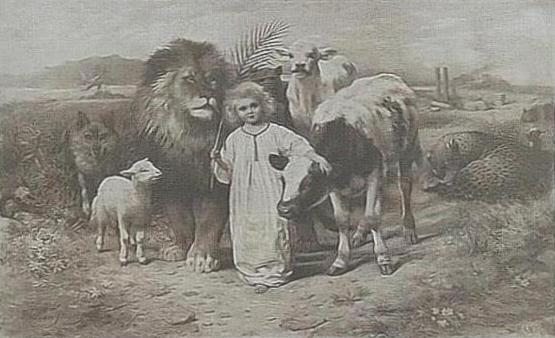
Some scholars claim that the poem was influenced by oracles, which were in turn inspired by the Book of Isaiah, as evidenced by line 22.

Line 22, which mentions that "the cattle will not fear huge lions", has been compared to both Isaiah 11:6 from the Hebrew Bible, which states that, "The calf and the young lion will grow up together and a little child will lead them", as well as a passage from the Sibylline Oracles 3.791-3, which reads: "The lion, devourer of flesh, will eat husks in the stall like an ox, and tiny children will lead them in chains." Rose proposed that, because Virgil was highly educated and had "a great taste for philosophic and quasi-philosophic studies", it is possible that he combined dozens of mystical and religious ideas in the poem, "joining Sibylline formulae to age-old beliefs about divine kings, taking hints from many doctrines of original sin … with astrological speculations of recent date, and coloring the whole with the theanthropic, or Messianic, expectations." Due to this synthesis of ideas, Rose points out that it is possible that Virgil used the Hebrew Scriptures for part of the poem's inspiration. Cyrus H. Gordon later noted that the Eclogues, along with the Aeneid, "reflect Egyptian, Semitic, and Anatolian, as well as Greek, antecedents".

Nisbet pointed out that the poem can be analyzed according to two different schools of thought: the "Easterners" (promoted notably by Eduard Norden) argue that the eclogue had to have been influenced by religions of the East, most notably Jewish messianism, whereas the "Westerners" (furthered by the work of Günther Jachmann) argue that the work was influenced largely by concepts familiar to the Greco-Roman West. Nisbet outlined reasons why certain sections, most notably the seemingly Isaian section in and around line 22, are best explained through the Easterners' method of interpretation. Other sections, however, such as lines 26–36—which Nisbet argued were written in a style akin to Greco-Roman prophecies (and whose wording suggests "the ideals of Virgil's own society")—should be viewed through the Westerners' lens. Ultimately, Nisbet concluded that Virgil was not interested in Jewish eschatology "for its own sake"; however, he probably appropriated elements from Jewish prophecy via Eastern oracles, and adapted them towards Western (which is to say, Roman) modes of thought.

== Textual criticism ==
=== Epithalamium-like nature ===
Clausen argued that the poem, were one to remove lines 1–3 and 58–9, would read much like an epithalamium, or a poem written specifically for a bride on the way to her marital chamber. However, the addition of the aforementioned lines changes the sense of the poem, making it pastoral. Thus, Clausen claims that Virgil himself added these new lines to tweak the poem and make it suitable for inclusion in the Eclogues.

=== Smiling baby ===
A major textual problem is in line 62, where all the manuscripts read cui non risere parentes ('for whom the parents have not smiled'). Most editors, however, have changed the text to qui non risere parentes ('those who have not smiled at their parents') or qui non risere parenti ('those who have not smiled for their parent'). One strong argument for making this change is that Virgil here seems to be imitating Catullus 61.219, where a baby is encouraged to smile sweetly at its father (dulce rideat ad patrem). Another argument is that where Quintilian 9.3.8 quotes the line, even though the manuscripts there also have cui, it seems certain from the point he is making about singular pronouns referring to plural antecedents that his text actually had qui.

Some commentators, such as Floyd (1997), have defended the manuscript reading. However, most scholars disagree with Floyd. Nisbet, for instance, writes, "It is clear from the structure and sense of the passage that the baby is doing the laughing and not the parents (that is to say, the cui of Virgil's manuscripts is impossible against the qui implied by Quintilian 9.3.8)." He instead contends that the baby not laughing at his parents is a hint to the reader that "the infant is out of the ordinary."

A related question is whether line 60 (incipe, parve puer, risu cognoscere matrem) means 'begin, little boy, to recognise your mother by her smile' or 'begin, little boy, to recognise your mother by your smile'. It is generally argued that the latter makes much better sense, not only from the context, but especially in view of the Catullus verse noted above.

== Acrostics and word play ==
According to Cicero, Sibylline oracles were traditionally accompanied by an acrostic, generally the so called "gamma acrostic" where the same word or phrase can be read across and down. Scholars looking for acrostics in Eclogue 4 have found two, or possibly three, acrostics. In 2017 Leah Kronenberg found a double-letter acrostic in the syllables DE CA TE which begin lines 9, 10, and 11, forming the Greek word δεκάτη (dekátē) 'tenth'. The same word can be read horizontally both backwards and forwards in line 11 (TEque Adeo DECus hoc Aevi TE consule inibit 'this glory of the age will enter with you (Pollio) as consul'). It is thought that δεκάτη here is short for δεκάτη γενεά (dekátē geneá) 'the tenth age or generation', a phrase which is in fact used in connection with the Sibylline prophecies by Phlegon of Tralles.

The number ten was associated with the Sibyl. There were said to be ten sibyls, and, before Sulla changed it to 15, the college of priests who guarded the Sibylline Books was originally ten in number. The number ten occurs again in this eclogue in the "ten months" of the mother's gestation (line 61) and it is implied in the beginning of the prophecy in the words "the last (i.e. tenth) age of Cumaean song has come" (line 4). The names of Lucina (goddess of childbirth) and Apollo (god of prophecy) are both placed in the 10th line of the poem.

The second acrostic, found in 2019, is also a double-letter one using a transliterated Greek word: AS TER AS (lines 50–52), forming the Greek word ἀστέρας 'stars'; the acrostic is confirmed by a horizontal AS TRA (i.e. ἄστρα, also meaning 'stars', hidden in line 51, as well as the word caelum 'sky' in the same line. The acrostic begins and ends with the word aspice 'behold!' in lines 50 and 52; thus is can be read as 'behold the stars'. The discoverer of this acrostic, Jerzy Danielewicz, points out that it is also possible to read the word AS TER (ἀστήρ 'star') three times in the acrostic, downwards, upwards, and right to left.

Another apparent acrostic, the Latin word CACATA, has long been observed in lines 47–52, but it is disputed by scholars whether it is intentional or an "embarrassing accident".

== Later Christian interpretation ==
By the thirteenth and fourteenth centuries AD, Virgil had gained a reputation as a virtuous pagan, a term referring to pagans who were never evangelized and consequently during their lifetime had no opportunity to recognize Christ, but nevertheless led virtuous lives, so that it seemed objectionable to consider them damned. Eventually, some Christians sought to reconcile Virgil's works, especially the Eclogues, with the supposed Christianity present in them. For instance, during the Late Antiquity and beyond, many assumed that the puer referenced in the Fourth Eclogue was actually Jesus Christ. Many noted individuals, such as Constantine the Great, St. Augustine, Dante Alighieri and Alexander Pope believed in this interpretation of the eclogue.

== Bibliography ==
- Arnold, Bruce (Winter 1994). "The Literary Experience of Vergil's Fourth 'Eclogue'". The Classical Journal. 90 (2). Classical Association of the Middle West and South: 143–160.
- Barolsky, Paul (2007). Michelangelo's Nose: A Myth and Its Maker. John Wiley & Sons. ISBN 9780271032726.
- Bourne, Ella (April 1916). "The Messianic Prophecy in Vergil's Fourth Eclogue". The Classical Journal. 11 (7). Classical Association of the Middle West and South: 390–400.
- Cairns, F. (2008). C. Asinius Pollio and the Eclogues". The Cambridge Classical Journal, Vol. 54 (2008), pp. 49–79.
- Clay, Jenny Strauss (2009). "Vergil 'Eclogue' 4.28: Where's the Miracle?". Vergilius. 55. The Vergilian Society: 13–16.
- Conte, Gian Biagio (1999). Latin Literature: A History. Johns Hopkins University Press. ISBN 9780801862533.
- Ebbeler, Jennifer (2010). "Linus as a Figure for Pastoral Poetics in Vergil's Eclogues". Helios. 37 (2). Texas Tech University Press: 187. Bibcode:2010Helio..37..187E. doi:10.1353/hel.2010.0016. S2CID 161669115.
- Floyd, Edwin (Fall 1997). "Vergil's Eclogue 4". The Explicator. 56 (1). Taylor & Francis: 3. doi:10.1080/00144949709595234.
- Fowler, Don (1996). "Virgil (Publius Vergilius Maro)". In Hornblower, Simon; Spawforth, Antony (eds.). The Oxford Classical Dictionary (3 ed.). Oxford. ISBN 9780198661726.
- Grandsen, K. W. (1992). "Poetry and Prophecy: The Beginnings of a Literary Tradition by James L. Kugel". The Classical Review. 42 (1). Cambridge University Press.
- Kronenberg, L. (2017). "The tenth of age of Apollo and a new acrostic in Eclogue 4". Philologus, 161(2), 337–339.
- Mackail, John William (2003). Virgil's Works: The Aeneid, Eclogues and Georgics. Kessinger Publishing. ISBN 9780766140141.
- Miller, John (2009). Apollo, Augusts, and the Poets. Cambridge University Press. ISBN 9780521516839.
- Morwood, James (2008). Virgil, A Poet in Augustan Rome. University of Cambridge Press. ISBN 9780521689441.
- Nisbet, R. G. M. (1978). "Virgil's Fourth Eclogue: Easterners and Westerners". Bulletin of the Institute of Classical Studies. 25 (1). Institute of Classical Studies: 59–78. doi:10.1111/j.2041-5370.1978.tb00385.x.
- Rose, H. J. (1924). "Some Neglected Points in the Fourth Eclogue". The Classical Quarterly. 18 (3/4). Classical Association: 113–118. doi:10.1017/S0009838800006960. S2CID 170727145.
- Scafoglio, Giampiero (2013). "Since the Child Smiles: A Note on Virg. Ecl. 4.62–3". The Classical Journal. 109 (1): 73–87. doi:10.5184/classicalj.109.1.0073. JSTOR 10.5184/classicalj.109.1.0073.
- Steenkamp, Johan (2011). "The Structure of Vergil's Eclogues". Acta Classica. 54. Classical Association of South Africa.
- Stuart, Duane Reed (1921). "On Vergil Eclogue iv. 60-63". Classical Philology. 16 (3). University of Chicago Press: 209–230. doi:10.1086/360358. S2CID 161338092.
- Virgil (1918). Carus, Paul (ed.). Virgil's Prophecy on the Saviour's Birth: the Fourth Eclogue. University of Michigan.
- Virgil (1984). Lee, Guy (ed.). The Eclogues. London, UK: Penguin Classics.
- Vitto, Cindy (1989). The Virtuous Pagan in Middle English Literature. American Philosophical Society. ISBN 9780871697950.
