= Titus Calpurnius Siculus =

Roman bucolic poet

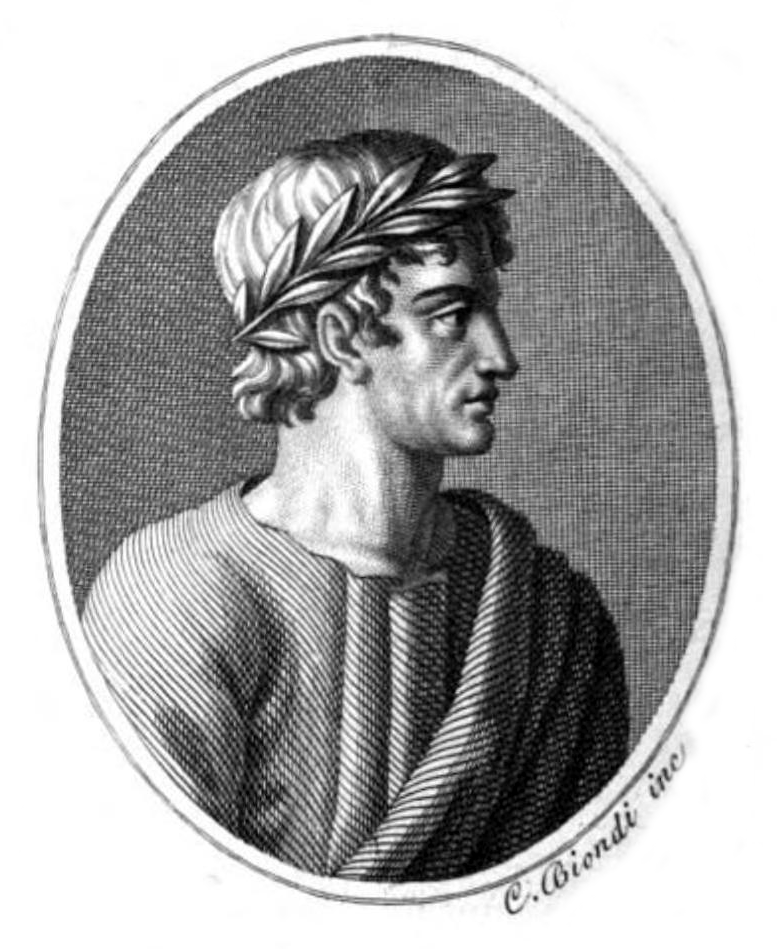
Portrait of Titus Calpurnius made in 1821

Titus Calpurnius Siculus was a Roman bucolic poet. Eleven eclogues attributed to him have survived, of which the last four, from metrical considerations and express manuscript testimony, are now generally attributed to Nemesianus, who lived in the time of the emperor Carus and his sons (latter half of the 3rd century). The separate authorship of the eclogues of Calpurnius and Nemesianus was established by Haupt.

== Controversy over date ==
There is no doubt that Calpurnius's eclogues post-date Virgil's eclogues, as Calpurnius is heavily indebted, and frequently alludes to Virgil. However, the period in which Calpurnius was active has been debated and there is no overriding consensus. Edward Gibbon placed him in the reign of Carus (282 – 283 AD). In the late nineteenth century, Haupt asserted that Calpurnius wrote during the reign of Nero (54 – 68 AD).

Evidence put forward for this Neronian dating includes the fact that, in Calpurnius's eclogues I, IV, and VII, the emperor is described as a handsome youth, like Mars and Apollo, whose accession marks the beginning of a new golden age, prognosticated by the appearance of a comet, which is argued to be the same that appeared some time before the death of Claudius; he exhibits splendid games in the amphitheatre (probably the wooden amphitheatre erected by Nero in 57); and in the words maternis causam qui vicit Iulis (Note: According to Freese (1911), Iulis for in ulnis according to the best MS. tradition.) (i.45) there is a reference to the speech delivered in Greek by Nero on behalf of the Ilienses (Suetonius, Nero, 7; Tacitus, Annals, xii.58), from whom the Julii derived their family.

In 1978 it was argued that Calpurnius was active in the reign of Severus (193 – 211 AD). Arguments for such later dating of Calpurnius's work are based on internal stylistic, metrical and lexical grounds – including what are considered by some to be allusions in Calpurnius's poetry to Flavian-era literature. There has been subsequent disagreement among scholars as to the date of Calpurnius's poetry, with some arguing for a Neronian Date, others for a later date.

== Life ==
Nothing is known of the life of Calpurnius with any certainty. Some scholars have argued that Calpurnius is represented, in his poetry, by the character of Corydon and have attempted to draw conclusions about Calpurnius's life from the life of Corydon portrayed in the eclogues.

From this it is deduced that Calpurnius was in poor circumstances and was on the point of emigrating to Spain, when a patron (represented in the poems by a certain Meliboeus) came to his aid. Through his influence Calpurnius apparently secured a post at Rome. The poet's patron, has been variously identified with Columella, Seneca the philosopher, and Gaius Calpurnius Piso. Although the sphere of Meliboeus's literary activity (as indicated in Eclogue iv.53) suits none of these, what is known of Calpurnius Piso fits in well with what is said of Meliboeus by the poet, who speaks of his generosity, his intimacy with the emperor, and his interest in tragic poetry. His claim is further supported by the poem De Laude Pisonis (ed. C.F. Weber, 1859) which has come down to us without the name of the author, but which there is considerable reason for attributing to Calpurnius, the other main contender being Lucan.

== Eclogues ==
The eclogues are a collection of Latin poetry attributed to Calpurnius Siculus. Of his models the chief is Virgil, of whom (under the name of Tityrus) he speaks with great enthusiasm; he is also indebted to Ovid and Theocritus.

== Laus Pisonis and Einsiedeln Eclogues ==
The Laus Pisonis exhibits a striking similarity with Calpurnius's eclogues in metre, language, and subject-matter. The author of the Laus is young, of respectable family and desirous of gaining the favour of Piso as his Maecenas. Further, the similarity between the two names can hardly be accidental; it is suggested that the poet may have been adopted by the courtier, or that he was the son of a freedman of Piso. The attitude of the author of the Laus towards the subject of the panegyricus seems to show less intimacy than the relations between Corydon and Meliboeus in the eclogues, and there is internal evidence that the Laus was written during the reign of Claudius (Teuffel-Schwabe, Hist. of Rom. Lit. 306,6).

Mention may here be made of the fragments of two short hexameter poems known as the Einsiedeln Eclogues, which share similarities with the poetry of Calpurnius.
