= Nemesianus =

Roman poet circa AD 283

Marcus Aurelius Nemesianus was a Roman poet thought to have been a native of Carthage and flourished about AD 283. He was a popular poet at the court of the Roman emperor Carus (Historia Augusta, Carus, 11).

== Bogus name "Olympius" ==
A bogus poet by the name of Olympius Nemesianus was mentioned in the Historia Augusta, where he was given authorship of two otherwise-unattested and probably imaginary works, Halieutica on fishing and Nautica on boating. It is likely that a gloss on the Historia Augusta noted the name "Cynegetica" in the margin in Greek letters, probably because the copyist recognized the name Nemesianus and wanted to use his limited knowledge of Greek; a later copyist moved it into the text of the Historia Augusta, and the name Olympius was conflated with the genuine Nemesianus.

== Works ==
The works below are by, or have been at times attributed to, Nemesianus:

=== Didactic poetry ===
Nemesianus wrote a poem on hunting (Cynegetica); a fragment, 325 hexameter lines, has been preserved. It is neatly expressed in good Latin, and was used as a school textbook by Hincmar of Reims in the 9th century AD. The spoof work Historia Augusta gives to "Olympius Nemesianus" a work on the arts of fishing (Halieutica) and one on sailing (Nautica).

Two fragments exist of a poem about bird catching (De aucupio), which are sometimes attributed to Nemesianus, although this attribution is considered doubtful.

=== The Eclogues ===
Four eclogues, formerly attributed to Titus Calpurnius Siculus, are now generally considered to be by Nemesianus.

=== The Praise of Hercules ===
The Praise of Hercules, sometimes printed in Claudian's works, may be by him.

== Editions ==
Complete edition of the works attributed to him in Emil Baehrens, Poetae Latini Minores, iii. (1881); Cynegetica: ed. Moritz Haupt (with Ovid's Halieutica and Grattius) 1838, and R. Stern, with Grattius (1832); Italian translation with notes by L. F. Valdrighi (1876). The four eclogues are printed with those of Calpurnius in the editions of H. Schenkl (1885) and Charles Haines Keene (1887); see L. Cisorio, Studio sulle Egloghe di Nemesiano (1895) and Dell' imitazione nelle Egloghe di Nemesiano (1896); and M. Haupt, De Carminibus Bucolicis Calpurnii et Nemesiani (1853), the chief treatise on the subject. The text of the Cynegetica, the Eclogues, and the doubtful Fragment on Bird-Catching were published in Vol. II of Minor Latin Poets (Loeb Classical Library with English translations (1934).

== See also ==
- Tiberianus (poet)
