= Magia =

Magia may refer to:

== Music ==
=== Albums ===
- Magia (Álvaro Soler album) or the title song (see below), 2021
- Magia (Jerry Rivera album) or the title song, 1995
- Magia (Maluma album) or the title song, 2012
- Magia (Shakira album) or the title song, 1991
- Magia (Toque Profundo album), 2002
- Magia, by Rosana, 2005

=== Songs ===
- "Magia" (Álvaro Soler song), 2021
- "Magia" (Kalafina song), 2011
- "Magia", by Gadiel featuring Yandel, 2016
- "Magia", by OV7, 2012
- "Magia", an ending theme from the TV series Grachi, 2011

== People ==
- Magia gens, a plebeian family of ancient Rome, including:
  - Magia, a wife of the poisoner Oppianicus
  - Magia Polla, mother of the poet Virgil

== Other ==
- Magia (planthopper), a genus of planthopper in the family Lophopidae
- Magia (Kamen Rider), a type of fictional character in Kamen Rider Zero-One
- Mágia, or Magic, a 1917 Hungarian drama film
- Magia FC, a National Premier Soccer League team in 2022

== See also ==
- Magic (disambiguation)
