= Jivatma =

Jivatma may refer to:

- Jiva, a life force in Hinduism and Jainism
- Jivatma, a monotypic leafhopper genus containing Jivatma metallica, in the tribe Lophopini
