= Pyrilla perpusilla =

Scientific classification
- Kingdom: Animalia
- Phylum: Arthropoda
- Clade: Pancrustacea
- Class: Insecta
- Order: Hemiptera
- Suborder: Auchenorrhyncha
- Infraorder: Fulgoromorpha
- Family: Lophopidae
- Genus: Pyrilla
- Species: P. perpusilla

Binomial name
- Pyrilla perpusilla (Walker, 1851)

Synonyms
- Dictyoptera pallida Stebbing (1903); Fulgora pallida Donovan (1800); Pyrops perpusilla; Zamila perpusilla Walker (1851)

Species of true bug

Pyrilla perpusilla, commonly known as the sugarcane planthopper, is a planthopper in the family Lophopidae. It is native to Asia where it feeds on grasses and other plants and is a major pest of sugarcane and sorghum.

== Description ==
The adult P. perpusilla has an elongated snout with piercing and sucking mouthparts, and a soft body, and is a yellowish-brown colour. Males have a wing-span of about 20 mm (0.8 in) and females are slightly smaller, averaging 17 mm (0.7 in). The eggs are ovoid, white to yellowish-green and about 2 mm (0.08 in) long. The nymphs are creamy-white and each instar stage has long filaments projecting near the anus.

== Distribution ==
P. perpusilla is native to southern Asia and occurs in Afghanistan, Bangladesh, Cambodia, China, India, Indonesia, Laos, Myanmar, Nepal, Pakistan, Sri Lanka, Thailand and Vietnam.

== Hosts ==
Besides sugarcane, this planthopper has been found feeding on other host plants, and breeding on some of them. These include maize, sorghum, pearl millet, barley, bitter melon, okra, Vietnamese luffa, watermelon, squash, rice, wild oat, pea and Indian thorny bamboo.

== Life cycle ==
Adult female P. perpusilla lay small batches of eggs on sugarcane leaves, mostly on the underside but sometimes on the upper surface, and during the winter, inside the leaf sheath. The eggs are laid in four or five rows and are protected with filaments of whitish wax protruded by the female. They hatch after six to thirty days depending on the time of year. The nymphs pass through five developmental stages, before moulting for a last time and becoming adult. Breeding commences eight or more days later. In Sri Lanka, fecundity in the female is about 133; females live longer than males but there is no overlap of generations because the longevity of the adults is less than the time taken for the nymphs to develop. In India, fecundity ranges up to 880, and the lifespan ranges from 14 to 200 days depending on climatological conditions.

== Ecology ==
The planthopper feeds on its host by inserting its stylet into a leaf and sucking out the phloem sap. Excess fluid is excreted as honeydew and sooty mould grows on it. The plant's vigour is reduced through the loss of sap and the reduction in photosynthesis resulting from the sooty mould. Brown patches appear on the leaves, which may also become discoloured. The leaves may wilt, later becoming desiccated and brown. In India, P. perpusilla has at least 16 species of natural invertebrate enemies; some of these are parasitoids attacking the eggs and young nymphs, while others are predators and parasitoids of older nymphs and adults. The most successful parasitoid seems to be the moth Epiricania melanoleuca, and it is being used in biological pest control of P. perpusilla.
