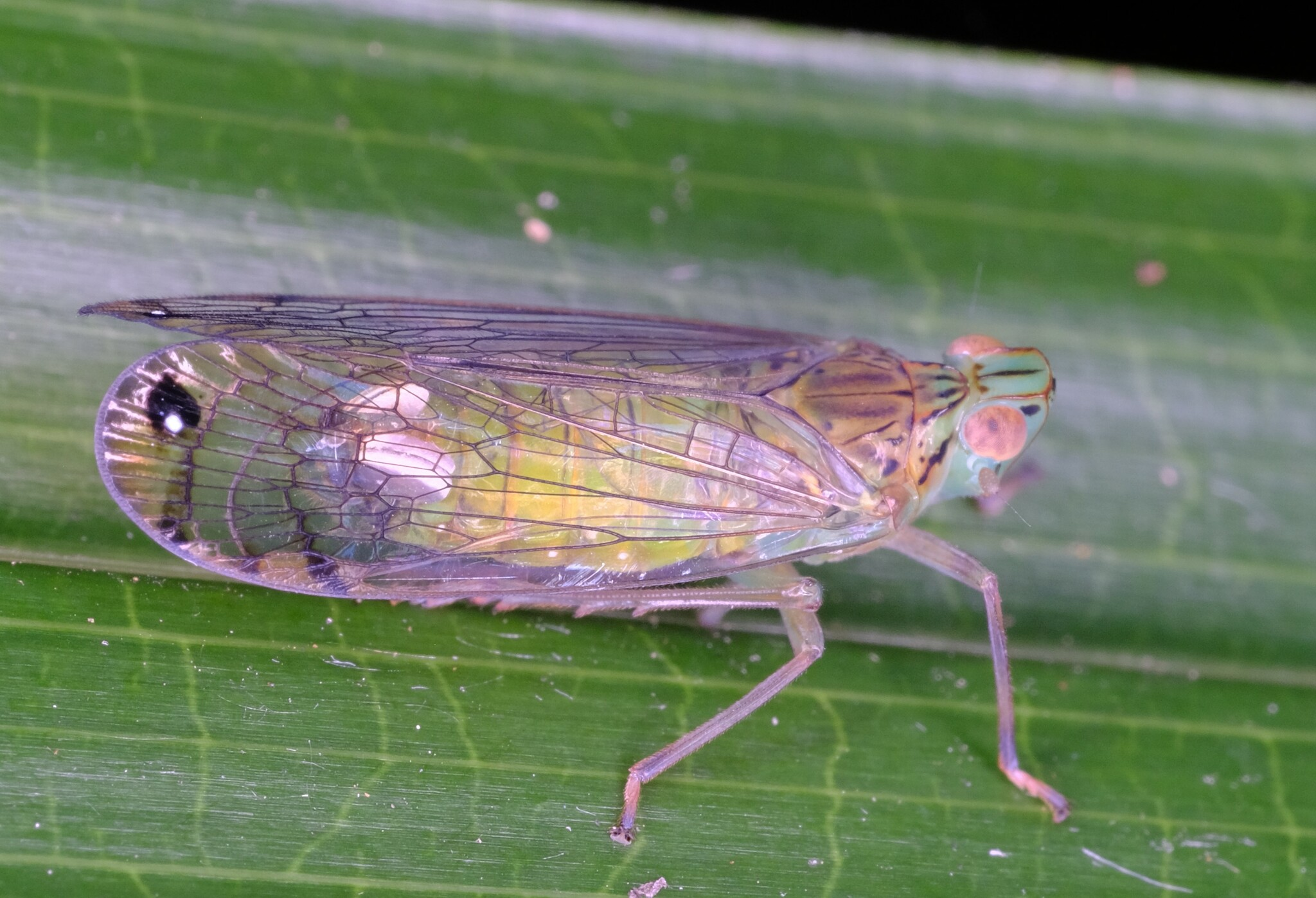

Scientific classification
- Kingdom: Animalia
- Phylum: Arthropoda
- Class: Insecta
- Order: Hemiptera
- Suborder: Auchenorrhyncha
- Infraorder: Fulgoromorpha
- Family: Lophopidae
- Genus: Magia
- Species: M. subocellata

Binomial name
- Magia subocellata Distant 1907

= Magia subocellata =

palm planthopper

Species of insect

Magia subocellata is a species of planthopper found in eastern Australia.
