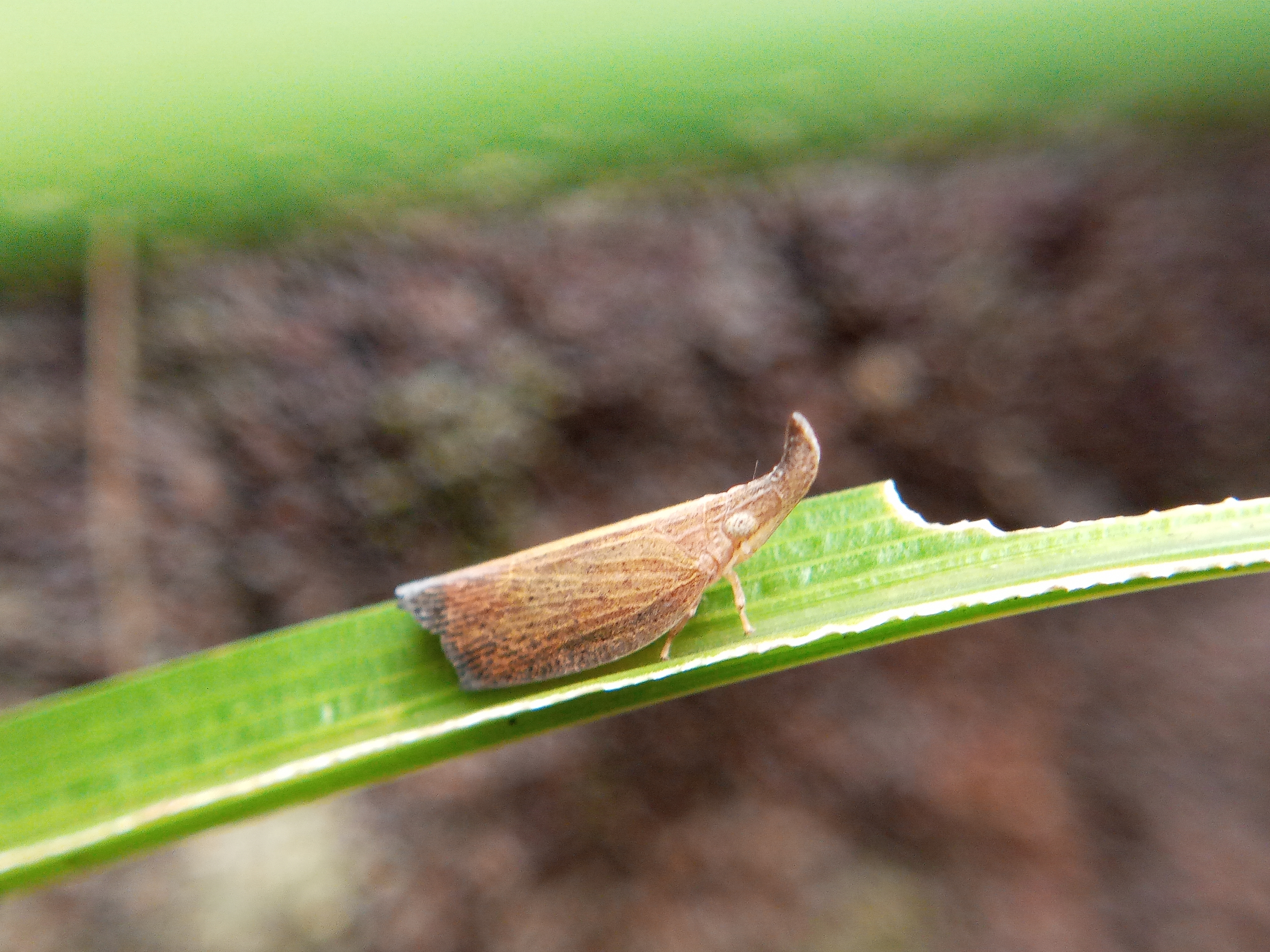
- Pyrilla sp.

Scientific classification
- Domain: Eukaryota
- Kingdom: Animalia
- Phylum: Arthropoda
- Class: Insecta
- Order: Hemiptera
- Suborder: Auchenorrhyncha
- Infraorder: Fulgoromorpha
- Family: Lophopidae
- Subfamily: Lophopinae
- Genus: Pyrilla; Stål, 1859

= Pyrilla =

Genus of true bugs

Pyrilla is a genus of bugs in the subfamily Lophopinae and tribe Lophopini.

Species are distributed in Asia: eastwards from Pakistan to Borneo. Pyrilla perpusilla, also known as the 'sugarcane planthopper', is a significant pest of sugarcane.

== Species ==
Fulgoromorpha Lists On the Web lists the following:

1. Pyrilla aberrans (Kirby, 1891)
2. Pyrilla lycoides (Walker, 1862)
3. Pyrilla perpusilla (Walker, 1851)
4. Pyrilla protuberans Stål, 1859 – type species
5. Pyrilla punjabensis Shakila, 1984
6. Pyrilla rahimyarensis Shakila, 1984
7. Pyrilla sinica Liang, 1997
8. Pyrilla sumatrensis Baker, 1925
