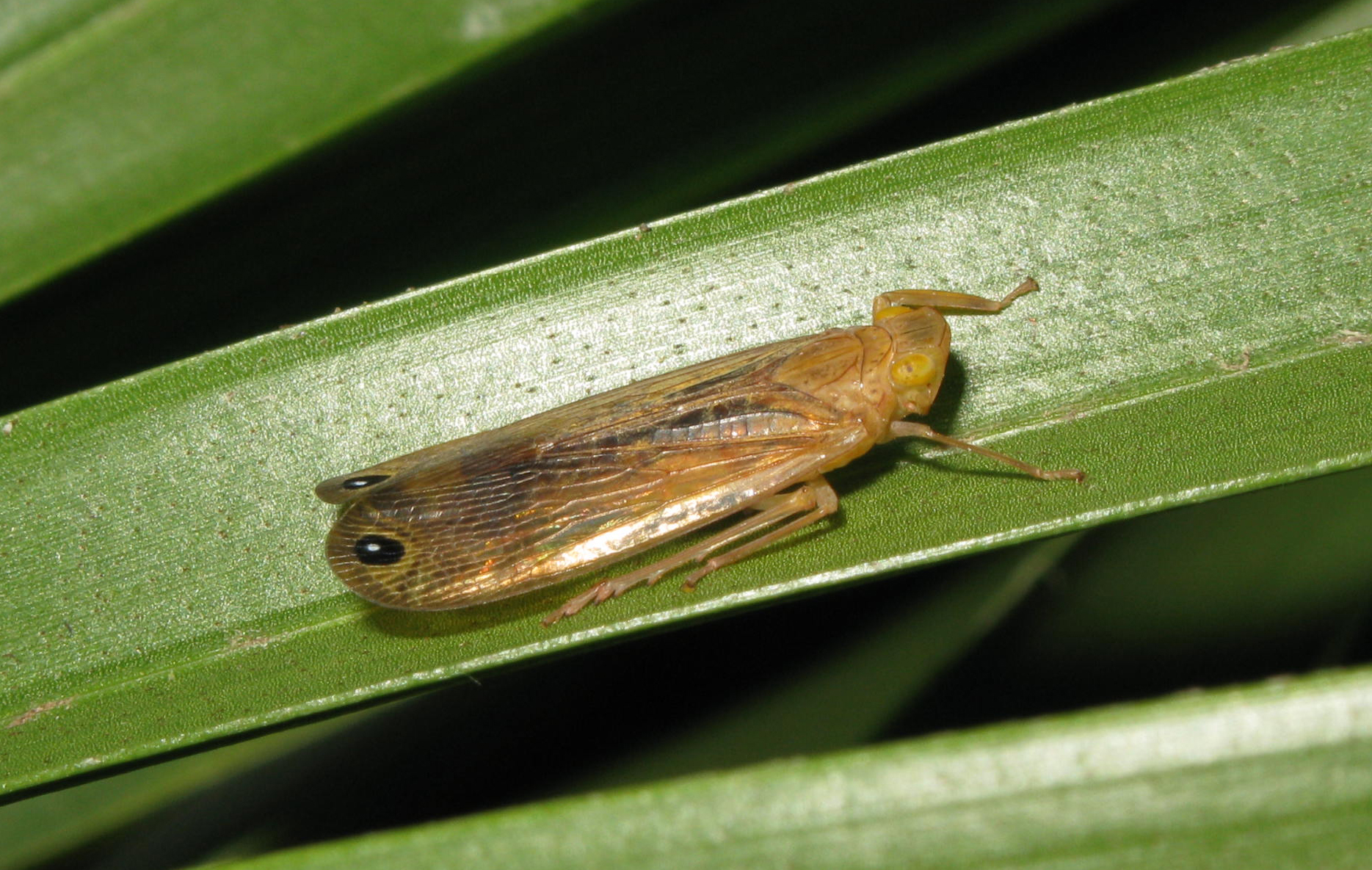
- Zophiuma butawengi on oil palm in Papua New Guinea

Scientific classification
- Kingdom: Animalia
- Phylum: Arthropoda
- Class: Insecta
- Order: Hemiptera
- Suborder: Auchenorrhyncha
- Infraorder: Fulgoromorpha
- Family: Lophopidae
- Subfamily: Menoscinae
- Tribe: Acarnini
- Genus: Zophiuma; Fennah, 1955

Synonyms
- Hellerides Lallemand, 1962

= Zophiuma =

Genus of true bugs

Zophiuma is a genus of planthoppers in the tribe Acarnini, erected by Ronald Gordon Fennah in 1955. Distribution records are limited to the New Guinea region.

== Species ==
Fulgoromorpha Lists on the Web includes:

1. Zophiuma butawengi (Heller, 1966)
2. Zophiuma gitauae Soulier-Perkins & Le Cesne, 2021
3. Zophiuma pupillata (Stål, 1863) - type species
4. Zophiuma torricelli Soulier-Perkins & Le Cesne, 2021
