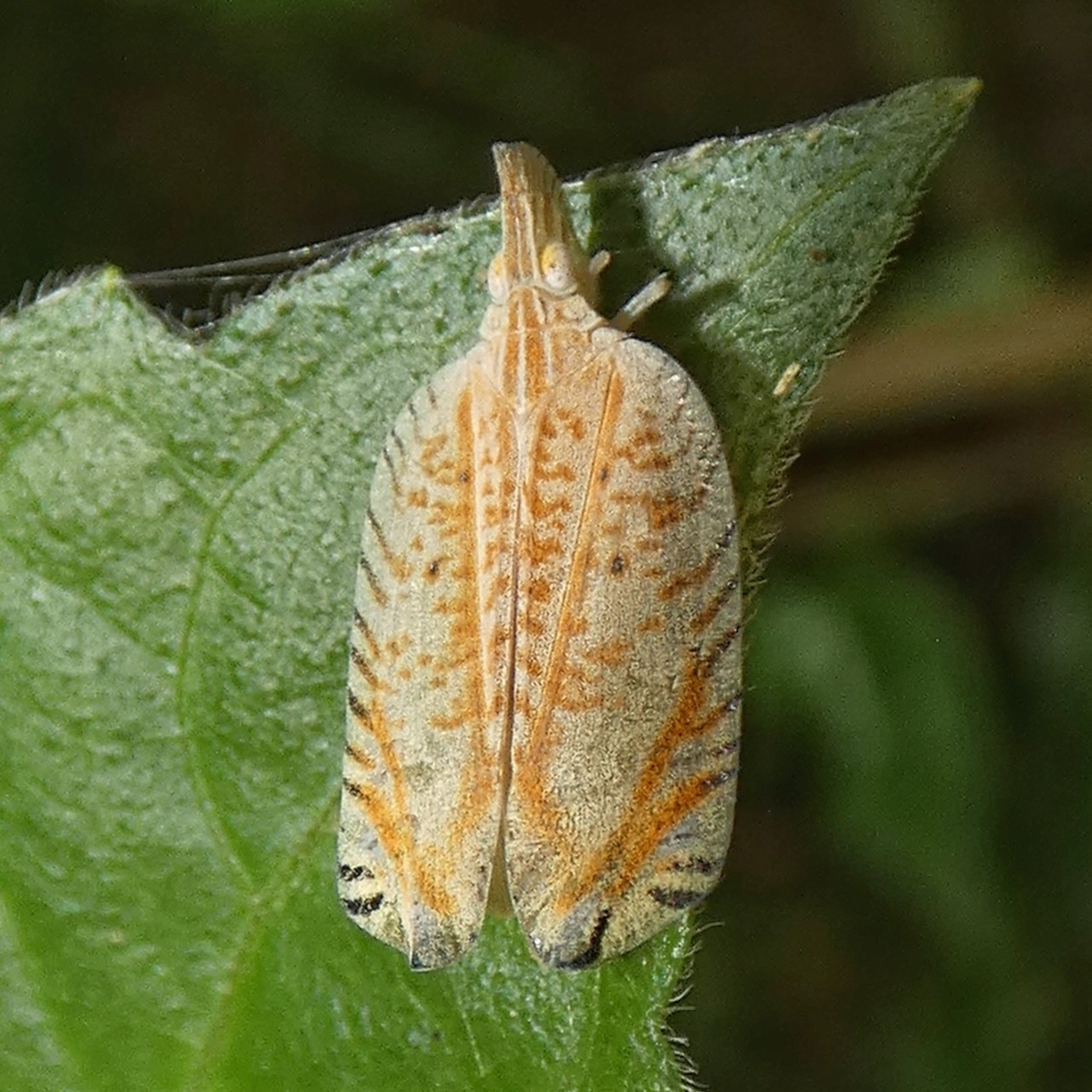
- Lophops zebra

Scientific classification
- Kingdom: Animalia
- Phylum: Arthropoda
- Clade: Pancrustacea
- Class: Insecta
- Order: Hemiptera
- Suborder: Auchenorrhyncha
- Infraorder: Fulgoromorpha
- Family: Lophopidae
- Subfamily: Lophopinae
- Tribe: Lophopini
- Genus: Lophops; Spinola, 1839

Synonyms
- Cystingocephala Stål, 1853; Gozarta Walker, 1870; Brixioides Kirby, 1891; Astorga Kirkaldy, 1906

= Lophops =

Genus of true bugs

Lophops is the type genus of planthoppers for the family Lophopidae, subfamily Lophopinae and tribe Lophopini; it was erected by Maximilian Spinola in 1839.

Records of occurrence (probably incomplete) for species include: Africa, China, Indochina, Malesia including the Philippines, New Guinea and Australia.

== Species ==
The following species are recognised in the genus Lophops:

- Lophops africana (Schmidt, 1912)
- Lophops angustipennis Stål, 1866
- Lophops bwamba Soulier-Perkins, 2017
- Lophops carinata (Kirby, 1891)
- Lophops fusca Melichar, 1915
- Lophops incognita Soulier-Perkins, 2017
- Lophops intermedia Schmidt, 1926
- Lophops kwazulu Soulier-Perkins, 2017
- Lophops malagarassi Soulier-Perkins, 2017
- Lophops mentawiensis Baker, 1927
- Lophops pallida Melichar, 1902
- Lophops saccharicida (Kirkaldy, 1906)
- Lophops servillei Spinola, 1839 - type species
- Lophops sigwalti Soulier-Perkins, 2017
- Lophops stilleri Soulier-Perkins, 2017
- Lophops tigris Fennah, 1955
- Lophops verschureni Synave, 1962
- Lophops watshami Soulier-Perkins, 2017
- Lophops zebra (Walker, 1870)
