= Menosca =

Scientific classification
- Kingdom: Animalia
- Phylum: Arthropoda
- Clade: Pancrustacea
- Class: Insecta
- Order: Hemiptera
- Suborder: Auchenorrhyncha
- Infraorder: Fulgoromorpha
- Family: Lophopidae
- Subfamily: Menoscinae
- Genus: Menosca; Stål, 1870

Synonyms
- Not Jivatma (Note: Note: the similar monotypic genus containing the species Jivatma metallica Distant, 1906 was considered a synonym of Menosca, before being restored by Emeljanov in 2013.)

Genus of true bugs

External image
- Images at iNaturalist

Menosca is a genus of Asian planthoppers in the family Lophopidae and is the type genus of the subfamily Menoscinae and tribe Menoscini Melichar, 1915; it was erected by Carl Stål in 1870.

Records of occurrence (possibly incomplete) for species are from Borneo and the Philippines, from where insect specimens were originally described.

== Species ==
Fulgoromorpha Lists On the Web includes the following:

1. Menosca discophora Stål, 1870
2. Menosca insignis (Distant, 1909)
3. Menosca moro Baker, 1925
4. Menosca punctigera Stål, 1870
5. Menosca triangulata (Banks, 1910)
6. Menosca vermiculata Baker, 1925
7. Menosca whiteheadi (Distant, 1909)
