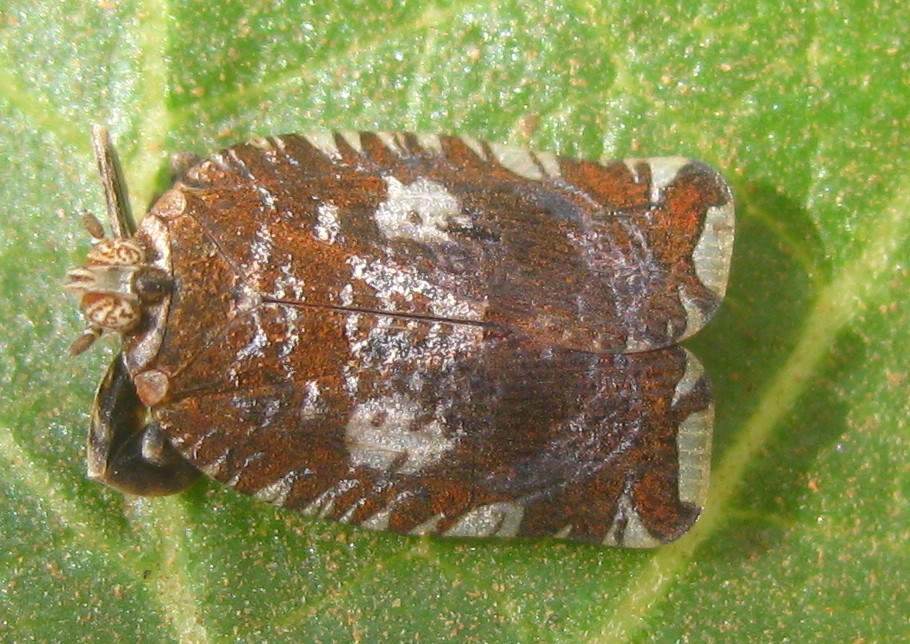
- Elasmoscelis sp.

Scientific classification
- Domain: Eukaryota
- Kingdom: Animalia
- Phylum: Arthropoda
- Class: Insecta
- Order: Hemiptera
- Suborder: Auchenorrhyncha
- Infraorder: Fulgoromorpha
- Family: Lophopidae
- Subfamily: Menoscinae
- Genus: Elasmoscelis; Spinola, 1839

= Elasmoscelis =

Genus of true bugs

Elasmoscelis is a genus of planthoppers in the family Lophopidae, subfamily Menoscinae and the monogeneric tribe Elasmoscelini Melichar, 1915; it was erected by Maximilian Spinola in 1839.

Records of occurrence (probably incomplete) for species include: Africa, Sri Lanka, China, Indochina and Malesia.

== Species ==
Fulgoromorpha Lists On the Web. includes:

1. Elasmoscelis capeneri Dlabola, 1959
2. Elasmoscelis cimicoides Spinola, 1839
  - type species
3. Elasmoscelis damon Linnavuori, 1973
4. Elasmoscelis decora (Walker, 1851)
5. Elasmoscelis despecta Melichar, 1915
6. Elasmoscelis garambaensis Synave, 1962
7. Elasmoscelis guineensis Synave, 1963
8. Elasmoscelis impala Linnavuori, 1973
9. Elasmoscelis kankundensis Synave, 1958
10. Elasmoscelis lundana Synave, 1961
11. Elasmoscelis mpazensis Synave, 1962
12. Elasmoscelis paliensis Synave, 1962
13. Elasmoscelis perforata Walker, 1862
  (2 subspecies.)
14. Elasmoscelis punctata Synave, 1958
15. Elasmoscelis rhodesiana Distant, 1910
16. Elasmoscelis saegeri Synave, 1962
17. Elasmoscelis similis Synave, 1962
18. Elasmoscelis spinifer Linnavuori, 1973
19. Elasmoscelis stali Distant, 1907
20. Elasmoscelis trimaculata Walker, 1851
21. Elasmoscelis utukurensis Synave, 1962
