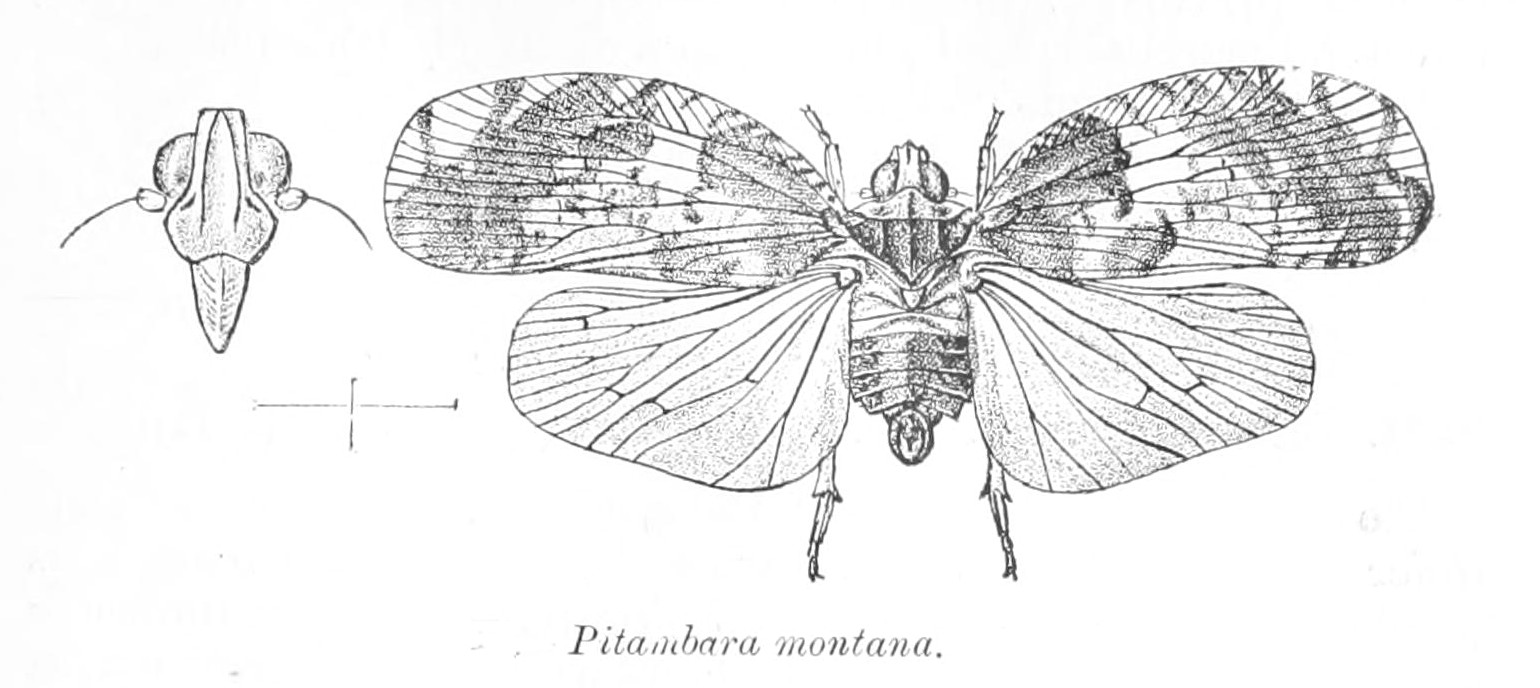
- Pitambara montana

Scientific classification
- Kingdom: Animalia
- Phylum: Arthropoda
- Clade: Pancrustacea
- Class: Insecta
- Order: Hemiptera
- Suborder: Auchenorrhyncha
- Infraorder: Fulgoromorpha
- Family: Lophopidae
- Subfamily: Lophopinae
- Tribe: Lophopini
- Genus: Pitambara; Distant, 1906

= Pitambara =

Genus of true bugs

Pitambara is a genus of Asian planthoppers in the family Lophopidae and tribe Lophopini, erected by William Lucas Distant in 1906.

Records of occurrence (probably incomplete) for species include Sri Lanka and Indochina.

== Species ==
Fulgoromorpha Lists On the Web includes:

1. Pitambara acuminata Lv, Yang, Zhang & Chen, 2025
2. Pitambara assamensis Liang, 2000
3. Pitambara borneensis Baker, 1925
4. Pitambara dawnana Distant, 1912
5. Pitambara impudica Wang & Bourgoin, 2016
6. Pitambara interrupta Distant, 1906
7. Pitambara montana Distant, 1912
8. Pitambara nigrofuscata Liang, 2000
9. Pitambara radians (Kirby, 1891) - type species
10. Pitambara rubrofasciata Liang, 2000
11. Pitambara ruiliensis Lv, Yang, Zhang & Chen, 2025
12. Pitambara sinuata Distant, 1906
13. Pitambara tagalica (Stål, 1854)
14. Pitambara tonkinensis Lallemand, 1942
15. Pitambara tricorne Wang & Wang, 2016
16. Pitambara triremiprocta Wang & Soulier-Perkins, 2016
17. Pitambara trypetoides Emeljanov, 2018
18. Pitambara undulata Distant, 1906
