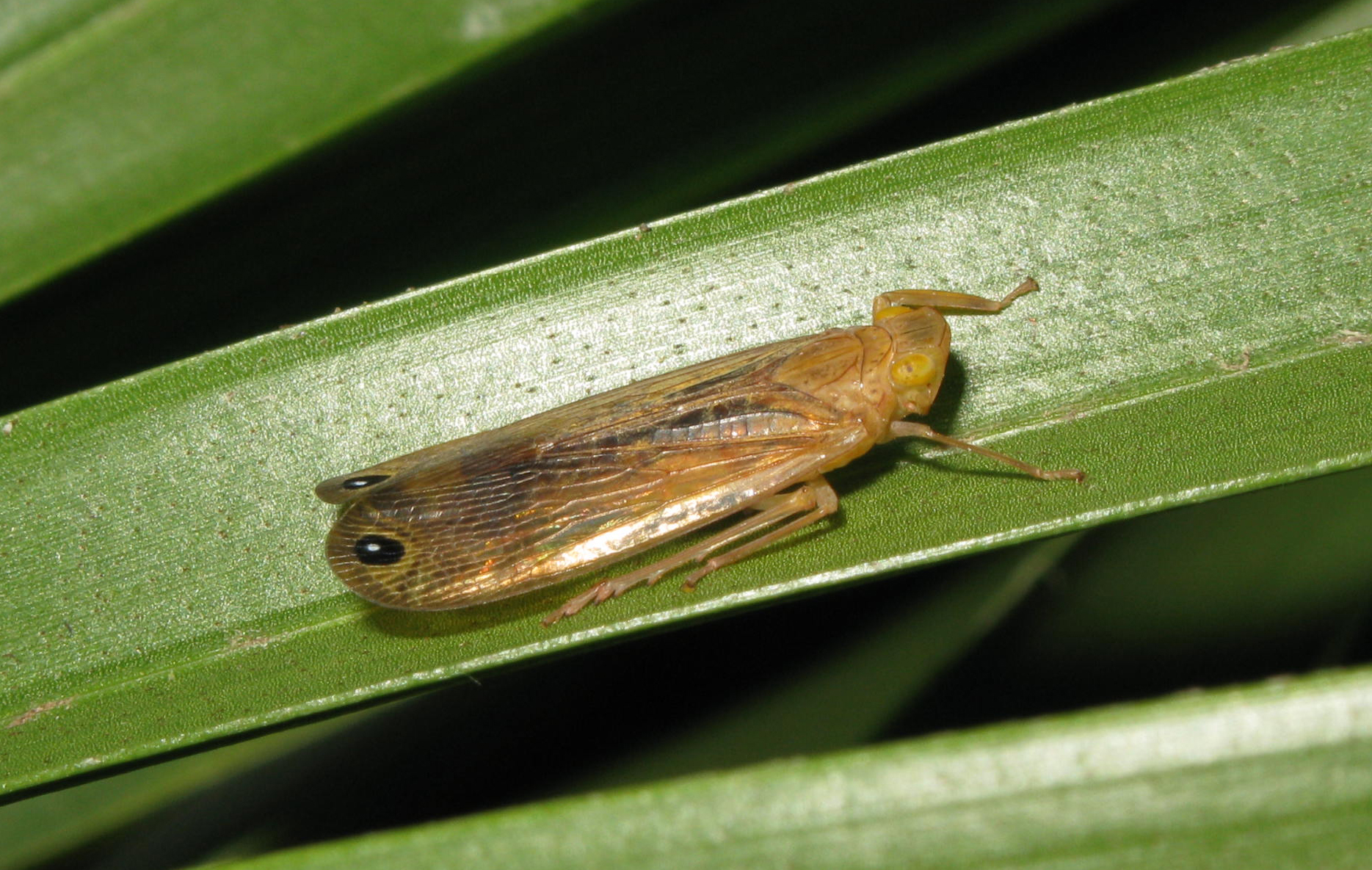
- Zophiuma butawengi

Scientific classification
- Domain: Eukaryota
- Kingdom: Animalia
- Phylum: Arthropoda
- Class: Insecta
- Order: Hemiptera
- Suborder: Auchenorrhyncha
- Infraorder: Fulgoromorpha
- Superfamily: Fulgoroidea
- Family: Lophopidae
- Subfamily: Menoscinae; Melichar, 1915

= Menoscinae =

Subfamily of planthoppers

The Menoscinae are a subfamily of planthoppers in the family Lophopidae erected by Leopold Melichar in 1915. Most genera are recorded from SE Asia through to Australia, but the single genus in tribe Carrioniini is Neotropical.

== Tribes and Genera ==
Fulgoromorpha Lists on the Web includes:

=== Acarnini ===
Auth.: Baker, 1925 (New Guinea, Australia)

1. Acarna Stål, 1863
2. Jugoda Melichar, 1915
3. Kasserota Distant, 1906
4. Maana Soulier-Perkins, 1998
5. Magia Distant, 1907
6. Megacarna Baker, 1925
7. Meloenopia Metcalf, 1952
8. Onycta Fennah, 1955
9. Zophiuma Fennah, 1955

=== Carrioniini ===
Auth.: Emeljanov, 2013 (Central & South America: monogeneric)

1. Carrionia Muir, 1931

Elasmoscelini

Auth.: Melichar, 1915 (Africa, Asia: Japan, Indo-China, Java: monogeneric)

1. Elasmoscelis Spinola, 1839

=== Menoscini ===
Auth.: Melichar, 1915 (Indochina, Malesia)

1. Aluma Distant, 1909
2. Apia Distant, 1909
3. Bisma Distant, 1906
4. Epiptyxis Gerstaecker, 1895
5. Lapithasa Melichar, 1914
6. Menosca Stål, 1870
7. Pseudocorethrura Melichar, 1915
8. Pseudotyxis Soulier-Perkins, 1998
9. Zeleja Melichar, 1915

=== Virgiliini ===
Auth.: Emeljanov, 2013 (New Guinea, Philippines)

1. Buxtoniella Muir, 1927
2. Clonaspe Fennah, 1955
3. Makota Distant, 1909
4. Painella Muir, 1931
5. Venisiella Stroinski & Soulier-Perkins, 2015
6. Virgilia Stål, 1870
