= Virgil =

1st-century-BC Roman poet

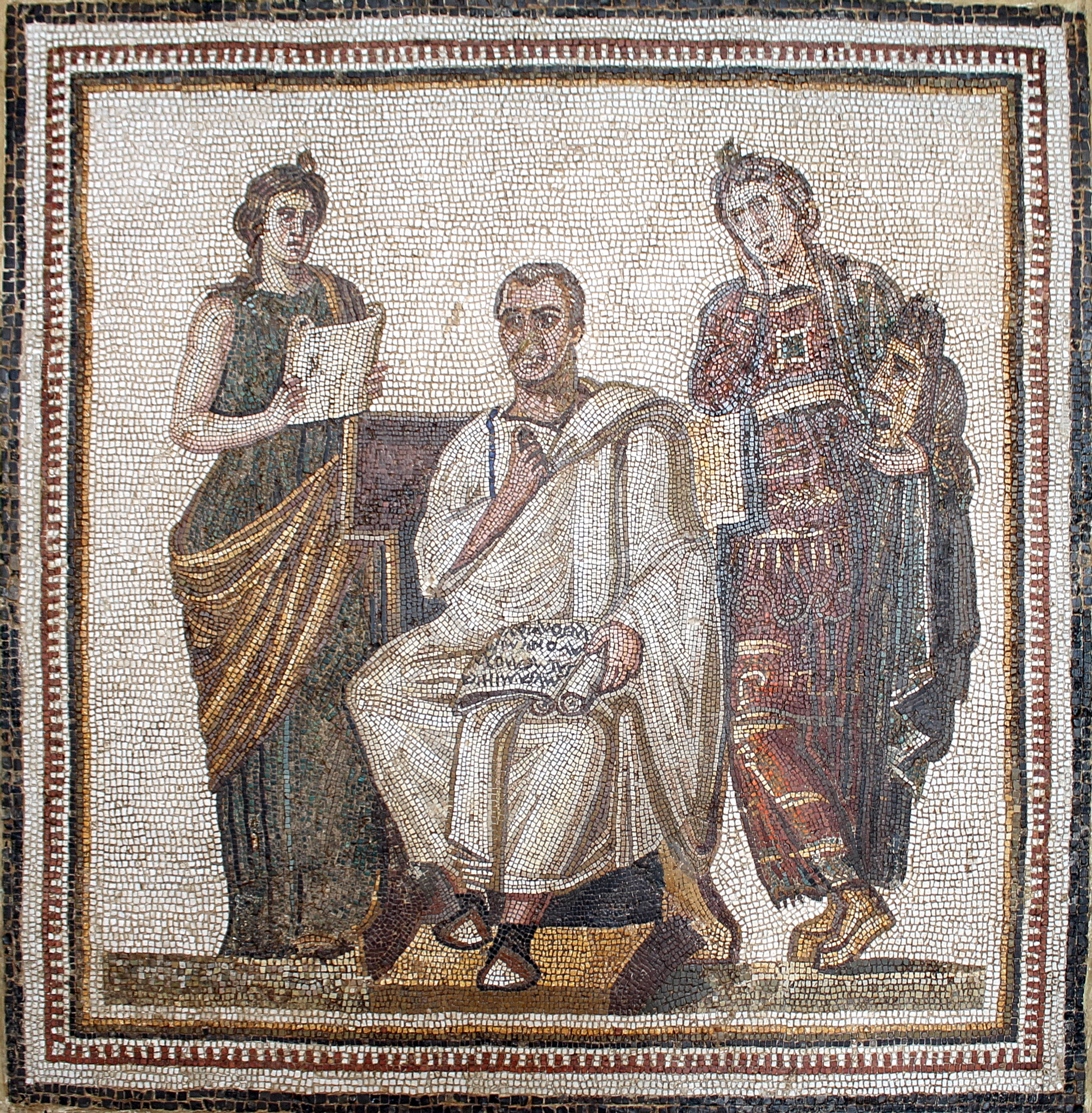
- A 3rd-century Roman mosaic of Virgil seated between Clio and Melpomene (from Hadrumetum [Sousse], Tunisia)
- Born: Publius Vergilius Maro; 15 October 70 BC; Andes, Cisalpine Gaul, Roman Republic
- Died: 21 September 19 BC (aged 50); Brundisium, Italy, Roman Empire
- Occupation: Poet
- Writing career
- Genres: Epic poetry; didactic poetry; pastoral poetry
- Notable works: Eclogues; Georgics; Aeneid
- Movement: Augustan literature (ancient Rome)

Publius Vergilius Maro (Classical Latin: [ˈpuːbliʊs wɛrˈɡɪliʊs ˈmaroː]; 15 October 70 BC – 21 September 19 BC), usually called Virgil or Vergil (/ˈvɜːrdʒɪl/ VUR-jil) in English, was an ancient Roman poet of the Augustan period. He composed three of the most famous poems in Latin literature: the Eclogues (or Bucolics), the Georgics, and the epic Aeneid. Some minor poems, collected in the Appendix Vergiliana, were attributed to him in ancient times, but modern scholars regard these as spurious, with the possible exception of some short pieces.

Already acclaimed in his lifetime as a classic author, Virgil rapidly replaced Ennius and other earlier authors as a standard school text, and stood as the most popular Latin poet through late antiquity, the Middle Ages, and early modernity, exerting major influence on Western literature. Geoffrey Chaucer assigned Virgil a uniquely prominent position in history in The House of Fame (1374–85), describing him as standing on a pilere / that was of tinned yren clere ("on a pillar that was of bright tin-plated iron"), and in the Divine Comedy, in which Virgil appears as the author's guide through Hell and Purgatory, Dante pays tribute to Virgil with the words tu se' solo colui da cu'io tolsi / lo bello stile che m'ha fatto onore (Inf. I.86–7) ("thou art alone the one from whom I took the beautiful style that has done honour to me"). In the 20th century, T. S. Eliot famously began a lecture on the subject "What Is a Classic?" by asserting as self-evidently true that "whatever the definition we arrive at, it cannot be one which excludes Virgil – we may say confidently that it must be one which will expressly reckon with him".

== Traditional biography ==
=== Biographical sources ===
Biographical information about Virgil is transmitted chiefly in vitae ("lives") of the poet, prefixed to commentaries on his work by Probus, Donatus, and Servius. The life given by Donatus is considered to closely reproduce the life of Virgil from a lost work of Suetonius on the lives of famous authors, just as Donatus used it for the poet's life in his commentary on Terence, where Suetonius is explicitly credited. The far shorter life given by Servius likewise seems to be an abridgement of Suetonius except for one or two statements. Varius is said to have written a memoir of his friend Virgil, and Suetonius likely drew on this lost work and other sources contemporary with the poet. A life written in verse by the grammarian Phocas (probably active in the 4th to 5th centuries AD) differs in some details from Donatus and Servius. Henry Nettleship believed the life attributed to Probus may have drawn independently from the same sources as Suetonius, but it is attributed by other authorities to an anonymous author of the 5th or 6th century AD who drew on Donatus, Servius, and Phocas. The Servian life was the principal source of Virgil's biography for medieval readers, while the Donatian life enjoyed a more limited circulation, and the lives of Phocas and Probus remained largely unknown.

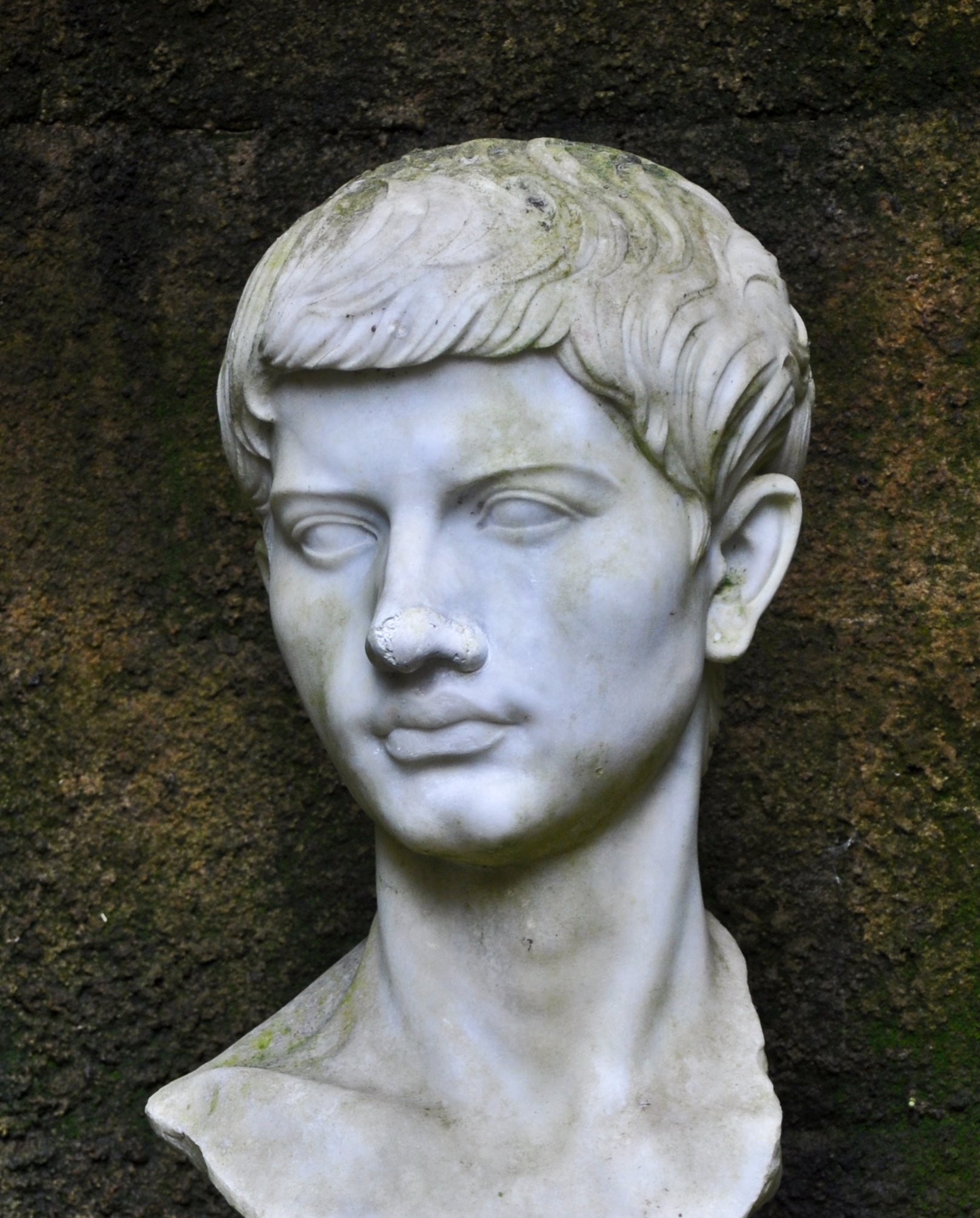
Modern bust of Virgil at the entrance to his crypt in Naples

Although the commentaries record much factual information about Virgil, some of their evidence can be shown to rely on allegorizing and on inferences drawn from his poetry. For this reason, details regarding Virgil's life story are considered somewhat problematic.

=== Family and birth ===
According to the ancient vitae, Publius Vergilius Maro was born on the Ides of October during the consulship of Pompey and Crassus (15 October 70 BC) in the village of Andes, near Mantua in Cisalpine Gaul (northern Italy, added to Italy proper during his lifetime). His ancestry is uncertain, with scholars variously proposing Etruscan, Celtic, Venetic, Ligurian or Greek origins.

The Donatian life reports that some say Virgil's father was a potter, but most say he was an employee of an apparitor named Magius, whose daughter he married. According to Phocas and Probus, the name of Virgil's mother was Magia Polla. The gentilicium of Virgil's maternal family, Magius, and failure to distinguish the genitive form of this name (Magi) in Servius' life, from the genitive magi of the noun magus ("magician"), probably contributed to the rise of the medieval legend that Virgil's father was employed by a certain itinerant magician, and that Virgil was a magician.

==== Site of Andes ====
A tradition of obscure origin, which was accepted by Dante, identifies Andes with modern Pietole, two or three miles southeast of Mantua. The ancient biography attributed to Probus records that Andes was thirty Roman miles (about 45 kilometres or 28 miles) from Mantua. There are eight or nine references to the gens to which Vergil belonged, gens Vergilia, in inscriptions from Northern Italy. Out of these, four are from townships remote from Mantua, three appear in inscriptions from Verona, and one in an inscription from Calvisano, a votive offering to the Matronae (a group of deities) by a woman called Vergilia, asking the goddesses to deliver from danger another woman, called Munatia. A tomb erected by a member of the gens Magia, to which Virgil's mother belonged, is found at Casalpoglio, just 12 kilometres (7.5 mi) from Calvisano. In 1915, G. E. K. Braunholtz drew attention to the proximity of these inscriptions to each other, and the fact that Calvisano is exactly 30 Roman miles from Mantua, which led Robert Seymour Conway to theorize that these inscriptions have to do with relatives of Virgil, and Calvisano or Carpenedolo, not Pietole, is the site of Andes. E. K. Rand defended the traditional site at Pietole, noting that Egnazio's 1507 edition of Probus's commentary, supposedly based on a "very ancient codex" from Bobbio Abbey which can no longer be found, says that Andes was three miles from Mantua, and arguing this is the correct reading. Conway replied that Egnazio's manuscript cannot be trusted to have been as ancient as Egnazio claimed it was, nor can we be sure that the reading "three" is not Egnazio's conjectural correction of his manuscript to harmonize it with the Pietole tradition, and all other evidence strongly favours the unanimous reading of the other witnesses of "thirty miles". Other studies claim that today's consideration for ancient Andes should be sought in the Casalpoglio area of Castel Goffredo.

==== Spelling of name ====
By the 4th or 5th century AD the original spelling Vergilius had been changed to Virgilius, and the latter spelling spread to modern European languages. This latter spelling persisted even though, as early as the 15th century, the classical scholar Poliziano had shown Vergilius to be the original spelling. Today, the anglicisations Vergil and Virgil are both considered acceptable.

There is speculation that the spelling Virgilius might have arisen due to a pun, since virg- carries an echo of the Latin word for "wand" (uirga), Virgil being particularly associated with magic in the Middle Ages. There is also a possibility that virg- is meant to evoke the Latin virgo ("virgin"); this would be a reference to the fourth Eclogue, which has a history of Christian, and specifically Messianic, interpretations. (Note: For more discussion on the spelling of Virgil's name, see Flickinger, R. C. 1930. "Vergil or Virgil?". The Classical Journal 25(9):658–60.)

=== Childhood and education ===
Virgil spent his boyhood in Cremona until his 15th year (55 BC), when he is said to have received the toga virilis on the very day Lucretius died. From Cremona, he moved to Milan, and shortly afterwards to Rome. After briefly considering a career in rhetoric and law, Virgil turned his talents to poetry. Despite the biographers' statements that Virgil's family was of modest means, these accounts of his education, as well as of his ceremonial assumption of the toga virilis, suggest his father was a wealthy equestrian landowner.

He is said to have been tall and stout, with a swarthy complexion and a rustic appearance. Virgil seems to have suffered bad health throughout his life and in some ways lived the life of an invalid. Schoolmates considered Virgil shy and reserved, and he was nicknamed "Parthenias" ("virgin") because of his aloofness.

=== Poetic career ===
The biographical tradition asserts that Virgil began the hexameter Eclogues (or Bucolics) in 42 BC and it is thought the collection was published around 39–38 BC, although this is controversial. After defeating the army led by the assassins of Julius Caesar in the Battle of Philippi (42 BC), Octavian tried to pay off his veterans with land expropriated from towns in northern Italy, which—according to tradition—included an estate near Mantua belonging to Virgil. The loss of Virgil's family farm and the attempt through poetic petitions to regain his property, were seen as his motives in the composition of the Eclogues. This is now thought to be an unsupported inference from interpretations of the Eclogues. In Eclogues 1 and 9, Virgil indeed dramatizes the contrasting feelings caused by the brutality of the land expropriations through pastoral idiom, but offers no indisputable evidence of the supposed biographic incident.

Sometime after the publication of the Eclogues, probably before 37 BC, Virgil became part of the circle of Gaius Maecenas, Octavian's capable political adviser, who sought to counter sympathy for Antony among the leading families by rallying Roman literary figures to Octavian's side. Virgil came to know many other leading literary figures of the time, including Horace, in whose poetry he is often mentioned, and Varius Rufus, who later helped finish the Aeneid. At Maecenas's insistence, according to the tradition, Virgil spent the ensuing years (perhaps 37–29 BC) on the long dactylic hexameter poem called the Georgics (from Greek, "On Working the Earth"), which he dedicated to Maecenas.

Virgil worked on the Aeneid during the last eleven years of his life (29–19 BC), commissioned, according to Propertius, by Augustus. According to the tradition, Virgil travelled to the senatorial province of Achaea in Greece, in about 19 BC, to revise the Aeneid. After meeting Augustus in Athens and deciding to return home, Virgil caught a fever while visiting a town near Megara. After crossing to Italy by ship, weakened with disease, Virgil died in Apulia on 21 September 19 BC. Augustus ordered Virgil's literary executors, Lucius Varius Rufus and Plotius Tucca, to disregard Virgil's wish that the poem be burned, instead ordering it to be published with as few editorial changes as possible.

==== Burial and tomb ====
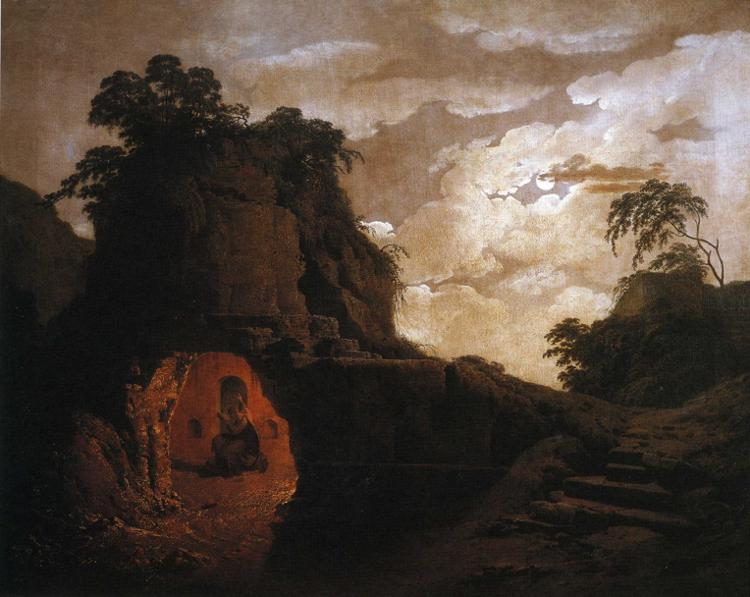
Painting of Virgil's Tomb, with the Figure of Silius Italicus by Joseph Wright of Derby

After his death at Brundisium according to Donatus, or Taranto according to late manuscripts of Servius, Virgil's remains were transported to Naples, where his tomb was engraved with an epitaph he had composed: Mantua me genuit; Calabri rapuere; tenet nunc Parthenope. Cecini pascua, rura, duces; "Mantua gave me life, the Calabrians took it away, Naples holds me now; I sang of pastures, farms, and commanders." (transl. Bernard Knox) Martial reports that Silius Italicus annexed the site to his estate (11.48, 11.50), and Pliny the Younger says that Silius "would visit Virgil's tomb as if it were a temple" (Epistulae 3.7.8).

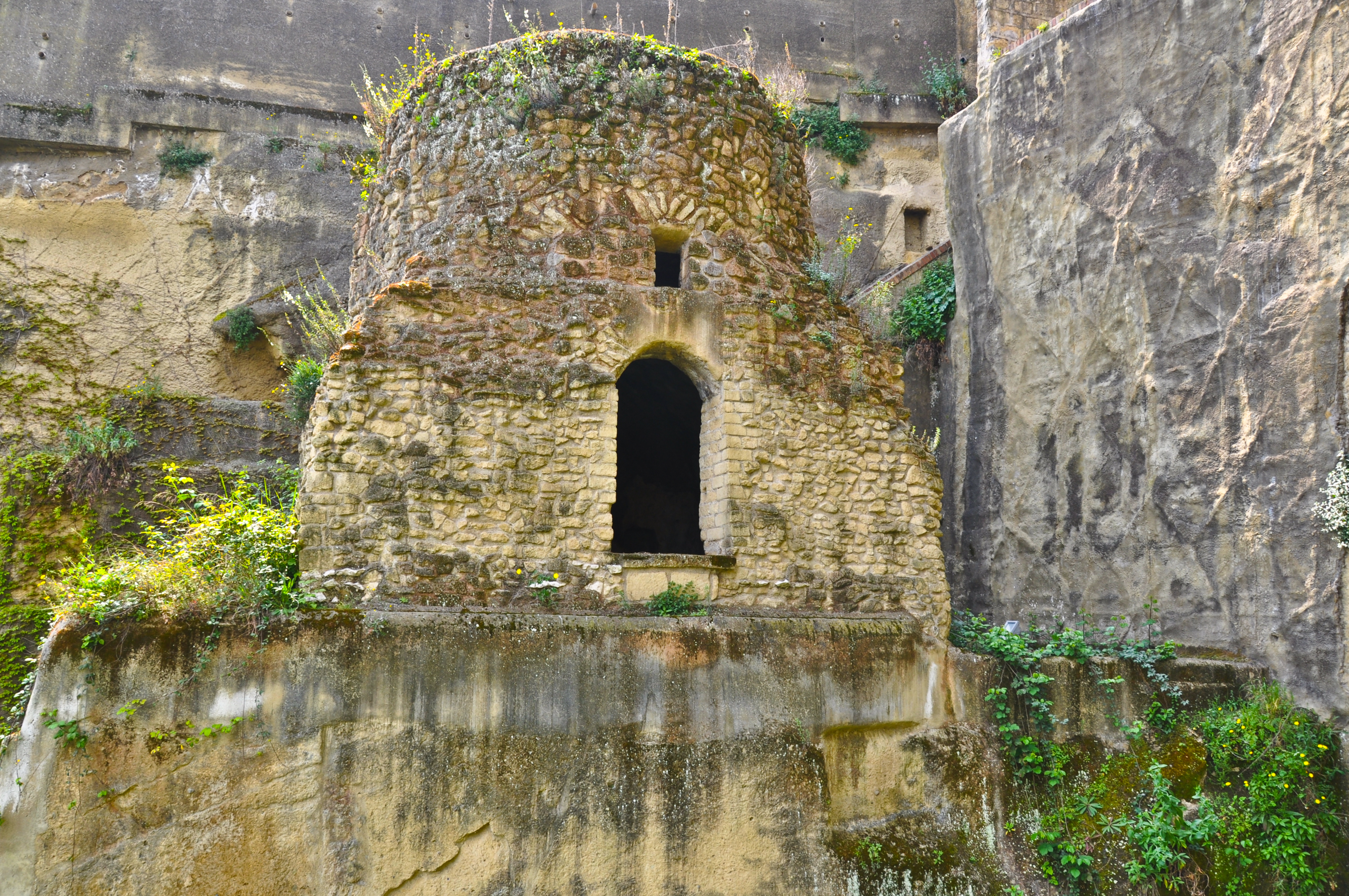
Virgil's tomb in Naples, Italy

The structure known as Virgil's tomb is found at the entrance of an ancient Roman tunnel (grotta vecchia) in Piedigrotta, a district 1.9 mi (3 km) from the centre of Naples, near the Mergellina harbour, on the road heading north along the coast to Pozzuoli. While Virgil was already the object of literary admiration and veneration before his death, in the Middle Ages his name became associated with miraculous powers, and for a couple of centuries his tomb was the destination of pilgrimages and veneration. A famous medieval legend that Paul the Apostle had visited Virgil's tomb and wept that so great a poet had died without the Christian faith is referenced in a liturgical hymn said to have been used on Paul's feast day at Mantua:

Ad Maronis mausoleum
Ductus, fudit super eum
Piæ rorem lacrymæ;
Quem te, inquit, reddidissem,
Si te vivum invenissem,
Poetarum maxime!

Translation:

When to Maro's tomb they brought him,
Tender grief and pity wrought him
To bedew the stone with tears;
"What a saint I might have crowned thee
Had I only living found thee,
Poet first and without peers!"

However, Johann Friedrich Heinrich Schlosser was unable to find a manuscript of this hymn, and reported that he had only heard these verses recited from memory by a brother who had lived at Mantua.

Through the 19th century, the supposed tomb attracted travellers on the Grand Tour, and still draws visitors.

== Works ==
=== Early works ===
According to the commentators, Virgil received his first education when he was five and later went to Cremona, Milan, and finally Rome to study rhetoric, medicine, and astronomy, which he would abandon for philosophy. From Virgil's admiring references to the neoteric writers Asinius Pollio and Cinna, it has been inferred that he was, for a time, associated with Catullus's neoteric circle. According to the Catalepton, he began to write poetry while in the Epicurean school of Siro in Naples. A group of small works attributed to the youthful Virgil by the commentators survive collected under the title Appendix Vergiliana, but are considered spurious by scholars. One, the Catalepton, consists of fourteen short poems, some of which may be Virgil's, and a short narrative poem Culex ("The Gnat"), was attributed to Virgil as early as the 1st century AD.

=== Eclogues ===
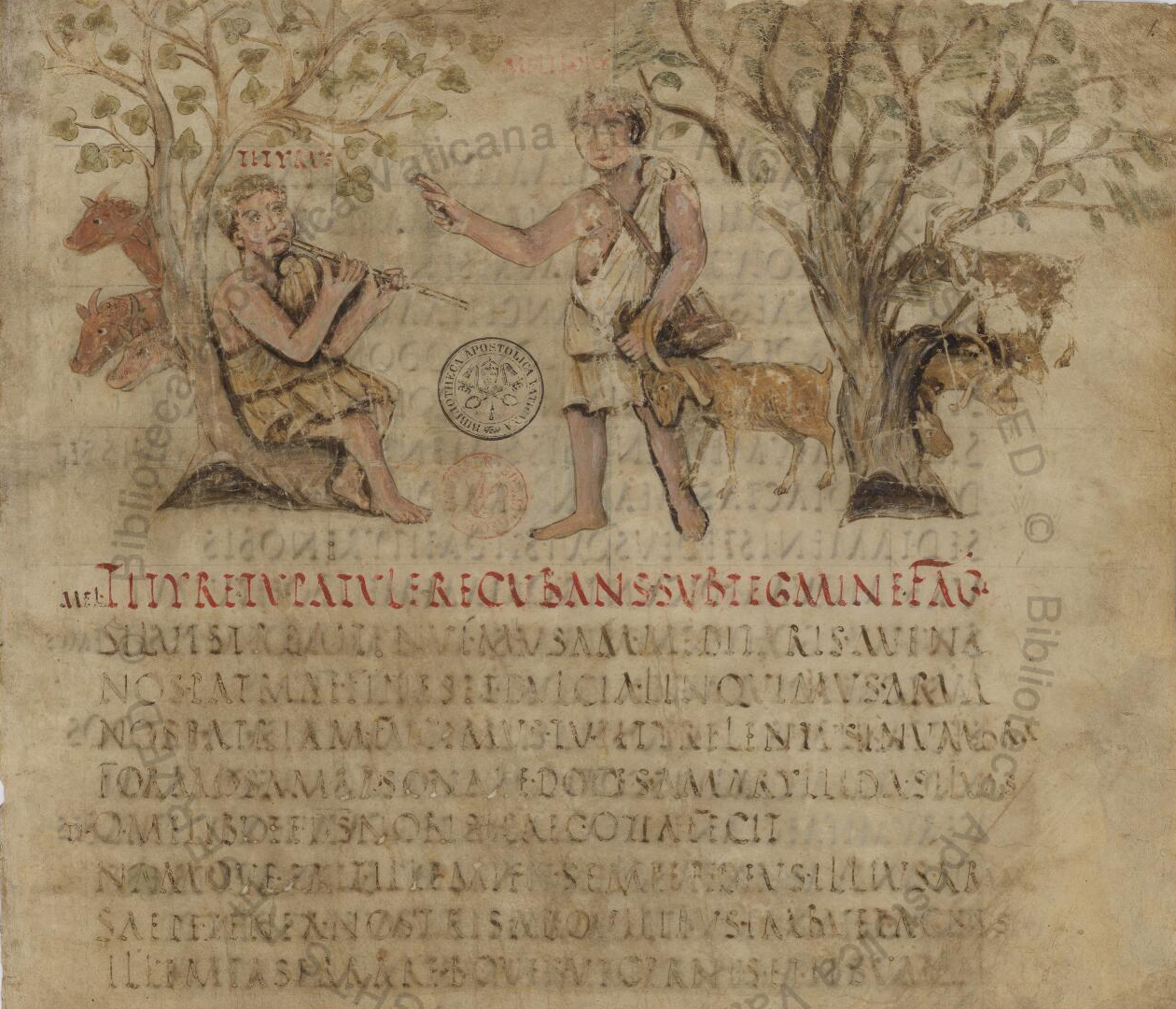
Page from the beginning of the Eclogues in the 5th-century Vergilius Romanus

The Eclogues (from the Greek for "selections") are a group of ten poems roughly modelled on the bucolic ("pastoral" or "rural") poetry of the Hellenistic poet Theocritus, which were written in dactylic hexameter. While some readers have identified Virgil with various characters and their vicissitudes, whether gratitude by an old rustic to a new god (Ecl. 1), frustrated love by a rustic singer for a distant boy (his master's pet, Ecl. 2), or a master singer's claim to have composed several eclogues (Ecl. 5), modern scholars largely reject such efforts to garner biographical details from fiction, preferring to interpret an author's characters and themes as illustrations of contemporary life and thought.

The ten Eclogues present traditional pastoral themes with a fresh perspective. Eclogues 1 and 9 address the land confiscations and their effects on the Italian countryside. 2 and 3 are pastoral and erotic, discussing homosexual love (Ecl. 2) and attraction toward people of any gender (Ecl. 3). Eclogue 4, addressed to Asinius Pollio, the so-called "Messianic Eclogue", uses the imagery of the golden age in connection with the birth of a child (the child's identity has been debated). 5 and 8 describe the myth of Daphnis in a song contest, 6, the cosmic and mythological song of Silenus; 7, a heated poetic contest, and 10 the sufferings of the contemporary elegiac poet Cornelius Gallus. Virgil in his Eclogues is credited with establishing Arcadia as a poetic ideal that still resonates in literature and visual arts and with setting the stage for the development of Latin pastoral by Calpurnius Siculus, Nemesianus and later writers.

=== Georgics ===
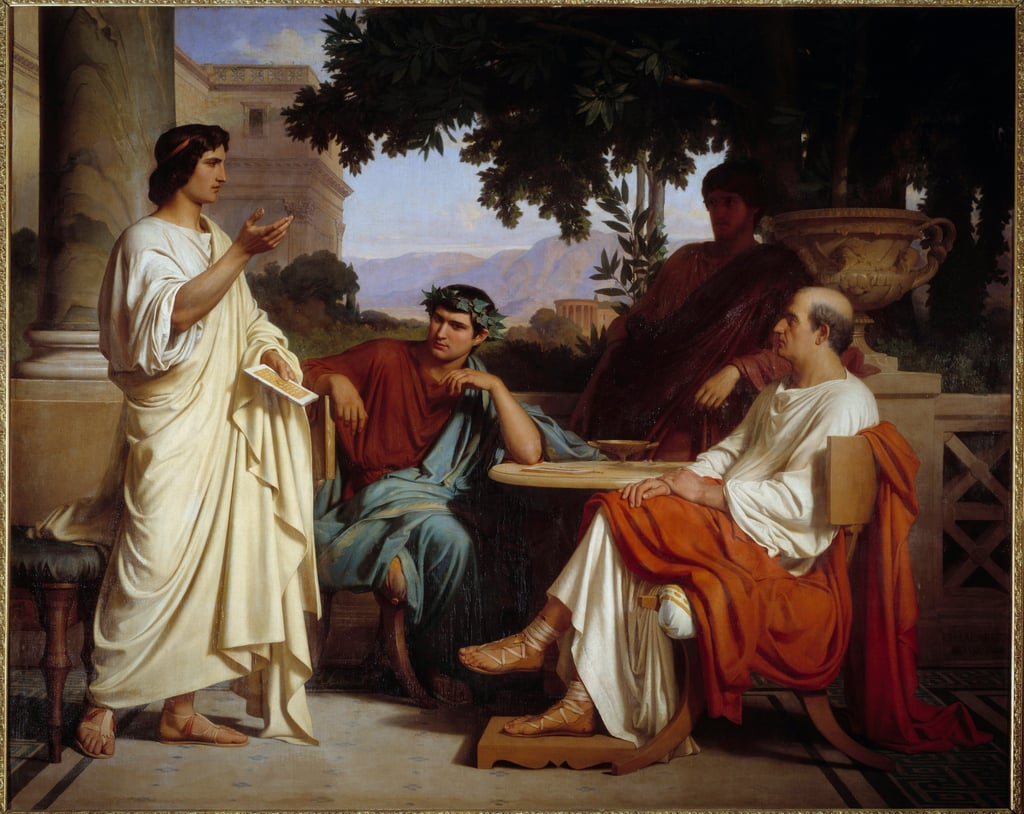
Horace, Virgil and Varius at the house of Maecenas, by Charles Jalabert

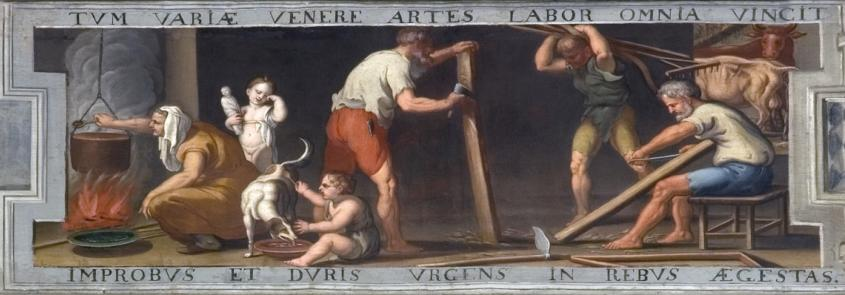
1680s illustration of a passage from the Georgics, by Jerzy Siemiginowski-Eleuter

The ostensible theme of the Georgics is instruction in the methods of running a farm. In handling this, Virgil follows in the didactic ("how to") tradition of the Greek poet Hesiod's Works and Days and works of the later Hellenistic poets. The four books of the Georgics focus respectively on:

1. raising crops;
2. raising trees;
3. livestock and horses;
4. beekeeping and the qualities of bees.

Well-known passages include the beloved Laus Italiae of Book 2, the prologue description of the temple in Book 3, and the description of the plague at the end of Book 3. Book 4 concludes with a long mythological narrative, in the form of an epyllion, which describes vividly the discovery of beekeeping by Aristaeus, and the story of Orpheus' journey to the underworld. Ancient scholars, such as Servius, conjectured that the Aristaeus episode replaced, at the emperor's request, a long section in praise of Virgil's friend, the poet Gallus, who was disgraced by Augustus, and committed suicide in 26 BC.

The tone of the Georgics wavers between optimism and pessimism, sparking critical debate on the poet's intentions, but the work lays the foundations for later didactic poetry. Virgil and Maecenas are said to have taken turns reading the Georgics to Octavian upon his return from defeating Antony and Cleopatra at the Battle of Actium in 31 BC.

=== Aeneid ===
The Aeneid is widely considered Virgil's finest work, and one of the most important poems in the history of literature (T. S. Eliot referred to it as "the classic of all Europe"). The work, modelled after Homer's Iliad and Odyssey, chronicles the journey of a warrior and refugee of the Trojan War, named Aeneas, as he struggles to fulfill his destiny. After fleeing the sack of Troy, he travels to Italy, where he battles with Turnus, and his descendants Romulus and Remus found the city of Rome.

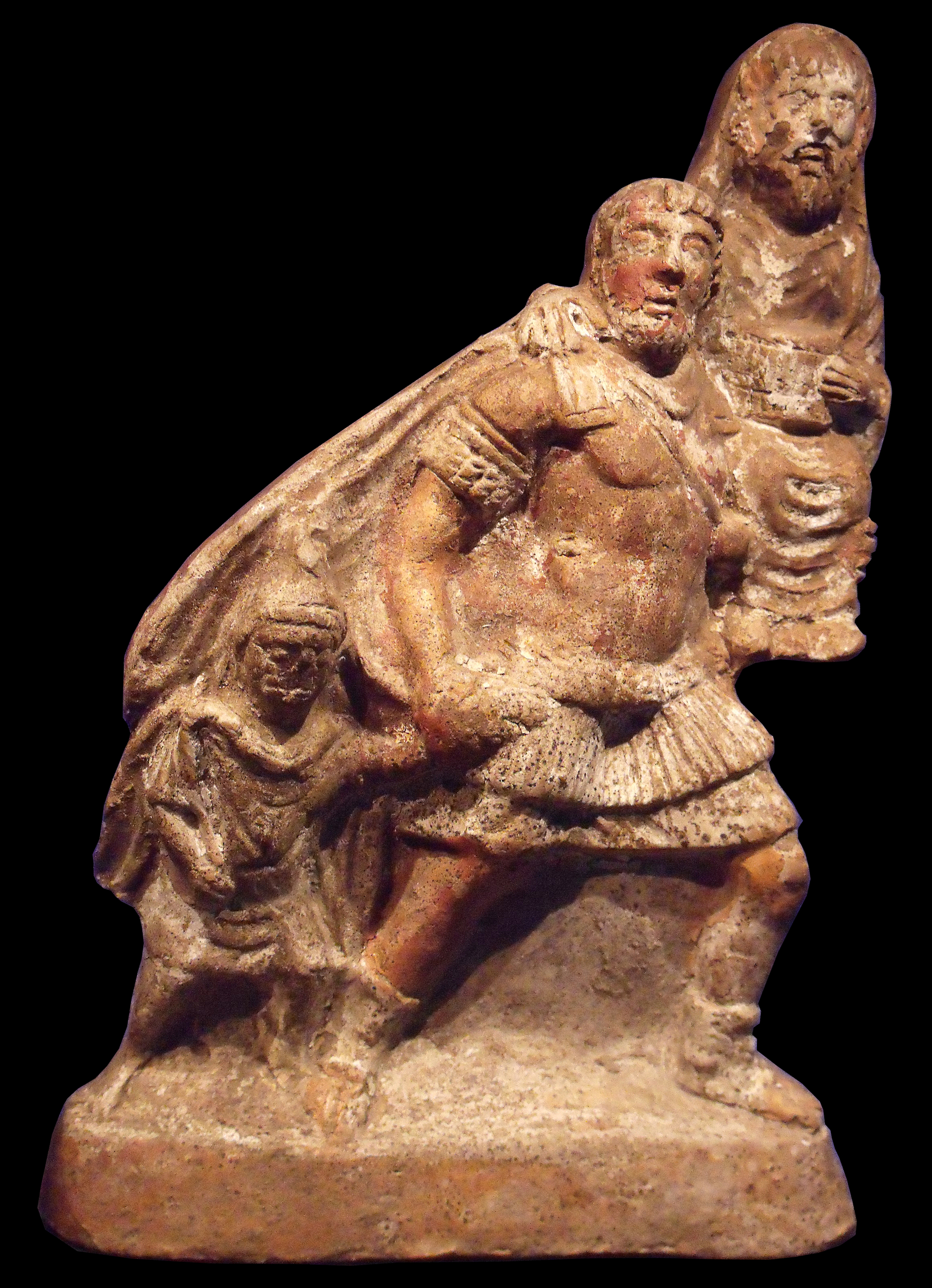
A 1st-century terracotta expressing the pietas of Aeneas, who carries his aged father and leads his young son

The epic poem consists of 12 books in dactylic hexameter verse. The Aeneid's first six books describe the journey of Aeneas from Troy to Rome. Virgil made use of several models in the composition of his epic; Homer, the pre-eminent author of classical epic, is everywhere present, but Virgil also makes special use of the Latin poet Ennius and the Hellenistic poet Apollonius of Rhodes, among other writers to whom he alludes. Although the Aeneid casts itself firmly into the epic mode, it often expands the genre by including elements of other genres, such as tragedy and aetiological poetry. Ancient commentators noted that Virgil seems to divide the Aeneid into two sections based on the poetry of Homer; the first six books were viewed as employing the Odyssey as a model while the last six were connected to the Iliad.

Book 1, (Note: For a succinct summary, see Globalnet.co.uk) at the head of the Odyssean section, opens with a storm which Juno, Aeneas's enemy throughout the poem, stirs up against the fleet. The storm drives the hero to the coast of Carthage, which was Rome's deadliest foe. The queen, Dido, welcomes the ancestor of the Romans, and under the influence of the gods falls deeply in love with him. At a banquet in Book 2, Aeneas tells the story of the sack of Troy, the death of his wife, and his escape, to the enthralled Carthaginians, while in Book 3 he recounts to them his wanderings over the Mediterranean in search of a suitable new home. Jupiter in Book 4 recalls the lingering Aeneas to his duty to found a new city, and he slips away from Carthage, leaving Dido to commit suicide, cursing Aeneas and calling down revenge in symbolic anticipation of the fierce wars between Carthage and Rome. In Book 5, funeral games are celebrated for Aeneas's father Anchises, who had died a year before. On reaching Cumae, in Italy in Book 6, Aeneas consults the Cumaean Sibyl, who conducts him through the Underworld where Aeneas meets the dead Anchises who reveals Rome's destiny to his son.

Book 7, beginning the Iliadic half, opens with an address to the muse and recounts Aeneas's arrival in Italy and betrothal to Lavinia, daughter of King Latinus. Lavinia had already been promised to Turnus, the king of the Rutulians, who is roused to war by the Fury Allecto and Amata, Lavinia's mother. In Book 8, Aeneas allies with King Evander, who occupies the future site of Rome, and is given new armour and a shield depicting Roman history. Book 9 records an assault by Nisus and Euryalus on the Rutulians; Book 10, the death of Evander's young son Pallas; and 11 the death of the Volscian warrior princess Camilla and the decision to settle the war with a duel between Aeneas and Turnus. The Aeneid ends in Book 12 with the taking of Latinus's city, the death of Amata, and Aeneas's defeat and killing of Turnus, whose pleas for mercy are spurned. The final book ends with the image of Turnus's soul lamenting as it flees to the underworld.

=== Reception of the Aeneid ===
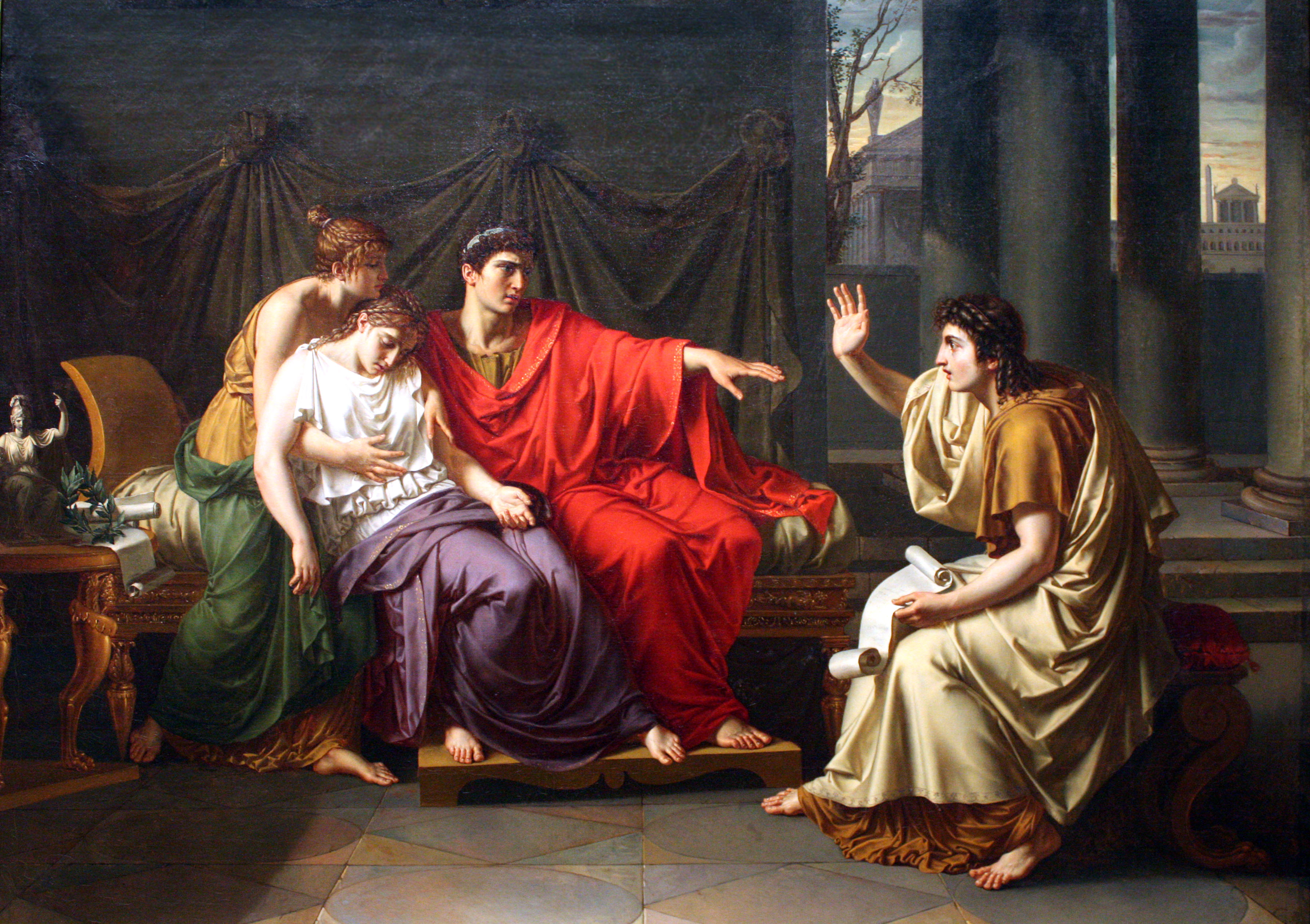
Virgil Reading the Aeneid to Augustus, Octavia, and Livia by Jean-Baptiste Wicar, Art Institute of Chicago

Critics of the Aeneid focus on a variety of issues. (Note: For a bibliography and summary see Fowler, pp. 1605–1606.) The tone as a whole is a particular matter of debate; some see the poem as ultimately pessimistic and politically subversive to the Augustan regime, while others view it as a celebration of the new imperial dynasty. Virgil makes use of the symbolism of the regime, and some scholars see strong associations between Augustus and Aeneas, the one as founder and the other as re-founder of Rome. A strong teleology, or drive towards a climax, has been detected. The Aeneid is full of prophecies about the future of Rome, the deeds of Augustus, his ancestors, and famous Romans, and the Carthaginian Wars; the shield of Aeneas even depicts Augustus's victory at Actium against Mark Antony and Cleopatra in 31 BC. A further focus of study is the character of Aeneas. As the protagonist, Aeneas seems to waver constantly between his emotions and commitment to his prophetic duty to found Rome; critics note the breakdown of Aeneas's emotional control in the last sections of the poem where the "pious" and "righteous" Aeneas mercilessly slaughters Turnus.

The Aeneid appears to have been a great success. Virgil is said to have recited Books 2, 4, and 6 to Augustus; and Book 6 apparently caused the emperor's sister Octavia to faint. Although the truth of this claim is subject to scholarly scepticism, it has served as a basis for art, such as Jean-Baptiste Wicar's Virgil Reading the Aeneid.

Some lines of the poem were left unfinished, and the whole was unedited, at Virgil's death in 19 BC. As a result, the text of the Aeneid that exists may contain faults which Virgil was planning to correct before publication. However, the only obvious imperfections are a few lines of verse that are metrically unfinished, i.e. not a complete line of dactylic hexameter. Some scholars have argued that Virgil deliberately left these incomplete for dramatic effect. Other alleged imperfections are subject to debate.

== Legacy and reception ==
=== Antiquity ===
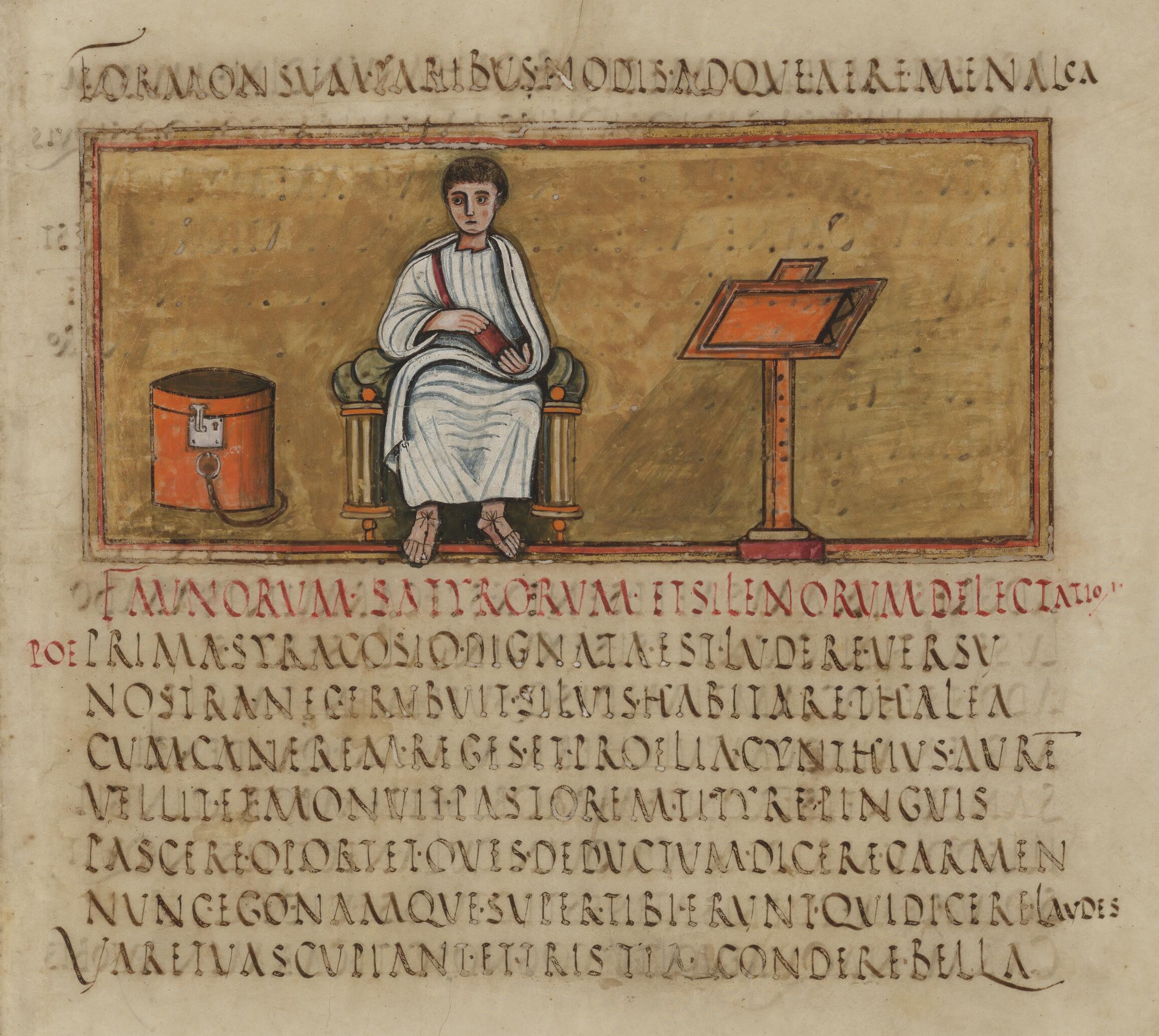
A 5th-century portrait of Virgil from the Vergilius Romanus

The works of Virgil, almost from the moment of their publication, revolutionized Latin poetry. The Eclogues, Georgics, and above all the Aeneid became standard texts in school curricula with which all educated Romans were familiar. Poets following Virgil often refer intertextually to his works to generate meaning in their poetry. The Augustan poet Ovid parodies the opening lines of the Aeneid in Amores 1.1.1–2, and his summary of the Aeneas story in Book 14 of the Metamorphoses, the so-called "mini-Aeneid", has been viewed as an important example of post-Virgilian response to the epic genre. Lucan's epic, the Bellum Civile, has been considered an anti-Virgilian epic, disposing of the divine mechanism, treating historical events, and diverging from Virgilian epic practice. The Flavian-era poet Statius in his 12-book epic Thebaid engages closely with the poetry of Virgil; in his epilogue he advises his poem not to "rival the divine Aeneid, but follow afar and ever venerate its footsteps". Virgil finds one of his most ardent admirers in Silius Italicus. With almost every line of his epic Punica, Silius references Virgil.

Virgil also found commentators in antiquity. Servius, a commentator of the 4th century AD, based his work on the commentary of Donatus. Servius's commentary provides us with a great deal of information about Virgil's life, sources, and references; however, many modern scholars find the variable quality of his work and the often simplistic interpretations frustrating.

=== Late antiquity ===
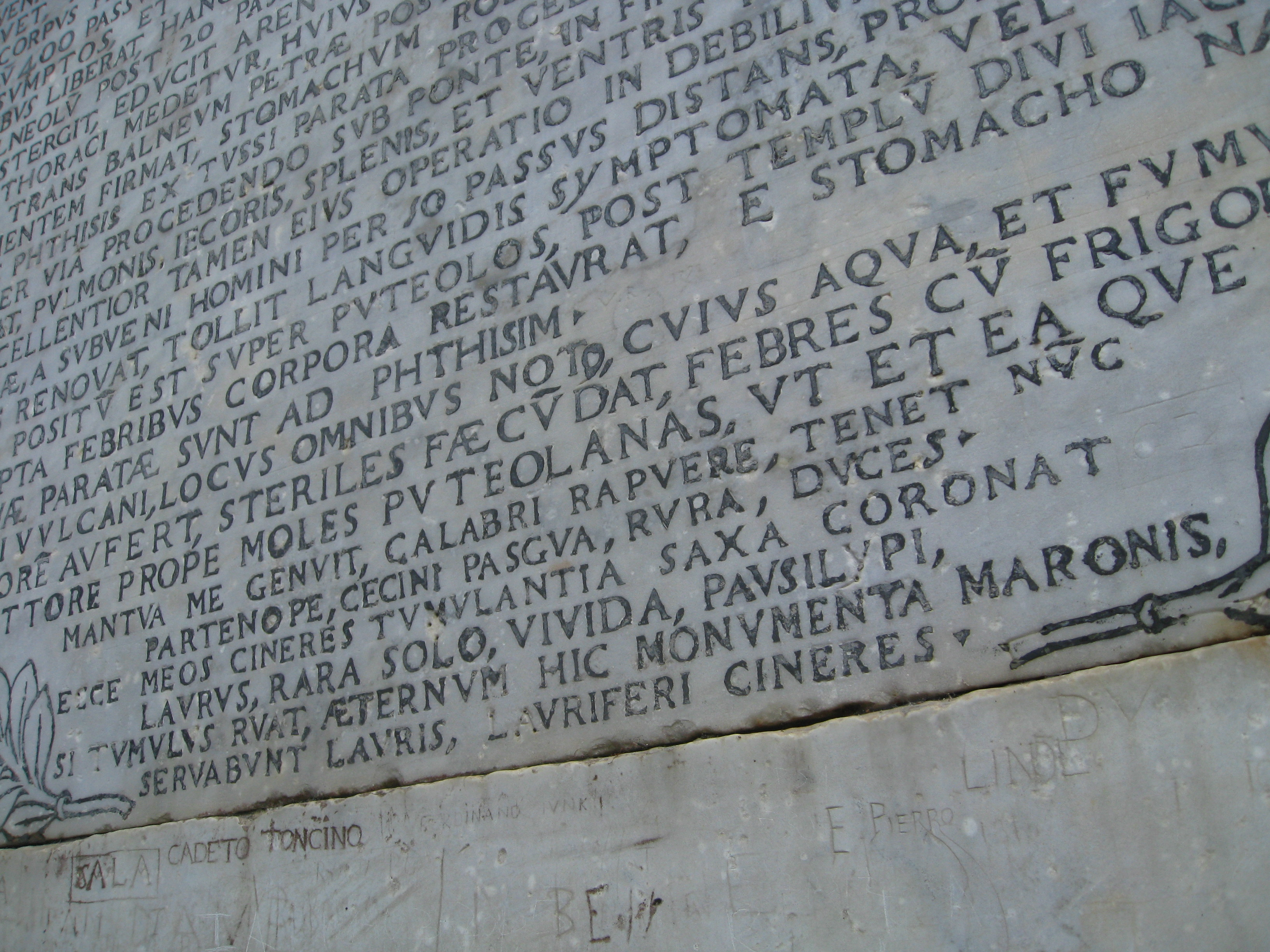
The verse inscription at Virgil's tomb was supposedly composed by the poet himself: Mantua me genuit, Calabri rapuere, tenet nunc Parthenope. Cecini pascua, rura, duces. ("Mantua gave me life, the Calabrians took it away, Naples holds me now; I sang of pastures, farms, and commanders" [transl. Bernard Knox])

Even as the Western Roman Empire collapsed, literate men acknowledged that Virgil was a master poet; Augustine of Hippo confessed how he had wept at reading the death of Dido. The best-known surviving manuscripts of Virgil's works include manuscripts from late antiquity, such as the Vergilius Augusteus, the Vergilius Vaticanus and the Vergilius Romanus.

=== Middle Ages ===
Gregory of Tours read Virgil, whom he quotes in several places, along with other Latin poets, though he cautions that "we ought not to relate their lying fables, lest we fall under sentence of eternal death". In the Renaissance of the 12th century, Alexander Neckham placed the "divine" Aeneid on his standard arts curriculum, and Dido became the romantic heroine of the age. Monks like Maiolus of Cluny might repudiate what they called "the luxurious eloquence of Virgil", but they could not deny the power of his appeal.

Dante presents Virgil as his guide through Hell and the greater part of Purgatory in the Divine Comedy. He also mentions Virgil in De vulgari eloquentia, as one of the four regulati poetae along with Ovid, Lucan and Statius (ii, vi, 7).

=== Renaissance and early modernity ===
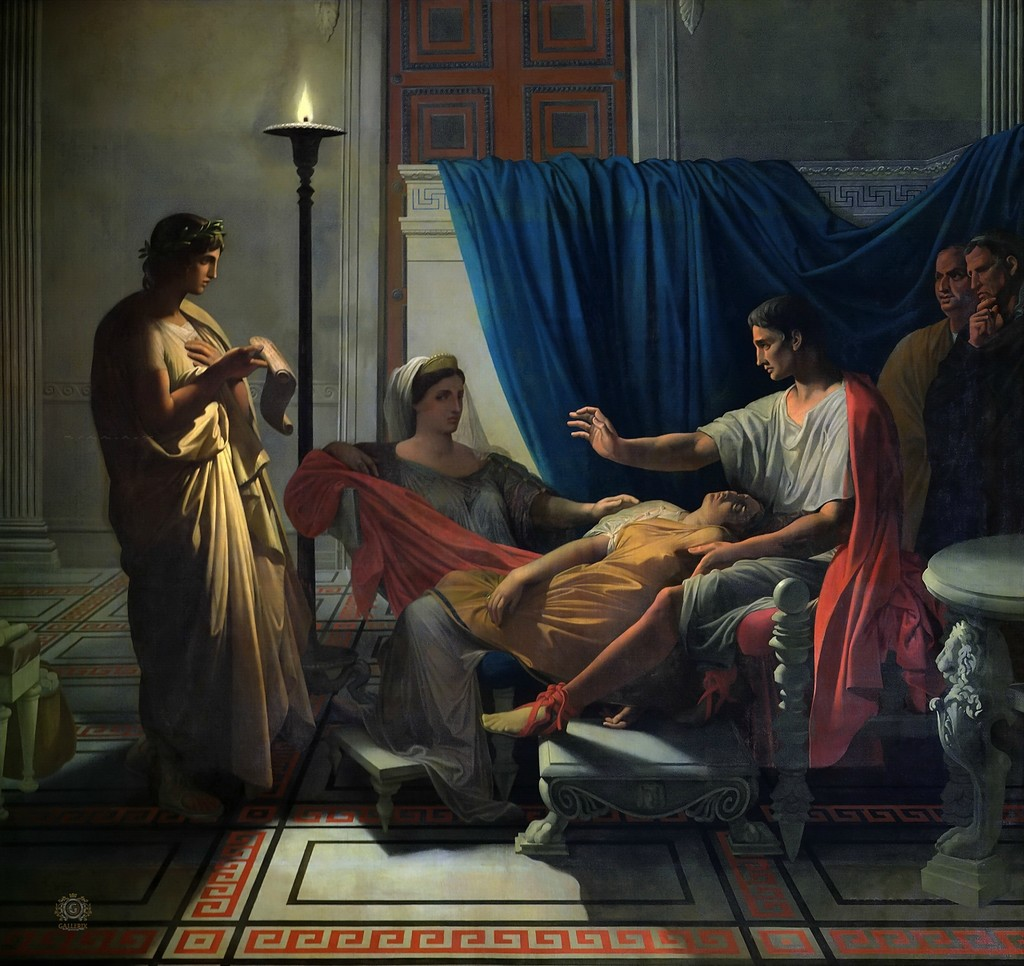
Virgil reading The Aeneid before Augustus, Livia and Octavia (1812, later reworked), Toulouse, Musée des Augustins

Several epics arrived in Virgil's wake, notably Edmund Spenser's The Faerie Queene and John Milton's Paradise Lost. He inspired works in other fields, including Ingres's painting Virgil reading The Aeneid before Augustus, Livia and Octavia, Berlioz's opera Les Troyens and Hermann Broch's novel The Death of Virgil.

In the early modern period until the middle of the 18th century, Virgil was often regarded as the preeminent poet that European poets should try to emulate. A shift began in Germany when classical Greek culture rose in prestige at the expense of Roman, notably through the influence of Johann Joachim Winckelmann. In spite of a loss in prestige, Virgil continued to be widely read and studied, and had significant influence also on German-language writers from the second half of the 18th century, such as Salomon Gessner, Maler Müller, Johann Heinrich Voß, Johann Wolfgang von Goethe and Novalis.

Alfred, Lord Tennyson wrote:

I salute thee, Mantovano,
I that loved thee since my day began,
Wielder of the stateliest measure
ever moulded by the lips of man.

— Alfred, Lord Tennyson, "To Virgil, Written at the Request of the Mantuans for the Nineteenth Centenary of Virgil's Death"

=== Legends ===
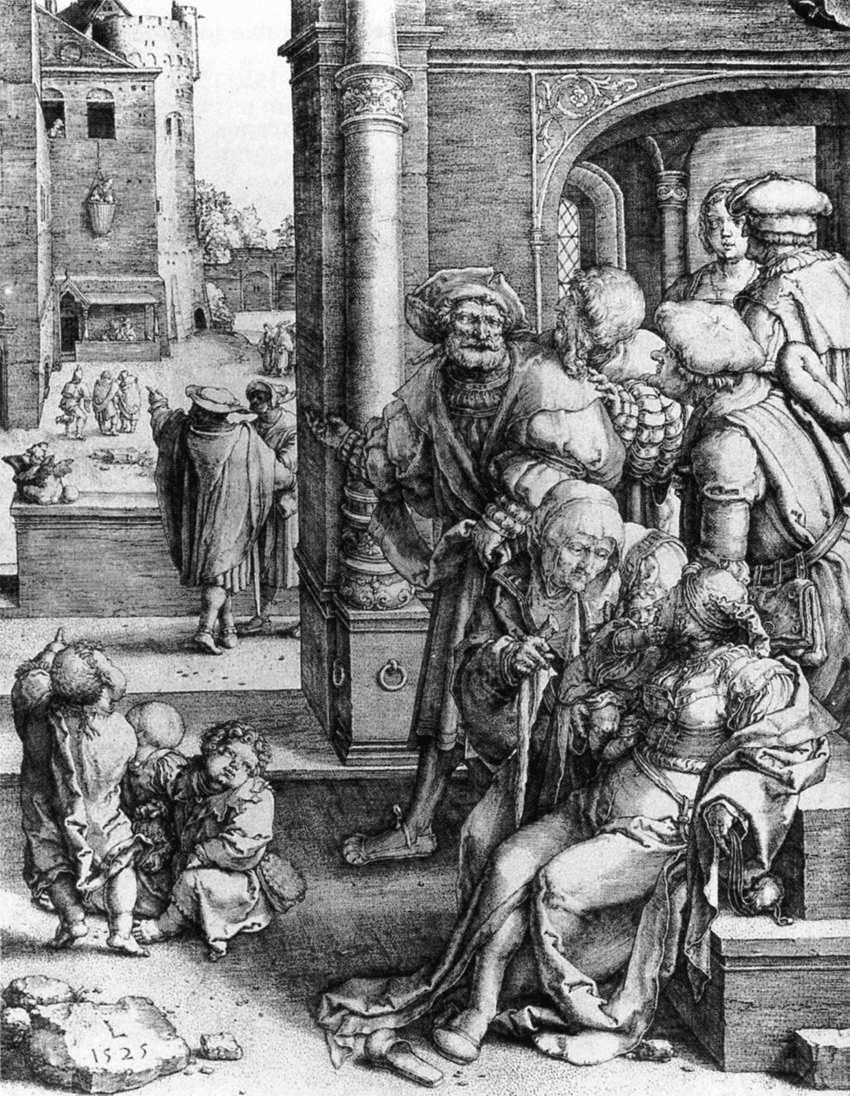
Virgil in His Basket, Lucas van Leyden, 1525 (basket top left)

The legend of "Virgil in his basket" arose in the Middle Ages, and is often seen in art and mentioned in literature as part of the Power of Women literary topos, demonstrating the disruptive force of female attractiveness on men. In this story Virgil became enamoured of a beautiful woman, sometimes described as the emperor's daughter or mistress and called Lucretia. She played him along and agreed to an assignation at her house, which he was to sneak into at night, by climbing into a large basket let down from a window. When he did so he was hoisted only halfway up the wall and left trapped there into the next day, exposed to public ridicule. The story paralleled that of Phyllis riding Aristotle. Among other artists depicting the scene, Lucas van Leyden made a woodcut and later an engraving.

Partially as a result of his so-called "Messianic" Eclogue 4 – interpreted from the 3rd century by Christian thinkers to have predicted the birth of Jesus – Virgil was in later antiquity imputed to have the magical abilities of a seer. Eclogue 4 describes the birth of a boy ushering in a golden age. In consequence, Virgil came to be seen on a similar level to the Hebrew prophets of the Bible as one who had heralded Christianity. The Jewish Encyclopedia argues that medieval legends about the golem may have been inspired by Virgilian legends about the poet's apocryphal power to bring inanimate objects to life.

Possibly as early as the 2nd century AD, and into the Middle Ages, Virgil's works were seen as having magical properties and used for divination. In what became known as the Sortes Vergilianae ("Virgilian Lots"), passages would be selected at random and interpreted to answer questions. In a similar vein, Macrobius in the Saturnalia credits the work of Virgil as the embodiment of human knowledge and experience, mirroring the Greek conception of Homer. In the 12th century, starting around Naples but eventually spreading throughout Europe, a tradition developed in which Virgil was regarded as a great magician. Legends about Virgil and his magical powers remained popular for over two hundred years, arguably becoming as prominent as his writings. In medieval Wales, the Welsh version of his name, Fferyllt or Pheryllt, became a generic term for magic-worker, and survives in its word for pharmacist, fferyllydd.

== Citations ==
=== Works cited ===
- Braunholtz, G. E. K. (June 1915). "The Nationality of Vergil". The Classical Review. 29 (4): 104–110. doi:10.1017/S0009840X00048368. JSTOR 696876.
- Brummer, Jacob, ed. (1912). Vitae Vergilianae. Leipzig: B. G. Teubner.
- Conway, R. S. (January 1923). "Where Was Vergil's Farm?". Bulletin of the John Rylands Library. 7 (2): 184–210. doi:10.7227/BJRL.7.2.2.
- Conway, R. S. (April 1931). "Further Considerations on the Site of Vergil's Farm". The Classical Quarterly. 25 (2): 65–76. doi:10.1017/S0009838800013483.
- Nettleship, H. (1879). Ancient Lives of Vergil. Oxford: Clarendon Press.
- Rand, Edward Kennard (1930). In Quest of Virgil's Birthplace. Cambridge, MA: Harvard University Press.
