= Magia Polla =

Mother of Roman poet Virgil

Magia Polla (known also as Maia, fl. I century BC) was an ancient Roman woman, mother of the poet Vergil.

== Biography ==
Magia Polla was the daughter of Magius, a rich merchant of the Magia gens, and perhaps had Celtic origins on her mother's side.

She married Virgilius Maro Ficulus, a potter who was initially employed by her father, but who later gained some wealth as a beekeeper and small landowner.

They had three sons: Silus, Flaccus and Virgilius (70 BC - 19 BC), who became one of the greatest Roman poets.

After her husband's death, Magia remarried and had another son, Proculus.
