= Magia gens =

Ancient Roman family

The gens Magia was a plebeian family at ancient Rome. Members of this gens are first mentioned at the time of the Second Punic War. Although several of them performed useful service to the Roman state, none of the Magii ever held the consulship.

== Origin ==
The Magii were from Campania, and at the time of the Second Punic War they were among the leading families at Capua. That conflict divided the Magii, some of whom wished to ally with Hannibal, while others supported the alliance with Rome. One of them bore the surname Atellanus, having come from the Campanian town of Atella, perhaps the family's ultimate origin. Minatus Magius, an ancestor of the historian Velleius Paterculus, received the Roman franchise as a result of his loyal service to Rome during the Social War. His surname, Aeculanensis, suggests that a branch of the Magii settled at Aeculanum during the second century BC.

== Praenomina ==
The earliest Magii appearing in history were Campanians, and bore distinctly Oscan praenomina, such as Decius and Minatus, as well as the more familiar Gnaeus, which was also a common Latin name. The Roman Magii used Publius, Lucius, Gnaeus, and Numerius, of which the last was relatively scarce at Rome, especially among the aristocracy, although more widespread among the plebeians and in the countryside.

== Members ==
This list includes abbreviated praenomina. For an explanation of this practice, see filiation.

- Gnaeus Magius Atellanus, a supporter of Hannibal during the Second Punic War. He was the meddix turicus, or chief magistrate, at Capua in 214 BC.
- Decius Magius, leader of the pro-Roman party at Capua during the Second Punic War. He argued strenuously against the city's surrender to Hannibal in 216 BC, but was sent to Carthage after the city opened its gates to the Carthaginian. A storm drove his ship to Cyrene, and he escaped to Egypt. His descendant, Velleius Paterculus, calls him Campanorum princeps celeberrimus et nobilissimus vir, "first among the Campanians, a most famous and noble man."
- Minatus Magius Aeculanensis, (Note: Frequently found as Minatius Magius, but Minatus was an Oscan praenomen, easily confused with its derived patronymic surname Minatius. Similarly, Asculanensis is sometimes substituted for the less familiar Aeculanensis.) grandson of Decius Magius, during the Social War raised a legion of soldiers loyal to Rome from among the Hirpini. For his loyalty and considerable help in the war, he was granted the Roman franchise, and two of his sons are said to have become praetor. The historian Marcus Velleius Paterculus was his adnepos. (Note: Great-great-great-grandson.)
- Publius Magius, tribune of the plebs in 87 BC. Cicero described him as an orator of some note.
- Magius, a prefect under Gaius Calpurnius Piso in Gallia Narbonensis, during the latter's proconsulship, from 66 to 65 BC.
- Lucius Magius, together with Lucius Fannius, served in the army of Flavius Fimbria during the First Mithridatic War, but they deserted and went over to Mithridates, whom they persuaded to negotiate with Sertorius. The Senate declared them public enemies, but they continued to assist Mithridates through the Third Mithridatic War.
- Gnaeus Magius, the brother-in-law of Oppianicus, a notorious poisoner suspected of murdering Magius in order to inherit his fortune.
- Magia, one of several women whom Oppianicus married in order to gain their fortunes.
- Numerius Magius, (Note: Called Gnaeus Magius by Caesar.) a native of Cremona, and praefectus fabrum in the army of Pompeius during the Civil War. He was captured while traveling to meet Pompeius at Brundisium in 49 BC; Caesar allowed him to continue on his way, bearing an offer of peace.
- Publius Magius Cilo, stabbed to death the ex-consul M. Claudius Marcellus in 45 BC, and afterwards took his own life.
- Magia Polla, mother of the poet Virgil.
- Lucius Magius, an orator, and son-in-law of the historian Livy.
- Magius Celer, adoptive father of Velleianus.
- Magius Celer Velleianus, brother of the historian Velleius Paterculus, was adopted by one of his relatives. He and his brother were the emperor's candidates for the praetorship at the time of Augustus' death in AD 14, and were again nominated by Tiberius.
- Magius Caecilianus, praetor in AD 21, was falsely accused of treason by two equites, but acquitted, and his accusers punished.
- Lucius Magius Urgulanianus, adopted from the gens Urgulania.

== See also ==
- List of Roman gentes

== Bibliography ==
- Marcus Tullius Cicero, Brutus, De Oratore, In Verrem, Pro Cluentio, Epistulae ad Atticum, Epistulae ad Familiares.
- Gaius Julius Caesar, Commentarii de Bello Civili (Commentaries on the Civil War).
- Titus Livius (Livy), History of Rome.
- Lucius Annaeus Seneca (Seneca the Elder), Controversiae.
- Marcus Velleius Paterculus, Compendium of Roman History.
- Publius Cornelius Tacitus, Annales.
- Lucius Mestrius Plutarchus (Plutarch), Lives of the Noble Greeks and Romans.
- Appianus Alexandrinus (Appian), Bella Mithridatica (The Mithridatic Wars).
- Paulus Orosius, Historiarum Adversum Paganos (History Against the Pagans).
- Dictionary of Greek and Roman Biography and Mythology, William Smith, ed., Little, Brown and Company, Boston (1849).
- T. Robert S. Broughton, The Magistrates of the Roman Republic, American Philological Association (1952).
- Olli Salomies, Adoptive and Polyonymous Nomenclature in the Roman Empire, Societas Scientiarum Fenica, Helsinki (1992).
- Antonio La Penna, La letteratura latina del primo periodo augusteo (42-15 a.C.) (The Latin Literature of the First Augustan Period), Gius. Laterza & Figli Spa (2013).
