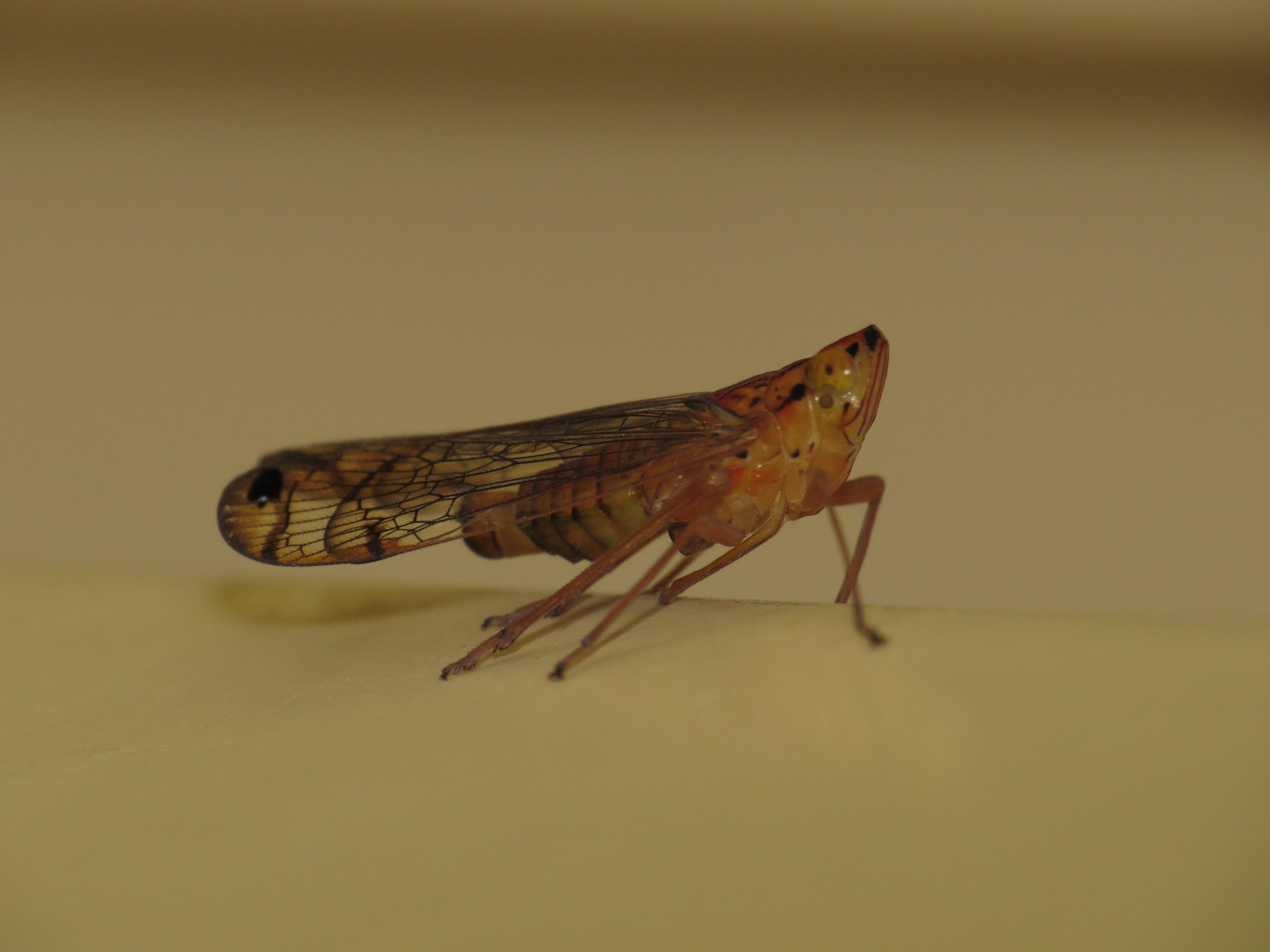
- Magia subocellata

Scientific classification
- Domain: Eukaryota
- Kingdom: Animalia
- Phylum: Arthropoda
- Class: Insecta
- Order: Hemiptera
- Suborder: Auchenorrhyncha
- Infraorder: Fulgoromorpha
- Family: Lophopidae
- Subfamily: Menoscinae
- Tribe: Acarnini
- Genus: Magia; Distant, 1907

= Magia (planthopper) =

Genus of insects

Magia is a genus of Australian planthoppers in the tribe Acarnini, classified by William Lucas Distant in 1907.

== Species ==
Fulgoromorpha Lists on the Web includes:

1. Magia stuarti Soulier-Perkins, 2008
2. Magia subocellata Distant, 1907 - type species
