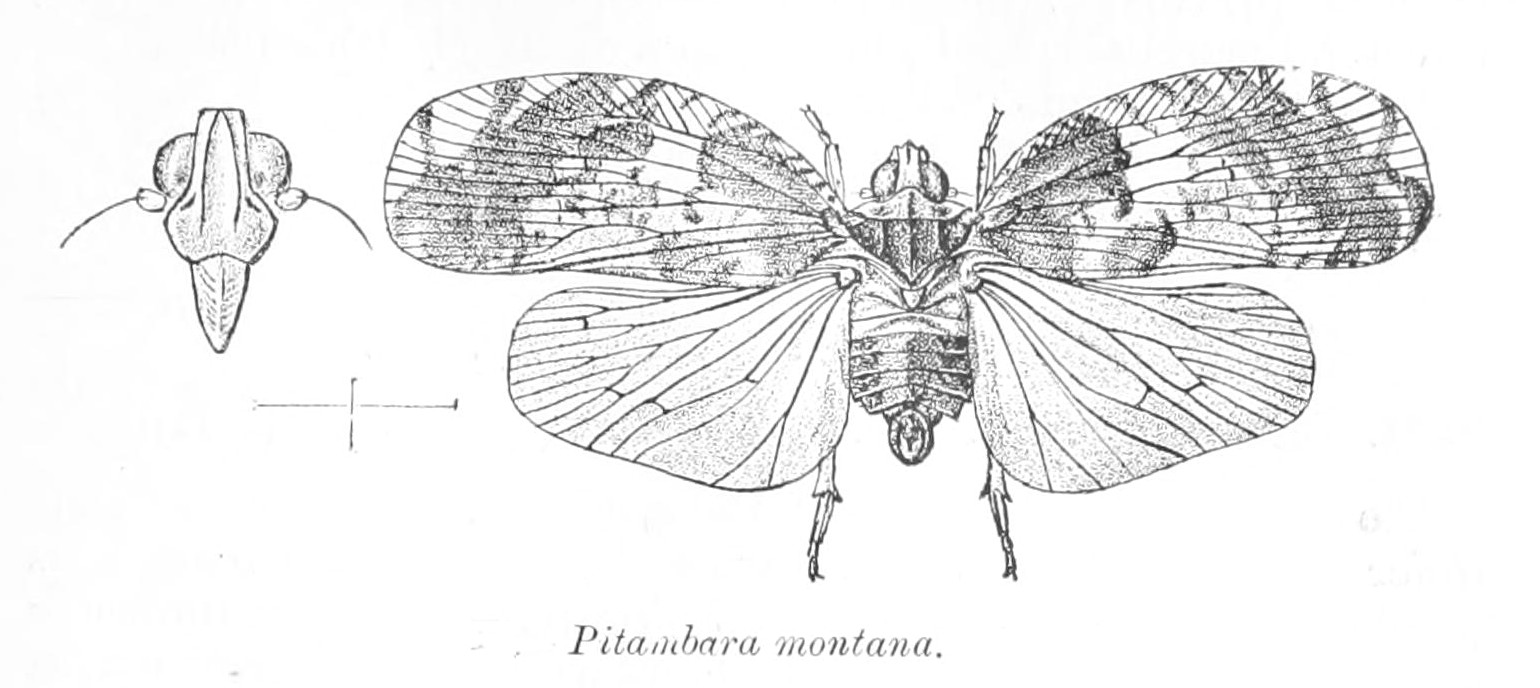
- Pitambara montana and frontal view of the face

Scientific classification
- Kingdom: Animalia
- Phylum: Arthropoda
- Clade: Pancrustacea
- Class: Insecta
- Order: Hemiptera
- Suborder: Auchenorrhyncha
- Infraorder: Fulgoromorpha
- Superfamily: Fulgoroidea
- Family: Lophopidae; Stål, 1866

= Lophopidae =

Family of planthoppers

Lophopidae is a family of fulgoroid plant-hoppers with most species found in tropical South America and Asia (two genera occur in Africa).

== Characteristics ==
Most members of the family are characterized by the face being longer than wide with at least two lateral ridges (the median ridge/carina may be absent). The hind tibia can bear some spines, two to three (about four may be seen in the Eurybrachyidae). Lateral ocelli are present below the compound eye and slightly in front of it. The wings are broad and held somewhat flat and the wings are often patterned. The nymphs have two long tails and many members have slightly flattened front tibiae.

== Subfamilies, tribes and genera ==
Two subfamilies are currently recognised; the Catalogue of Life and FLOW list:

=== Lophopinae ===
Auth.: Stål, 1866

- Tribe Lophopini Stål, 1866 (Africa, Asia)
- Acothrura Melichar, 1915
- Asantorga Melichar, 1915 (monotypic)
- Corethrura Hope, 1843
- Jivatma - monotypic Jivatma metallica Distant, 1906
- Katoma Baker, 1925
- Lacusa Stål, 1862
- Lophops Spinola, 1839 - type genus
- Maracota Emeljanov, 2018
- Paracorethrura Melichar, 1915
- Pitambara Distant, 1906
- Podoschtroumpfa Soulier-Perkins, 1998
- Pyrilla Stål, 1859
- Sarebasa Distant, 1909
- Sarmatoca Emeljanov, 2018 (monotypic)
- Serida Walker, 1857
- Silvispina Wang & Soulier-Perkins, 2016 (monotypic)

=== Menoscinae ===
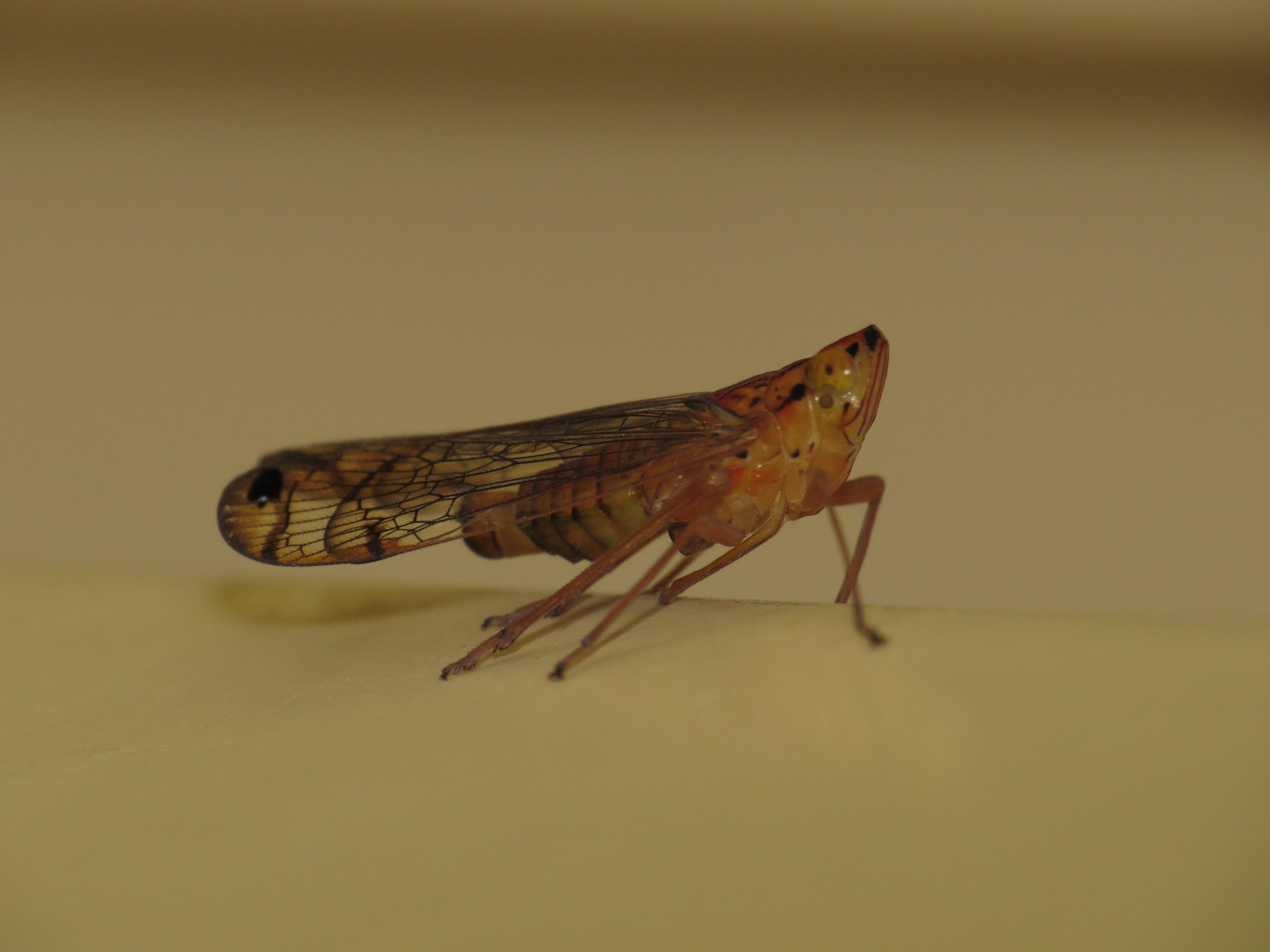
Magia subocellata

Auth.: Melichar, 1915; selected genera:

- Tribe Acarnini Baker, 1925 (New Guinea, Australia)
  - Acarna Stål, 1863
  - Magia Distant, 1907
  - Zophiuma Fennah, 1955
- Tribe Carrioniini Emeljanov, 2013 (Central & South America: monogeneric)
  - Carrionia Muir, 1931
- Tribe Elasmoscelini Melichar, 1915 (Africa, Asia: Japan, Indochina, Java: monogeneric)
  - Elasmoscelis Spinola, 1839
- Tribe Menoscini Melichar, 1915 (Indo-China, Malesia)
  - Menosca Stål, 1870
- Tribe Virgiliini Emeljanov, 2013 (New Guinea, Philippines)
  - Virgilia Stål, 1870

=== incertae sedis ===
  - †Baninus Szwedo & Wappler, 2006
  - Binaluana Soulier-Perkins & Stroinski, 2015 (Philippines)
  - †Cintux Stroinski & Szwedo, 2012
  - †Gesaris Szwedo, Stroinski & Lin, 2015
  - Lacusa orientalis Liang, 2000 (S. China, Laos, Vietnam)
  - †Ordralfabetix Szwedo, 2011
  - Panegu Soulier-Perkins & Stroinski, 2016 (PNG)
  - †Scoparidea Cockerell, 1920
  - Silvispina Wang & Soulier-Perkins, 2016
