= William Symonds (disambiguation) =

William Symonds was a British Surveyor of the Navy in the 19th century.

William Symonds may also refer to:

- William Symonds (priest) (1556–1616), English supporter of the Virginia colony
- William Cornwallis Symonds (1810–1841), British Army officer
- William R. Symonds (1851–1934), English painter
- William Samuel Symonds (1818–1887), English geologist

== See also ==
- William Simonds (disambiguation)
