= British Emperor =

British title

The term "emperor" has sometimes informally been retroactively applied to a few mythical and historical rulers of Great Britain, Ireland or the United Kingdom. It was sometimes used informally to designate either Plantagenet or Tudor caesaropapism. The reliable sources of British history do not use the term "British Emperor", nor did the government. The term "British Empire" is an unofficial designation and does not imply there was a person called "emperor",

The term "Emperor of India" was officially a title for Queen Victoria and her successors down to 1948. There was never an official entity named "Empire of India". See British Raj for the part of India under the British Crown.

== Mythical British kings ==
The mythical British ruler King Arthur is referred to in medieval Welsh texts as ameraudur (meaning "emperor"). The Welsh poem Geraint, son of Erbin, written in the 10th or 11th century, describes a battle at a port-settlement and mentions Arthur in passing. The work is a praise-poem and elegy for the 6th-century king Geraint, provides the earliest known reference to Arthur as "emperor".

== Britannic Empire ==
The Britannic Empire was a short-lived breakaway state of the Roman Empire in the late Roman Period. It was formed as a result of the revolt by the naval commander Carausius. It ended when Carausius's usurper, Allectus, was defeated by the Emperor Constantius I in 296.

== Imperial ambitions (930–1066) ==
Several Kings of England displayed imperial ambition in the period from 930 to 1066, using a variety of what would be considered imperial titles. The most common title was basileus, but imperator, princeps, augustus, and caesar were all used sporadically.

- Athelstan (c. 895–939), a collector of imperial relics, had himself proclaimed "imperator" in 930, six years after the death of the last Carolingian emperor. Variants that he used throughout his reign include such formulations as "king of the Anglo-Saxons and emperor of the Northumbrians" (Rex Angulsexna and Norþhymbra imperator). He was also one of many to use the Anglo-Saxon title of Bretwalda ("wielder of the strength of Britain", sometimes rendered Brutenwealde).
- Edgar the Peaceful (c. 943–975) legendarily took homage from eight lesser kings during an excursion on the River Dee. During his lifetime, he issued royal charters proclaiming himself as Anglorum Basileus and totius Albionis Basileus, among other variants.
- Ethelred the Unready (c. 966–1016) was noted for being especially fond of high titles during his reign.
- Canute the Great (994/995–1035) ruled England, Norway, and Denmark through personal union and lacked formal imperial title during his lifetime, though he followed Anglo-Saxon tradition. The lands which he ruled are commonly referred to as the North Sea Empire.
- Edward the Confessor (c. 1003–1066) continued the occasional use of imperial titles after the restoration of the House of Wessex, but the kings of England largely ceased referring to themselves as emperors following the Norman Conquest.

== Norman Era: Empress Maud (Matilda) ==
In this case the epithet "Empress" was rather used to distinguish this person from other princesses called Matilda or Maud. Matilda was not Empress of Britain; she took her title from her previous marriage to Holy Roman Emperor Henry V.

Richard of Cornwall claimed the title King of the Romans during the German Interregnum but was never crowned emperor by the pope. Edward III was elected anti-king in 1348 by the Wittelsbach faction but declined his election.

== The "Imperium Maius" issue ==
Although several English monarchs flirted with the idea of "imperial" power, this never led to an official change of the title of "King/Queen" to "Emperor/Empress".

=== Imperium maius ===
In Christian Europe the use of the title emperor was more than an affectation. A king recognises that the church is an equal or superior in the religious sphere; emperors do not. This was illustrated by Henry VIII of England who started to use the word imperium in his dispute with Pope Clement VII over the annulment of his first marriage. The distinction began to blur when kings began to claim divine rights.

=== English kings and the imperium maius ===
William II, Duke of Normandy (who became William the Conqueror), thought it important enough to request and get a papal blessing for his conquest of England. Richard I refused to show deference to Henry VI, Holy Roman Emperor when held prisoner by him, declaring "I am born of a rank which recognizes no superior but God". After Henry I agreed to the Concordat of London in 1107, the English kings recognised the supremacy of the Pope in matters spiritual. For example, when Thomas Becket was murdered, Henry II was forced to recognise that, although he ruled temporal matters, spiritual matters came under the authority of the Church in Rome.

This changed with the dispute between Henry VIII and Pope Clement VII over Henry's wish to have his marriage to Catherine of Aragon annulled. The Act in Restraint of Appeals (1533) explicitly stated that

Where by divers sundry old authentic histories and chronicles it is manifestly declared and expressed that this realm of England is an empire, and so hath been accepted in the world, governed by one supreme head and king, having the dignity and royal estate of the imperial crown of the same.

The next year the First Act of Supremacy (1534) explicitly tied the head of church to the imperial crown:

The only supreme head in earth of the Church of England called Anglicana Ecclesia, and shall have and enjoy annexed and united to the imperial crown of this realm.

The Crown of Ireland Act, passed by the Irish Parliament in 1541 (effective 1542), changed the traditional title used by the Monarchs of England for the reign over Ireland, from Lord of Ireland to King of Ireland and naming Henry head of the Church of Ireland, for similar reasons.

During the reign of Mary I, the First Act of Supremacy was annulled, but during the reign of Elizabeth I the Second Act of Supremacy, with similar wording to the First Act, was passed in 1559. During the English Interregnum the laws were annulled, but the acts which caused the laws to be in abeyance were themselves deemed to be null and void by the Parliaments of the English Restoration, so by act of Parliament the Crown of England (and later the British and UK crowns) are imperial crowns.

== George III as emperor ==
In 1801 the United Kingdom of Great Britain and Ireland was created after the merging of the British and Irish parliaments. It was suggested that George III be declared Emperor of the British Isles. He declined and became king of "the United Kingdom of Great Britain and Ireland".

Parliament used the terms "empire" and "imperial". Blackstone commented in 1765 "The meaning ... of the legislature, when it uses these terms of empire and imperial, and applies them to the realm and crown of England, is only to assert that our king is equally sovereign and independent within these his dominions, as any emperor is in his empire."

== British monarchs with the title Emperor/Empress of India (1876–1948) ==
The British government led by Benjamin Disraeli conferred the additional title Empress of India on Queen Victoria by an Act of Parliament, with effect from 1 May 1876, reputedly to assuage the monarch's irritation at being, as queen, notionally inferior to her daughter Victoria, the future German empress. The Indian Imperial designation was also formally justified as the expression of Britain succeeding the former Mughal emperor as paramount ruler of the subcontinent, using indirect rule through hundreds of princely states formally under protection, not colonies, but accepting the British sovereign as their "feudal" suzerain.

The title of Emperor of India was not immediately relinquished by George VI when India and Pakistan gained independence on 15 August 1947, as he continued to be king of each of the two new dominions, but he abandoned the title with effect from 22 June 1948.

== See also ==
- Style of the British Sovereign
- British Constantine
- British Empire
- Imperator totius Hispaniae
