= Cumaean Sibyl =

Priestess presiding over the Apollonian oracle at Cumae

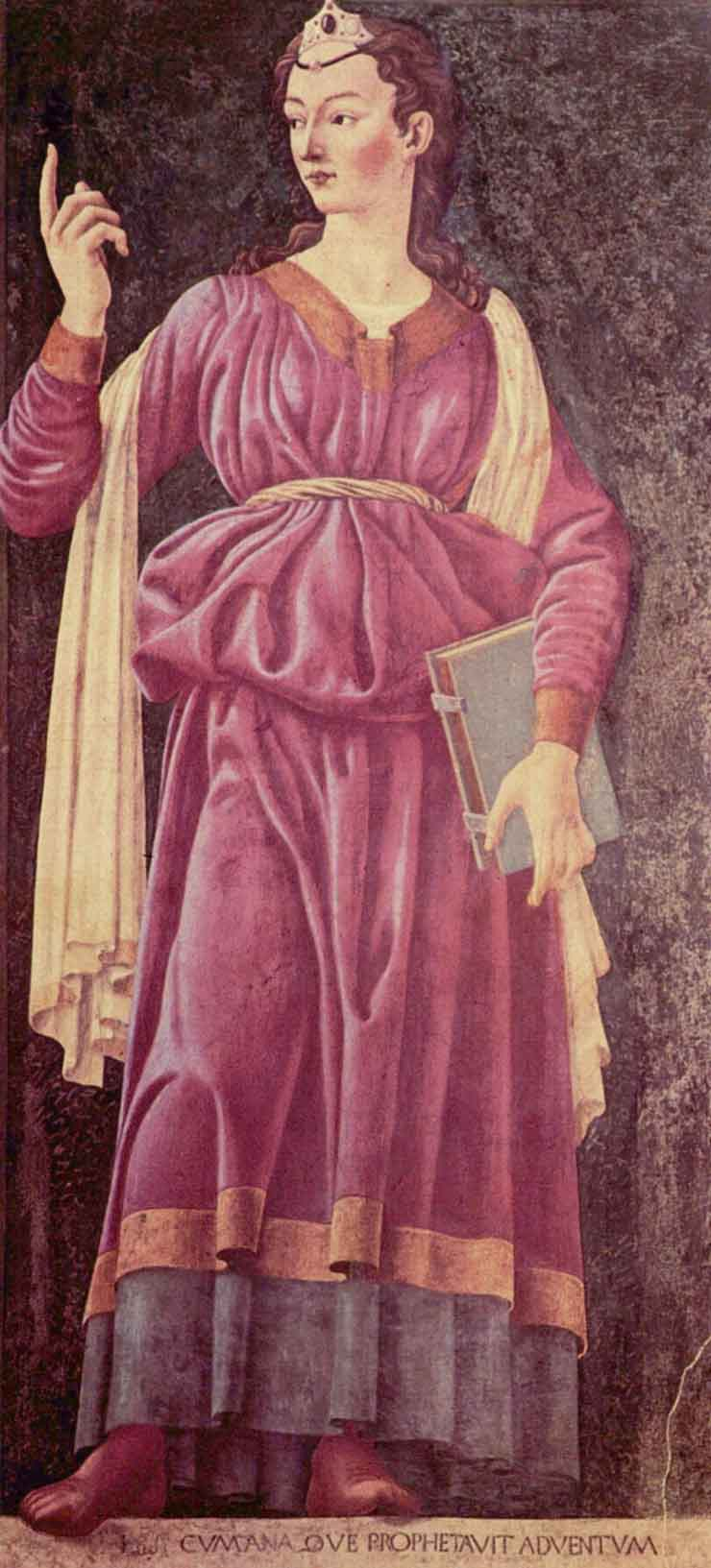
Cumaean Sibyl by Andrea del Castagno

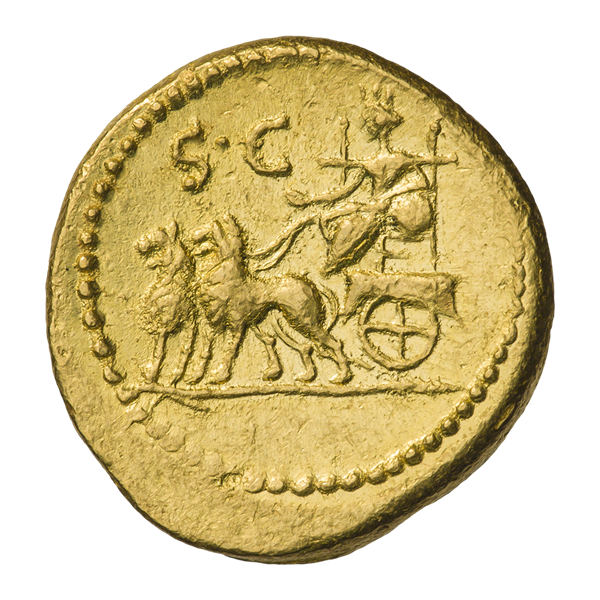
Cumaean Sibyl on a coin of 43 BC, shown riding in a biga drawn by lions with a patera in her hand

The Cumaean Sibyl (/kjuːˈmiːən/ kew-MEE-ən; Latin: Sibylla Cumana) was the priestess presiding over the Apollonian oracle at Cumae, a Greek colony near Naples, modern Italy. The word sibyl comes (via Latin) from the ancient Greek word sibylla (σίβυλλα), meaning prophetess. There were many sibyls throughout the ancient world. Because of the importance of the Cumaean Sibyl in the legends of early Rome as codified in Virgil's Aeneid VI, and because of her proximity to Rome, the Cumaean Sibyl became the most famous among the Romans.

The Cumaean Sibyl is one of the four sibyls painted by Raphael at Santa Maria della Pace. She was also painted by Andrea del Castagno (Uffizi Gallery), and in the Sistine Chapel ceiling, her powerful presence overshadows every other sibyl – even her younger and more beautiful sisters, such as the Delphic Sibyl.

There are various names for the Cumaean Sibyl besides the "Herophile" of Pausanias and Lactantius or the Aeneid's "Deiphobe, daughter of Glaucus": "Amaltheia", "Demophile" or "Taraxandra" all appear in various references.

== Ancient Roman prophecies ==
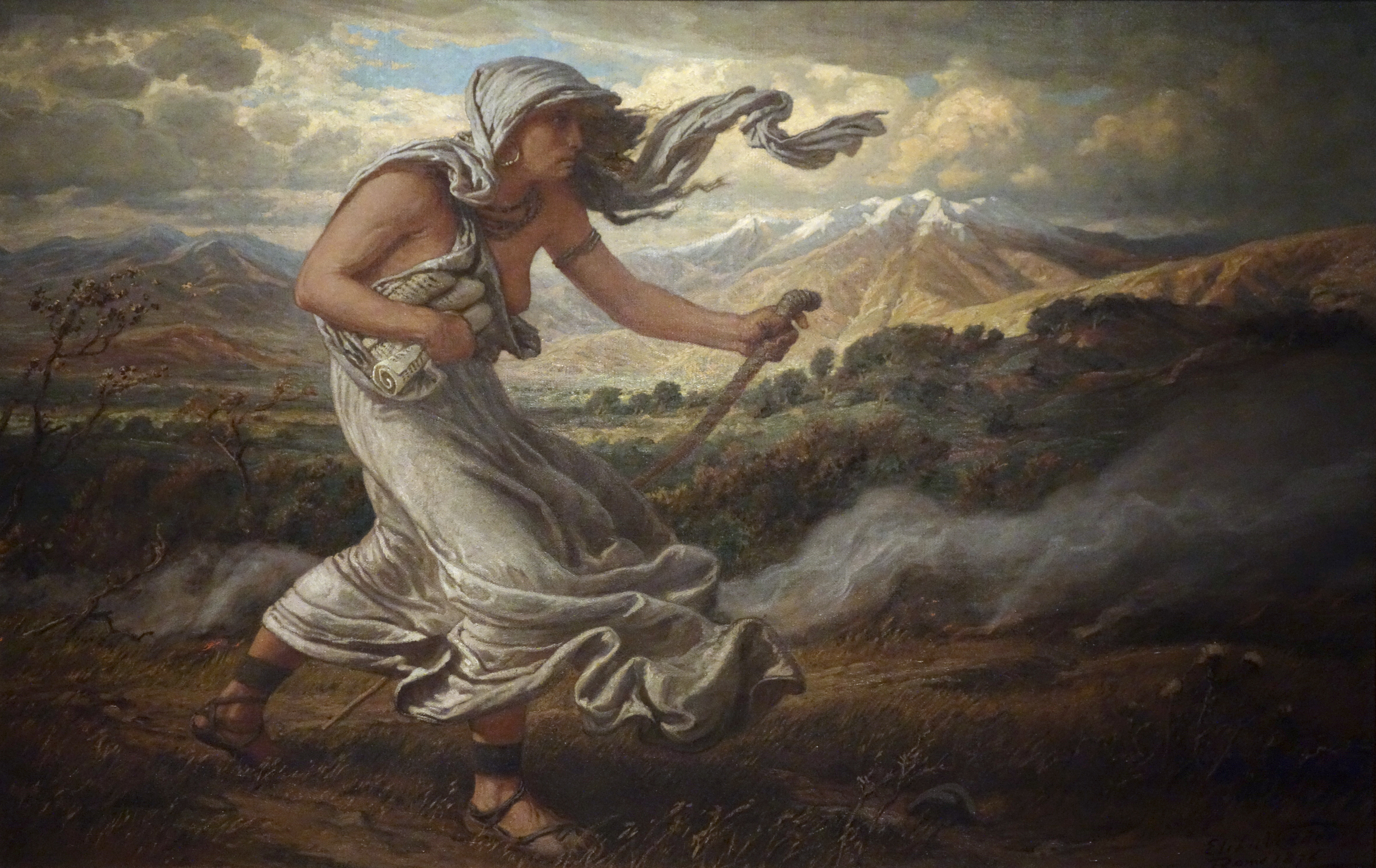
The Cumaean Sibyl by Elihu Vedder (1876)

The story of the acquisition of the Sibylline Books by Lucius Tarquinius Superbus, the semi-legendary last king of the Roman Kingdom, or Tarquinius Priscus, is one of the famous mythic elements of Roman history.

Centuries ago, concurrent with the 50th Olympiad, not long before the expulsion of Rome's kings, an old woman "who was not a native of the country" arrived incognita in Rome. She offered nine books of prophecies to King Tarquin; and as the king declined to purchase them, owing to the exorbitant price she demanded, she burned three and offered the remaining six to Tarquin at the same stiff price, which he again refused, whereupon she burned three more and repeated her offer. Tarquin then relented and purchased the last three at the full original price, whereupon she "disappeared from among men".

The books were thereafter kept in the Temple of Jupiter on the Capitoline Hill, Rome, to be consulted only in emergencies. The temple burned down in the 80s BC, and the books with it, necessitating a re-collection of Sibylline prophecies from all parts of the empire (Tacitus 6.12). These were carefully sorted and those determined to be legitimate were saved in the rebuilt temple. The Emperor Augustus had them moved to the Temple of Apollo on the Palatine Hill, where they remained for most of the remaining Imperial Period.

The Cumaean Sibyl features in the works of various Roman authors, including Virgil (the Eclogues, the Aeneid), Ovid (Book 14 of the Metamorphoses) and Petronius (the Satyricon).

=== Stories recounted in Virgil's Aeneid ===
The Cumaean Sibyl prophesied by "singing the fates" and writing on oak leaves. These were arranged inside the entrance of her cave, but if the wind blew and scattered them, she would not help reassemble the leaves to recreate the original prophecy. (Aeneid 3.441-452)

The Sibyl was a guide to the underworld (Hades), whose entrance lay at the nearby crater of Avernus. Aeneas employed her services before his descent to the lower world to visit his dead father, Anchises, but she warned him that it was no light undertaking:

Trojan, Anchises' son, the descent of Avernus is easy.
All night long, all day, the doors of Hades stand open.
But to retrace the path, to come up to the sweet air of heaven,
That is labour indeed.

— Aeneid 6.126-129.

The Sibyl acts as a bridge between the worlds of the living and the dead (cf. concept of liminality). She shows Aeneas the way to Avernus and teaches him what he needs to know about the dangers of their journey. She also accompanies and guides him through the different areas of the underworld. They leave it together at the end of book 6.

=== Stories recounted in Ovid's Metamorphoses ===
Although she was a mortal, the Sibyl lived about a thousand years. She attained this longevity when Apollo offered to grant her a wish in exchange for her virginity; she took a handful of sand and asked to live for as many years as the grains of sand she held. Later, after she refused the god's love, he allowed her body to wither away because she failed to ask for eternal youth. Her body grew smaller with age and eventually was kept in a jar (ampulla). Eventually only her voice was left (Metamorphoses 14; compare the myth of Tithonus, the lover of Eos, who was also granted immortality but not eternal youth).

=== The Cimmerian Sibyl ===
The Cimmerian Sibyl may have been a doublet for the Cumaean Sibyl, since the designation Cimmerian refers to priestesses who lived underground near Lake Avernus. An oracular shrine dedicated to Apollo, as at Delphi, stood on the Acropolis of Cumae. An underground Roman road ran from the southeastern part of Cumae, through Mount Grillo to the shores of Lake Avernus. However, there are sources that distinguished the two Sibyls, such as those that noted it was the Cumaean and not the Cimmerian Sibyl who offered King Tarquin her book of prophecies.

== Christianity ==
Tacitus proposed that Virgil might have been influenced by the Hebrew Bible, and Constantine the Great interpreted the entirety of the Eclogues as a coded prophecy of the arrival of Christ. In the Oration of Constantine to the Assembly of the Saints, he quoted a passage from the eighth book of the pseudo-Sibylline Oracles, containing an acrostic in which the initials from the lines of a series of prophetic and apocalyptic verses read "Jesus Christ, Son of God, Saviour, Cross".

In the Middle Ages, both the Cumaean Sibyl and Virgil were widely considered prophets of the birth of Christ, especially by Augustine, who quoted the Sibylline Oracles in The City of God. The fourth of Virgil's Eclogues, in which the Sibyl delivers a prophecy, was interpreted as a messianic prophecy of the birth of Christ by early Christians, who deemed Virgil a virtuous pagan; in particular, Dante personified Virgil as his guide through the underworld in the Divine Comedy. Similarly, Michelangelo prominently featured the Cumaean Sibyl in the Sistine Chapel among the Old Testament prophets, as had earlier works such as the Tree of Jesse miniature in the Ingeberg Psalter (c. 1210).

== Literary references ==
- The epigraph to T. S. Eliot's 1922 poem The Waste Land is a quote from the Satyricon of Petronius (48.8) wherein Trimalchio says, "Nam Sibyllam quidem Cumīs ego ipse oculīs meīs vīdī in ampullā pendere, et cum illī puerī dīcerent: Σίβυλλα τί θέλεις; respondēbat illa: ἀποθανεῖν θέλω" ("For I indeed once saw with my own eyes the Sibyl at Cumae hanging in her jar, and when the boys asked her, 'Sibyl, what do you want?', she answered 'I want to die'.")
- Gerard Manley Hopkins's so-called "caudal" (i.e., lengthened) sonnet "Spelt from Sibyl's Leaves" offers a somber prophecy and meditation on life and death.
- The title of Sylvia Plath's semi-autobiographical novel The Bell Jar has been said to be a reference to the ampulla in which the Sibyl lived.
- Robert Graves's 1934 work of historical fiction, I, Claudius, fashions a poetic prophesy by the Sibyl to bind the story together.
- Geoffrey Hill's 1958 poem "After Cumae", in For the Unfallen, also refers to the Sibyl's "mouthy cave".
- Mary Shelley claimed in the introduction to her 1826 novel The Last Man that in 1818 she discovered, in the Sibyl's cave near Naples, a collection of prophetic writings painted on leaves by the Cumaean Sibyl. She claimed she edited these writings into the current first-person narrative of a man living at the end of the 21st century, which in-story proves to be the end of humanity.
- Isaac Asimov wrote that he used an "ancient tale" as inspiration for his 1958 story "All the Troubles of the World". This is almost certainly the same story from Petronius that T. S. Eliot used (see above).
- In Steven Saylor's 1992 historical novel Arms of Nemesis, set on the Bay of Naples in 72 BCE, the painter Iaia of Cyzicus is depicted "moonlighting" as the Sibyl of Cumae.
- David Drake's 1996 story "To Bring the Light" suggests that the Cumaean Sibyl was actually a time traveler: Flavia Herosilla, a well-educated woman from 3rd-century Imperial Rome who was sent back in time by a lightning strike, arriving at the moment of Rome's beginnings around 751 BC. She came to Cumae after ensuring that Remus and Romulus would indeed found Rome. Having arrived from 1,000 years in the future, she was in a position to make accurate prophecies.
- In The Tyrant's Tomb (2019), the Cumaean Sibyl is shown to be selling the Sibylline books to King Tarquin.
- South African artist William Kentridge created an opera, Waiting for the Sibyl, based on the legends of the Cumaean Sibyl. The opera was first performed in Rome at Teatro dell'Opera di Roma in 2019.

== Representations of the Sibyl of Cumae ==
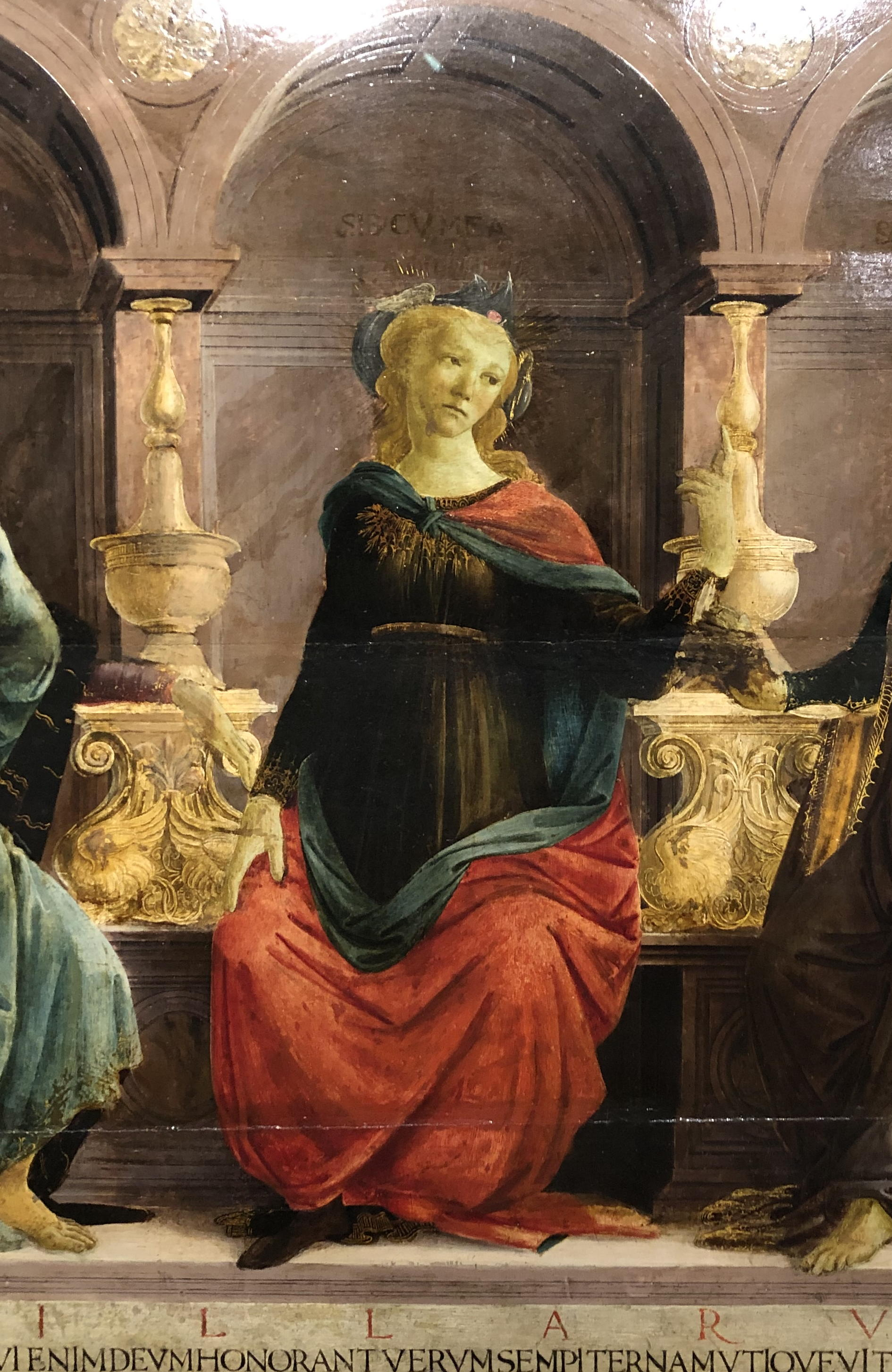
Sandro Botticelli, Christ Church, Oxford

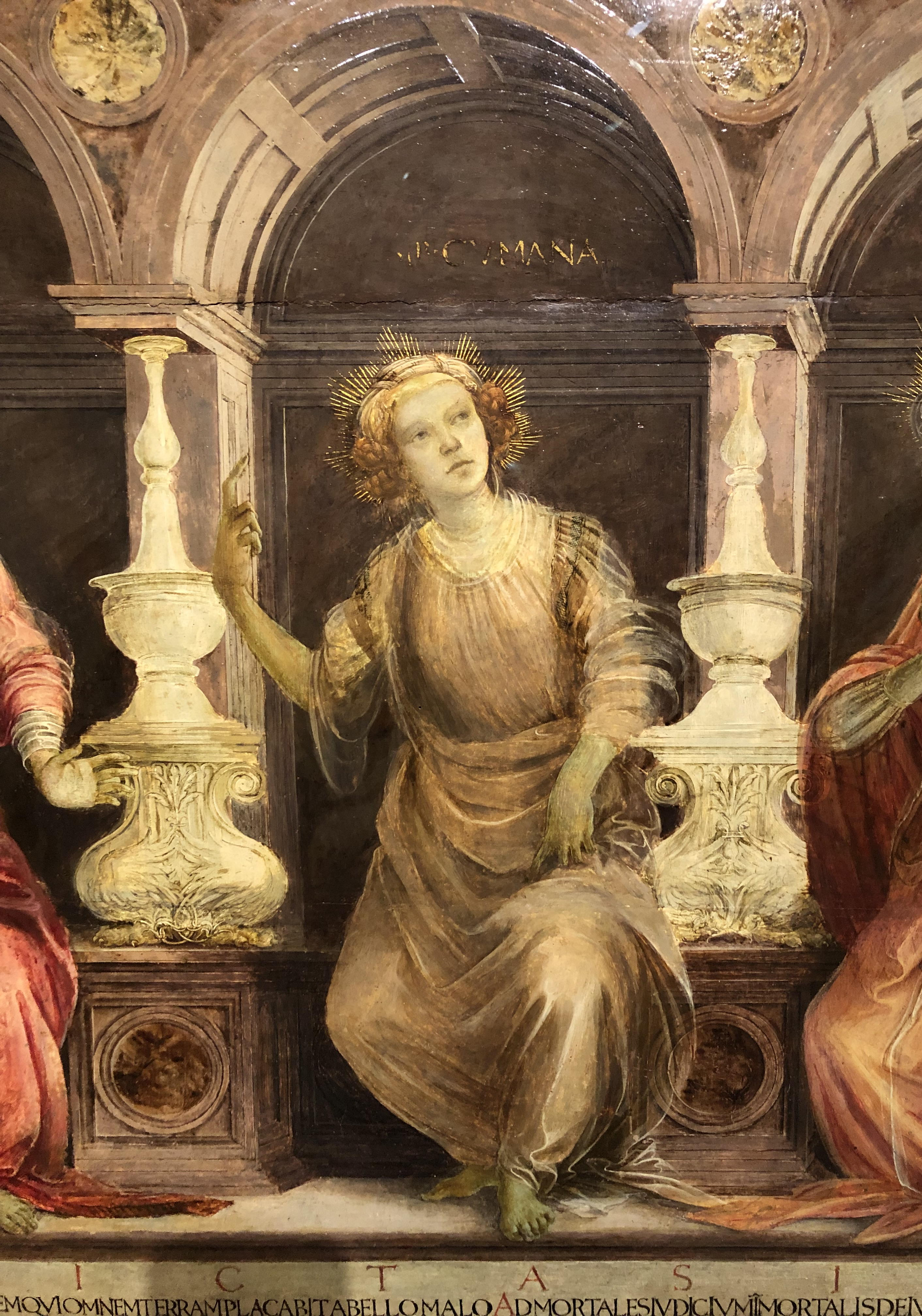
Filippino Lippi, Christ Church, Oxford

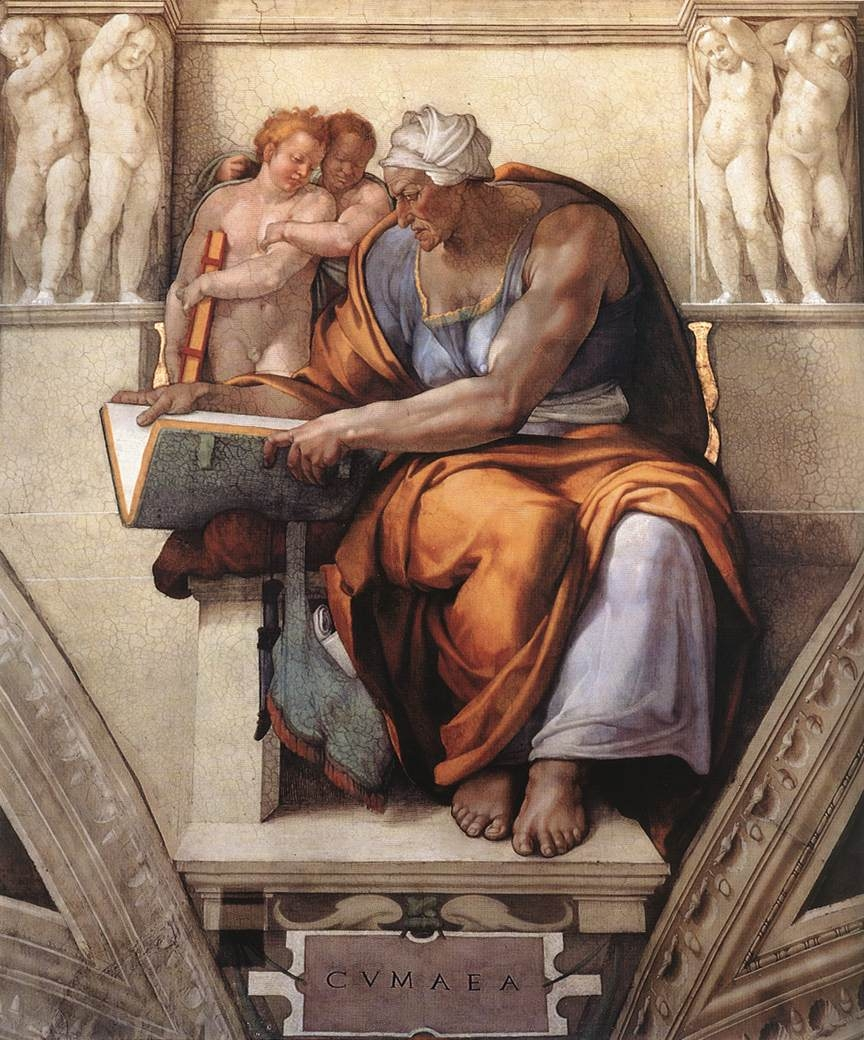
Michelangelo, Sistine Chapel

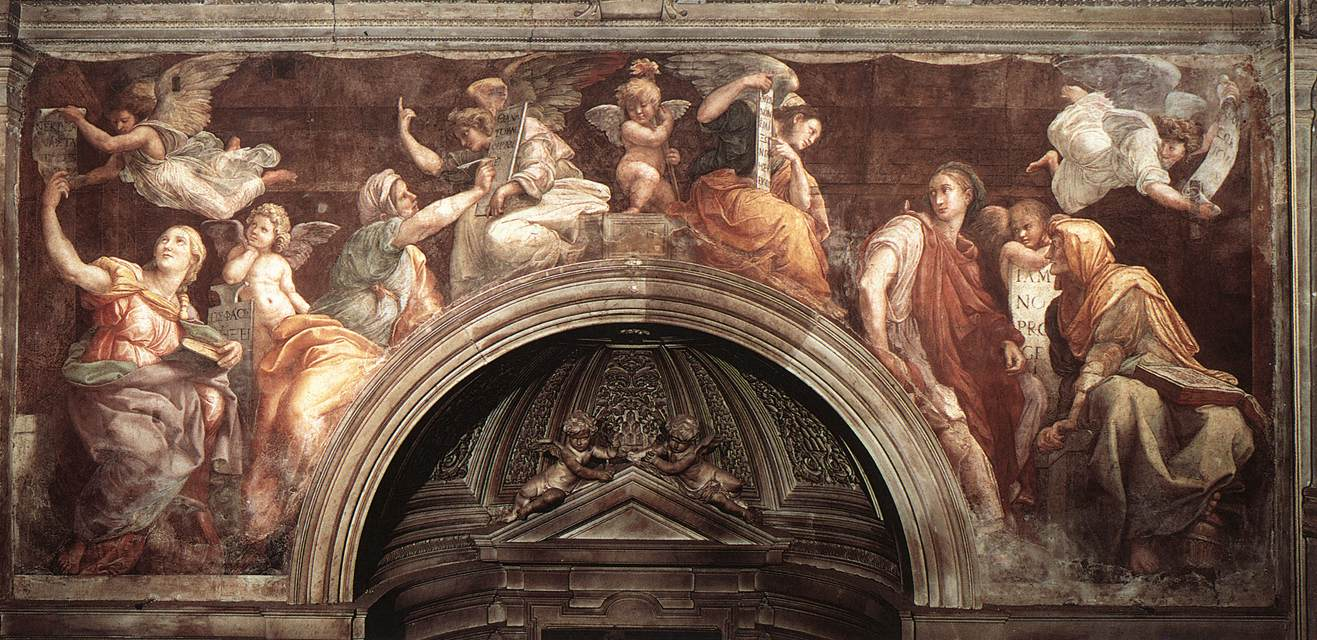
Raphael, Santa Maria della Pace

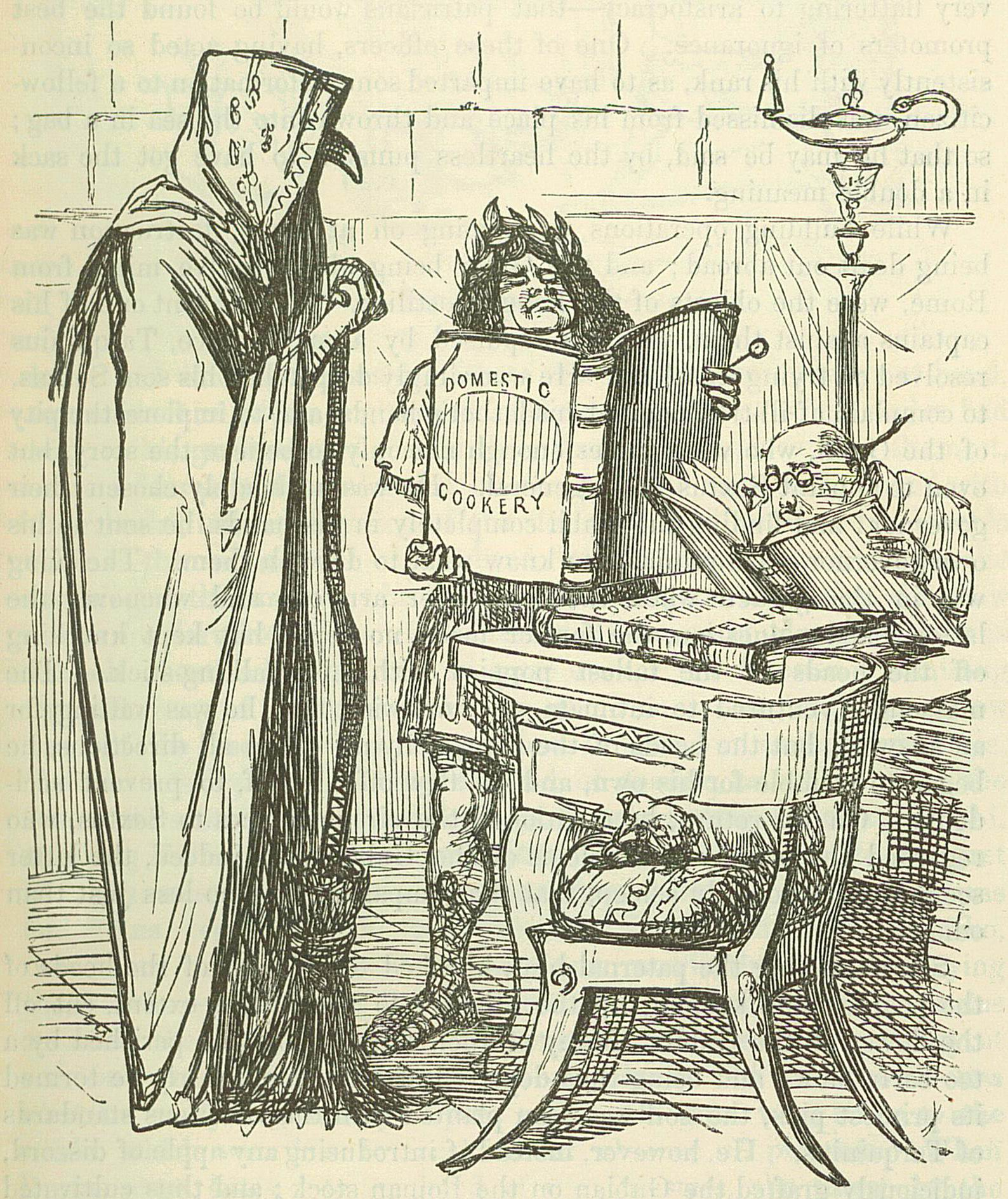
John Leech, from The Comic History of Rome

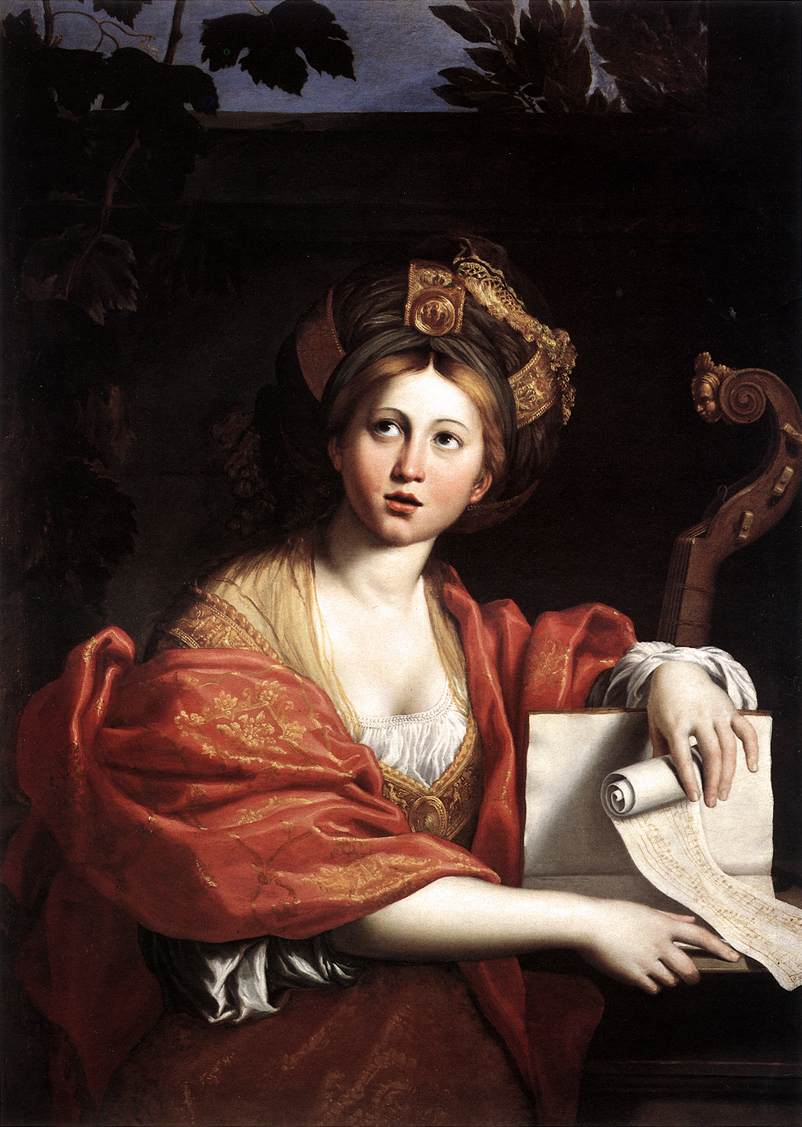
Domenichino, Borghese Gallery

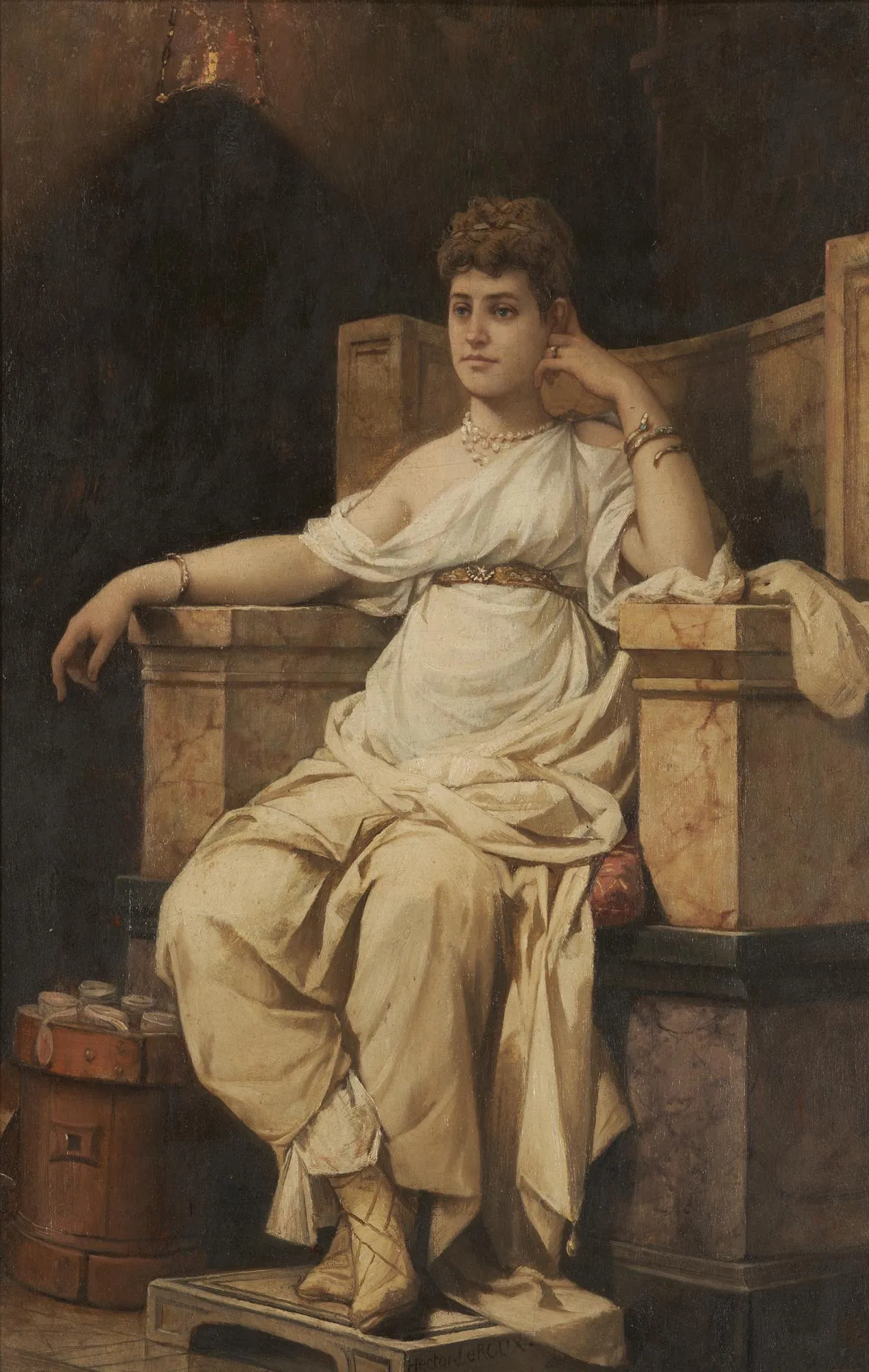
Hector Leroux, private collection.

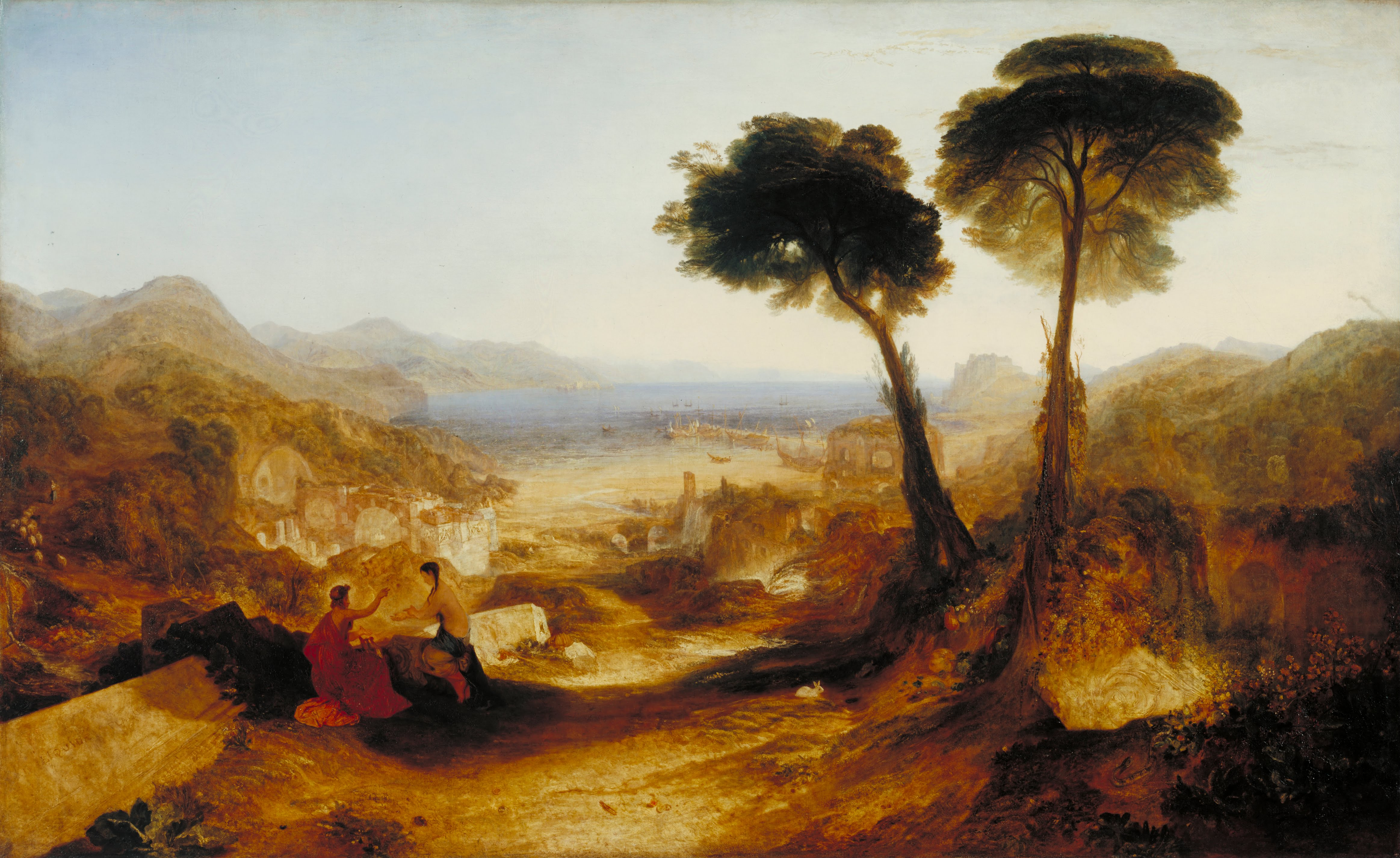
The Bay of Baiae, with Apollo and the Sibyl by Joseph Mallord William Turner, Tate Britain

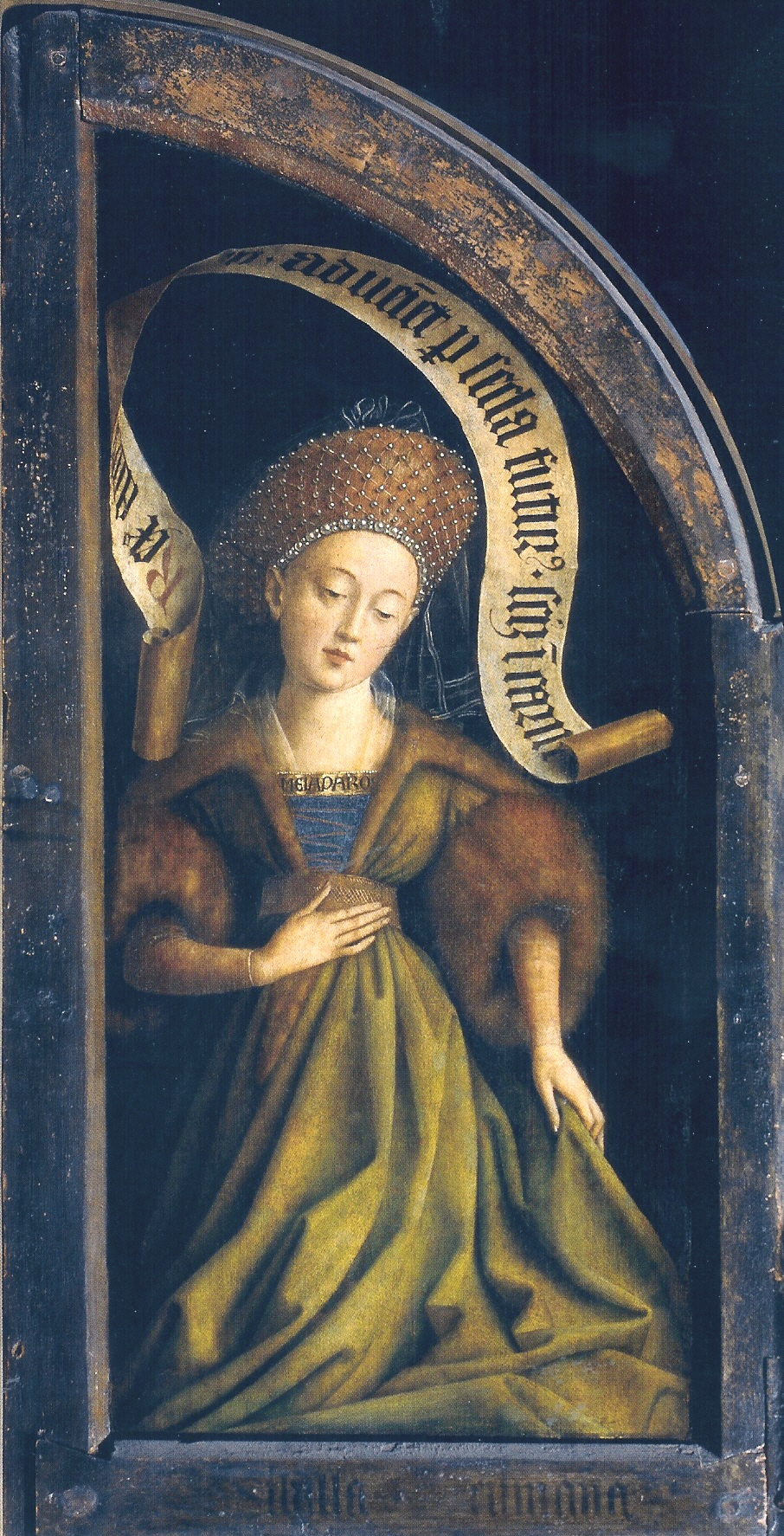
Ghent Altarpiece

== The caves at Cumae and Baiae ==
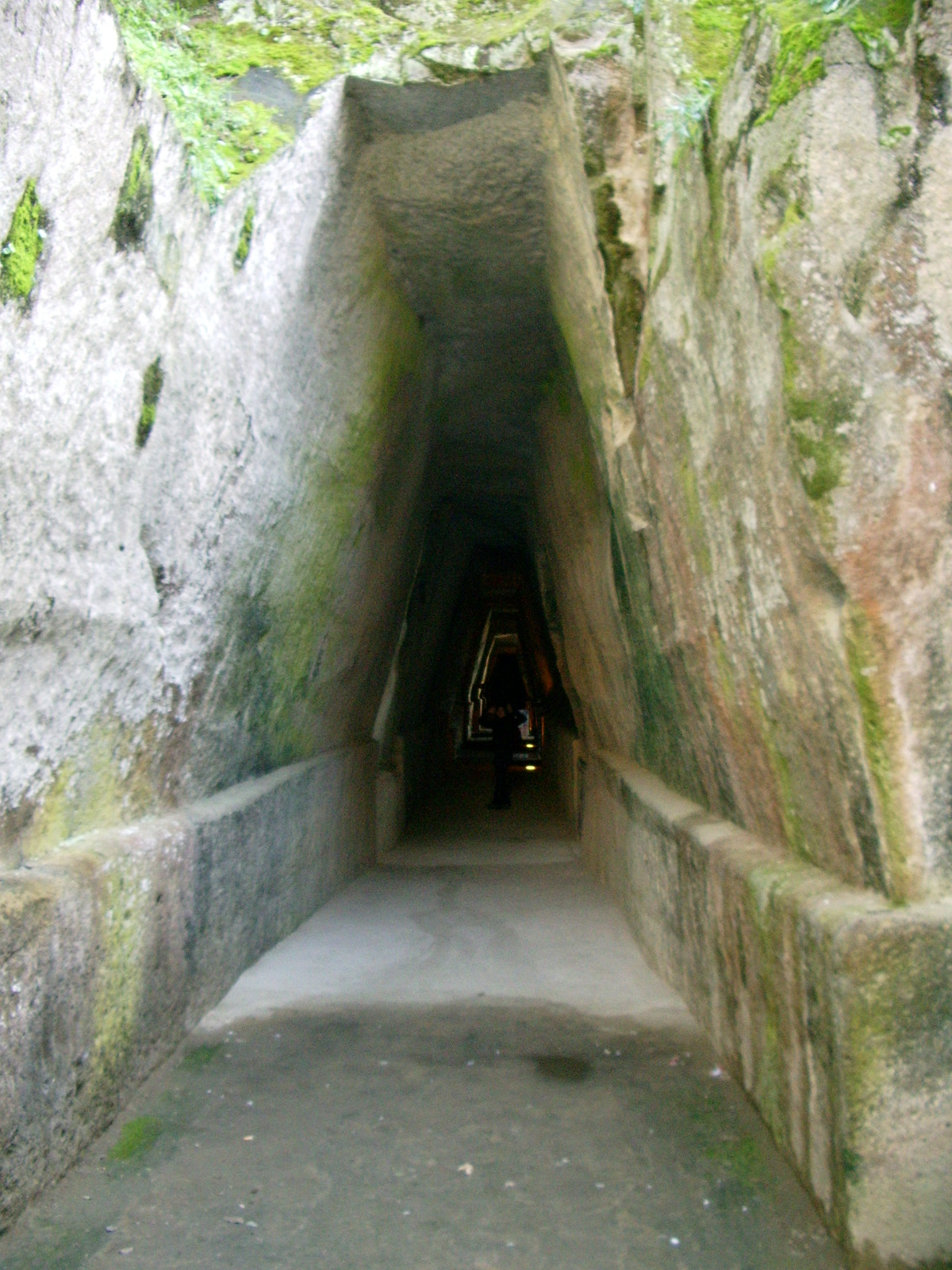
Entrance to the Cave of the Sibyl

The cave known as the "Antro della Sibilla" ("Cave of the Sibilla") was discovered by Amedeo Maiuri in 1932, the identification of which he based on the description by Virgil in the 6th book of the Aeneid, and also on a description by an anonymous author known as pseudo-Justin. (Virg. Aen. 6. 45–99; Ps-Justin, 37.) The identification of the cave as the site of a historical Sibyl is problematic: it is indeed possible that pseudo-Justin (and the other periegetic authors Maiuri cites: e.g. Ioannes Lydus, the Byzantine historian Agathias) are themselves influenced by Virgil's description rather than an extant local prophetic tradition. The cave is a trapezoidal passage over 131 m long, running parallel to the side of the hill and cut out of the volcanic tuff stone, and leads to an innermost chamber where the Sibyl was thought to have prophesied.

A nearby tunnel through the acropolis now known as the "Crypta Romana" (part of Agrippa and Octavian's defenses in the war against Sextus Pompey) was previously identified as the Grotto of the Sibyl. The inner chamber was later used as a burial chamber during the 4th or 5th century AD (M. Napoli 1965, 105) by people living at the site.

Some archaeologists have proposed an alternative cave site as the home of the Sibyl. A tunnel complex near Baiae (part of the volcanically active Phlegraean fields) leads to an underground, geothermally heated stream that could be presented to visitors as the river Styx. The layout of the tunnels conforms to the description in the Aeneid of Aeneas's journey to the underworld and back.

== Primary sources ==
- Virgil, Aeneid vi.268 ff
- Isidore, Etymologiae viii.8.5
- Servius, In Aeneida vi.72, 321
- Lactantius, Divinae institutiones i.6.10–11
- Solinus, Collectanea rerum memorabilium ii.16, 17, 18

== See also ==
- Sebile
- The Golden Bough (mythology)
- Dido (Queen of Carthage)
- Obscuris vera involvens

== Bibliography ==
- Henry Gardiner Adams, ed. (1857). "Amalthæa". A Cyclopaedia of Female Biography: 35. Wikidata Q115651631.
