= British Constantine =

Flattering conceit applied to both Elizabeth I and James I of England

The "British Constantine" was a flattering geopolitical remark ("conceit") about the historical comparison to the Roman Catholic Church of the Byzantine Empire applied to both Elizabeth I and James I of England, implying a comparison with the Roman Emperor Constantine the Great. It had both secular and religious implications, Constantine having unified the Roman Empire of his time, and made Christianity a state religion.

Constantine was associated also, through the work Oratio ad sanctorum coetum ("Oration of Constantine" or "sermon of Constantine"), with the Christian reading of the fourth Eclogue of Virgil. Here a Sybilline oracle is invoked as a supposed source of Virgil. The Christian interpretation is Messianic, an idea grafted onto Virgil's original praise of a coming Golden Age of empire.

== Background ==
Constantine III of Britain (6th century) was one of the legendary kings of Britain, having a slender historical basis; Constantine I of Scotland (5th century) was a mythical figure from the king-list of George Buchanan. Constantine I of the Picts (9th century) was a real historical figure. The main historical reference of the "British Constantine", however, from the 12th century to the 18th century, was the Roman Emperor Constantine I. This was the period in which the legend that Constantine was a British native was taken seriously, and had significance for politics. It was bound up with completely unattested stories about the British origin of his mother, Helena of Constantinople, important in Christian tradition. While Constantine was at York in 306 with his father Constantius Chlorus, and was declared Augustus on his father's death in that year, there is no historical evidence to connect Helena with Britain.

== Traditions ==
The chroniclers William of Malmesbury and Henry of Huntingdon mention the "British Constantine" myth as factual, the former being presumed to have priority by a few years (by 1125), the latter making King Coel of Colchester Constantine's maternal grandfather in his Historia Anglorum. A few years later Geoffrey of Monmouth embroidered the tale, making Coel father of Helena rebel against King Asclepiodotus in his Historia regum Britanniae, and Constantine an ancestor of King Arthur. In this form Constantine was a supporting figure in the "British myth" (see list of legendary kings of Britain). Ralph de Diceto adhered to the classical history of Constantine's origins, to be found in Eutropius, but otherwise English historians accepted Geoffrey's account; and Helena's British origins were alluded to in the Golden Legend.

Ralph Higden in his Polychronicon emphasized the Christian role of Constantine. The 15th-century chronicle of Adam Usk asserted that the Greeks of his time considered that they descended from a "British Constantine". John Capgrave and John Lydgate lauded Constantine. In international relations, the British Constantine was deployed at the Council of Constance to argue assertively for separate English representation, as distinct from the "German nation" in which it had been traditionally included.

== Henry VIII, Arthur and Constantine ==
The early Tudor concern with traditional history was Arthurian, as evidenced by the name chosen for Arthur, Prince of Wales. Henry VIII made a conscious political decision of 1533 to identify instead with the Constantine figure. The Constantine connection with the Tudors had been laid out by John Rous, in work taken up by Robert Fabyan and then John Rastell. As a consequence Polydore Vergil was allowed to publish his Historia Anglicana in 1534, a work dismissive of the Arthurian matter, but supporting the British origins of Helena. He also imported a tradition linking Claudius Gothicus with the Constantinian dynasty, significant for Tudor hereditary claims.

== Elizabeth compared with Constantine ==
The casting of Elizabeth I as a "British Constantine" (rather than English) depended on foreign policy towards Scotland, and therefore was problematic. John Foxe in dedicating his Actes and Monuments to Elizabeth compared her to Constantine, and a woodcut from the 1563 edition portrayed her as a "second Constantine".

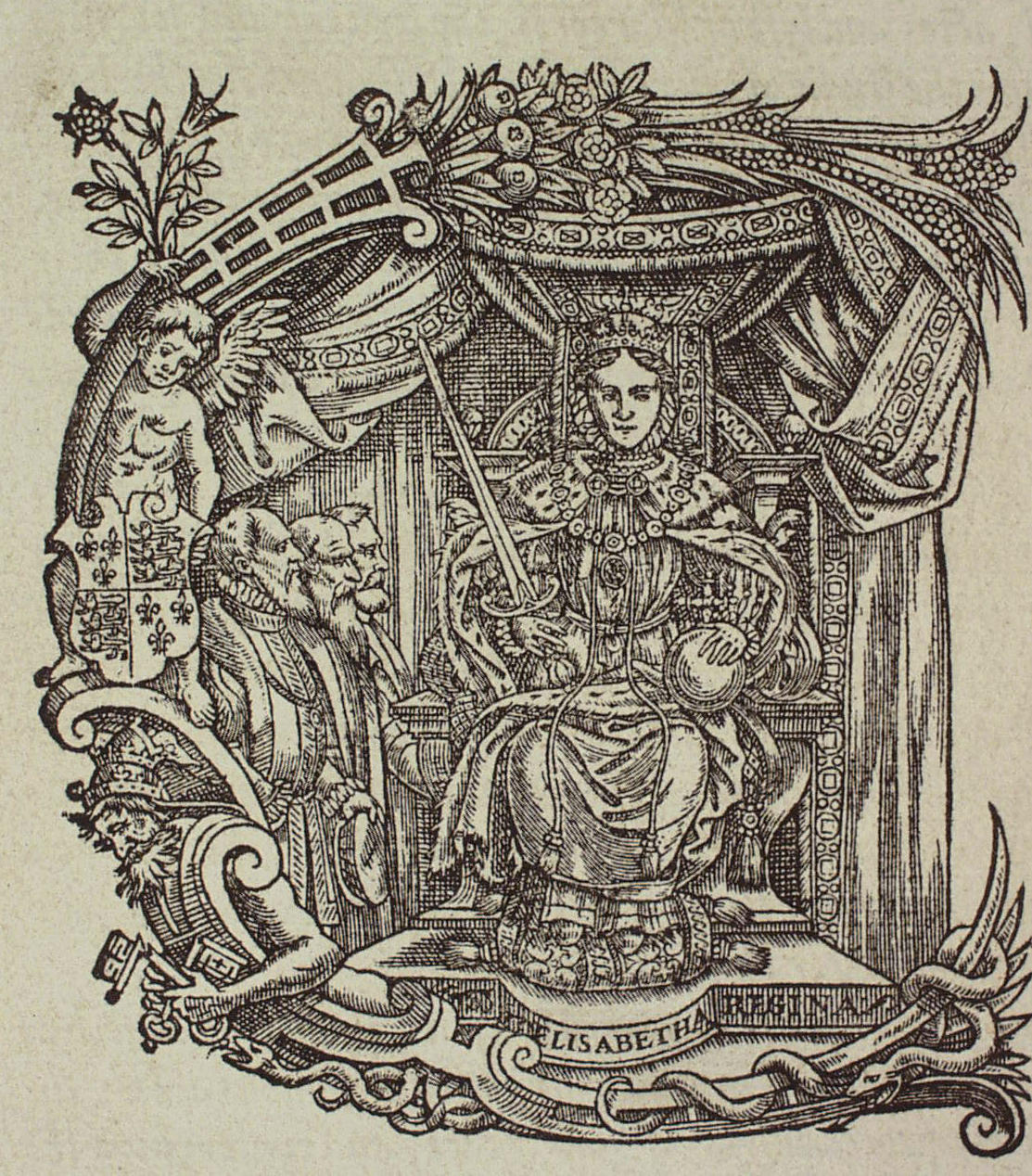
Elizabeth I as Constantine, from John Foxe's Actes and Monuments

== James compared with Constantine ==
James I in a medal struck for his 1603 accession to the English throne claimed by means of the Latin inscription to be "emperor of the whole island of Britain". Because of English parliamentary resistance to such a title, James backed away from further assertions of imperium; but comparisons persisted to Roman emperors, Emperor Augustus as well as Constantine. Ten years later, Joseph Hall preached for the anniversary to the king and elaborated the Constantine parallel.

John Gordon preached on Constantine's British birth: it was still widely believed that his mother Helena was a Briton. William Symonds picked up on the legendary descent of the House of Stuart from Constantine. James Maxwell projected a genealogical work that would demonstrate the descent of the heir apparent Prince Charles from 49 emperors, hinting at a role as Last World Emperor. This implication contrasts with Foxe on Elizabeth, who did not imply a role for her as Last Emperor. Maxwell and Sir William Alexander promoted ideas of a British restoration of Constantine's eastern empire.

Constantine was associated with the holding of the First Council of Nicaea in 325. Since James was following a conciliarist strategy to reunite Christendom, the comparison was flattering to him. It also, however, could attract criticism from the Puritan flank. Richard Stock, for example, contrasted Biblical inerrancy with the possibility of doubting the outcomes of councils.

== Later developments ==
=== Religious critique ===
Some Protestants took a less favourable view of Constantine, as the 17th century proceeded. By the time of John Milton's first publication Of Reformation of 1641, the orthodox Church of England attitude to Constantine, of John Jewell and Foxe, had parted company with radical Protestants, who took his reign to be the beginning of the "apostasy" of the Christian church. In parallel, Thomas Brightman began a process of decoupling "imperial" and "apocalyptic" themes of the end times.

Patrick Forbes considered that Constantine bore responsibility for bishops becoming ambitious. In fact there was ambivalence about the historical figure of Constantine, because his appeal in religious terms was to Erastianism (for example to John Foxe); while Puritans preferred to keep the state out of the church, and also might distance themselves from Rome in any form.

=== Later usage ===
Inigo Jones planned at Temple Bar a structure based on the Arch of Constantine, with an equestrian statue of Charles I on top. It was, however, never built.

Henry Stubbe as a courtier used the comparison of Charles II of England with Constantine. Pierre Jurieu invoked the title for William III of England. John Whittel in 1693 used the title Constantinus redivivus for his book on William's military successes.
