= Obscuris vera involvens =

Phrase meaning "Truth is enveloped by obscurity" from Virgil's Aeneid

The phrase (Latin: obscuris vera involvens "wrapping truth in mystery") is from Virgil's Aeneid (VI, 100).

Talibus ex adyto dictis Cumaea Sibylla
horrendas canit ambages antroque remugit,
obscuris vera involvens: ea frena furenti
concutit, et stimulos sub pectore vertit Apollo.

In these words the Cumaean Sibyl chants from the shrine her dread enigmas and booms from the cavern, wrapping truth in darkness—so does Apollo shake the reins as she rages, and ply the goad beneath her breast.

— Virgil, Aeneid 6.98–101

The quote was described in David Evans Macdonnel's Dictionary of Quotations (1799) as being "frequently used to reprobate a style which is at once pompous and ambiguous". The Routledge Dictionary of Latin Quotations (2005) defines it as meaning "concealing the truth in obscurity" or "shrouding the truth in darkness", and notes it is "said of political figures". Eugene Ehrlich said the phrase defined "the uncommon word 'obfuscation', a common technique practiced by uncommonly clever people intent on confusing voters, listeners, or readers".

It is also found on an engraving on the title page of Francis Bacon's Wisdom of the Ancients (1641 French edition).

== See also ==
- Obscurantism
