= William Simonds =

William Simonds may refer to:

- William Simonds (author) (1822–1859), American author
- William E. Simonds (1842–1903), United States Representative and Medal of Honor recipient
- William Blackall Simonds (1761–1834), English brewer and banker
- William Barrow Simonds (1820–1911), English politician, MP for Winchester
- William Simonds (politician), MP for Windsor

== See also ==
- William Symonds (disambiguation)
