= William Symonds (priest) =

William Symonds D.D. (1556 – c. 1616) was an English clergyman, known as a promoter of the Colony of Virginia. The arguments of Symonds in favour of the colony in 1609, equating the British nation with the biblical Abraham, and stating that Native Americans lacked property rights, have been seen as presaging later developments in the colonisation of North America.

== Life ==
Born in Hampshire, Symonds matriculated at Oxford on 3 March 1573, and was elected a demy of Magdalen College in 1573, then described as from Oxfordshire. He graduated B.A. on 1 February 1578, was elected a probationer-fellow of Magdalen in 1578, and graduated M.A. on 5 April 1581.

In 1583 Symonds was appointed by the President Laurence Humfrey to the mastership of Magdalen College School, where he was in post to 1586. During that time complaints were made against him for non-residence. In 1583 he became rector of Langton-by-Partney, Lincolnshire; in 1584 he was presented by the Queen to the rectory of Bourton-on-the-Water, Gloucestershire; on 14 November 1587 he was admitted to the rectory of Stock, Essex, by John Aylmer, the bishop of London. In 1594 Symonds obtained the rectory of Theddlethorpe, Lincolnshire; in 1597 he was instituted to the rectory of Well, Lincolnshire; and in 1599 he was presented by Robert Bertie, to the rectory of Halton Holgate, Lincolnshire.

Symonds was also for several years preacher at St Saviour's Church, Southwark. He was presented to the rectory of Wyberton, Lincolnshire, in 1612. According to Anthony Wood, he was created D.D. in 1613. He lived until 1616.

== Works ==
Symond's works were:

- Pisgah Evangelica, according to the Method of the Revelation, presenting the History of the Church, and those Canaanites over whom she shall triumph, London, 1605. A commentary on the Book of Revelation, it terminates its history at the Union of the Crowns in 1603. The work announces a "first resurrection" as imminent.
- A Heavenly Voyce. A Sermon tending to call the people of God from among the Romish Babylonians; preached at Paules Crosse, the 12 of Ianuarie 1606, London, 1606.

Virginia (1609) was the first sermon preached before the Virginia Company. The text was Genesis 12:1–3, God's promise to Abram on his emigration. Related sermons of the time were those by John Donne, which put forward similar religious arguments, and William Crashaw. Symonds invoked the British Constantine as a model for James VI and I, a pacifier and propagator of the Christian gospel. Alluding to the Book of Numbers, he implied that Virginia should be taken as Promised Land. The sermon has been seen as picking up from the endpoint of Pisgah Evangelica.

From some Observations by Symonds, printed in Captain John Smith's General History of Virginia, 1624, it was thought at one time that he had been resident in the Virginia colony; but that is now not thought to be supported by the evidence. He did look over Smith's manuscripts, and helped him in having them published at Oxford (against the wishes of the company). Symonds has been identified as a ghost-writer of the General History.

== Notes ==
Attribution

This article incorporates text from a publication now in the public domain: Lee, Sidney, ed. (1898). "Symonds, William (1556-1616?)". Dictionary of National Biography. Vol. 55. London: Smith, Elder & Co.
