= Sabine G. MacCormack =

German-American historian

Sabine MacCormack
- Born: February 24, 1941; Frankfurt, Germany
- Died: June 16, 2012 (aged 71)
- Education: Goethe University of Frankfurt; University of Oxford; University of Liverpool
- Awards: Guggenheim fellow

Sabine MacCormack (1941–2012) was a German-American historian of Late Antiquity and Colonial Latin America.

== Life ==
Born Sabine Oswalt in Frankfurt, Germany, in 1941, she grew up seeing the turmoil and violence of World War II. After receiving her Abitur from a Classical Gymnasium, she studied Classical Philology and History at the Goethe University Frankfurt from 1960-1961, but then switched to studying Modern History at the University of Oxford. After graduating from Oxford with her B.A. in 1964, she earned a diploma in archives from the University of Liverpool in 1965 and then worked as a Teaching Fellow in Classics and Legal History at the University of Sydney until 1967. After working at Collins and Sons Publishers for a time, she returned to the University of Oxford to undertake doctoral study in late antiquity at the University of Oxford. She earned her D. Phil. at Oxford in 1974 with a doctoral dissertation on late antique art and panegyric, under the direction of Peter Robert Lamont Brown. After graduation, she worked in the publishing field at Phaedon Press until 1979 (during which time she translated several scholarly works), but then was offered a tenure-track assistant professor position at the University of Texas at Austin in 1980. In 1982 she moved to Stanford University to take up a joint position in the Departments of Classics and History. She then accepted a position as the Alice Freeman Palmer Professor of History and Professor of Classics at the University of Michigan in 1990 and then the position of Mary Ann and Charles R. Walgreen Professor for the Study of Human Understanding at the University of Michigan in 1997. In 2003 she accepted the position of Reverend Theodore Hesburgh Professor of Arts and Letters at the University of Notre Dame.

While her scholarship continues to have a great impact, she was also an instructor at both the graduate and undergraduate levels, inspiring many of her students to pursue Late Antiquity as a field of study. A woman of firm opinions, she enjoyed inviting students and colleagues to long salon style evenings at her home to discuss scholarship and politics (whether at Stanford, Ann Arbor, or South Bend).

In addition to her scholarship and teaching, MacCormack was an artist (working in sketching and watercolors).

MacCormack died while gardening at her home on June 16, 2012.

== Scholarly work ==
MacCormack was a prolific scholar. She already published a Concise Encyclopedia of Greek and Roman Mythology (Glasgow: William Collins and Sons) under her maiden name Oswalt in 1969. She revised her doctoral dissertation which she published as Art and Ceremony in Late Antiquity (Berkeley and Los Angeles: The University of California Press) in 1981. She then shifted to Colonial Latin American History and published Religion in the Andes: Vision and Imagination in Early Colonial Peru (Princeton: Princeton University Press ) in 1991. She returned to the field of Late Antiquity with her book The Shadows of Poetry: Vergil in the Mind of Augustine (Berkeley and Los Angeles: the University of California Press) in 1998. She then published On the Wings of Time: Rome, the Incas, Spain, and Peru (Princeton: Princeton University Press) in 2007. She was working on at least two books at the time of her death, and also published over 60 articles in scholarly journals and edited volumes.

== Awards ==
In addition to the endowed chairs listed above, MacCormack won many major awards for her scholarship. Her book On the Wings of Time earned the James A. Rawley Prize in Atlantic History as well as the John Edwin Fagg Prize for Spanish, Portuguese, and Latin American History from the American Historical Association. She was awarded fellowships at Dumbarton Oaks in Byzantine History and Pre-Columbian Studies, in 1977 and 1987 respectively. In 1997, she was elected to the American Philosophical Society. She was granted a Guggenheim Fellowship in 1999, and was elected a Fellow of the Medieval Academy of America in 2000. MacCormack also earned the Distinguished Achievement Award of the Andrew W. Mellon Foundation's in 2001. She was also elected to the American Academy of Arts and Sciences in 2007.

== Selected publications ==
- Sabine Oswalt, Concise Encyclopedia of Greek and Roman Mythology (Glasgow: William Collins and Sons, 1969)
- Sabine MacCormack, Art and Ceremony in Late Antiquity (Berkeley and Los Angeles: The University of California Press, 1981)
- Sabine MacCormack, Religion in the Andes: Vision and Imagination in Early Colonial Peru (Princeton: Princeton University Press, 1991).
- Sabine MacCormack, The Shadows of Poetry: Vergil in the Mind of Augustine (Berkeley and Los Angeles: the University of California Press, 1998).
- Sabine MacCormack, On the Wings of Time: Rome, the Incas, Spain, and Peru (Princeton: Princeton University Press, 2007).
- EL Legado de Sabine MacCormack, Victor Maqque: https://dialnet.unirioja.es/servlet/articulo?codigo=7576225
