= Periegesis =

Ancient description of an area or territory

A periegesis (Ancient Greek περιήγησις 'leading around') is a geographical survey or travelogue, sometimes also called a periodos or ' journey around' [sc. the world].

It is the name of several books:

- Description of Greece (Ἑλλάδος περιήγησις, Hellados Periegesis), in prose, by Pausanias
- Dionysius Periegetes of Alexandria's Οικουμένης περιήγησης Periegesis of the World, in hexameter, usually translated Survey of the World
  - Avienius's Latin translation of Dionysius Periegetes
  - Priscian's Latin translation of Dionysius Periegesis Prisciani, in hexameter
- Pseudo-Scymnus's Scymni Chii Periegesis, correctly called Περίοδος του Νικομήδη
- Mnaseas of Patras's Periegesis or Periplus

== See also ==
- Periplus, an itinerary of ports and coastal landmarks
- Periodos ges of Hecataeus of Miletus
