= Eclogue 3 =

Poem by Virgil

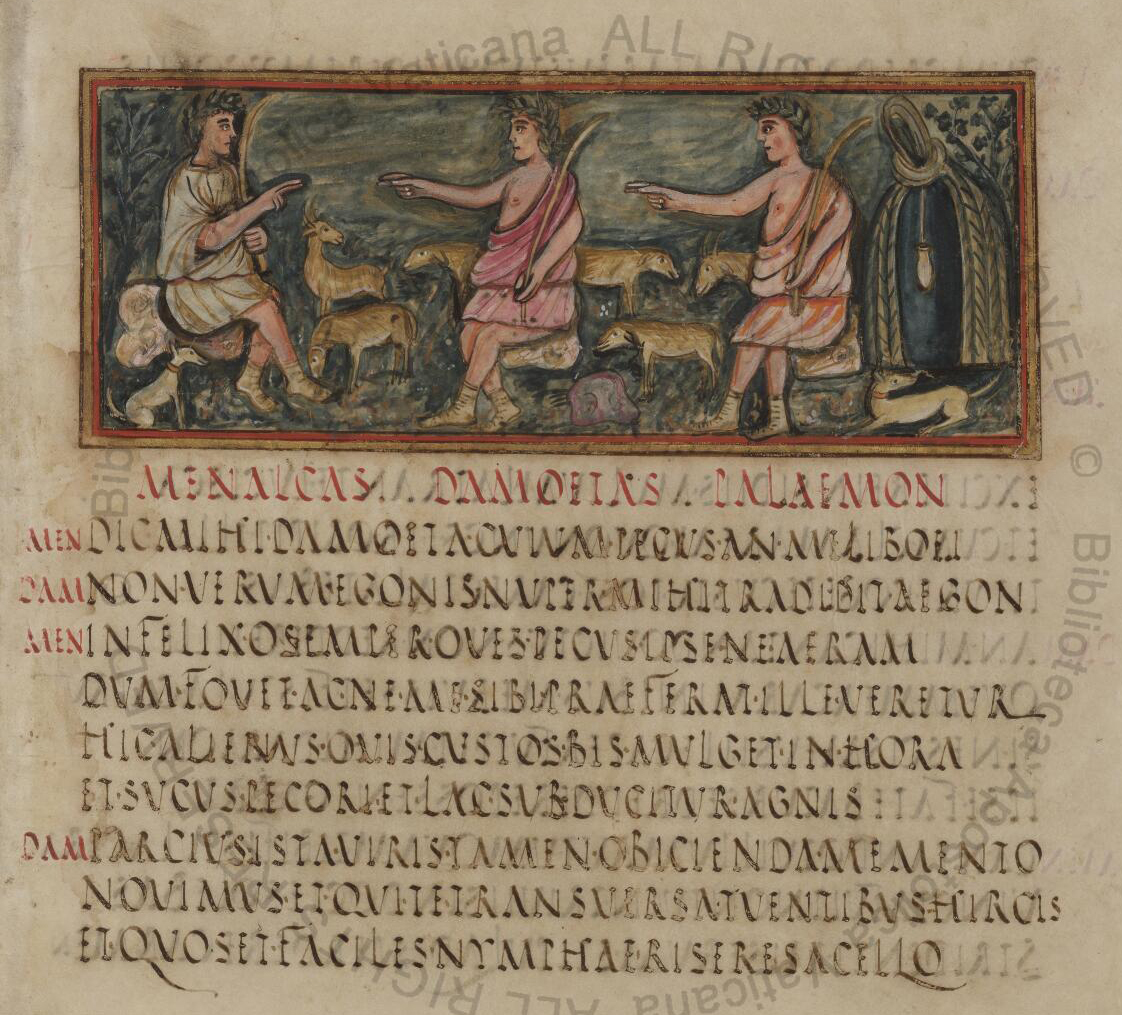
Vergilius Romanus, fol. 16 r.

Eclogue 3 (Ecloga III; Bucolica III) is a pastoral poem by the Latin poet Virgil, one of a collection of ten poems known as the Eclogues. This eclogue represents the rivalry in song of two herdsmen, Menalcas and Damoetas. After trading insults, the two men decide to have a singing competition, for which each offers a prize (Damoetas a female calf and Menalcas a pair of ornamented cups). A neighbour, Palaemon, who comes along by chance, agrees to be the judge. The second half of the poem consists of the contest, in which each of the two competitors in turn sings a couplet and the other caps it with another couplet (each singing 12 couplets in all). In the end Palaemon brings the contest to an end and declares it a draw.

The poem is based mainly on the bucolic Idyll 5 of the 3rd century BC Greek poet Theocritus, but with elements added from Idyll 4 and other Theocritean idylls. Like Theocritus's Idylls 4 and 5, and all of Virgil's surviving poetry, Eclogue 3 is composed in dactylic hexameters.

Eclogues 2 and 3 are thought to be the earliest of Virgil's Eclogues to be written, and date to about 42 BC.

== Amoebaean song ==
Such poetry as verses 60–107 is called amoebaean (or amoebean) (ἀμοιβαία ἀοιδά) from ἀμοιβή ('interchange'), and Virgil calls it 'alternate song' (alterna). The rule was that the second singer should answer the first in an equal number of verses, on the same or a similar subject, and also if possible show superior force or power of expression.

The Eclogue is largely copied from the fourth and fifth Idylls of Theocritus, but this form of poetry was probably extremely popular in Italy, where improvised rude songs were always a characteristic of village festivities. The Romans were very fond of coarse invective and repartee, and these form the staple of the Satura (one of the earliest forms of Latin drama), the Fescennine and Atellane farces, and the Mimes. J. B. Greenough notes, "Though the Amœbæan verse is Greek, and the poem itself copied from Theocritus, yet the alternate abuse is thoroughly Italian."

B. B. Powell writes: "An amoebean contest ... is not a game for amateurs. Moving swiftly, it is merciless to the unclever. According to its rules the leader (Damoetas) needs to dazzle and bewilder his opponent through versatile handling of conventional literary forms and through sudden shifts in subject or theme. The respondent (Menalcas) must match the leader's convention but, in some way, turn its content around."

== Summary ==
=== Introduction ===
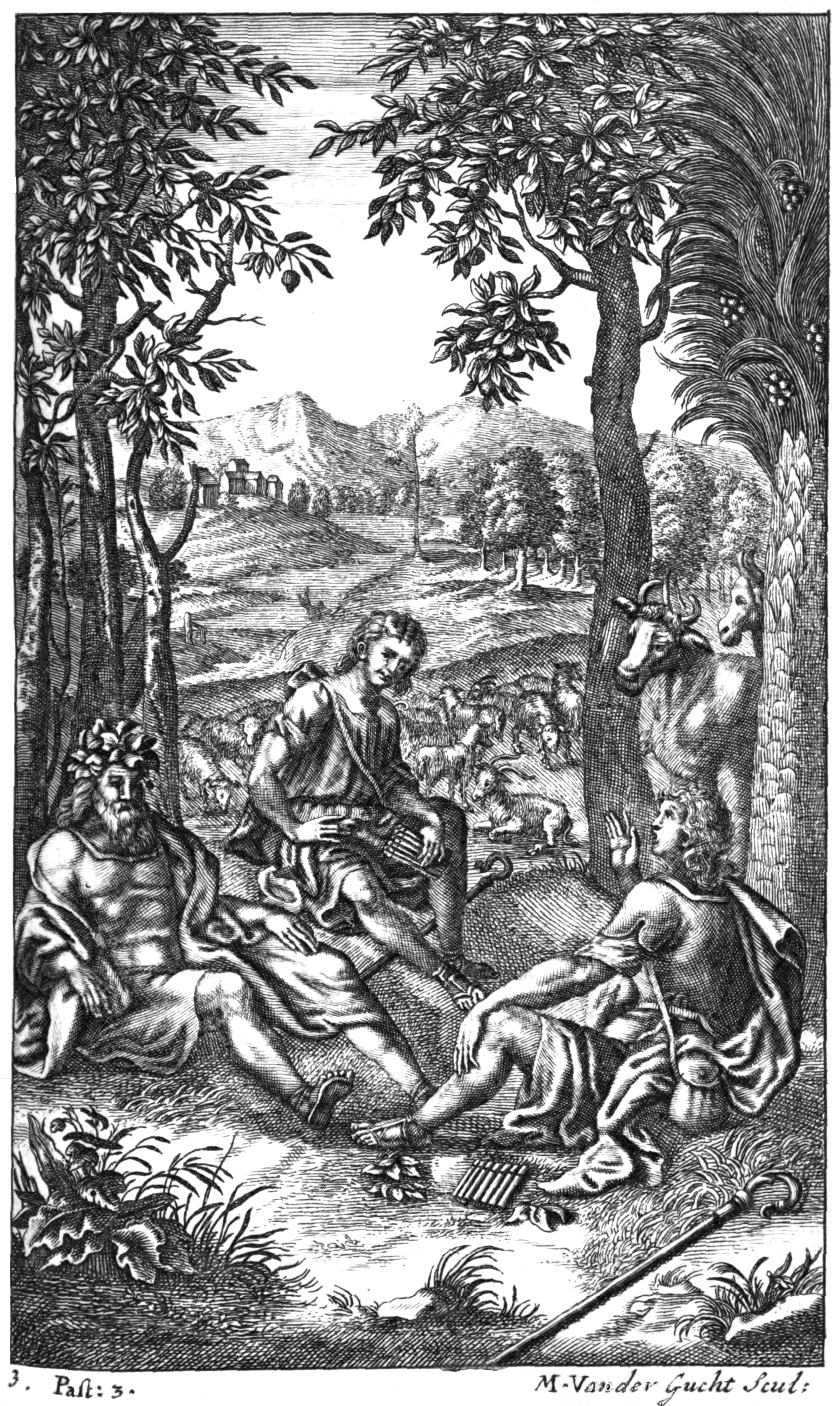
Engraving for Dryden's Virgil, 1709: "Ho, Groom, what Shepherd [sic] owns those ragged Sheep?" (1)

- 1 Menalcas, meeting the herdsman Damoetas, asks him whose flock of sheep he is looking after; on learning that it is Aegon's, Menalcas says he pities Aegon since Damoetas steals the milk which should go to the lambs. Damoetas warns him not to say such things to real men: "We all know who did what to you in the sacred place of the nymphs while the goats were looking the other way!"

- 10 Undeterred, Menalcas accuses Damoetas of trimming Mico's vines badly. Damoetas responds with a reminder of how Menalcas had broken Daphnis's bow and panpipes in a fit of jealousy over a boy. Menalcas replies by saying that he had witnessed Damoetas trying to steal a goat belonging to Damon. Damoetas protests that the goat was rightly his, won in a singing competition; upon which Menalcas pours scorn on Damoetas's ability at singing.

=== Bargaining over the prizes ===
- 28 At this point Damoetas challenges Menalcas to a singing competition, proposing that he will put up a female calf as a prize. Menalcas responds that he dare not offer a calf, since his father and strict stepmother count the herd twice every day, but he has some cups carved by the skilled craftsman Alcimedon, which he claims are much more valuable. Damoetas says he already has two cups carved by Alcimedon, but the calf is more valuable.

- 49 Menalcas is stung by this into accepting the challenge. Seeing a neighbour, Palaemon, approaching, he suggests he should judge the contest. Damoetas agrees. Palaemon, after commenting on the beauty of the time of year, suggests that Damoetas should begin first.

=== The contest ===
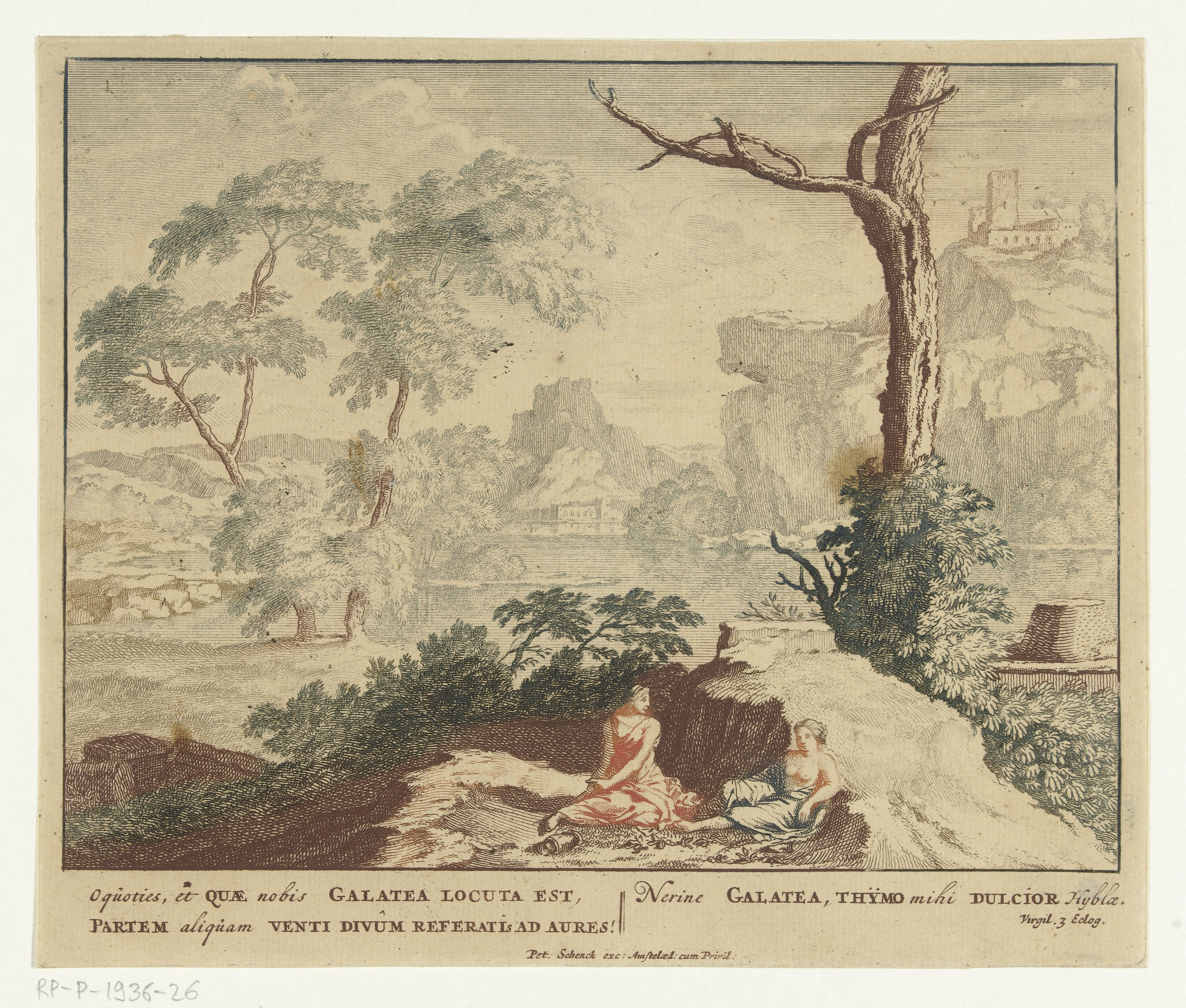
Print by Jan van Call I illustrating Eclogue 3: "O the times Galatea has talked to me and the things she has said! Carry some of them, ye winds, to the ears of the gods!" (72–3)

The second half of Eclogue 3 is devoted to the contest between Damoetas and Menalcas. The contest has twelve rounds with each contestant speaking two lines in each round.

- 60 In his first couplet Damoetas praises Jupiter, and Menalcas replies by praising Phoebus (Apollo). In the next five exchanges Damoetas sings of his success in love with Galatea; but he also has hopes for Phyllis and Amaryllis. Menalcas in reply sings of his love for a boy, Amyntas, who apparently loves him too.

- 84 Next both young men mention Virgil's patron Pollio and his love of poetry, one promising him a female calf, the other a bull. Damoetas praises Pollio and Menalcas replies by disparaging two minor poets, Bavius and Maenius. In his next three couplets Damoetas warns the slave boys to beware of dangers such as the snake hiding in the grass and the crumbling river bank; Menalcas replies in a similar way. Damoetas fears his bull is thin because of love, like its owner; Menalcas thinks his lambs have grown thin because of witchcraft.

- 104 Finally, Damoetas sets a riddle, challenging Menalcas to say in which country the extent of the sky is only three ulnae ("cubits" or "fathoms"); Menalcas asks him to say where in the world flowers are born inscribed with the names of kings. Prizes are offered for the solution of the riddles: Damoetas proposes that if Menalcas knows the answer he will be Apollo himself; Menalcas proposes in turn that if Damoetas answers correctly he may have Phyllis to himself.

- 108 After this last exchange, Palaemon brings the contest to a close, declaring that it is impossible to judge between them, and that both are worthy of a female calf.

== Theocritus and Virgil ==
Eclogue 3 is to a large extent modelled on Idyll 5 of the 3rd century BC Greek poet Theocritus. Theocritus's idyll, set in a rural location near Thurii and Sybaris in southern Italy, has a very similar structure to Eclogue 3: a goatherd Comatas and a young shepherd Lacon first exchange insults, then agree to have a singing contest, one wagering a goat and the other a lamb. They ask a woodcutter, Morson, to adjudicate. Comatas begins by invoking the Muses, and Lacon responds by invoking Apollo. Each contestant sings two verses in each round, as in the eclogue. After Comatas has sung his fifteenth sally, but before Lacon has had time to reply, Morson brings the contest to a close, awarding the prize to Comatas. Among other points of similarity with Virgil's eclogue, Comatas evidently has a sexual preference for girls, while Lacon prefers boys. Comatas also claims to have sodomised Lacon in the past (lines 41–42; 116–117; cf. Eclogue 3.7–9). Another similarity is their dispute over the prizes: when Comatas suggests that Lacon should wager a lamb, Lacon protests that it would be unfair, since a lamb is worth more than a kid.

Virgil's eclogue imitates rather than translates this Idyll 5. He also weaves into it reminiscences of other idylls; for example, the opening of Eclogue 3 translates the opening of Idyll 4, which begins "Tell me, Corydon, whose cattle are these? Are they Philondas's?" – "No, but Aegon's: he gave them to me to pasture." In Eclogue 3 one of the suggested prizes is a pair of wooden cups, which is described in detail; this recalls Idyll 1, in which a shepherd Thyrsis is offered a beautiful cup if he consents to recite his latest poem to an unnamed goatherd.

Eclogue 3 also has elements taken from the pseudo-Theocritan Idyll 8, such as the name Menalcas of one of the participants, and his reluctance to wager an animal because his parents count the herd every evening. Damoetas's words at the beginning of the contest (ab Iove principium Musae) not only imitate the opening of Aratus's Phaenomena but also the opening of Theocritus's Idyll 17 (a hymn to the King of Egypt Ptolemy II).

Hatzikosta (2001) shows how both Virgil and Theocritus subverted the conventions of bucolic poetry by putting sophisticated words into the mouths of uncouth herdsmen.

== Analysis ==
=== Badinage ===
The initial exchange of insults between the two herdsmen is often seen as "unfriendly" or hostile. But Dance (2014) argues that the nymphs' laughter (line 9 and implied in line 10) sets a tone of playful badinage. Jenny Strauss Clay points out that the contest is not completely independent of the earlier parts of the eclogue, but that all the points of dispute in the first half of the eclogue are resolved one by one in the second half, until at last harmony is reached between the two singers.

=== The cups ===
Virgil departs from Theocritus's Idyll 5 in the prizes offered, since in Idyll 5 the two participants eventually agree on a goat and a lamb as wagers. In Eclogue 3, Menalcas offers some beech-wood cups, which is a motif taken from Idyll 1, where a beautiful cup and its decoration is described at length. He declares that they were carved by the craftsman Alcimedon (who is otherwise unknown) and that they have pictures of the astronomer Conon and "who was that other, who described the whole world for the nations with his rod and what times the harvester and the bent ploughman should keep?" Vine and ivy surround the pictures. Damoetas's two cups, however, are decorated with a picture of the mythical singer Orpheus and the woods which followed him. The pictures are surrounded (as was the cup in Idyll 1) by a decoration of acanthus. Segal writes: "This scene ... presents in small that fusion of the real and the mythical which is characteristic of the Eclogues and lies at the heart of their suggestive power."

The identity of the second astronomer on Menalcas's cup has remained uncertain. Ancient commentators suggested Aratus, Ptolemy, Eudoxus, Archimedes, and Hesiod. Those who like Wormell (1960) propose that the second riddle refers to Archimedes' famous orrery (see below) naturally see Archimedes as the answer here too; and the fact that Archimedes was a friend of Conon makes him a natural pair. Springer (1984), however, argues for Aratus, whose poem Phaenomena put into verse a work of the same name by Eudoxus. A strong argument for Aratus, according to Springer, is the possible pun Virgil makes on the word arator 'ploughman' in line 42. This ties in with the clear quotation from Aratus at the beginning of the contest (line 60) and possibly, if J. S. Campbell is correct, to the first of the two riddles in line 105.

=== The contest ===
==== Ab Iove principium Musae ====
The words with which Damoetas opens the contest (ab Iove principium Musae, Iovis omnia plena 'from Jupiter is the beginning, Muses; all things are full of Jupiter') recall both the opening lines of Aratus's Phaenomena ('from Zeus let us begin ... all lands are full of Zeus') as well as the opening of Theocritus's Idyll 17 ('from Zeus let us begin; cease also with Zeus, Muses'). There is some doubt about whether the word Musae is singular or plural. Some take it as plural, as it is, unambiguously, in Theocritus; others take it as genitive singular ('from Jupiter is my Muse's beginning' or 'let my song begin from Jupiter'), comparing Cicero's translation of Aratus, which begins a Iove Musarum primordia 'from Jupiter (are) the beginnings of the Muses'.

==== First riddle ====
A pair of riddles end the contest, which appear to be Virgil's innovation, since there is no parallel to them in Theocritus. These riddles have been much discussed by scholars, who have proposed various solutions.

The first riddle is more difficult and there is no general agreement. One solution proposed by ancient commentators and attributed to Virgil himself by Asconius Pedianus is that since caeli spatium can mean not only 'the extent of the sky' but also 'the extent of Caelius', said to be a wealthy man from Virgil's home town of Mantua, who spent so much money that when he died he had only a piece of land big enough to be buried in. However, few modern commentators take this solution seriously; most assume that if Virgil did say it he was only joking. Another ancient theory was that it referred to a well in Syene (Aswan) in Egypt which was used by Eratosthenes to measure the size of the earth.

J. J. H. Savage (1954) proposed a different explanation. He suggested that just as the contest opens with the words ab Iove principium 'from Jupiter the beginning' it is appropriate that it should end with another god, namely Terminus, who shared the Capitoline temple in Rome with Jupiter. Above the stone which represented the god in the temple, according to Ovid, there was a small opening in the roof through which the sky could be observed. Savage cites an old riddle which plays on the name Terminus as ter minus 'three times less', and suggests that Virgil's tris ... non amplius 'three not more' plays on it in a similar way. Carl Springer (1984) finds this suggestion "cogent", noting that Virgil makes puns on names elsewhere in the poem also.

D. E. W. Wormell (1960), dismissing Savage's solution as "over-ingenious", suggested that the first riddle refers to a remarkable orrery or three-dimensional model of the sky which was designed by Archimedes and brought to Rome by Marcus Claudius Marcellus the conqueror of Syracuse. This orrery is mentioned by Cicero in his book De re publica. There was another similar model made by Posidonius described by Cicero in De natura deorum, a book published in 45 BC, only three or four years before Virgil composed this eclogue. This solution was also adopted by Lee (1980) and Goold (1999) in their editions.

M. C. J. Putnam (1965) argued that just as Menalcas's riddle references the name Hyacinthus, who was associated with Apollo, so Damoetas's riddle ought to reference a name associated with Jupiter. Noting that Latin ulna 'ell, elbow' in Greek is ὠλένη (ōlénē), he suggests that the first riddle refers to Amalthea, the she-goat who suckled Jupiter, who in Aratus's Phaenomena and other poets is called the 'Olenian she-goat', or in Manilius 5.130 simply as Olenie 'the Olenian'. Putnam points out that in Ovid Fasti 5.113, the phrase Oleniae ... capellae 'of the Olenian she-goat' comes immediately after a couplet beginning ab Iove surgat opus 'let my work start from Jupiter'; the latter phrase echoes both Damoetas's ab Iove principium 'from Jupiter the beginning' at the beginning of the contest and the first words of Aratus's Phaenomena ('Let us begin from Zeus'). In return for her services, Amalthea, as the star Capella, and her two kids (Haedi) were placed in the sky as part of the arm of the constellation Auriga 'the Charioteer'. One possible reason for the name "Olenian" was because she is said to have been born in the town of Olenus in Achaea in Greece.

E. L. Brown (1978), noting Aelius Donatus's remark in his life of Virgil that maxime mathematicae operam dedit 'he was extremely keen on mathematics', proposed that the phrase tris ulnas refers to the three sides of a triangle, whose angles add up to 180°, the extent of the sky.

Jenny Clay (1974) noted that the word ulna, which usually means 'elbow', 'ell' or 'cubit' (1½ feet), could also mean 'fathom' (6 feet), the distance between the outstretched hands. She proposed that the phrase tris ulnas, or 18 feet, might refer to three lines of hexameters, and suggested that the first riddle looks back to lines 40–42 of this same eclogue, while the second riddle looks back to line 63.

J. S. Campbell (1982), also taking the view that an ulna could be six feet, suggested that three ulnae could refer to the standard length of a papyrus scroll (about 20 feet). On this basis he argued that the first riddle refers to Aratus's influential astronomical poem Phaenomena. More tentatively he suggested that the second riddle may reference Callimachus's mythological poem Aetia ('Origins, Causes'). This solution would create a neat ring-structure for the contest, since Damoetas's opening words ab Iove principium 'from Jupiter the beginning' translate the opening words of Phaenomena ('from Zeus let us begin'), and in the same way, Menalcas's first and last reply both refer to the hyacinth.

T. K. Dix (1995) suggested that it might refer to the shield of Achilles, which according to one story was washed ashore near the tomb of Ajax; in this way he would link this riddle to the solution of the second.

==== Second riddle ====
Scholars agree that the second riddle refers to the flower hyacinthus (which might not have been the modern hyacinth) which was mentioned in Menalcas's first answer at the beginning of the contest (line 63) as being associated with Phoebus (Apollo). Two stories were told about this flower: one is that Hyacinthus was a Spartan prince loved by Apollo and accidentally killed by him with a discus. The other is that when Telamonian Ajax, a prince who fought in the Trojan War, killed himself, a hyacinth sprang from his blood. The flower has on it markings which resemble the Greek letter upsilon (Υ), for ΥΑΚΙΝΘΟΣ (Hyakinthos), or ΑΙ ΑΙ, for ΑΙΑΣ (Ajax). Two possible answers to the riddle would therefore be Amyclae near Sparta and Rhoiteion near Troy, the burial places of the two heroes.

W. R. Nethercut (1970), who accepted the Caelius solution to the first riddle, argued that the answer to the second riddle is the same, namely Italy. He links the violence of Ajax's suicide and Hyacinthus's death symbolically to the historical violence which had recently taken place in Italy.

T. K. Dix (1995) agreed with Campbell that the second riddle might refer to a book; but rather than Callimachus's Aetia, he suggested that the story of Ajax as well as that of Phyllis were described by Euphorion of Chalcis in a poem about Apollo's grove at Gryneium on the coast of Asia Minor. This poem or parts of it was reportedly translated into Latin by Cornelius Gallus and the grove is also mentioned by Virgil in Eclogue 6.72.

== Characters ==
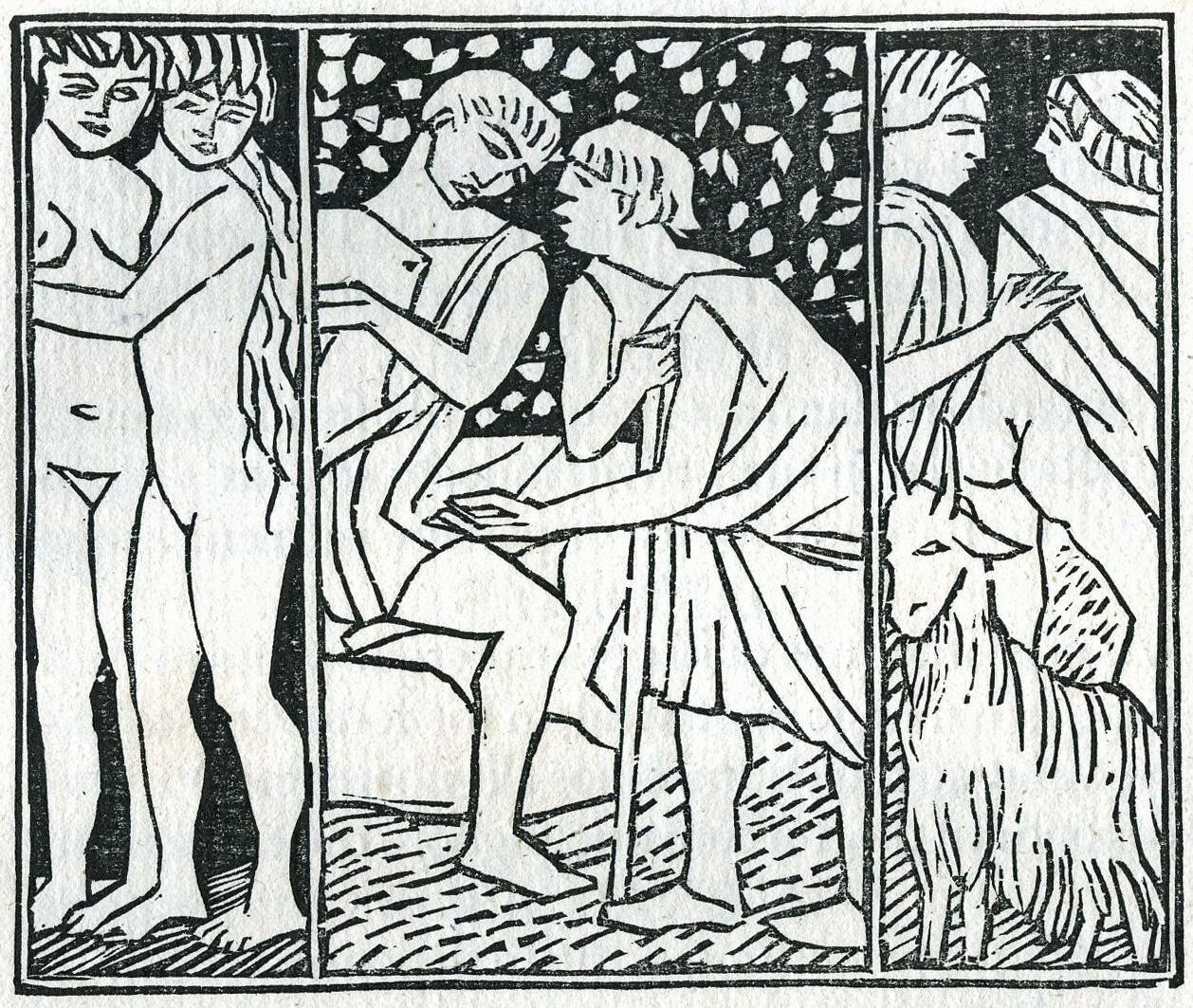
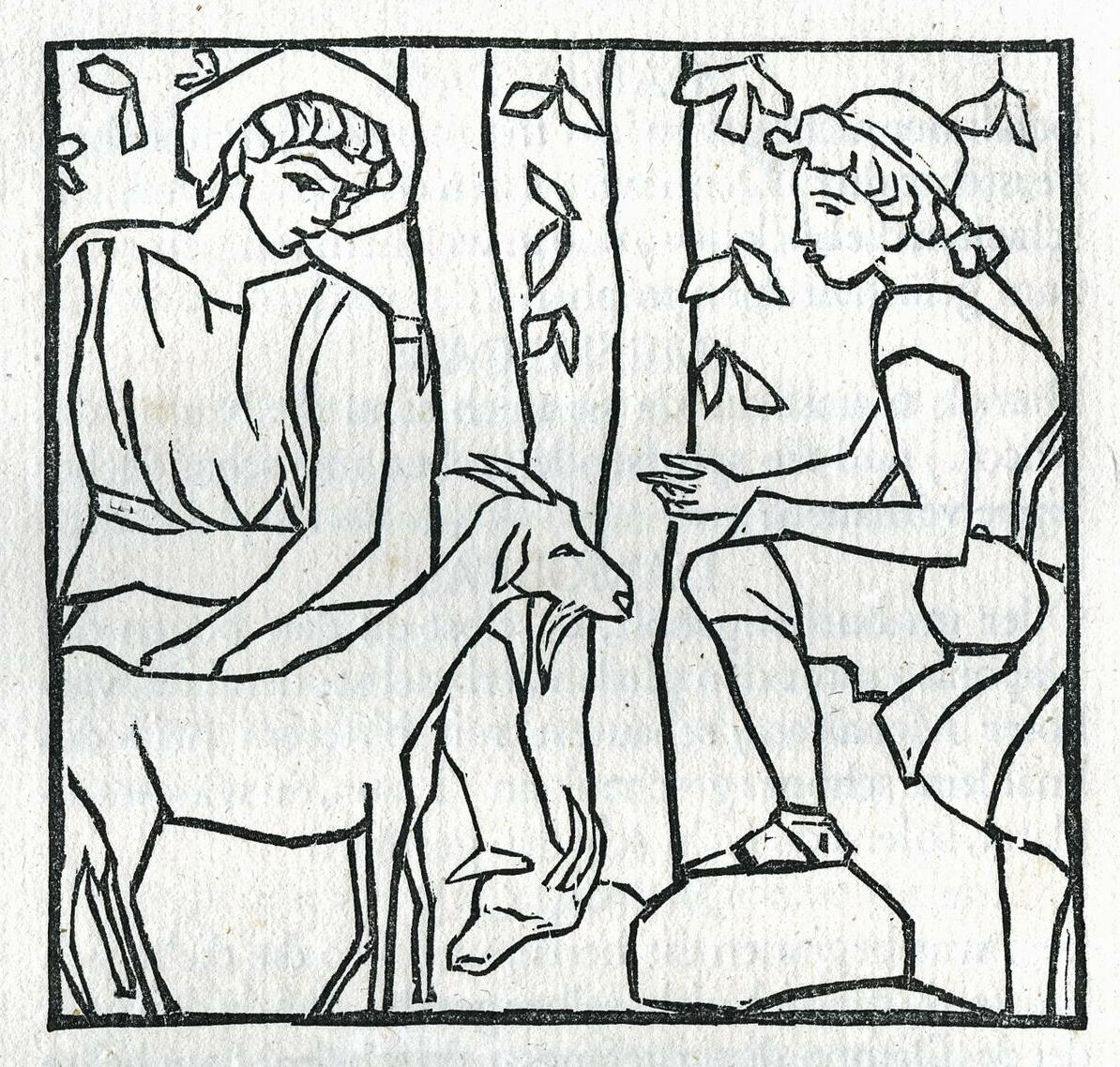
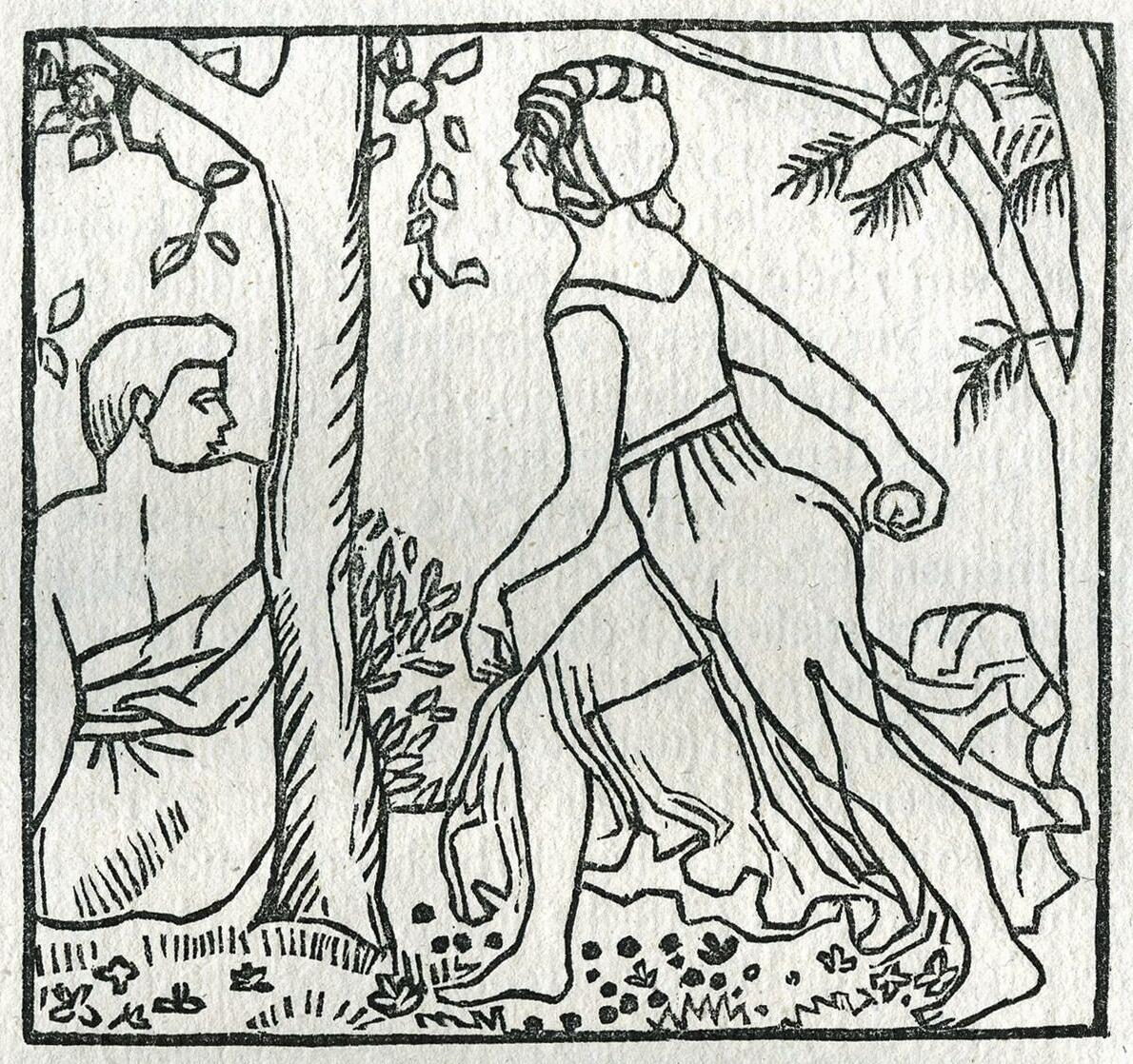
Woodcuts by Aristide Maillol, 1926, illustrating Eclogue 3

The names of several of the characters mentioned in this eclogue recur in other eclogues; the question has been asked whether the various mentions of a particular name indicate a consistently depicted character, and whether any of the characters represent real people. An example is Silenus in Eclogue 6, whom the ancient commentator Servius identified with the philosopher Siro the Epicurean. The view of Hahn (1944) and Flintoff (1976) is that the names do portray consistent characters from one eclogue to another. Also, the characters as they are portrayed in Virgil conform closely to the characters of the same names in Theocritus.

=== Menalcas ===
From as early as Quintilian it has been thought that Menalcas is in some ways a portrait of Virgil. In Eclogue 5 Menalcas declares that he is good at making verses and claims to be the author of Eclogues 2 and 3 (which he quotes by their first lines). In Eclogue 9, a certain Lycidas says that he had heard that Menalcas, through his poems, had managed to save the farm where Moeris works; but Moeris tells him that alas Menalcas's poems were powerless against the soldiers' weapons. Also in Eclogue 9 Moeris quotes from a poem in which Menalcas had promised to compose to honour a certain Varus if Mantua (Virgil's home town in northern Italy) could be saved: it is believed that Varus was one of the land commissioners responsible for distributing land among retired soldiers in 41 BC after the civil war. In Eclogue 10 Menalcas is represented as a cowherd comforting the poet Cornelius Gallus, who is dying of love after being deserted by his girlfriend Lycoris.

Menalcas appears to resemble Virgil in sexual tastes also. Virgil was reportedly attracted to boys and the same appears to be true of Menalcas, who sings of his love for a boy, Amyntas. It is hinted in Eclogue 2.15, 3.8 that Menalcas himself has been a passive partner in sex on at least one occasion. In Eclogue 3.12–15 Damoetas teases Menalcas for having broken Daphnis's bow and panpipes in a fit of jealousy when he learnt they had been gifted to a boy.

=== Amyntas ===
Amyntas, Menalcas's boyfriend, is described as fuscus 'dark, swarthy' in Eclogue 10, and is praised by Menalcas as an excellent singer in Eclogue 5. In Eclogue 2 Corydon claims to have taught him the panpipes. In Eclogue 10, the love-sick poet Gallus imagines him, along with Phyllis, as a potential companion if he lived in Arcadia.

=== Damoetas ===
Damoetas, unlike Menalcas, appears to like girls: he mentions Galatea, Phyllis, and Amaryllis. In Eclogue 3 he is looking after some cattle on behalf of Aegon, who is coupled with Damoetas as a singer in Eclogue 5. In Eclogue 2, it appears that Damoetas has recently died and has bequeathed his panpipes to another herdsman, Corydon.

=== Pollio ===
Another character appearing in this eclogue is Gaius Asinius Pollio, whose consulship in 40 BC receives an honourable mention in Eclogue 4, and is addressed anonymously in Eclogue 8. Pollio appears to have been Virgil's patron at this time, and it appears from 3.85 and 86 that he himself wrote verse and he encouraged Virgil to do so.

=== Bavius and Maevius ===
Two other poets, Bavius and Maevius, who are mentioned here mockingly, are otherwise completely unknown (the names are possibly pseudonymous); except that Maevius has sometimes been identified with the "stinking Mevius" who is the subject of Horace's Epode 10 in a prayer hoping that he may be shipwrecked in a storm.

=== Iollas ===
A certain Iollas is mentioned in Eclogue 2.57, where apparently he is the owner or lover of the handsome boy Alexis. In Eclogue 3 Damoetas requests Iollas to send Phyllis to him to celebrate his birthday, but not to come himself until the harvest festival. One explanation suggested for this is that at the harvest festival sexual relations were forbidden. The interpretation of lines 68–69, literally: 'I love Phyllis before other girls; for she wept that I was departing and long farewell, handsome, farewell, she said, Iollas') is disputed by commentators. Cucchiarelli (2023) interprets these words as Menalcas impersonating Iollas ("when Iollas departed, Phyllis called out to him many times, showing her devotion to him"). Other solutions have been proposed, for example that it was Menalcas who was departing and that the final Iolla is not part of Phyllis's speech but spoken to Iollas by Menalcas himself. Another still unanswered question is whether longum goes with vale (as the ancient commentator Servius thought) or with inquit.

== Sources and further reading ==
- Campbell, J. S. (1982). "Damoetas's Riddle: A Literary Solution". The Classical Journal. 78 (2): 122–126. JSTOR 3297061.
- Clausen, W. V. (1994). A Commentary on Virgil, Eclogues. Oxford: Oxford University Press. ISBN 978-0-19-181927-8.
- Clay, J. S. (1974). "Damoetas′ Riddle and the Structure of Vergil′s Third Eclogue". Philologus. 118 (1): 59–64. doi:10.1524/phil.1974.118.1.59.
- Currie, H. MacL. (1976). "The Third Eclogue and the Roman Comic Spirit". Mnemosyne. 29 (4): 411–420. doi:10.1163/156852576X00294. JSTOR 4430631.
- Dance, C. M. X. (2014). Literary Laughter in Augustan Poetry: Vergil, Horace, and Ovid. Columbia University PhD thesis
- Dix, T. K. (1995). "Vergil in the Grynean Grove: Two Riddles in the Third Eclogue". Classical Philology. 90 (3): 256–262. doi:10.1086/367469. JSTOR 270344.
- Faber, R. (1995). "Vergil Eclogue 3.37, Theocritus 1 and Hellenistic Ekphrasis". The American Journal of Philology. 116 (3): 411–417. doi:10.2307/295329. JSTOR 295329.
- Farrell, J. (1992). "Literary Allusion and Cultural Poetics in Vergil's Third Eclogue". Vergilius (1959–). 38: 64–71. JSTOR 41592195.
- Flintoff, T. E. S. (March 1976), Characterisation in Virgil's Eclogues: A Lecture to the Virgil Society (PDF), pp. 16–26
- Freyer, L. (1981). "The Riddles of Vergil's Third Eclogue". Akroterion. 26 (1): 46–51.
- Greenough, J. B. (1883). Publi Vergili Maronis: Bucolica. Aeneis. Georgica. The Greater Poems of Virgil. Vol. 1. Boston, MA: Ginn, Heath, & Co. pp. 7–10.
- Goold, G. P.; Fairclough, H. R. (1999). Virgil: Eclogues. Georgics. Aeneid I–VI. Loeb Classical Library 63. Cambridge, MA: Harvard University Press.
- Hahn, E. A. (1944). "The Characters in the Eclogues". Transactions and Proceedings of the American Philological Association. 75: 196–241. doi:10.2307/283318. JSTOR 283318.
- Hatzikosta, S. (2001). "How Did Virgil read Theocritus?" (PDF). Myrtia. 16: 105–110. Archived from the original (PDF) on 2022-06-18.
- Henderson, John (1998). "Virgil's Third Eclogue: How Do You Keep an Idiot in Suspense?". The Classical Quarterly. 48 (1): 213–28. doi:10.1093/cq/48.1.213. JSTOR 639764.
- Hopkinson, N. (2015). Theocritus, Moschus, Bion. Loeb Classical Library 28. Cambridge, MA: Harvard University Press. ISBN 978-0-674-99644-1.
- Hubbard, T. K. (1995). "Allusive Artistry and Vergil's Revisionary Program: Eclogues 1–3". Materiali e Discussioni per l'Analisi dei Testi Classici (34): 37–67. doi:10.2307/40236051. JSTOR 40236051.
- Kayachev, B. (2017). "He-Who-Must-Not-Be-Named: Aratus in Virgil's Third Eclogue". Harvard Studies in Classical Philology. 109: 339–352. JSTOR 44863964.
- Cucchiarelli, A. (2023). A Commentary on Virgil's Eclogues. Oxford.
- Moch, K. E. (2017). "Certamen Magnum: Competition and Song Exchange in Vergil's Eclogues". Vergilius (1959–). 63: 63–92. JSTOR 26542609.
- Nethercut, W. R. (1970). "Menalcas' Answer: The Hyacinth in Bucolic 3.106–107". The Classical Journal. 65 (6): 248–254. JSTOR 3295801.
- Nisbet, R. G. M. (1995). "Review of W. V. Clausen, A Commentary on Virgil, Eclogues". The Journal of Roman Studies. 85: 320–321. doi:10.2307/301143. JSTOR 301143.
- Oksanish, J. M. (2017). "Amant Alterna Camenae: Vergil's Third Eclogue at the Dawn of Roman Literary History". Transactions of the American Philological Association. 147 (1): 101–133. JSTOR 26401750.
- Ottaviano, S (2010). "Nota a Verg. ecl. 3,79". Materiali e Discussioni per l'Analisi dei Testi Classici (65): 137–146. JSTOR 25800975.
- Otis, B. (1964). Virgil: A Study in Civilized Poetry. Oxford: Clarendon Press.
- Page, T. E., ed. (1898). P. Vergili Maronis: Bucolica et Georgica. Classical Series. London: Macmillan & Co., Ltd. pp. 111–23.
- Paraskeviotis, G. C. (2016). "The Echo in Vergilian Pastoral". Antiquité Classique. 85: 45–64. doi:10.3406/antiq.2016.3883.
- Powell, B. B. (1976). "Poeta Ludens: Thrust and Counter-Thrust in Eclogue 3" (PDF). Illinois Classical Studies. 1: 113–121.
- Putnam, M. C. (1965). "The Riddle of Damoetas (Virgil Ecl. 3,104–105)". Mnemosyne. 18 (2): 150–154. doi:10.1163/156852565X00142. JSTOR 4429085.
- Savage, J. J. (1954). "The Riddle in Virgil's Third Eclogue". The Classical Weekly. 47 (6): 81–83. doi:10.2307/4343531. JSTOR 4343531.
- Savage, John J. H. (1958). "The Art of the Third Eclogue of Vergil (55-111)". Transactions and Proceedings of the American Philological Association. 89: 142–58. doi:10.2307/283673. JSTOR 283673.
- Schultz, C. E. (2003). "Latet Anguis in Herba: A Reading of Vergil's Third Eclogue". American Journal of Philology, 199–224.
- Schultz, C. E. (2003). "Latet Anguis in Herba: A Reading of Vergil's Third Eclogue". American Journal of Philology. 124 (2): 199–224. doi:10.1353/ajp.2003.0037. JSTOR 1561661.
- Segal, C. P. (1967). "Vergil's 'Caelatum Opus': An Interpretation of the Third 'Eclogue'". The American Journal of Philology. 88 (3): 279–308. doi:10.2307/293208. JSTOR 293208.
- Springer, C. (1983). "Aratus and the Cups of Menalcas: A Note on Eclogue 3.42". The Classical Journal. 79 (2): 131–134.
- Stok, F. (2010). "The Life of Vergil Before Donatus". In Farrell, J.; Putnam, M. C. (eds.). A Companion to Vergil's Aeneid and its Tradition (PDF). Malden, MA: Wiley-Blackwell.
- Wilkinson, L. P. (1966). "Virgil and the Evictions". Hermes. 94 (3): 320–324. JSTOR 4475419.
- Wormell, D. E. W. (1960). "The Riddles in Virgil's Third Eclogue". The Classical Quarterly. 10 (1): 29–32. doi:10.1017/S0009838800024344. JSTOR 637585.

== See also ==
- Battle rap
