= Daphnis =

Son of Hermes and a nymph

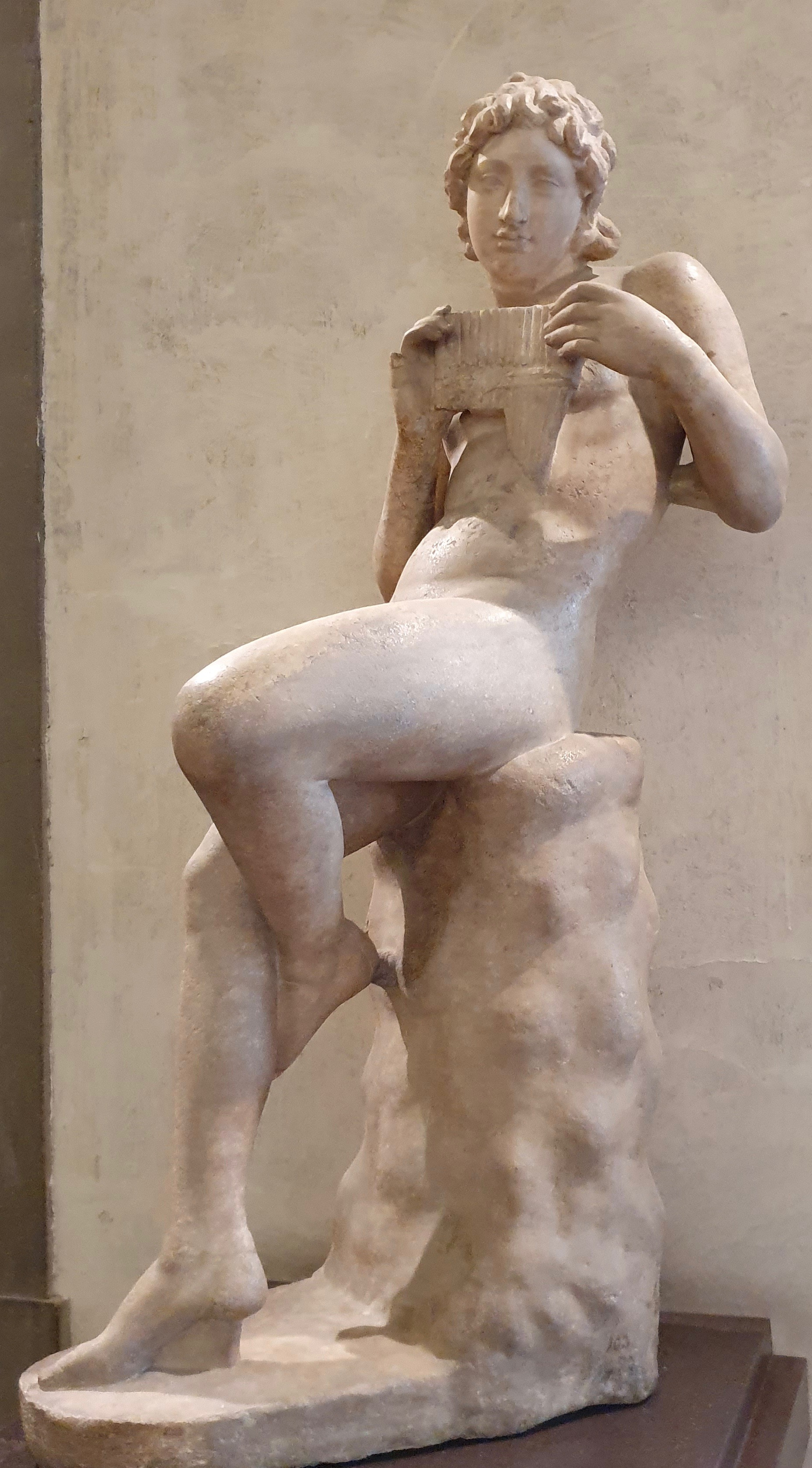
Statue of Daphnis, 1st-2nd century CE, Parian marble

In Greek mythology, Daphnis (/ˈdæfnɪs/; Ancient Greek: Δάφνις, from δάφνη, daphne, "Bay Laurel") was a legendary Sicilian cowherd who was said to be the inventor of pastoral poetry. According to Diodorus the Sicilian (1st century BC), Daphnis was born in the Heraean Mountains of central Sicily.

== Mythology ==
According to tradition, his father was Hermes and his mother was a nymph, despite which Daphnis himself was mortal. As an infant, Daphnis' mother exposed him under a laurel tree, where he was found by some herdsmen who named him after the tree (Greek daphnē) under which he was found. The cows that tended to him as an infant were said to be sisters to the ones owned by Helios. He was also sometimes said to be Hermes' eromenos (beloved) rather than his son. In some versions, Daphnis was taught how to play the panpipes by the god Pan himself, and eventually the two also became lovers.

Daphnis became a follower of the goddess Artemis, accompanying her in hunting and entertaining her with his singing of pastoral songs and playing of the panpipes. A naiad (possibly Echenais or Nomia) was in love with him and prophesied that he would be blinded if he loved another woman. However, he was seduced, with the aid of wine, by the daughter of a king, and, in revenge, this nymph blinded him or changed him into stone.

Daphnis, who endeavoured to console himself by playing the flute and singing herdsmen's songs, soon afterwards died. He fell from a cliff, or was changed into a rock, or was taken up to heaven by his father Hermes, who caused a spring of water to gush out from the spot where his son had been carried off.

Ever afterwards the Sicilians offered sacrifices at this spring as an expiatory offering for the youth's early death. There is little doubt that Aelian in his account follows Stesichorus of Himera, who in like manner had been blinded by the vengeance of a woman (Helen) and probably sang of the sufferings of Daphnis in his recantation. Nothing is said of Daphnis's blindness by Theocritus, who dwells on his amour with Nais; his victory over Menalcas in a poetical competition; his love for Xenea brought about by the wrath of Aphrodite; his wanderings through the woods while suffering the torments of unrequited love; his death just at the moment when Aphrodite, moved by compassion, endeavours (but too late) to save him; the deep sorrow, shared by nature and all created things, for his untimely end (Theocritus i. vii. viii.). A later form of the legend identifies Daphnis with a Phrygian hero, and makes him the teacher of Marsyas. The legend of Daphnis and his early death may be compared with those of Hyacinthus, Narcissus, Linus and Adonis—all beautiful youths cut off in their prime, typical of the luxuriant growth of vegetation in the spring, and its sudden withering away beneath the scorching summer sun.

== Daphnis (nymph) ==
The geographer Pausanias mentions a mountain nymph called Daphnís (Greek Δαφνίς, with a different accentuation). He writes: "Many and different are the stories told about Delphoi (Delphi), and even more so about the oracle of Apollo. For they say that in earliest times the oracular seat belonged to Ge (Gaea, the Earth), who appointed as prophetess Daphnis, one of the Nymphai (Nymphs) of the mountain [Mount Parnassos]." (Pausanias, Description of Greece, 10.5.5, trans. Jones).

== Cultural depictions ==
- Daphnis is the subject of Theocritus's first Idyll, which describes his death.
- Virgil's Fifth Eclogue contains two songs sung by herdsmen, one lamenting the death of Daphnis, and the other celebrating his acceptance into heaven as a god. In his Tenth Eclogue he imagines his friend the poet Cornelius Gallus dying of love in Arcadia, taking parts of Idyll I as his model.

== Gallery ==
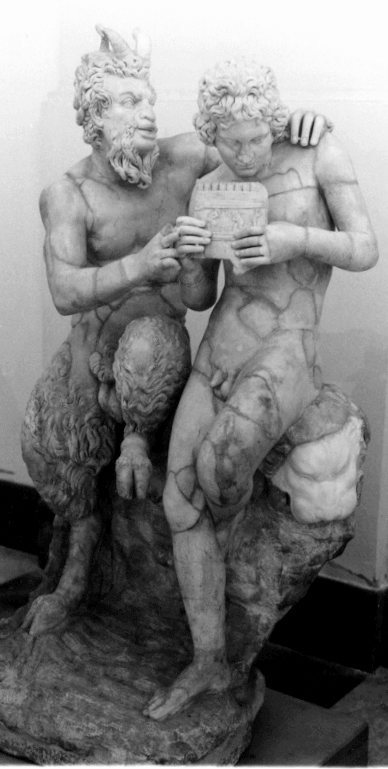
Sculpture of Pan teaching Daphnis to play the pan flute; ca. 100 B.C. Found in Pompeii

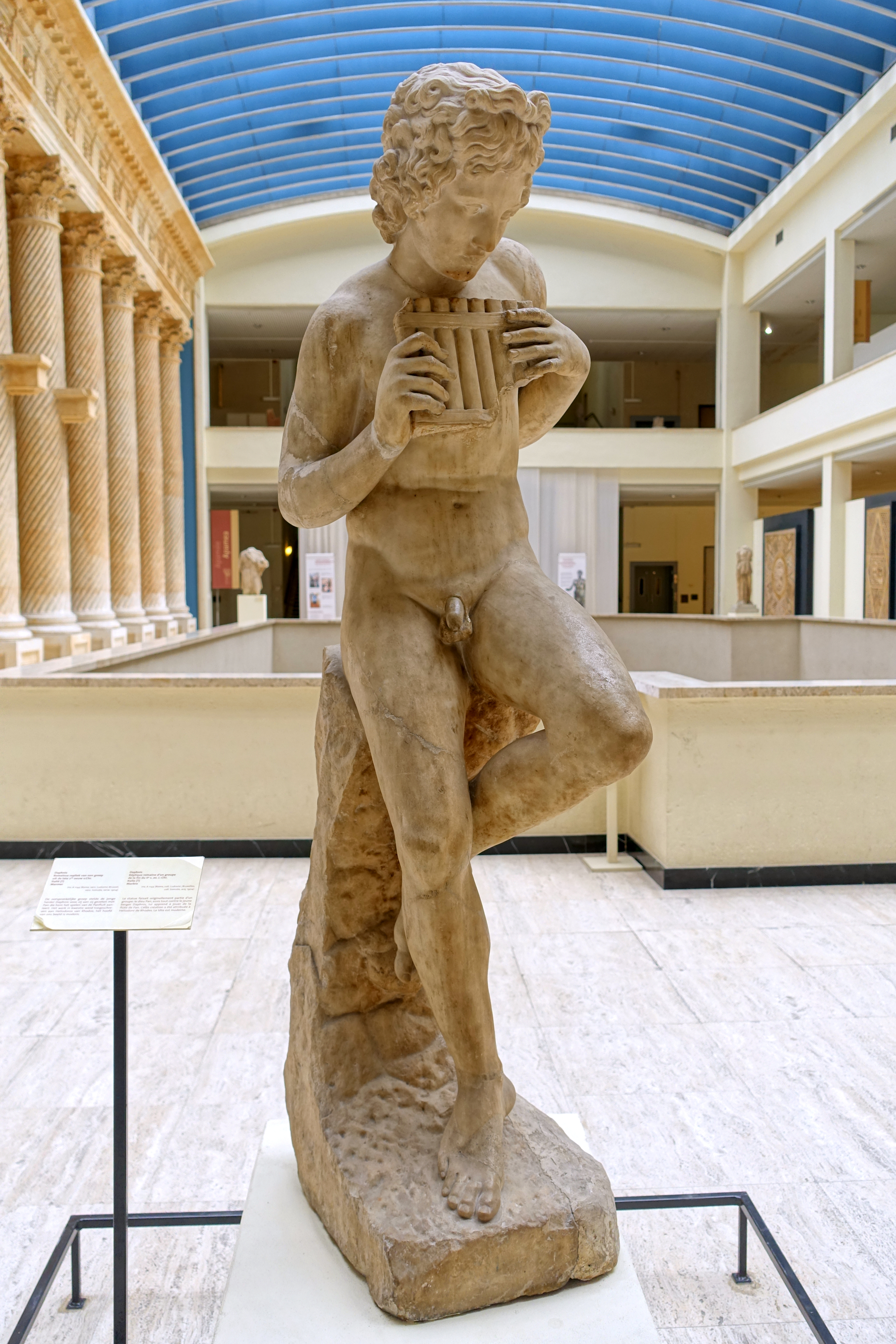
Daphnis, Roman copy from a group from the 2nd century AD at the Cinquantenaire Museum

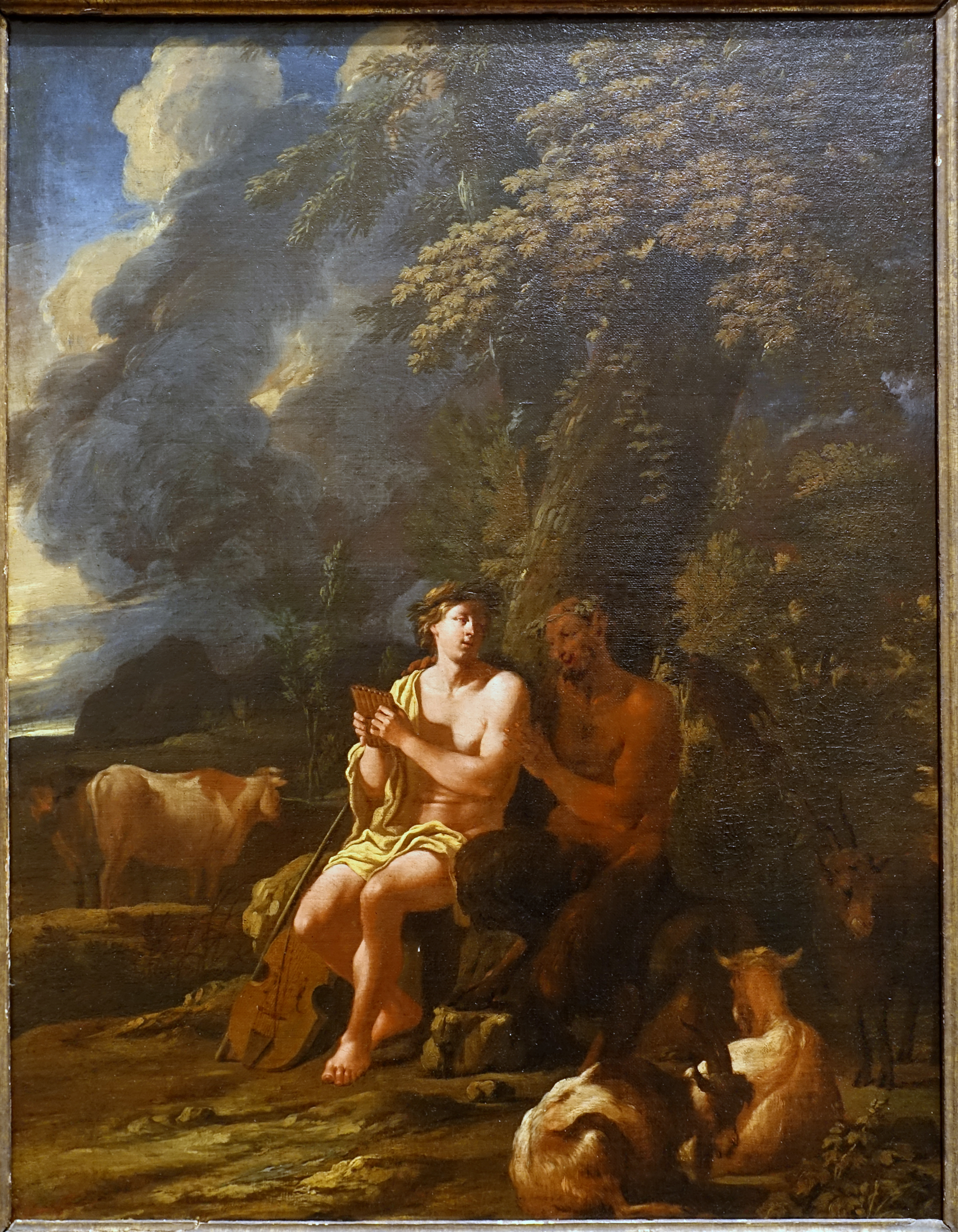
Cavaliere Tempesta showing Pan and Daphnis by Pieter Mulier, c. 1668-1676

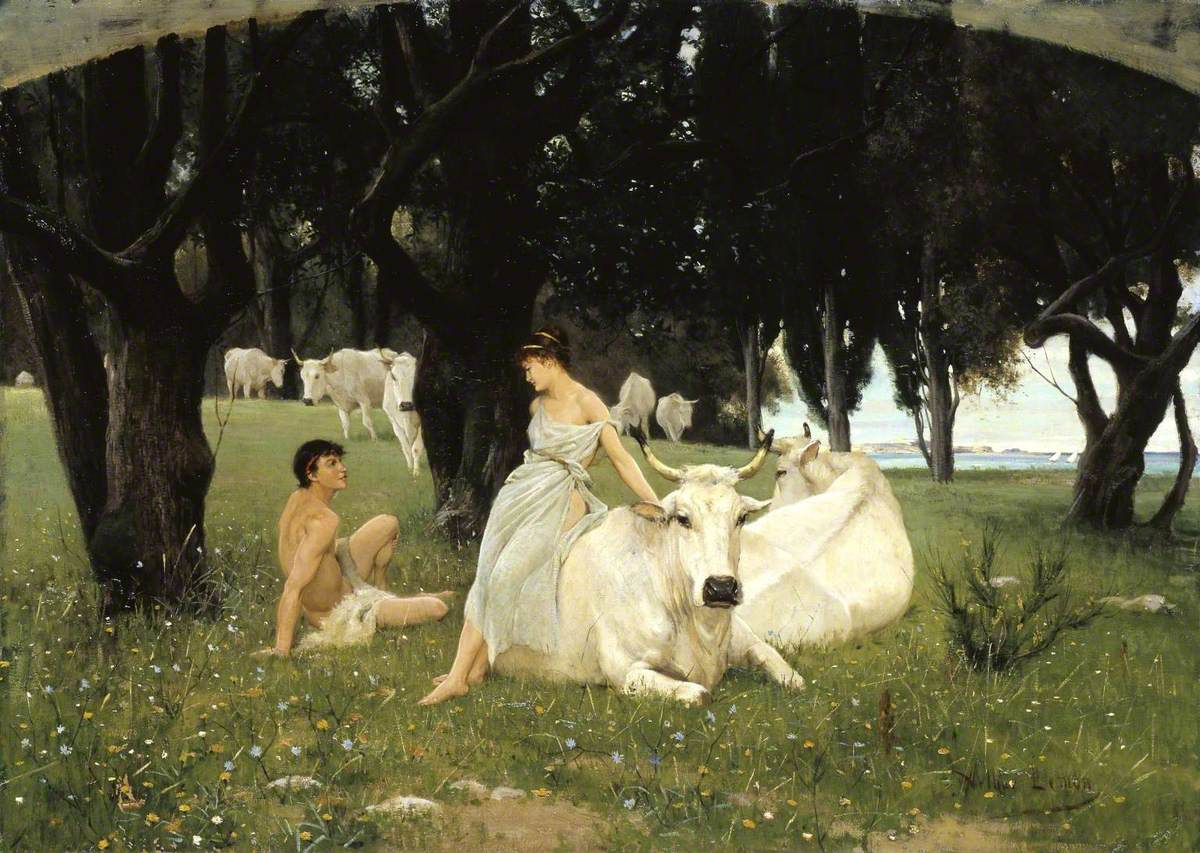
The Wooing of Daphnis by Arthur Lemon, 1881

== See also ==
- Rhoecus, blinded for being unfaithful to a nymph
