= Idyll IV =

Bucolic poem by Theocritus

Idyll IV, also titled Νομεῖς ('The Herdsmen'), is a bucolic poem by the 3rd-century BC Greek poet Theocritus. The poem is a conversation between a goatherd named Battus and his fellow goatherd Corydon, who is acting oxherd in place of a certain Aegon who has been persuaded by one Milon son of Lampriadas to go and compete in a boxing-match at Olympia. (Note: This is not the great Milon, but a fictitious strong man of the same town called by his name.) Corydon's temporary rise in rank gives occasion for some friendly banter, varied with bitter references to Milon's having supplanted Battus in the favours of Amaryllis.

== Summary ==
Battus and Corydon, two rustics, meeting in a glade, gossip about their neighbour, Aegon, who has gone to try his fortune at the Olympic games. After some banter, the talk turns on the death of Amaryllis, and the grief of Battus is disturbed by the roaming of his cattle. Corydon removes a thorn that has run into his friend's foot, and the conversation comes back to matters of rural scandal. The poem, like many of the Idylls, contains a song. The scene is near Crotona in Southern Italy.

== Analysis ==
The reference to Glaucè of Chios, a contemporary of Theocritus, fixes the imaginary date of the poem.

== See also ==
- Corydon (character)
- Ζacynthus
- Eclogue 3

== Sources ==
- Cholmeley, R. J., ed. (1919). The Idylls of Theocritus (2nd ed.). London: G. Bell & Sons, Ltd. pp. 220–8.

Attribution:

- Edmonds, J. M., ed. (1919). The Greek Bucolic Poets (3rd ed.). William Heinemann. pp. 49–59.
- Lang, Andrew, ed. (1880). Theocritus, Bion, and Moschus. London: Macmillan and Co. pp. 19–23.
