= Idyll V =

Poem by Theocritus

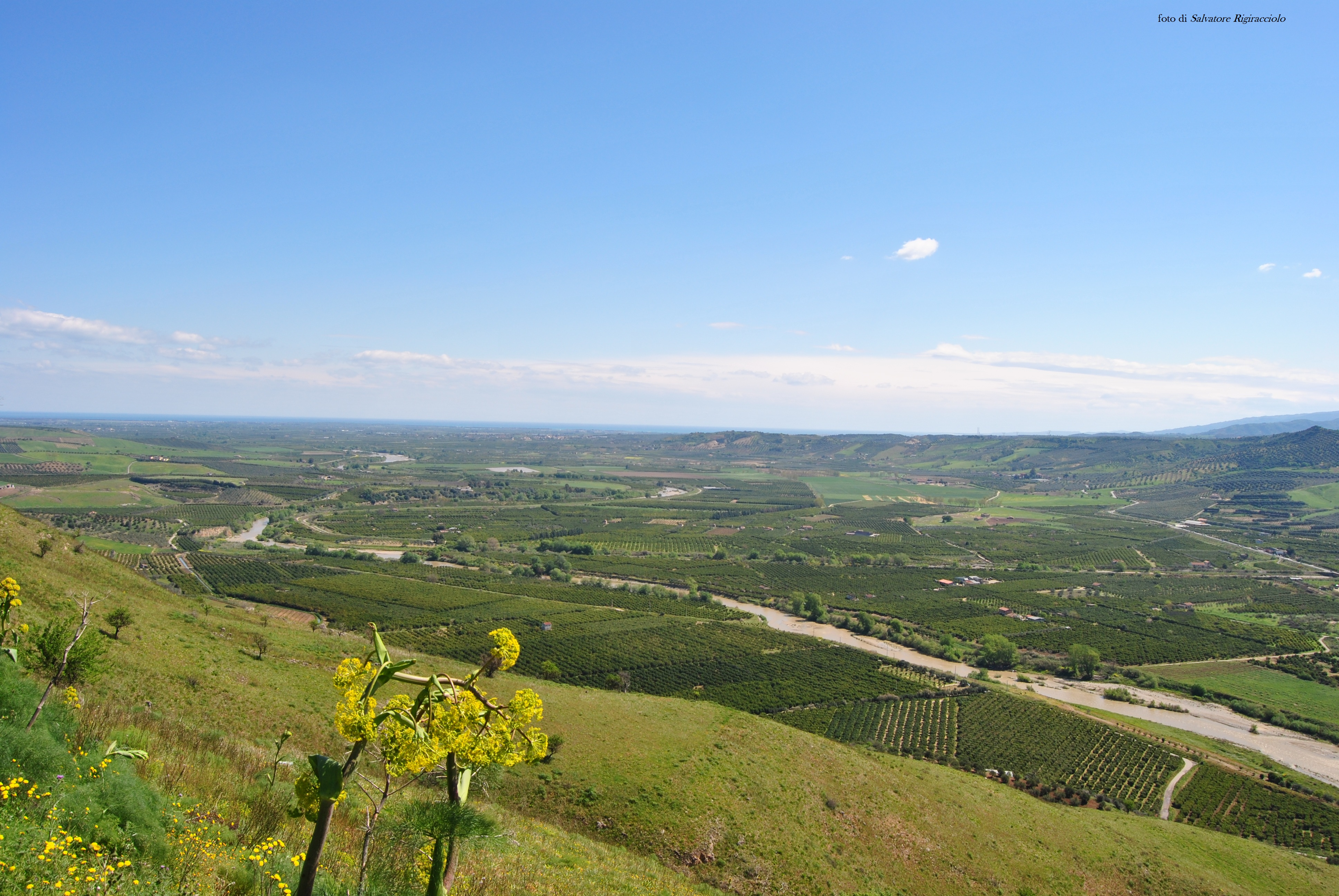
View of the river Crathis seen from the hill Terranova da Sibari

Idyll V, sometimes called Αιπολικόν και Ποιμενικόν ('The Goatherd and the Shepherd'), is a bucolic poem by the 3rd-century BC Greek poet Theocritus. This Idyll begins with a ribald debate between two hirelings, who, at last, compete with each other in a match of pastoral song. The scene is in Southern Italy.

== Summary ==
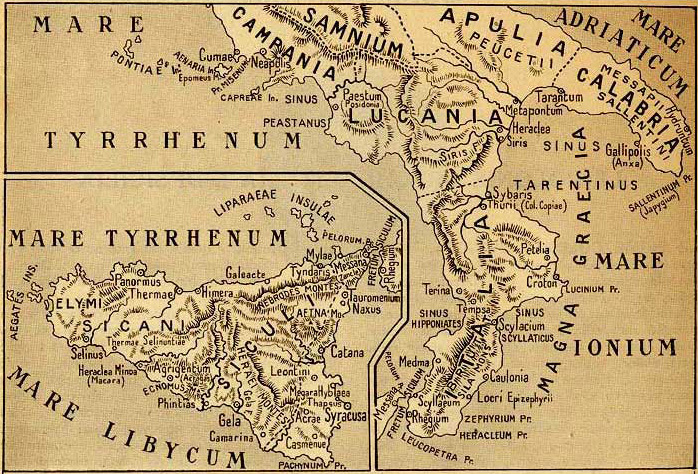
Greek colonies of Italy and Sicily

The scene of this shepherd-poem is laid in the wooded pastures near the mouth of the river Crathis in the district of Sybaris and Thurii in Southern Italy. The foreground is the shore of a lagoon near which stand effigies of the Nymphs who preside over it, and there is close by a rustic statue of Pan of the seaside. The characters are a goatherd named Comatas and a young shepherd named Lacon who are watching their flocks. Having seated themselves some little distance apart, they proceed to converse in no very friendly spirit, and the talk gradually leads to a contest of song with a woodcutter named Morson for the judge and a lamb and a goat for the stakes. The contest is a spirited, not to say a bitter, one, and consists of a series of alternate couplets, the elder man first singing his couplet and the younger than trying to better him at the same theme. After fourteen pairs of couplets, Morson breaks in before Lacon has replied and awards his lamb to Comatas.

== Analysis ==
'Clearista, too, pelts the goatherd with apples as he drives past his she-goats, and a sweet word she murmurs'

According to J. M. Edmonds, "The themes Comatas chooses are various, but the dominant note, as often in Theocritus, is love. In some of the lines there is more meaning than appears on the surface." According to Andrew Lang, "No other idyl of Theocritus is so frankly true to the rough side of rustic manners."

== Imitation by Virgil ==
The poem was imitated by the Latin poet Virgil in both Eclogue 3 and Eclogue 7. In Eclogue 3, the contest is preceded by unfriendly banter and consists of 12 rounds in which each contestant sings one couplet, ending in a draw; in Eclogue 7, there are 6 rounds where each contestant sings four lines, ending, as in Idyll 7, with a victory for the goatherd.

== Sources ==
Attribution:

- Edmonds, J. M., ed. (1919). The Greek Bucolic Poets (3rd ed.). William Heinemann. pp. 61–81.
- Lang, Andrew, ed. (1880). Theocritus, Bion, and Moschus. London: Macmillan and Co. pp. 24–33.
