= Idyll XVII =

Ancient greek poem

Idyll XVII, also titled Εγκώμιον εις Πτολεμαίον ('The Panegyric of Ptolemy'), is a poem by the 3rd-century BC Greek poet Theocritus.

== Analysis ==
The poem is a panegyric or encomium of Ptolemy II Philadelphus, who reigned from 285 to 247 BC. Hauler, in his Life of Theocritus, dates the poem about 259 BC, but it may have been many years earlier. The references to historical personages and events, coupled with a comparison with Idyll XVI, point to 273 as the date of the poem. The Ptolemies, like Alexander, traced their descent from Heracles. Ptolemy I, son of Lagus, was deified about 283, and his queen Berenice between 279 and 275. According to Andrew Lang, "The poet praises Ptolemy Philadelphus in a strain of almost religious adoration."

== Sources ==
Attribution:

- Edmonds, J. M., ed. (1919). The Greek Bucolic Poets (3rd ed.). William Heinemann. pp. 209–21.
- Lang, Andrew, ed. (1880). Theocritus, Bion, and Moschus. London: Macmillan and Co. pp. 86–91.
