= Eclogue 10 =

Pastoral poem by the Latin poet Virgil

Eclogue 10 (Ecloga X; Bucolica X) is a pastoral poem by the Latin poet Virgil, the last of his book of ten poems known as the Eclogues written approximately 42–39 BC. The tenth Eclogue describes how Cornelius Gallus, a Roman officer on active service, having been jilted by his girlfriend Lycoris, is imagined as an Arcadian shepherd, and either bewails his lot or seeks distraction in hunting "with the Nymphs" amid "Parthenian glades" and "hurling Cydonian arrows from a Parthian bow".

According to T. E. Page (1898), "Gallus is conventionally represented as surrounded by Arcadian shepherds, and the whole poem is highly artificial: it is none the less singularly beautiful". Lord Macaulay had an almost unbounded admiration for it. "The Georgics pleased me better [than the Aeneid]; the Eclogues best,—the second and tenth above all."

== Context ==
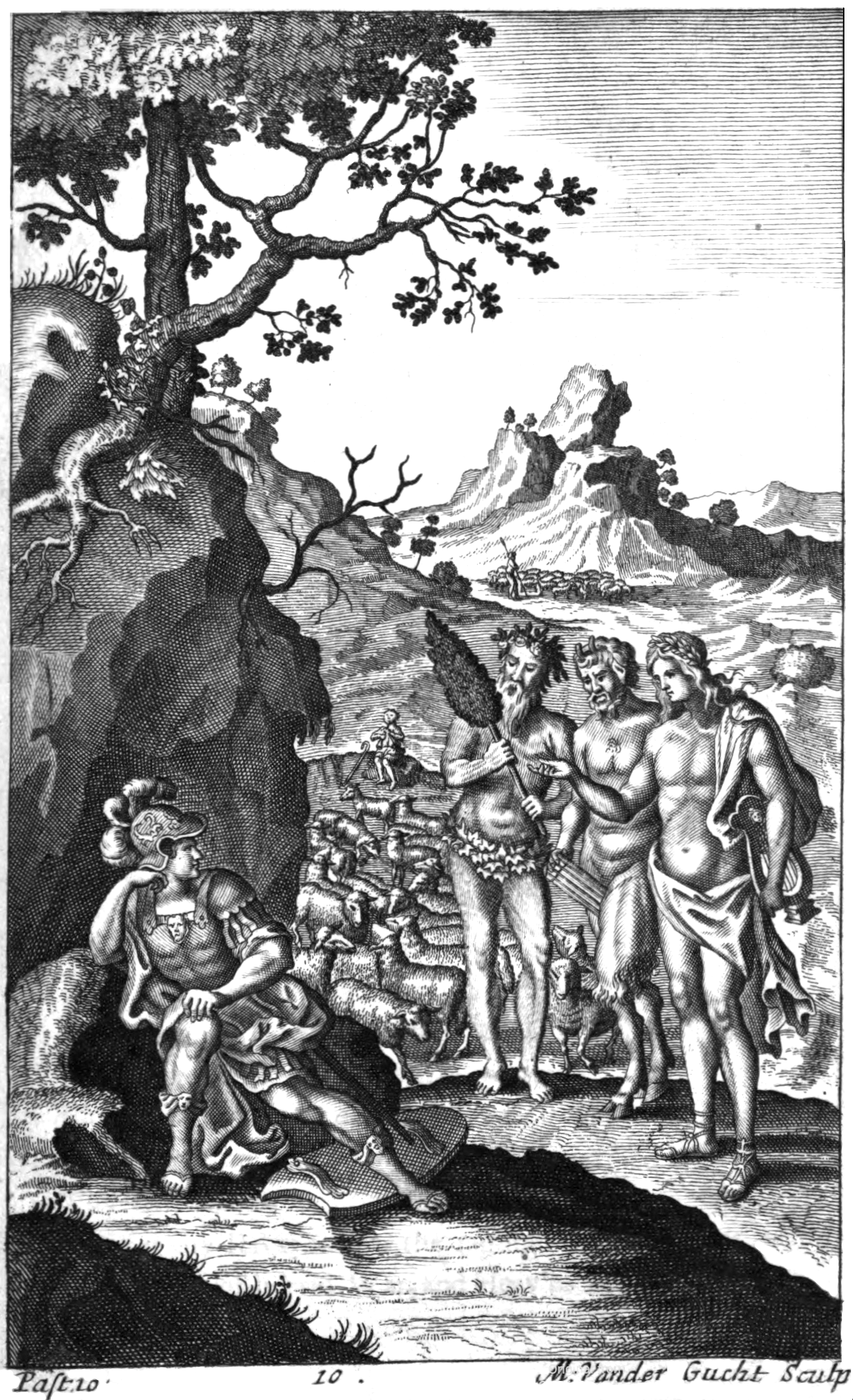
Engraving of Pastoral 10: Dryden's Virgil, 1709

Gaius Cornelius Gallus, born at Forum Julii about 70 BC, was a partisan of Octavian, and is said to have been appointed by him one of the commissioners to distribute land among his veterans in the north of Italy: in that capacity he seems to have rendered Virgil service. He was himself well known as an elegiac writer and is frequently praised by Ovid. He subsequently fought at Actium and was made prefect of Egypt, where however he incurred the displeasure of the Emperor, as a result of which he committed suicide in 26 BC. As this poem shows, he was a close friend of Virgil's. He was about the same age as Virgil, and like Virgil he was a member of the circle of Gaius Asinius Pollio; but he was probably famous as a poet before Virgil began his own work.

This Eclogue describes the grief of Gallus for the loss of Lycoris. She is said to have been a celebrated actress and on the stage bore the name of Cytheris, being really called Volumnia, as being the freedwoman of Volumnius Eutrapelus. According to one view, she seems to have deserted Gallus for some officer on the staff of Agrippa, who led an expedition into Gaul and across the Rhine in 37 BC (cf. lines 23, 46) while Gallus was on military service elsewhere (lines 44, 45).

According to J. B. Greenough (1883), Gallus, a friend of Virgil, had been despatched (apparently) to defend the Italian waters from the freebooting squadron of Sextus Pompey. In his absence, his mistress—here spoken of under the name Lycoris—had been unfaithful to him, and had followed a soldier of Agrippa's army into Gaul (BC 37); and he requested of Virgil a pastoral poem, which might have the good luck to win him back his love. Some modern scholars have doubted this story, however, and have suggested that the war in which Gallus was involved was the Perusine War of 41–40 BC.

== Summary ==
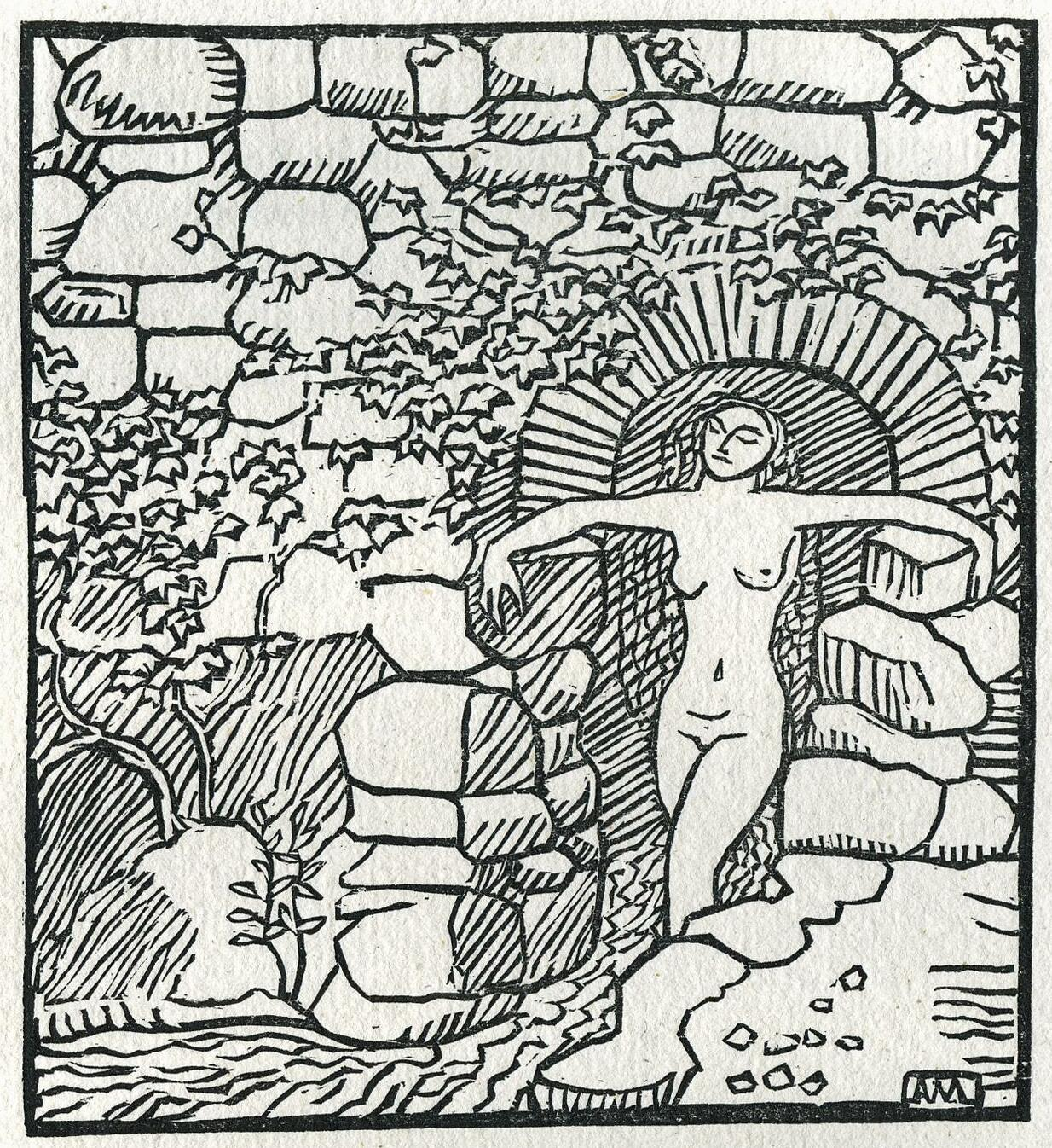
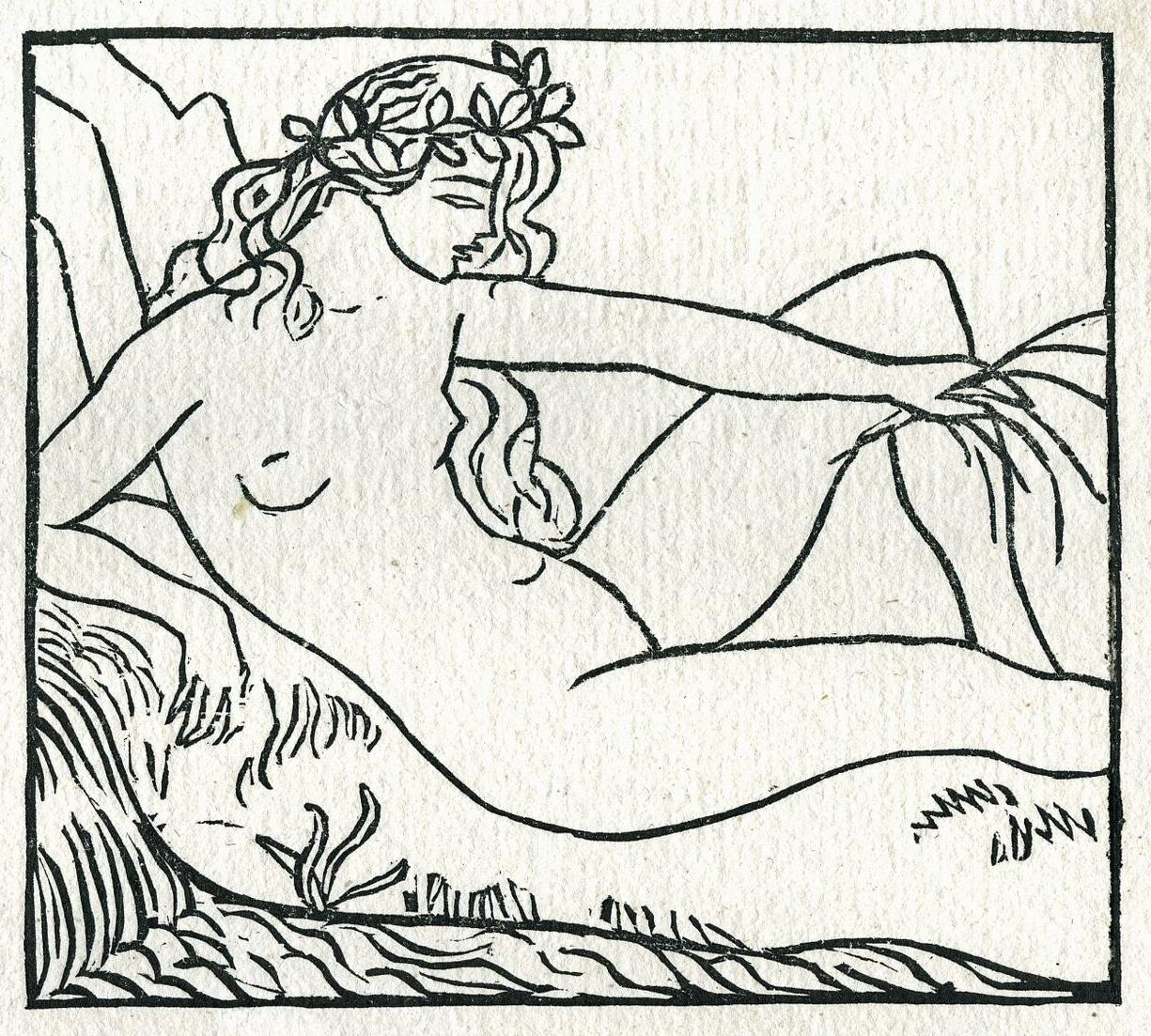
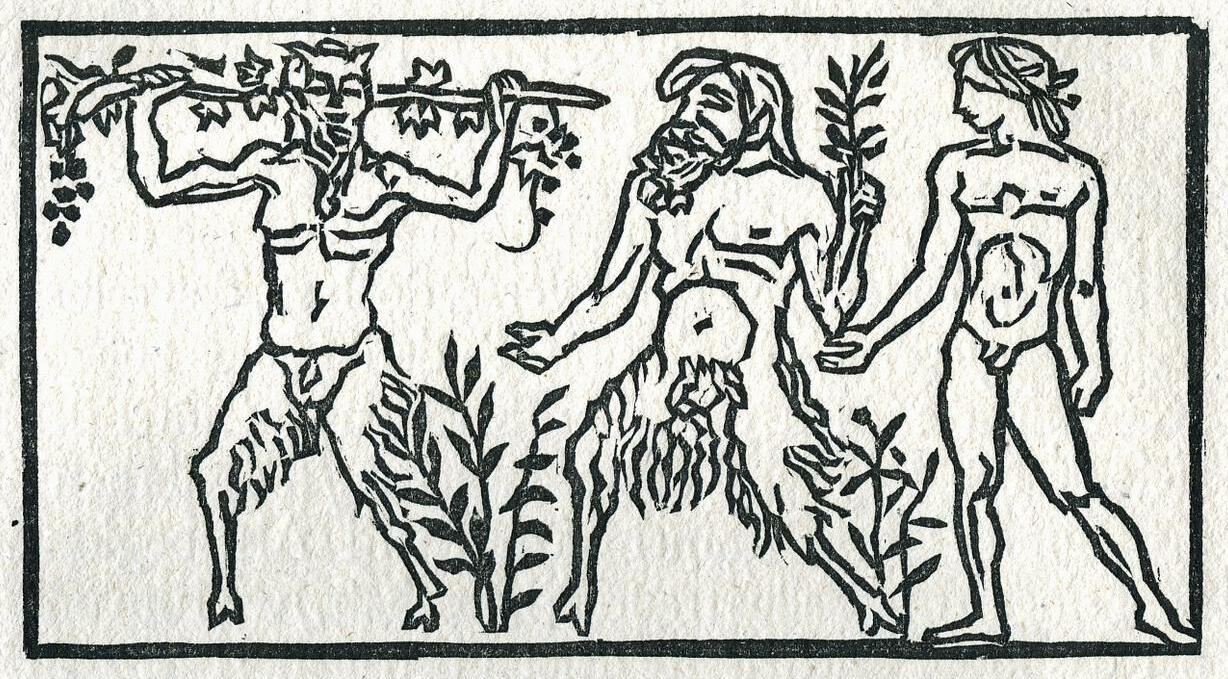
Woodcuts by Aristide Maillol (1926), illustrating scenes from Eclogue 10

The poem has four parts, an address of 8 lines, an introduction of 22 lines setting the scene, the speech of Gallus himself, taking up 49 lines or almost exactly half the poem, and an afterword of 8 lines.

=== Address to Arethusa ===
Virgil addresses the poem to Arethusa (a spring in Syracuse, Sicily, the birthplace of Theocritus), whose waters were said to originate in Arcadia. He says he is going to sing a song for his friend Gallus, but which Lycoris (Gallus's girlfriend, celebrated in his poetry) may also read.

=== Introduction ===
Virgil pictures Gallus dying of love in Arcadia, where the bay trees (sacred to Apollo), myrtle trees (sacred to Venus), and even the mountains, Maenalus and Lycaeus, wept for him as he lay beneath a cliff surrounded by his sheep. The naiads (water goddesses) are mysteriously absent, but a shepherd, a swineherd, and Menalcas (i.e. Virgil himself) in the guise of a cowherd attend him, as well as three gods: Apollo, Silvanus, and Pan (the god of Arcadia), who try to console him. Apollo informs him that Lycoris has followed another man across the snows to a military camp. Pan tells him that the god of Love is unmoved by tears.

=== Gallus's speech ===
Gallus praises the Arcadians for their songs and wishes they will sing about his own love affair. He says he would love to be one of them and perhaps have Phyllis or the handsome Amyntas for companions; or to spend his life with Lycoris among the springs, meadows and forests. As it is, he is detained by an insane love of war in the army, while she has crossed the Alps and is visiting the chilly Rhine. He will now sing his poetry, composed in Chalcidic verse, on the oaten pipe of the Sicilian herdsman. He will carve love poetry on trees, and go hunting for boar with the nymphs in the Arcadian hills. – Yet he realises that the god of Love will not be softened by any such hardships or by poems, not even if he braves the freezing weather of Thrace, or, when the tree with his poems has grown tall, if he tends sheep of Ethiopians beneath the tropic of Cancer. He finishes with the line "Love conquers all; let us too yield to Love" (omnia vincit Amor; et nos cedamus Amori).

=== Ending ===
Virgil ends the poem by addressing the Pierides (another name for the Muses). He tells them that he has made the poem for Gallus, for whom his love grows every hour "as much as the green alder shoots in early spring". The shadows are harmful; Hesperus (the Evening Star) has come; it is time to drive the goats home.

== Analysis ==
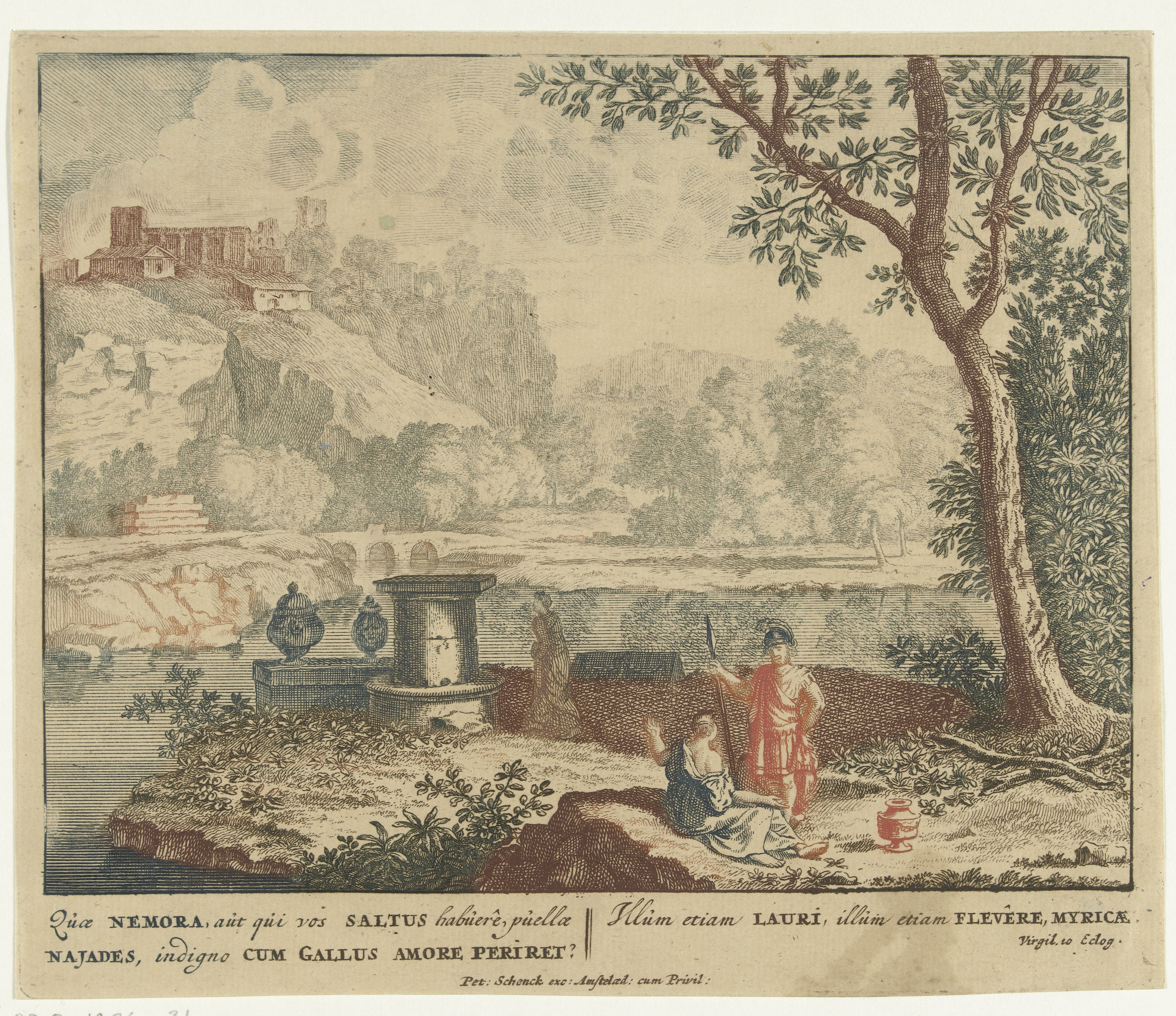
Print by Jan van Call I, Ec. 9, 9–13

=== Different views ===
The introduction (lines 19–30) to Gallus's speech is based on Theocritus Idyll 1, lines 64–145, where a herdsman called Thyrsis sings a song about the death of the legendary cowherd Daphnis. Daphnis is dying of love in Theocritus's poem, attended by herdsmen of different types, much as in Eclogue 10. But there are some differences: in Theocritus Daphnis is dying in Sicily, not Arcadia; he is surrounded by cows, not sheep; and the gods who visit him are Hermes, Priapus, and Cypris (Aphrodite), the goddess of love. In the end Daphnis rejects Aphrodite's pleas and actually dies, whereas Gallus gives in to Love and survives. Perkell (1996) writes: "Thus the fates of Daphnis and of Gallus are not parallel, but rather precisely opposed. ... Although speaking paradoxically in the language of defeat, Gallus, in fact, compelled by love of Lycoris, abandons his pursuit of death and chooses life." For this reason she takes a more positive view of the poem than is usually found.

Several scholars, on the other hand, have seen this eclogue as rather a pessimistic, sombre piece. For example, van Sickle (1980) writes that Eclogue 10 ends on a "somber note, defeat and death through love, then threatening shadows, cold". Ross (1975) writes that Eclogue 10 "ends with the realization of failure: there is no theme more Virgilian than this." Others such as Otis, Damon, and Boyle, have also taken a negative view.

=== Arcadia ===
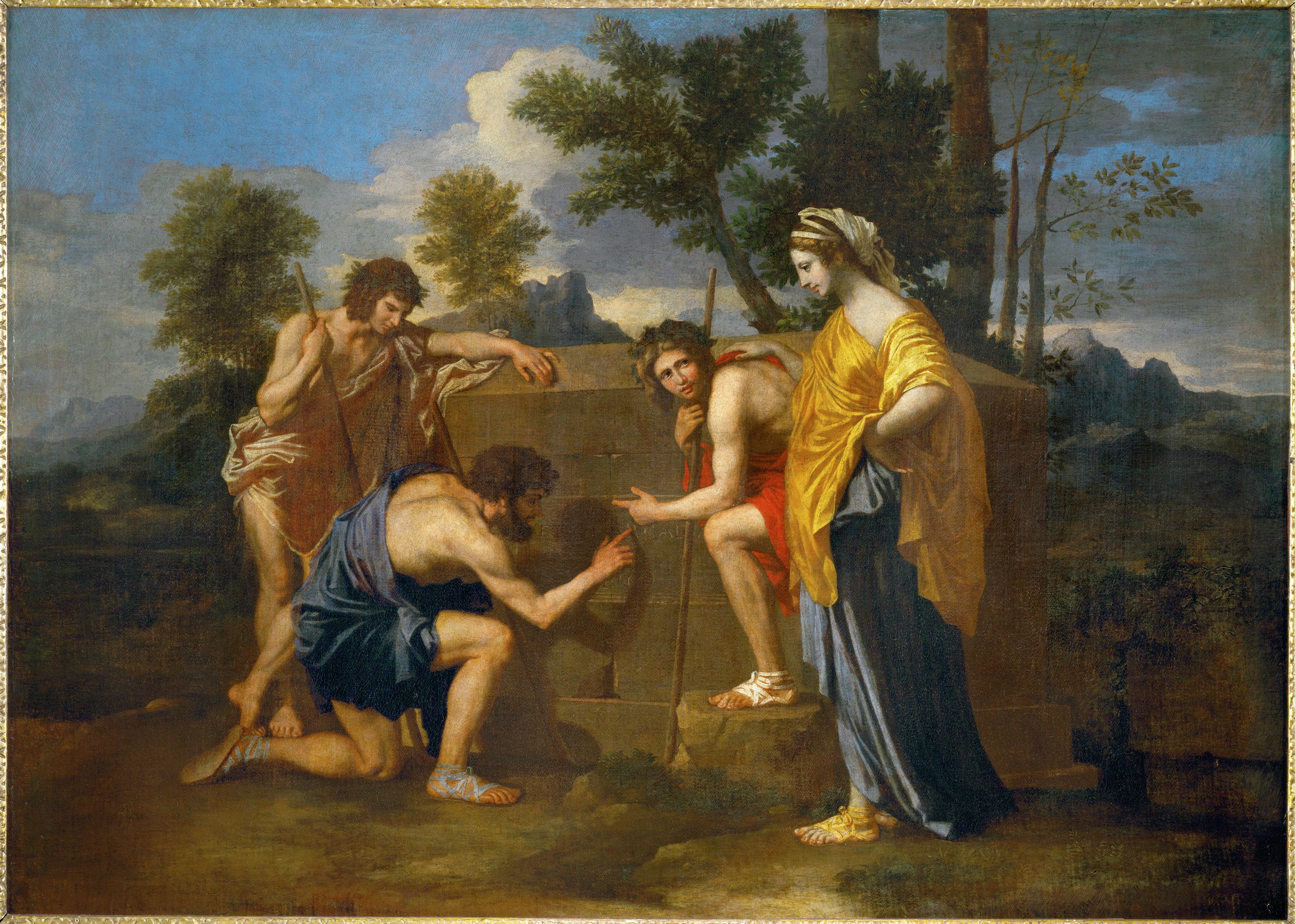
Poussin's Et in Arcadia Ego (1638)

Theocritus sets his death of Daphnis in Sicily, but Virgil changes this to Arcadia, thus creating the ideal bucolic world that was developed in Renaissance times in works such as Jacopo Sannazaro's Arcadia (1480) and Poussin's painting Et in Arcadia ego (1638). According to a well-known essay by Bruno Snell, Virgil more or less invented the idea of Arcadia as a mythical landscape, based on a passage in the historian Polybius, a native of Arcadia, who wrote of the Arcadians' love of singing and their delight in organising musical contests. He writes: "Virgil needed a new home for his herdsmen, a land far distant from the sordid realities of the present ... he needed a far-away land, overlaid with the golden haze of unreality." According to Stephen Barber, the various passages in the Eclogues describing a beautiful rural scene "evoke a common world, an idealized landscape, and in Eclogue 10 this is called Arcadia. At times it resembles Italy, at times Sicily, at times the geographical Arcadia but at the end of the day it is a country of the mind."

=== Ending ===
The poem ends as follows (lines 75–77):

Surgamus: solet esse gravis cantantibus umbra,
iuniperi gravis umbra; nocent et frugibus umbrae.
Ite domum saturae, venit Hesperus, ite, capellae.

"Let us rise: shadow tends to be dangerous for singers;
the shadow of the juniper is harmful; shadows also harm crops.
Go home well fed, Hesperus has come, go home, she-goats."

Among other puzzling features of these lines are the thrice-repeated umbra "shade"; the fact that elsewhere in Virgil shade is usually regarded as pleasant, not harmful; and that the juniper nowhere else has a reputation for harmful shade. Piacenza (2023) suggests that the answer may be that the lines contain a hidden anagram of the name of the Umbrian town of Perusia (modern Perugia), where in 41–40 BC a destructive siege took place (the Perusine War) between the forces of Octavian and those supporting Mark Antony. But the word umbra also means "Umbrian"; the words iuniperi gravis contain an anagram of vi agri Perusini 'by violence the Perusine fields', and the phrase Hesperus, ite capellae contains the name Perusia. He also suggests that is possible that in the words amor ... vere in lines 73–74 Virgil conceals his own name "Ver. Maro".

== See also ==
- Arcadia (utopia)

== Sources and further reading ==
- Barber, S. (2015). "Arcadia and ideal landscape in Virgil's Eclogues". Academia.
- Conte, G. B. (2008). "An interpretation of the Tenth Eclogue". Oxford Readings in Classical Studies. Vergil's Eclogues, Oxford–New York, 216–244.
- Dyer, R. R. (1969). "Vergil Eclogue 10.73–74 and the Suckering Habit of the White Alder". Classical Philology, 64(4), 233–234.
- Greenough, J. B., ed. (1883). Publi Vergili Maronis: Bucolica. Aeneis. Georgica. The Greater Poems of Virgil. Vol. 1. Boston, MA: Ginn, Heath, & Co. pp. 27–9. (Public domain)
- Page, T. E., ed. (1898). P. Vergili Maronis: Bucolica et Georgica. Classical Series. London: Macmillan & Co., Ltd. pp. 172–8. (Public domain)
- Perkell, C. G. (1996). "The 'Dying Gallus' and the Design of Eclogue 10". Classical Philology. 91 (2): 128–40. doi:10.1086/367503. JSTOR 270501. S2CID 161911830.
- Piacenza, N. (2023). "The Shadow of the Bellum Perusinum in the Ending of Vergil's Eclogues". Classical Philology, 118(3), 403–408.
- Raymond, E. (2013). "Caius Cornelius Gallus". The Cambridge Companion to Latin Love Elegy, pp. 59–67.
- Snell, B. (1953). "Arcadia: the Discovery of a Spiritual Landscape". In The Discovery of the Mind: the Greek Origins of European Thought, translated by T. G. Rosenmeyer. Oxford, Blackwell (German original 1948). Reprinted in Hardie, P. (ed.) (1999). Virgil: Critical Assessments of Classical Authors, vol I. (Google Books)
- Syme, R. (1938). "The Origin of Cornelius Gallus". The Classical Quarterly, 32(1), 39–44.
- Trevelyan, G. O., ed. (1876). The Life and Letters of Lord Macaulay. Vol. 1. London: Longmans, Green, and Co. p. 371.
- Wilkinson, L. P. (1966). "Virgil and the Evictions". Hermes, 94(H. 3), 320–324.
