= Idyll XVI =

Ancient greek poem

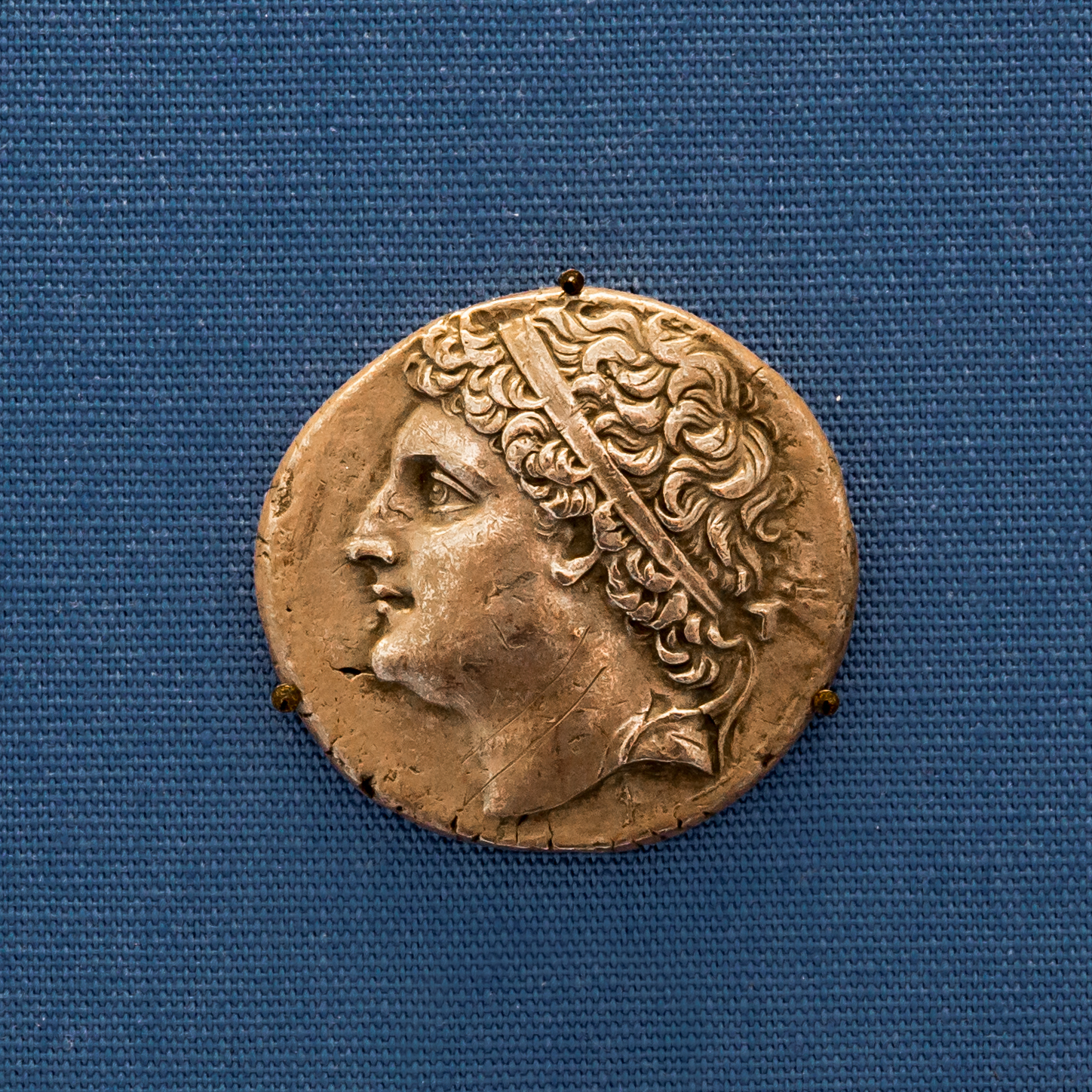
Silver 32-litra piece of Hiero II

'Hiero, like the mighty men of old, girds himself for fight, and the horse-hair crest is shadowing his helmet'

Idyll XVI, also called Χάριτες ('The Charities') or Ἱέρων ('Hiero'), is a poem by the 3rd-century BC Greek poet Theocritus. In it the poet bewails the indifference of a money-loving age, and asks for the patronage of Hiero, then general-in-chief, afterwards king, of Syracuse.

== Summary ==
In 265 BC Sicily was devastated by the Carthaginians, and by the companies of disciplined free-lances who called themselves Mamertines, or 'Mars's men'. The hopes of the Greek inhabitants of the island were centred in Hiero, son of Hierocles, who was about to besiege Messana (then held by the Carthaginians) and who had revived the courage of the Syracusans. To him Theocritus addressed this idyll, in which he complains of the sordid indifference of the rich, rehearses the merits of song, dilates on the true nature of wealth, and of the happy life, and finally expresses his hope that Hiero will rid the isle of the foreign foe, and will restore peace and pastoral joys.

== Analysis ==
According to J. M. Edmonds, the traditional name of this poem, Χάριτες ('The Charites' or 'The Graces'), may have been really the title Theocritus had given to the whole volume of a small collection of poems, for which this poem was now written as a special dedication. The idyll contains some allusions to Simonides, the old lyric poet, and to his relations with the famous Hiero, tyrant of Syracuse.

== See also ==
- Sicilian Wars

== Sources ==
- Austin, Norman (1967). "Idyll 16: Theocritus and Simonides". Transactions and Proceedings of the American Philological Association. 98: 1–21. doi:10.2307/2935864. JSTOR 2935864.

Attribution:

- Edmonds, J. M., ed. (1919). The Greek Bucolic Poets (3rd ed.). William Heinemann. pp. 197, 207.
- Lang, Andrew, ed. (1880). Theocritus, Bion, and Moschus. London: Macmillan and Co. pp. 81–5.
