= Jan van Call =

Dutch painter

Jan van Call (1655–1703) was an artist born, according to Descamps, at Nijmegen in 1655. He is said to have attained considerable proficiency in painting without the help of an instructor. His first attempts were made in copying the landscapes of Jan Brueghel, Paulus Bril, and Willem van Nieulant, and he studied attentively the principles of perspective and architecture. He afterwards travelled through Switzerland to Italy, and, during a residence of some years at Rome, formed an ample collection of designs from the most picturesque views in the environs of that capital. He returned through Germany to his native country, and established himself at the Hague, where he died in 1703. His drawings are more esteemed than his pictures; they are purchased at considerable prices in the Netherlands, where they are found in the choicest collections. It is believed that he occasionally worked in conjunction with Bakhuisen. A series of views from his drawings, chiefly representing scenes on the Rhine, have been published by Schenk. He was also clever as an engraver, his plates being principally landscapes from his own designs.
