= Idyll I =

Bucolic poem by Theocritus

Idyll I, sometimes called Θύρσις ('Thyrsis'), is a bucolic poem by the 3rd-century BC Greek poet Theocritus which takes the form of a dialogue between two rustics in a pastoral setting. Thyrsis meets a goatherd in a shady place beside a spring, and at his invitation sings the story of Daphnis. This ideal hero of Greek pastoral song had won for his bride the fairest of the Nymphs. Confident in the strength of his passion, he boasted that Love could never subdue him to a new affection. Love avenged himself by making Daphnis desire a strange maiden, but to this temptation he never yielded, and so died a constant lover. The song tells how the cattle and the wild things of the wood bewailed him, how Hermes and Priapus gave him counsel in vain, and how with his last breath he retorted the taunts of Aphrodite.

== Summary ==
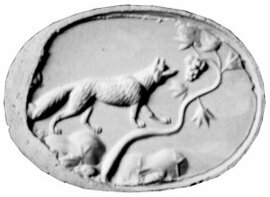
Chalcedony scaraboid seal stone: 4th cent. BC. Fox and vine.

A shepherd and a goatherd meet in the pastures one noontide and compliment each other upon their piping. The shepherd, Thyrsis by name, is persuaded by the other—for a cup which he describes but does not at first show—to sing him The Affliction of Daphnis, a ballad which tells how the legendary cowherd, friend not only of Nymph and Muse, but of all the wild creatures, having vowed to his first love that she should be his last, pined and died for the love of another.

The song is divided into three parts marked by changes in the refrain. The first part, after a complaint to the Nymphs of their neglect, tells how the herds and the herdsmen gathered about the dying man, and Hermes his father, and Priapus the country-god of fertility whom he had flouted, came and spoke and got no answer. In the second part, the slighted Love-Goddess comes, and gently upbraids him, whereat he breaks silence with a threat of vengeance after death. He then makes a speech, (Note: The lines of his speech tell in veiled ironic terms what the vengeance of this friend of wild things will be; for Anchises was afterwards blinded by bees, Adonis slain by a boar, and Cypris herself wounded by Diomed.) and the speech is continued with a farewell to the wild creatures, and to the wells and rivers of Syracuse. In the third part he bequeaths his pipe to Pan, ends his dying speech with an address to all Nature, and is overwhelmed at last in the river of Death. Thyrsis comes from Sicily, which is the scene of his song.

== Theocritus Cup ==
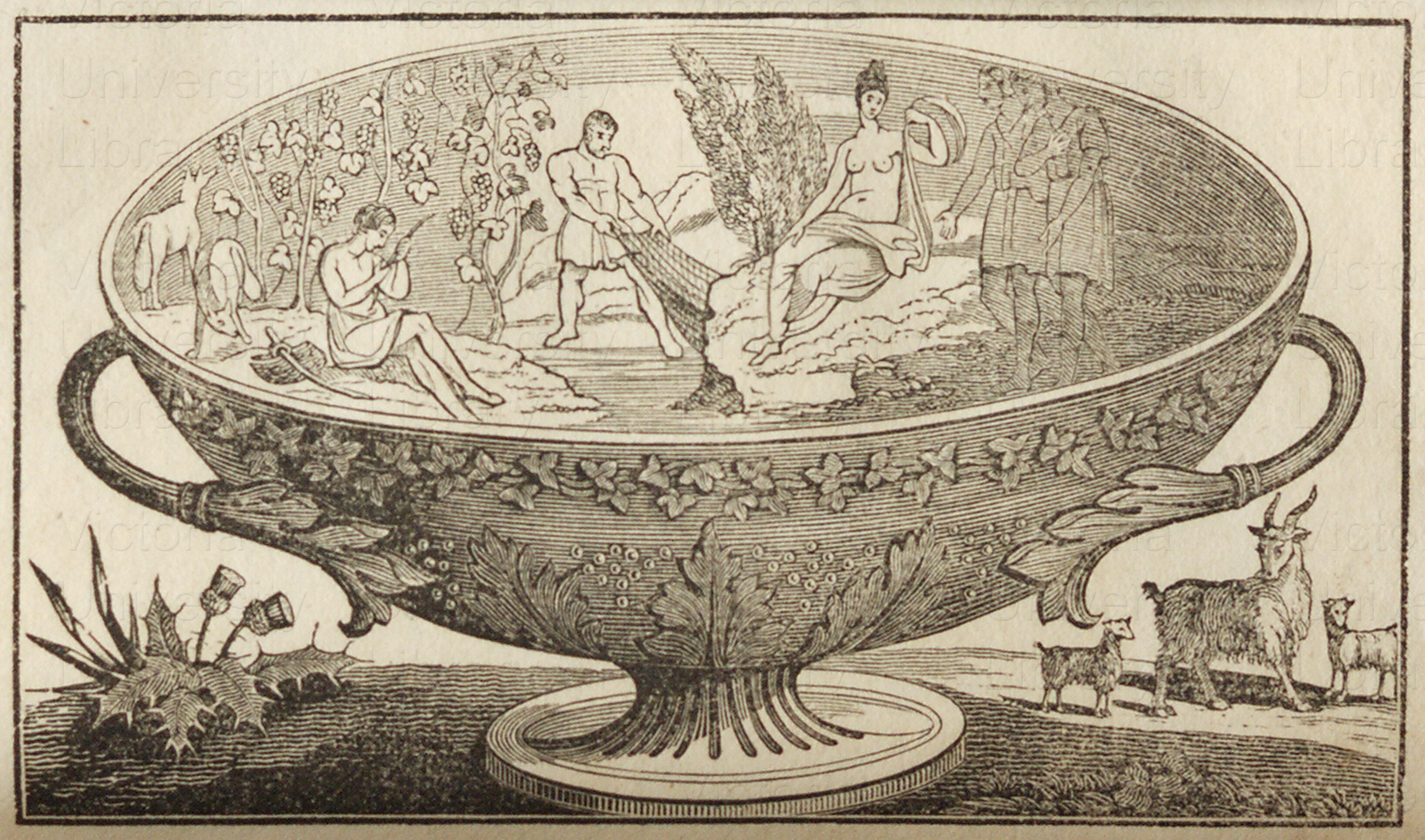
Artist's interpretation of the cup as described by the goatherd (ll. 29–56)

The ecphrasis of the cup inspired drawings by John Flaxman from which four silver-gilt Neoclassical vases were produced. The first was commissioned by Queen Charlotte as a gift for her son the Prince Regent in 1812.

== Illustrations ==
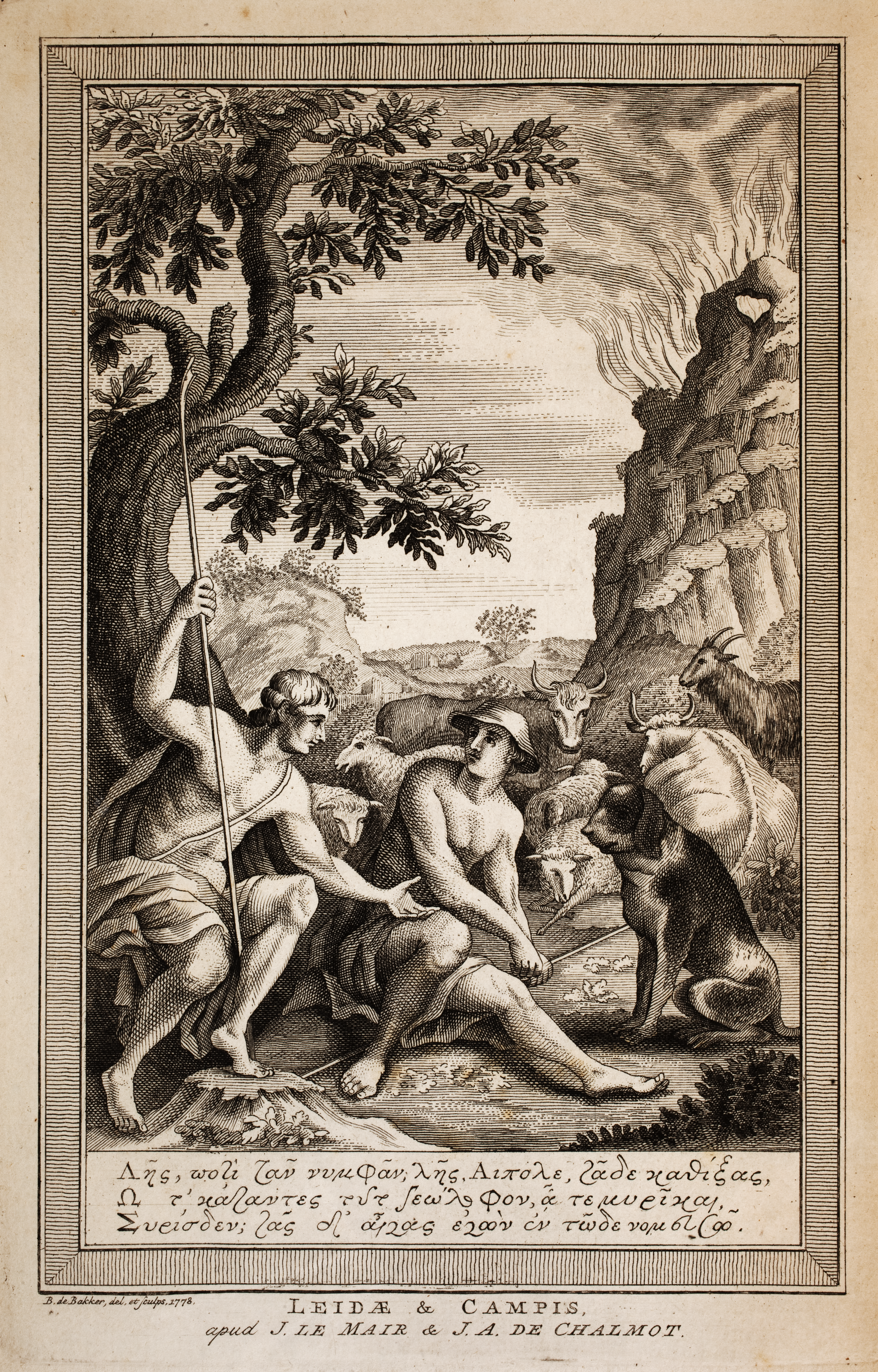
Bucolic scene with two shepherds, illustrating Idyll I (ll. 12–14)

'Sweet, meseems, is the whispering sound of yonder pine tree, goatherd, that murmureth by the wells of water'

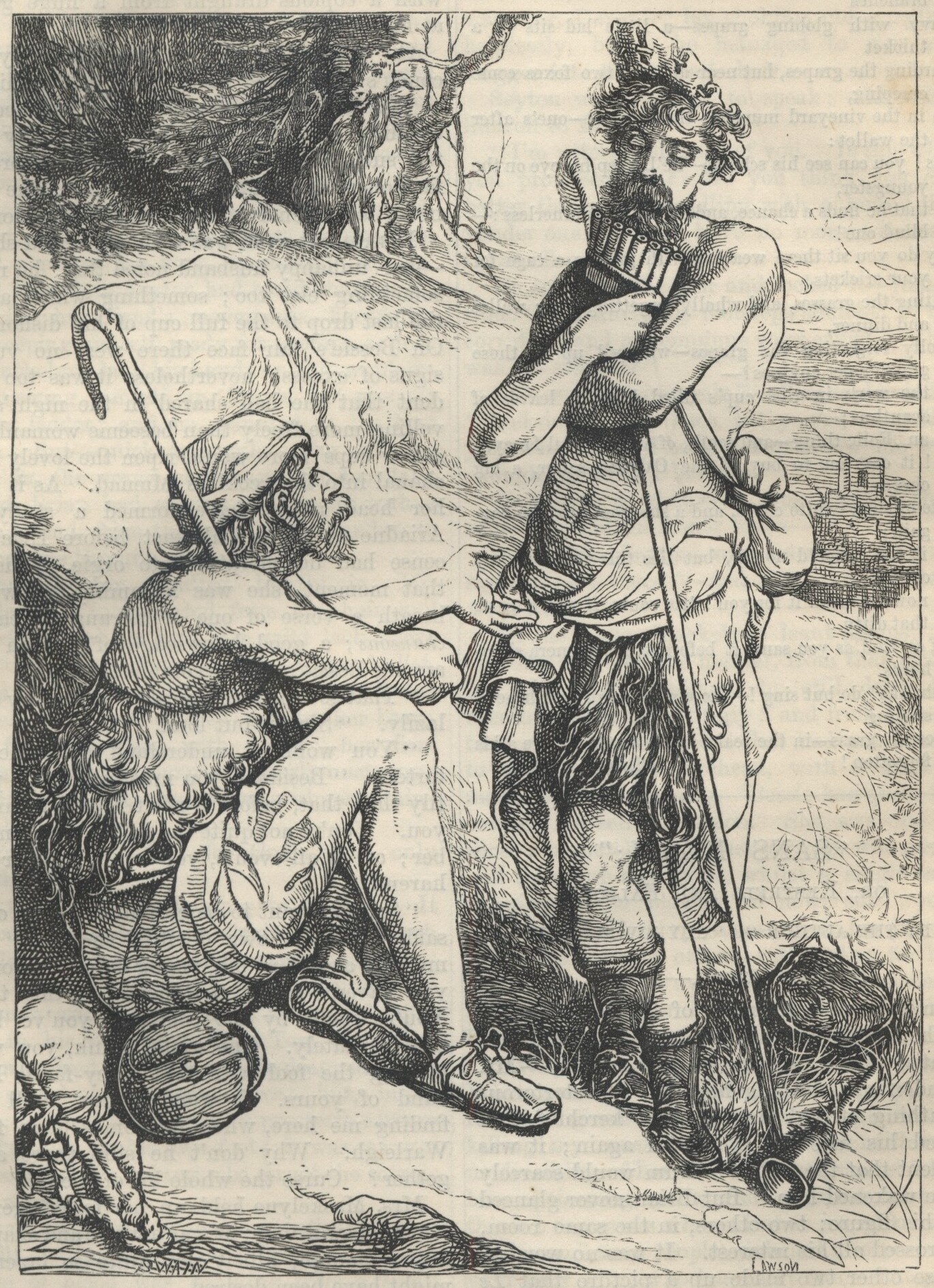
Engraving of a scene from Idyll I: Once a Week, 24 Feb. 1866

== See also ==
- Eclogue 5
- Eclogue 10

== Sources ==
- "The Theocritus Cup". Royal Collection Trust.

Attribution:

- Edmonds, J. M., ed. (1919). The Greek Bucolic Poets (3rd ed.). William Heinemann. pp. 6–23.
- Lang, Andrew, ed. (1880). Theocritus, Bion, and Moschus. London: Macmillan and Co. pp. 1–7.
