= Idyll XXI =

Poem attributed to Theocritus

Idyll XXI, also called Ἁλιεῖς ('The Fisherman'), is a poem traditionally attributed to the 3rd century BC Greek poet Theocritus. After some verses addressed to Diophantus, a friend about whom nothing is known, the poet describes the toilsome life of two old fishermen. One of them has dreamed of catching a golden fish, and has sworn, in his dream, never again to tempt the sea. The other reminds him that his oath is as empty as his vision, and that he must angle for common fish, if he is not starve among his golden dreams.

== Summary ==
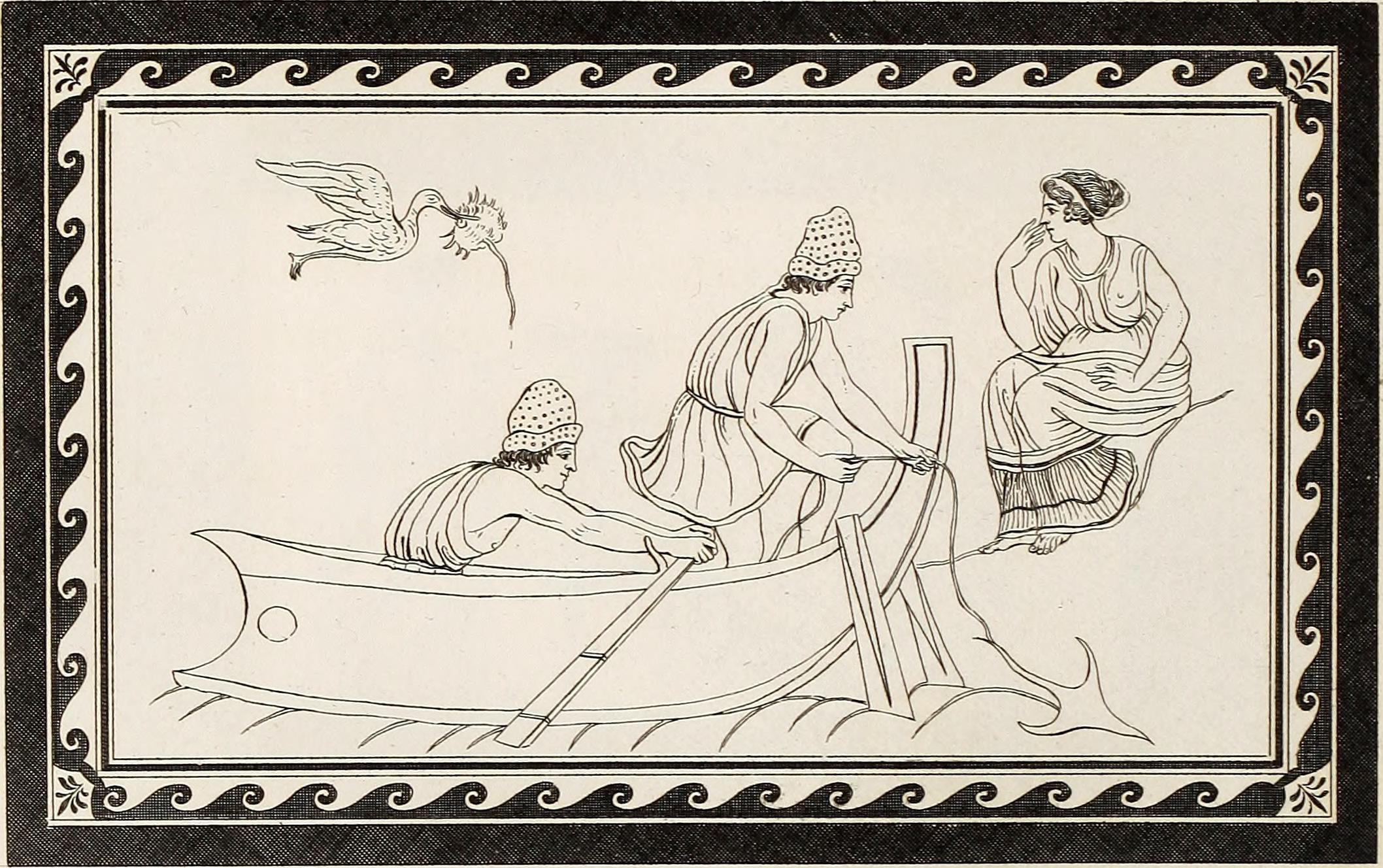
Engraving after an antique vase from the collection of Sir William Hamilton, 1804. Subject unknown

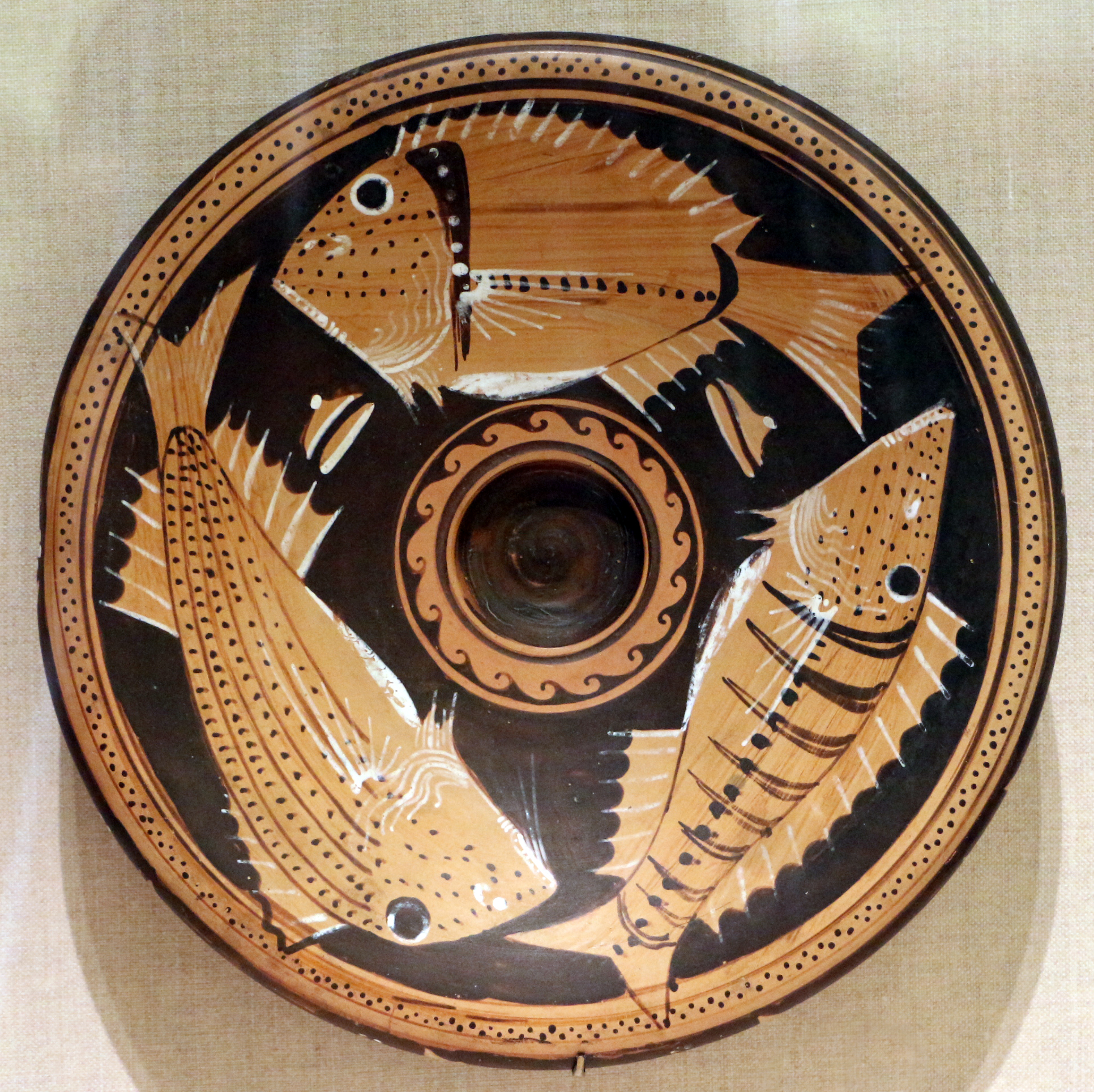
Fish plate from southern Italy: c. 340–330 BC

The poet begins with a dedication in the manner of Idyll XI, and passes quickly to his story. Two fishermen lie awake at night in their cabin on the shore, and one of them tells a dream he has just had of the catching of a golden fish. He asks his friend what the dream may mean, for he fears he may have to break his dream-oath that he would be a fisherman no longer. To this the friend replies that it was no oath he took, and that the moral of the dream is that his only wealth is the sea.

== Analysis ==
Many considerations go to show that the traditional ascription of the poem to Theocritus is mistaken. Andrew Lang thinks the idyll is "corrupt beyond hope of certain correction".

== Sources ==
- Cholmeley, R. J., ed. (1919). The Idylls of Theocritus (2nd ed.). London: G. Bell & Sons, Ltd. pp. 54–5, 329–34.
- Gow, A. S. F., ed. (1950). Theocritus. Vol. 2. Cambridge: Cambridge University Press. pp. 369–81.

Attribution:

- Edmonds, J. M., ed. (1919). The Greek Bucolic Poets (3rd ed.). William Heinemann. pp. 245–53.
- Lang, Andrew, ed. (1880). Theocritus, Bion, and Moschus. London: Macmillan and Co. pp. 99–102.
