= Eclogue 7 =

Poem by Virgil

Eclogue 7 (Ecloga VII; Bucolica VII) is a poem by the Latin poet Virgil, one of his book of ten pastoral poems known as the Eclogues. It is an amoebaean poem in which a herdsman Meliboeus recounts a contest between the shepherd Thyrsis and the goatherd Corydon.

The poem is imitated from the sixth Idyll of Theocritus. J. B. Greenough thinks the scene is apparently laid in the pastoral region of North Italy. The date assigned to the poem is 38 BC.

In the chiastic structure of the Eclogues, Eclogue 7 is paired with Eclogue 3, which also recounts an amoebaean contest between two herdsmen. The two contests have the same number of lines, but with a different arrangement. In Eclogue 3 the contest has 12 rounds, with each contestant singing two lines in a round; in Eclogue 7 the contest has 6 rounds, with each contestant singing 4 lines in a round. The contest in Eclogue 3 ended in a draw, while in Eclogue 7 Corydon is declared the winner.

== Summary ==
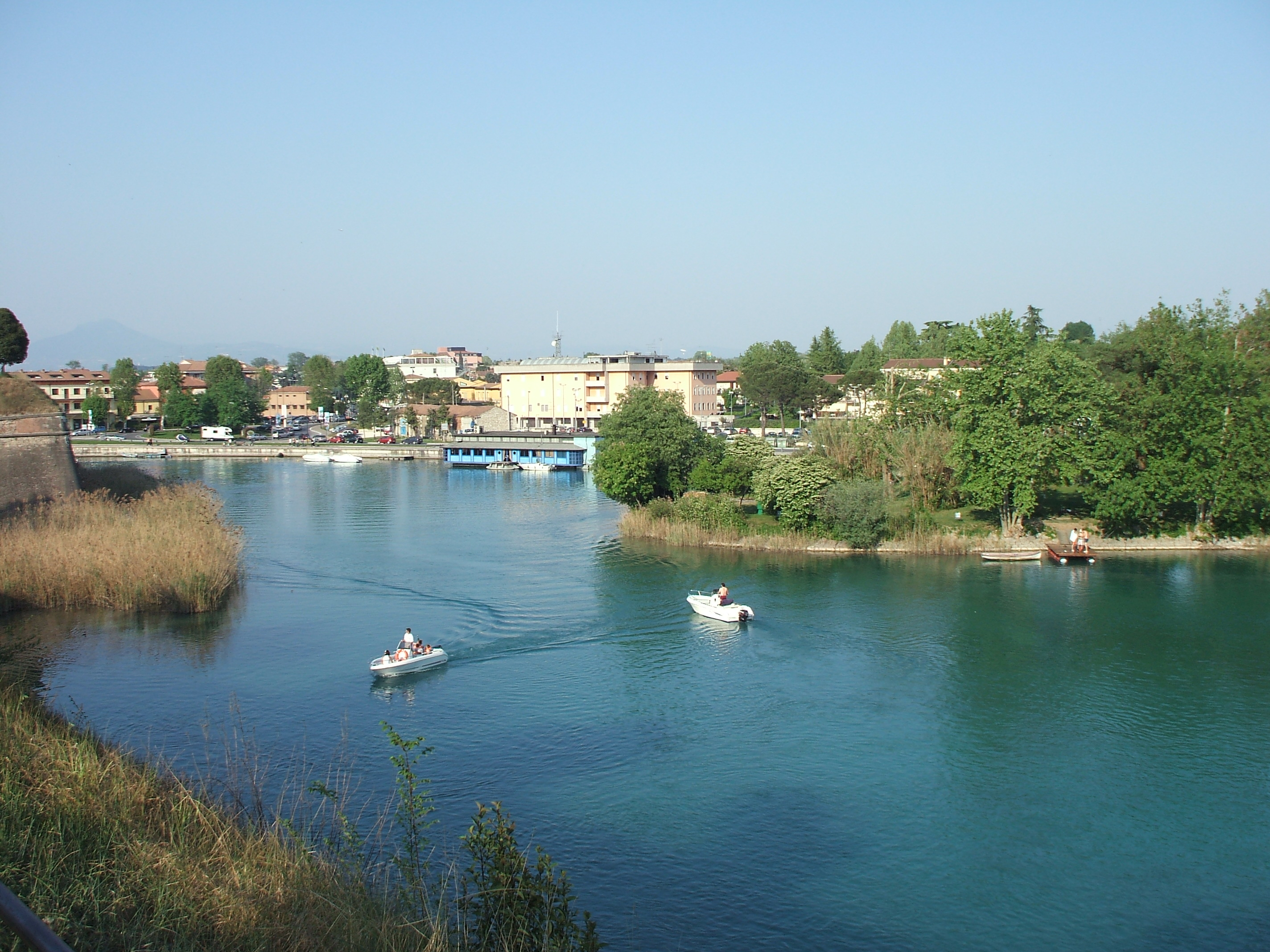
The Mincio at Peschiera del Garda

A herdsman Meliboeus recounts how, when following an errant goat, he came across Daphnis sitting beneath a tree, along with a goatherd Corydon and a shepherd Thyrsis, by the river Mincius. The two young men are described as Arcades ambo 'Arcadians both'. Daphnis encourages him to sit down and listen to a certamen magnum ('great contest') which is about to take place between the two young herdsmen. Meliboeus agrees despite the fact that Alcippe or Phyllis are not around to help look after his lambs.

- Corydon opens the contest by asking the "Libethridan nymphs" (i.e. the Muses) to help him make a song as good as they gave to Codrus; if he fails he will hang up his pipes on a sacred pine. Thyrsis responds by boastfully asking the Arcadian herdsmen to crown their growing poet's head with ivy so that Codrus may split his sides with envy; or if Codrus praises his song excessively, they should wreathe his brow with cyclamen, to avert the evil eye from the future divinely inspired prophet.

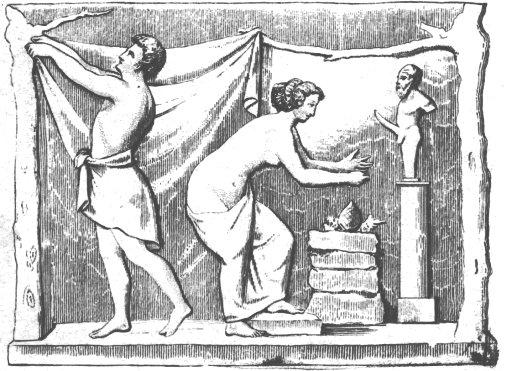
Invocation to Priapus: 19th-century engraving of a purported bas-relief from Pompeii (cf. ll. 33–6)

- Corydon says that "little Micon" dedicates a boar's head and a stag's antlers to Delia (i.e. Diana, the virgin goddess of hunting), but promises her a marble statue if she receives his gift favourably. Thyrsis responds by promising a bowl of milk and some honey cakes each year to Priapus (the fertility god) and says has already made him a marble statue which he will exchange for a gold one if the herds give birth successfully.
- Corydon addresses the sea-nymph Galatea, "sweeter than the thyme of Hybla" (a mountain in Sicily, famous for its bees), "whiter than swans, more beautiful than white ivy", and begs her to come to him as soon as the bulls have returned home to their byre. Thyrsis also addresses Galatea (without naming her), wishing that he may seem to her "more bitter than Sardinian herbs, pricklier than butcher's broom, more worthless than washed up seaweed", if this day has not been longer for him than a year, and he orders the bullocks to return home.

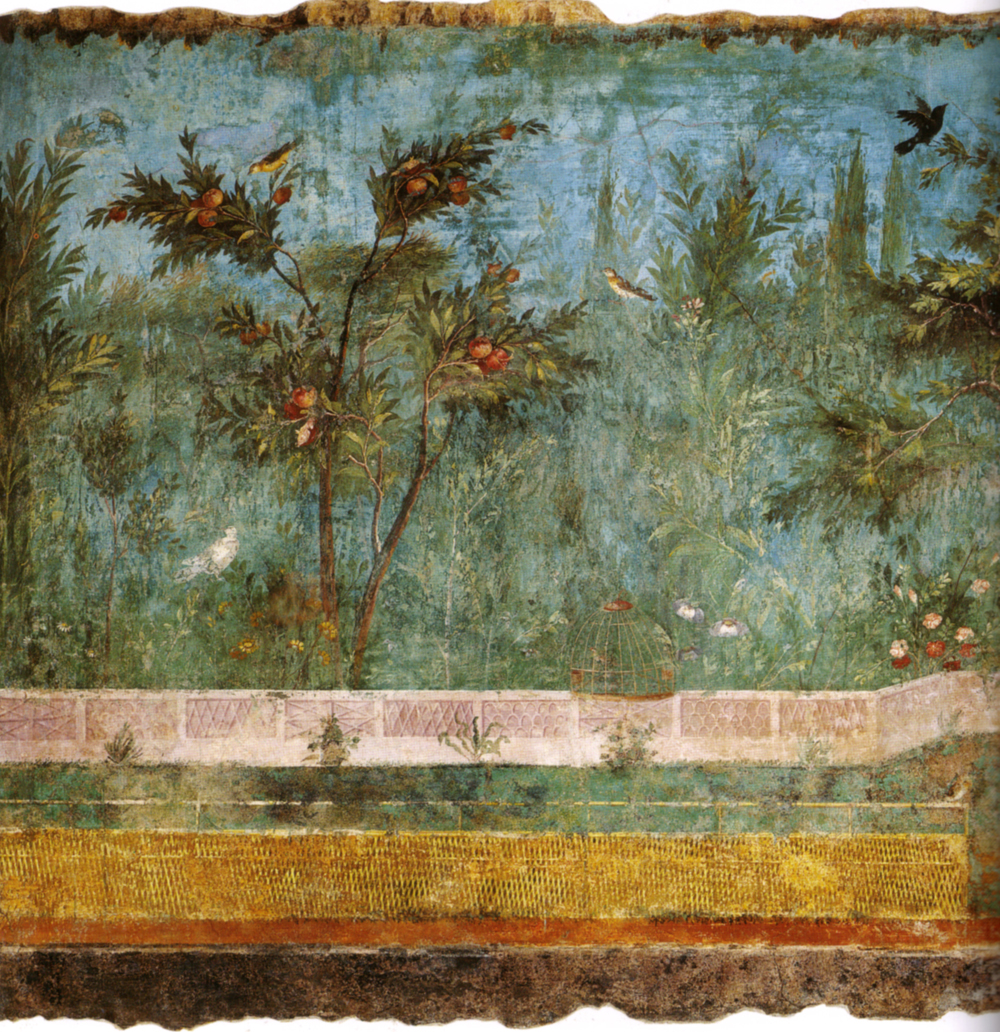
Trees painted on the wall of Livia's villa near Rome, contemporary with this poem

- Corydon requests the springs, grass, and the shade of the arbutus tree to protect the cattle from the heat of summer; he describes the buds swelling on the vine. Thyrsis replies by describing a hearth, torches, a constant fire, doorposts black with soot; outside are the north wind, wolves harassing sheep, and torrential rivers.
- Corydon describes the fruit of junipers and chestnuts strewing the ground in autumn, a lovely time of year; but if the handsome Alexis were to depart, the rivers would dry up. Thyrsis in reply describes the grass dried up and dying, and vines providing too little shade; but if Phyllis comes rain will fall and everything will become green.
- Corydon says the poplar, the vine, the myrtle, and the bay tree are all the favourites of different gods; but as long as Phyllis loves hazels, then myrtles and bay trees will take second place. Thyrsis replies that ash tree, pine, poplar and fir are all beautiful in their different locations; but if the handsome Lycidas were to visit him more often, the ash and pine would yield their places to him.

At the end Meliboeus reports that Thyrsis contended in vain, and from then on Corydon was regarded as the champion singer.

== Characters ==
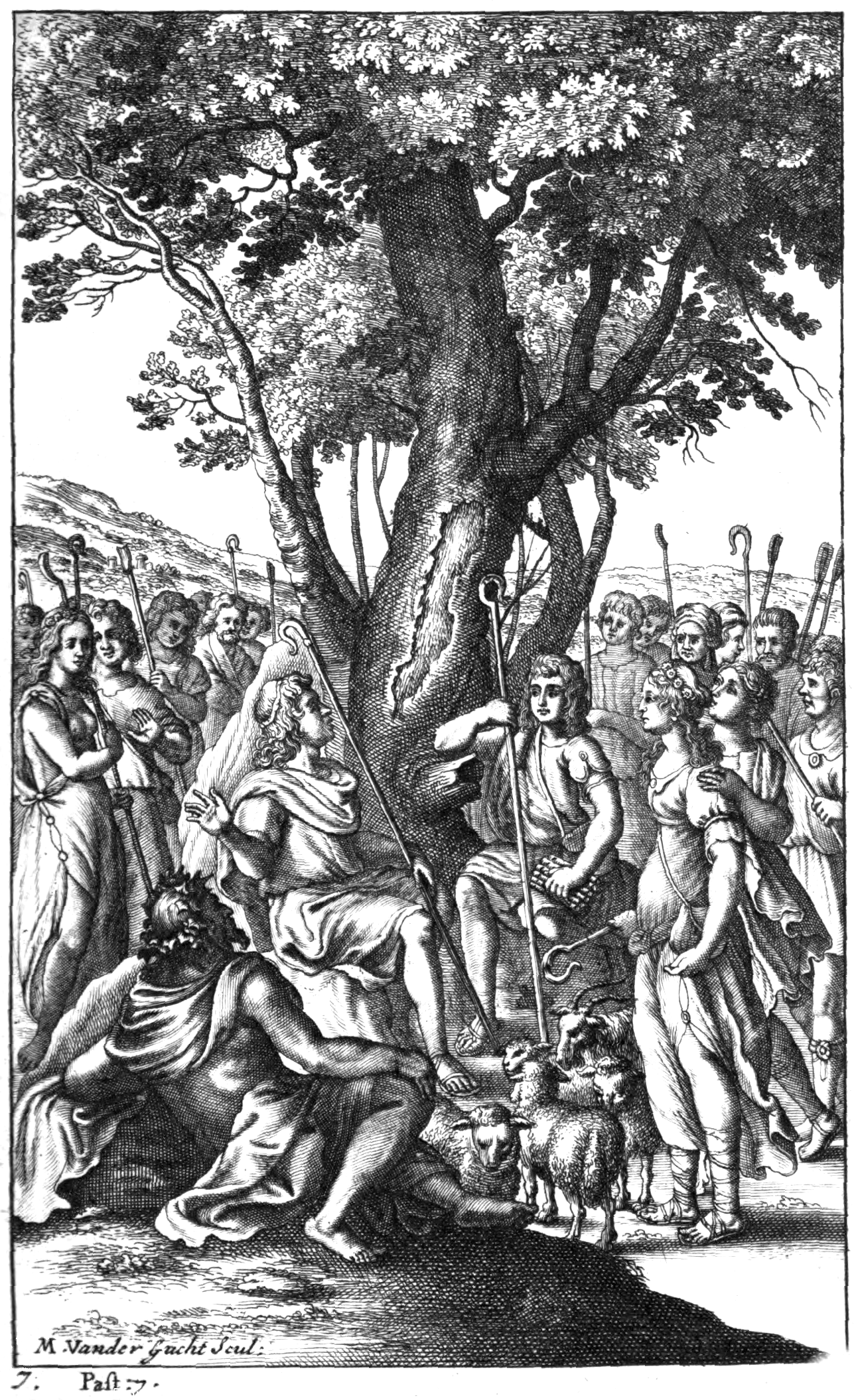
Engraving for Dryden's Virgil, 1709: "Beneath a Holm, repair'd two jolly Swains"

It was common for Servius and other ancient commentators to propose that the various characters mentioned in the Eclogues may also represent real persons or fellow poets in Virgil's circle in Rome; thus the character Menalcas in Eclogues 3, 5, 9, and 10 was thought to represent Virgil himself. Sometimes modern critics also make such identifications. For example, according to a theory by Rostagni, "Codrus", whom Corydon refers to as "my Codrus, (who) makes poems next to those of Phoebus himself", may be a pseudonym for Messalla. Robin Nisbet (1995) found Rostagni's theory "convincing", though Savage (1963) found it "not convincing", taking the view that Codrus (the name of an ancient king) is a pseudonym for Gaius Maecenas (who claimed descent from kings). Codrus is also mentioned in 5.11, where Menalcas suggests to Mopsus that he should sing "praises of Alcon or criticisms of Codrus", suggesting that Codrus was a controversial figure.

Savage (1963) suggests other identifications in the eclogue, for example, Daphnis = Octavian, Corydon = the poet Domitius Marsus, Thyrsis = Horace, Phyllis = Octavian's wife Livia, Galatea = Sextus Pompeius, and so on. Savage's identifications in some cases assume a later date for the eclogues than is generally accepted. However, most more recent scholars have not supported his identifications and they view Eclogue 7 "as a poem about poetry, not about contemporary history and politics".

Some of the characters occur in more than one Eclogue. Thus the narrator Meliboeus is found in Eclogue 1 as the unfortunate farmer who has been thrown off his land by a soldier; in Eclogue 3 he is the owner of a flock of sheep; here he is tending both sheep and goats. According to Eclogue 1.71 he appears to be a full citizen, not a slave. Unlike other herdsmen he appears to have no love interest, either male or female.

The goatherd Corydon also occurs in Eclogue 2, and there are clear connections between the two Corydons: both sing in praise of the boy Alexis, both love hunting, and in both poems Corydon imitates parts of Theocritus's Idyll 11 (the song to Galatea). Although Corydon and Thyrsis are described as "Arcadian", this is presumably a poetic term indicative of their ability in singing, since the scene is set near the river Mincius in northern Italy. It has been noted that both the name "Corydon" and the phrase "Arcadians both", as well as certain other details in the poem, seem to derive from an epigram by a certain Erucius in the Palatine Anthology (6.96).

Thyrsis is not mentioned elsewhere in Virgil, but the name occurs in Theocritus (he is the Sicilian goatherd who opens the whole book). The names Meliboeus, Alexis, Phyllis, and Codrus are not found in Theocritus and appear to be characters invented by Virgil. Phyllis is mentioned in Eclogues 3, 5, 7, and 10, always as a desirable character, and appears to be portrayed as the village beauty.

== Corydon's victory ==
Many critics have discussed why Thyrsis loses the contest. One common observation is that Corydon is more positive, mentioning pleasant images such as thyme, mossy springs, autumn fruit and so on, while Thyrsis is aggressive and negative, using images such as bitter herbs, winter cold, and dried up grass. Fantazzi and Querbach (1985) give a detailed analysis of each round, pointing out how, in the last round, for example, Corydon chooses euphonious names of trees and includes the names of four gods; whereas although Thyrsis matches the Corydon's pattern skilfully, his four ablative plural words ending in -īs, -īs, -īs, -īs, combined with words containing more than one s like fraxinus and revīsās, introduce an unwelcome hissing sound, and he says nothing about the gods.

Paraskeviotis notes that in this Eclogue, Virgil imitates Theocritus's Idyll 5, in which the goatherd Comatas who begins the contest also wins an unexpected victory. The final line, however ("from that time Corydon is Corydon for us") recalls the end of Idyll 8 ("from that time Daphnis became first among the herdsmen"), thus equating Corydon with the legendary founder of bucolic poetry. In Paraskeviotis's view, in the victory of Corydon over Thyrsis, Virgil was claiming his own superiority to Theocritus. Cucchiarelli (2011) also sees Corydon as Virgil's champion and Thyrsis as Theocritean.

== Apollo and Dionysus ==
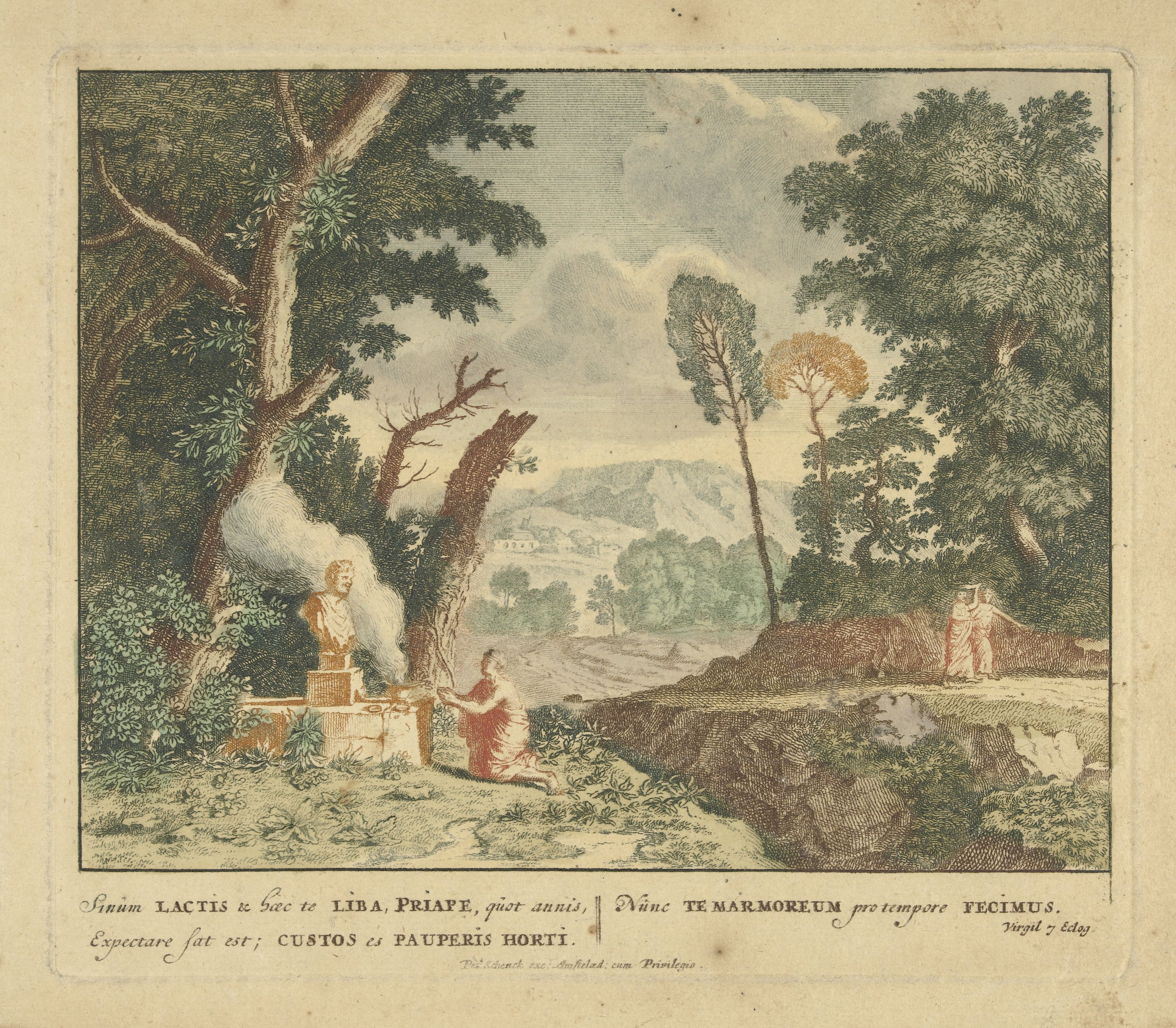
Print by Jan van Call I illustrating Eclogue 7, 33–34

It has been argued by Cucchiarelli (2011) that Corydon and Thyrsis also differ in their association with different gods. Corydon begins by praising the Muses and Phoebus (= Apollo, god of poetry) and goes on to address Delia (= Diana, Apollo's sister), thus associating himself with Apollo; while Thyrsis, by calling for a wreathe of ivy (associated with Bacchus, the god of wine), and addressing Priapus (son of Bacchus), connects himself with Bacchus (= Dionysus). His name Thyrsis also recalls the Greek word thyrsos, a kind of wand used in Dionysiac rites.

Symbolically, Cucchiarelli argues, these gods can be seen as representing the two major political figures of the age, Octavian and Mark Antony, and their respective parties. Already in 41 BC Antony was being worshipped in Ephesos as a second Dionysus, while Octavian came to be increasingly associated with Apollo. In Eclogue 4, dated 40 BC, the balance between the symbolism of the two gods can be seen to represent the equilibrium between the two parties achieved at that time (see Second Triumvirate).

In lines 61–2 of Eclogue 7, in the last round of the contest, Corydon also balances the gods, those representing Antony (who claimed descent from Hercules), and those representing Octavian (who claimed descent from Venus):

The poplar is most pleasing to Alcides (= Hercules), the vine to Iacchus (= Bacchus/Dionysus),
the myrtle to beautiful Venus, and his own bay-tree to Phoebus (= Apollo).

Thyrsis in his reply, however, does not mention any gods, which may be counted as another reason he failed to win the contest.

== Gallery ==
Woodcuts by Aristide Maillol (1926), illustrating Eclogue 7

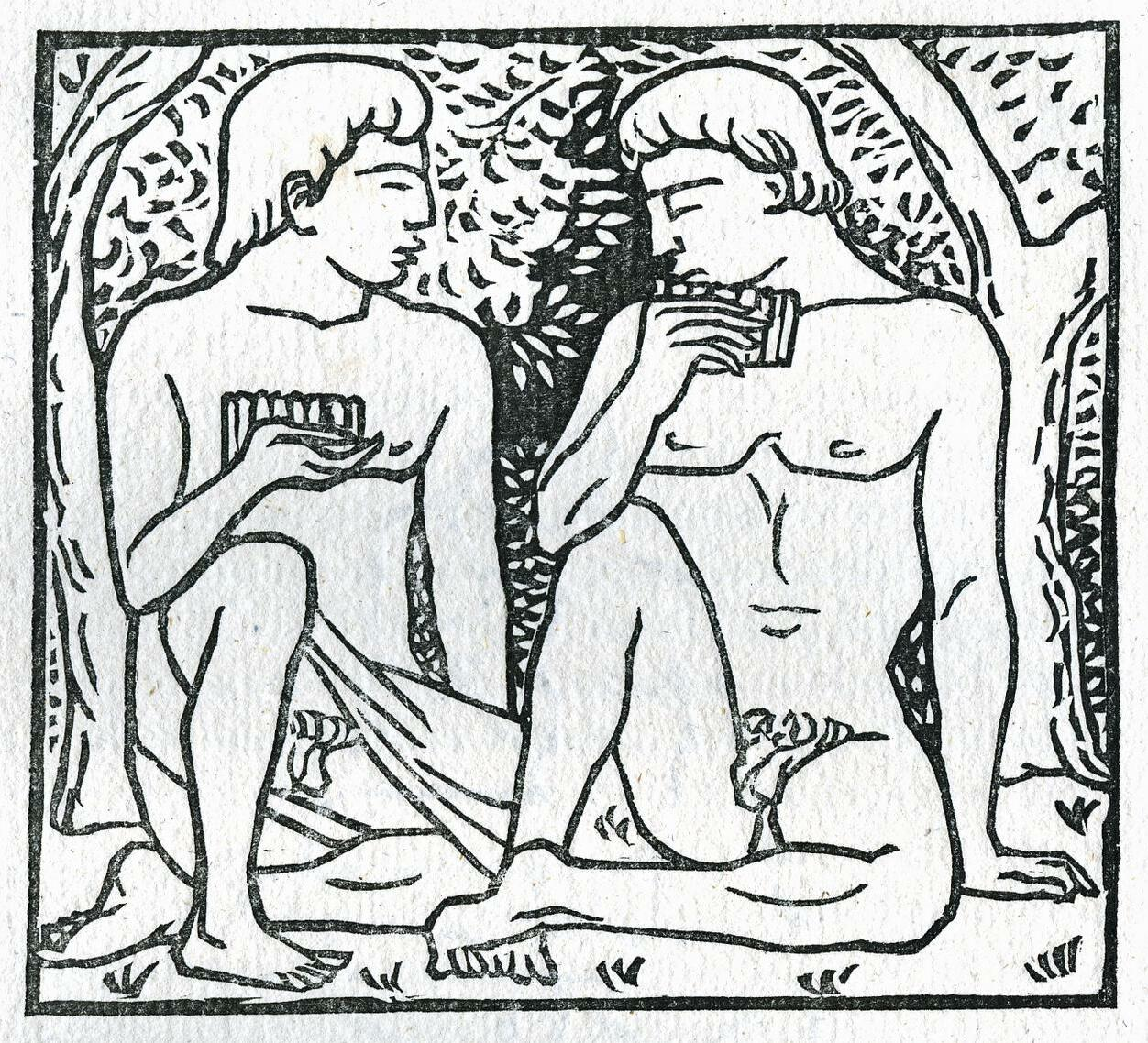

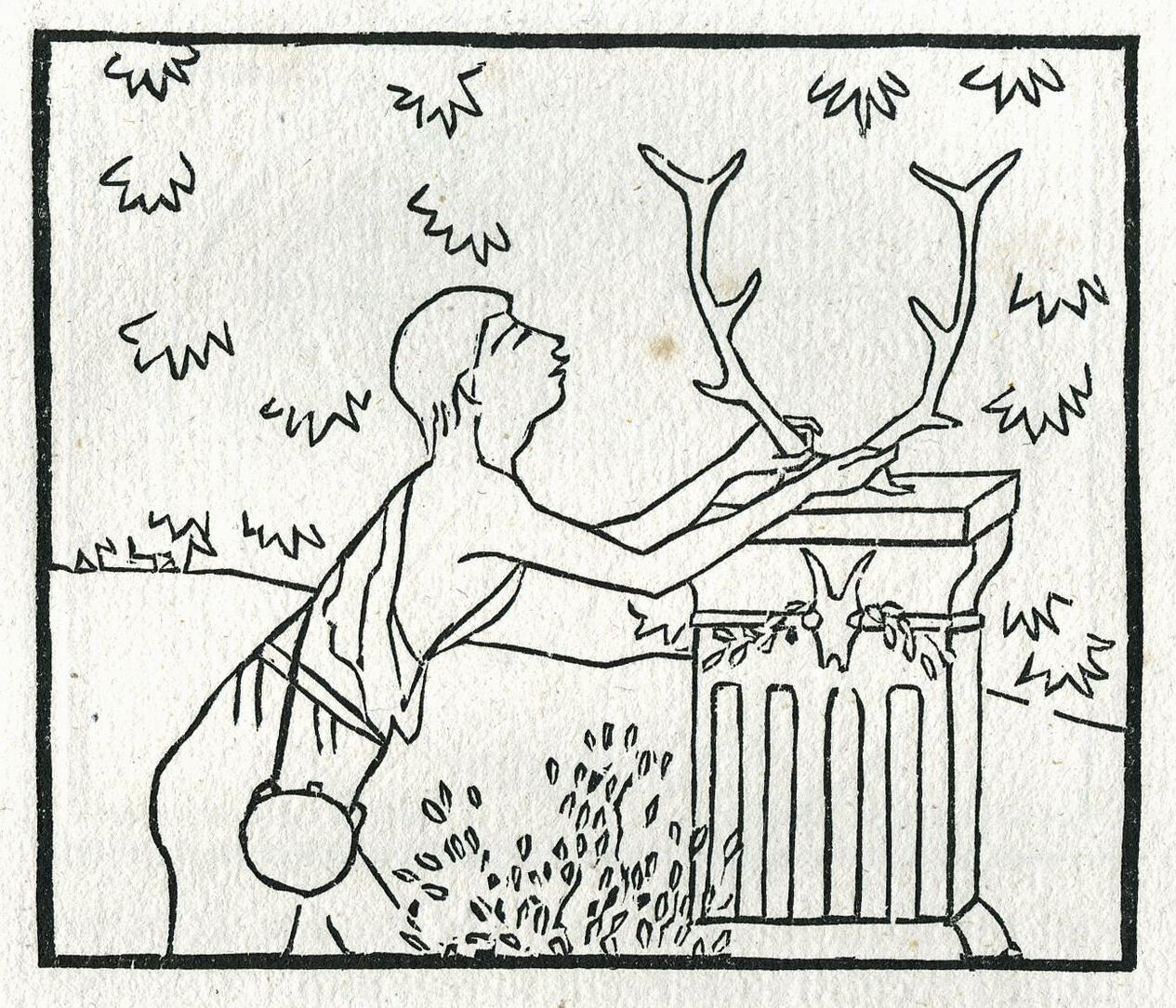

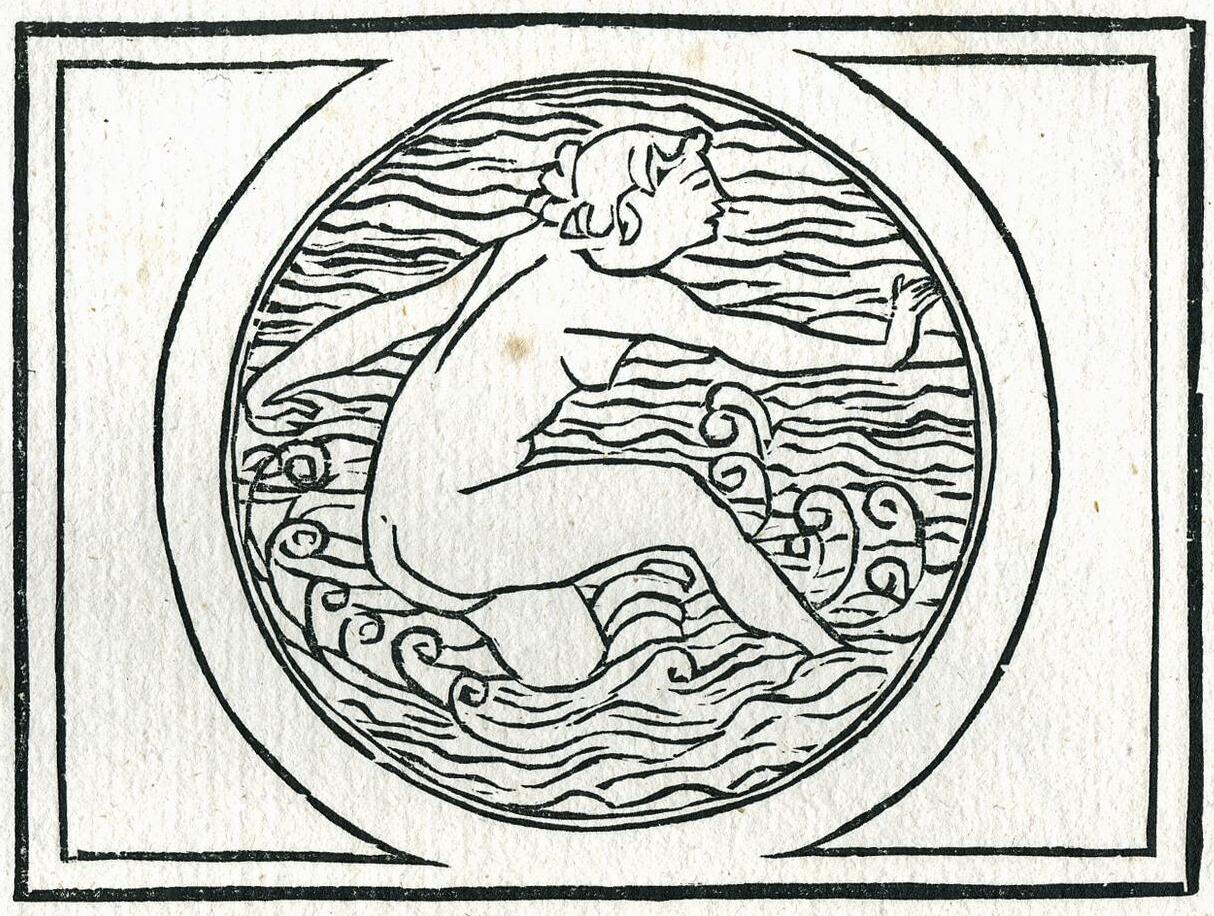

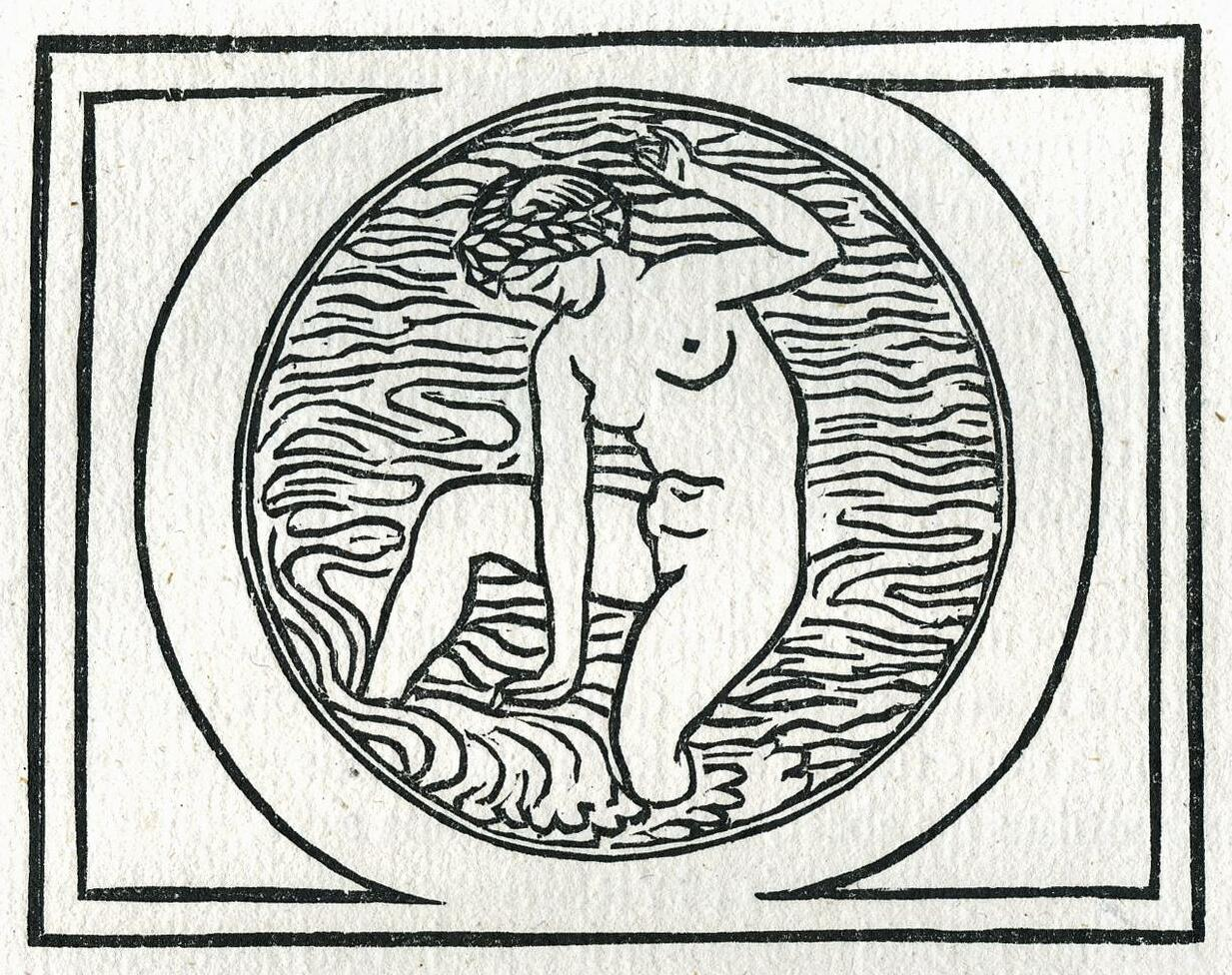

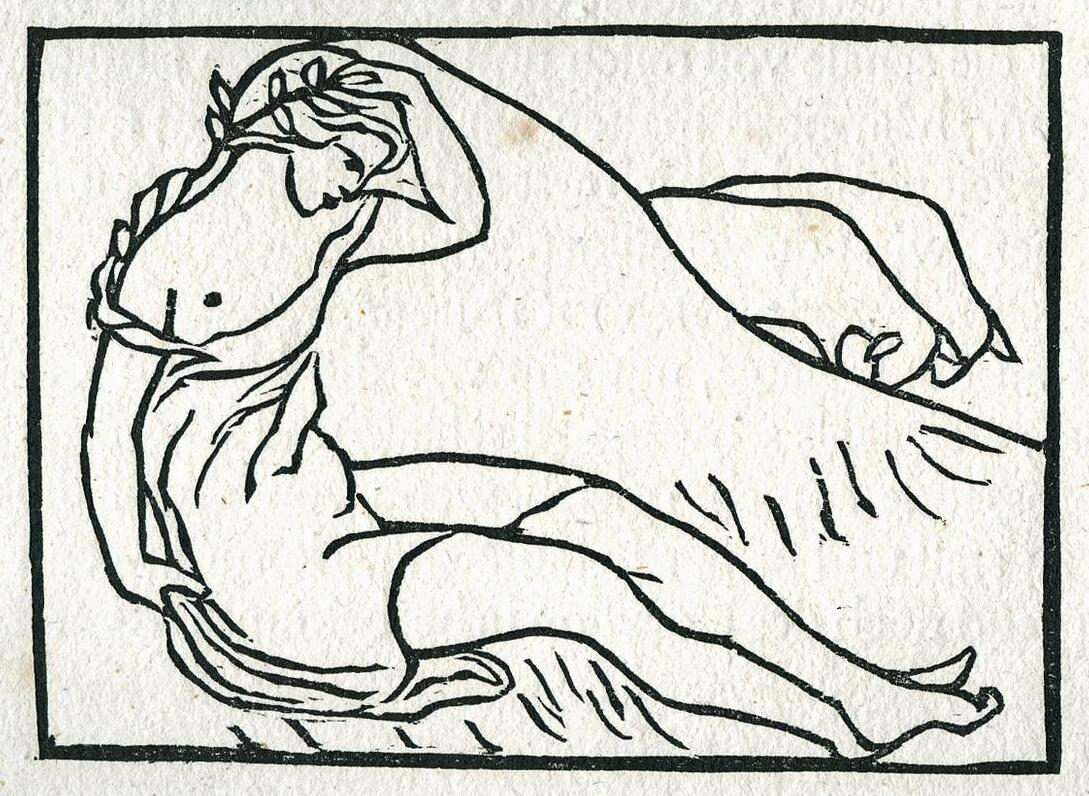

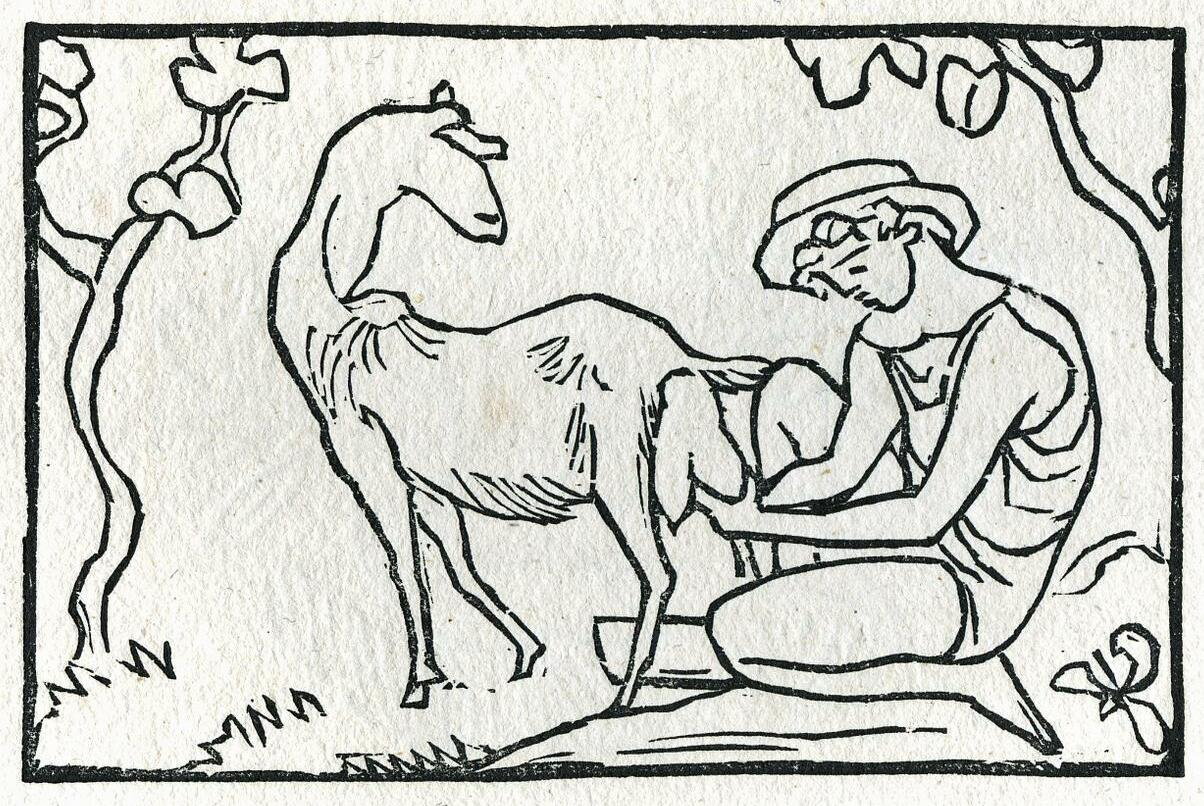

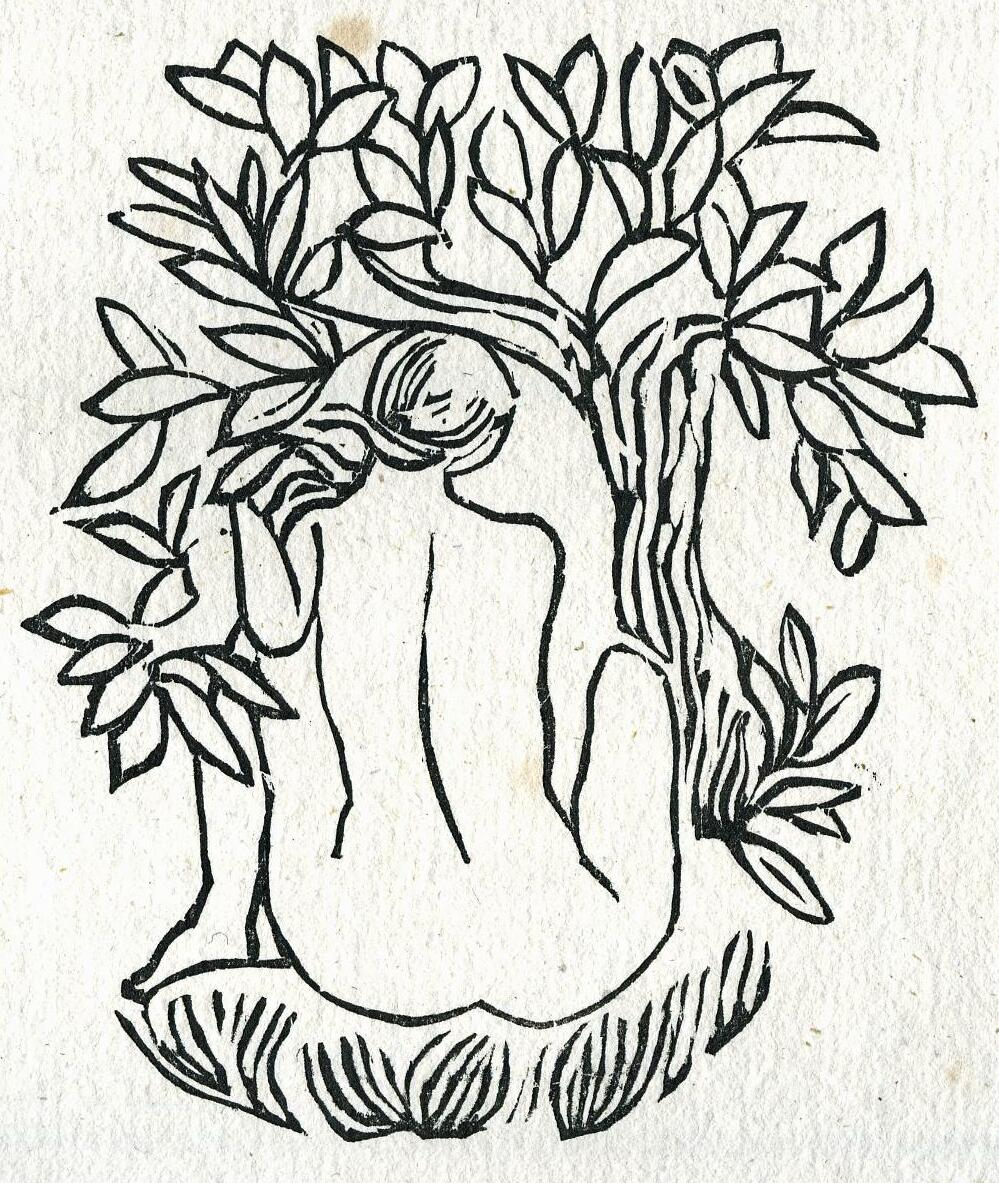

== Sources and further reading ==
- Cucchiarelli, A. (2011). "Ivy and Laurel: Divine Models in Virgil's Eclogues". Harvard Studies in Classical Philology, Vol. 106 (2011), pp. 155–178.
- Dance, C. M. X. (2014). Literary Laughter in Augustan Poetry: Vergil, Horace, and Ovid. Columbia University PhD thesis
- Eckerman, C. (2015). "Thyrsis' Arcadian Shepherd in Virgil's Seventh Eclogue". The Classical Quarterly, New Series, Vol. 65, No. 2 (DECEMBER 2015), pp. 669–672.
- Egan, R. B. (1996). "Corydon's Winning Words in Eclogue 7". Phoenix, Vol. 50, No. 3/4 (Autumn - Winter, 1996).
- Fantazzi, C; Querbach, C. W. (1985). "Sound and Substance: A Reading of Virgil's Seventh Eclogue". Phoenix, Vol. 39, No. 4 (Winter, 1985), pp. 355–367.
- Flintoff, T. E. S. (March 1976), Characterisation in Virgil's Eclogues: A Lecture to the Virgil Society (PDF), pp. 16–26
- Greenough, J. B., ed. (1883). Publi Vergili Maronis: Bucolica. Aeneis. Georgica. The Greater Poems of Virgil. Vol. 1. Boston, MA: Ginn, Heath, & Co. pp. 19–21. (Public domain)
- Kennedy, D. F. (1987). "Arcades ambo: Virgil, Gallus and Arcadia". Hermathena, No. 143, In honor of D. E. W. Wormell (Winter 1987), pp. 47–59.
- Moch, K. E. (2017). "Certamen Magnum: Competition and Song Exchange in Vergil’s Eclogues". Vergilius (1959–), 63, 63–92.
- Nethercut, W. R. (1968). "Vergil and Horace in Bucolic 7". The Classical World, Vol. 62, No. 3 (Nov., 1968), pp. 93–96+98
- Nisbet, R. G. (1995). "Review of WV Clausen, A Commentary on Virgil, Eclogues". The Journal of Roman Studies, 85, 320–321.
- Page, T. E., ed. (1898). P. Vergili Maronis: Bucolica et Georgica. Classical Series. London: Macmillan & Co., Ltd. pp. 148–55. (Public domain)
- Paraskeviotis, G. C. (2014). "Eclogue 7, 69–70. Vergil's Victory over Theocritus". Rivista di cultura classica e medioevale, 265–271.
- Savage, J. J. H. (1963). "The Art of the Seventh Eclogue of Vergil". Transactions and Proceedings of the American Philological Association, Vol. 94 (1963), pp. 248–267.
- Starr, Raymond J. (1995). "Vergil's Seventh Eclogue and Its Readers: Biographical Allegory as an Interpretative Strategy in Antiquity and Late Antiquity". Classical Philology. 90 (2): 129–38. doi:10.1086/367454. JSTOR 270486.
- Sullivan, M. B. (2002). "Et eris mihi magnus Apollo: Divine and Earthly Competition in Virgil's Seventh Eclogue". Vergilius (1959–), Vol. 48 (2002), pp. 40–54.
- Waite S.V. F. (1972). "The Contest in Vergil's Seventh Eclogue". Classical Philology, Vol. 67, No. 2 (Apr., 1972), pp. 121–123.
