= Nicias (disambiguation) =

Nicias (c. 470–413 BC) was an Athenian politician and general during the Peloponnesian War. The name may also refer to:

- Nicias (Indo-Greek king) (r. 90–85 BC), Indo-Greek king in modern-day Pakistan
- Nicias of Kos (died c. 20 BC), Greek tyrant of the island of Kos
- Nicias of Miletus (4th–3rd century BC), ancient Greek physician and epigrammatist
- Nicias (beetle) (Nicias alurnoides), a genus of beetles in the family Cerambycidae
