= Idyll IX =

Poem by Theocritus

Idyll IX, also titled Βουκολιασταί γʹ ('The Third Country Singing-Match'), is a bucolic poem by the 3rd-century BC Greek poet Theocritus. Daphnis and Menalcas, at the bidding of the poet, sing the joys of the neatherds and of the shepherds life. Both receive the thanks of the poet, and rustic prizes—a staff and a horn, made of a spiral shell.

== Summary ==
The characters are two neatherds, Daphnis and Menalcas, and the writer himself. We are to imagine the cattle to have just been driven out to pasture. There is no challenge and no stake. At the request of the writer that they shall compete in song before him, each of the herdsmen sings seven lines, Daphnis setting the theme; and then the writer, leaving it to be implied that he judged them equal, tells us how he gave them each a gift and what it was. The writer now appeals to the Muses to tell him the song he himself sang on the occasion, and he sings a six-line song in their praise.

== Analysis ==
J. M. Edmonds thinks this poem "would seem to be merely a poor imitation of the last" (Idyll VIII). Doubts have been expressed as to the authenticity of the prelude and concluding verses.

== See also ==
- Idyll VI

== Sources ==
Attribution:

- Edmonds, J. M., ed. (1919). The Greek Bucolic Poets (3rd ed.). William Heinemann. pp. 123–7.
- Lang, Andrew, ed. (1880). Theocritus, Bion, and Moschus. London: Macmillan and Co. pp. 50–2.
