= Nicias of Miletus =

Greek doctor and poet (4th–3rd century BC)

Nicias of Miletus (Ancient Greek: Νικίας; 4th–3rd century BC) was an ancient Greek physician, poet and epigrammatist from Miletus. A confidant of Theocritus (see Idylls 11, 13 and 28), he devoted himself to poetry and eight epigrams ascribed to his name survive in a fragmentary state.

== Sources ==
- Pecz, Vilmos, ed. (1902–1904). "Nicias (6)". Ókori Lexicon I–II. Budapest: Franklin Publishing Co.
- "Nìcia di Mileto". Enciclopedia Italiana di Scienze, Lettere e Arti (online ed.). Treccani.
