= Idyll VIII =

Idyll VIII, also called Βουκολιασταί βʹ ('The Second Country Singing-Match'), is a bucolic poem by the 3rd-century BC Greek poet Theocritus.

== Summary ==
The characters of this dialogue are the mythical personages Daphnis a cowherd and Menalcas a shepherd, and an unnamed goatherd who plays umpire in their contest of song. After four lines by way of stage-direction, the conversation opens with mutual banter between the two young countrymen, and leads to a singing-match with pipes for the stakes. Each sings four alternate elegiac quatrains and an envoy of eight hexameters. In the first three pairs of quatrains Menalcas sets the theme and Daphnis takes it up. The first pair is addressed to the landscape; the remainder deal with love.

== Analysis ==
The scene is among the high mountain pastures of Sicily:

On the sward, at the cliff top
Lie strewn the white flocks;

and far below lies the Sicilian sea. Here Daphnis and Menalcas, two herdsmen of the golden age, meet, while still in their earliest youth, and contend for the prize of pastoral. Their songs, in elegiac measure, are variations on the themes of love and friendship (for Menalcas sings of Milon, Daphnis of Nais), and of nature. Daphnis is the winner; it is his earliest victory, and the prelude to his great renown among nymphs and shepherds.

== Transmission ==
The last pair of quatrains and the two envoys do not correspond in theme. The resemblance of most of the competing stanzas has caused both loss and transposition in the manuscripts. From metrical and linguistic considerations the poem is clearly not the work of Theocritus. Some critics take the poem to be a patchwork by various hands.

== See also ==
- Idyll VI
- Idyll IX

== Sources ==
Attribution:

- Edmonds, J. M., ed. (1919). The Greek Bucolic Poets (3rd ed.). William Heinemann. pp. 109–21.
- Lang, Andrew, ed. (1880). Theocritus, Bion, and Moschus. London: Macmillan and Co. pp. 44–9.
