= Idyll XIII =

Poem by Theocritus

Idyll XIII, sometimes called Ύλας ('Hylas'), is a bucolic poem by the 3rd-century BC Greek poet Theocritus. As in Idyll XI, Nicias is again addressed, by way of introduction to the story of Hylas. This beautiful lad, a favourite companion of Heracles, took part in the Quest of the Fleece of Gold. As he went to draw water from a fountain, the water-nymphs dragged him down to their home, and Heracles, after a long and vain search, was compelled to follow the heroes of the Quest on foot to Phasis.

== Summary ==
'The nymphs all clung to his hand, for love of the Argive lad had fluttered the soft hearts of all of them'

Theocritus offers a consolatio amoris to his friend the poet-physician Nicias of Miletus, with whom he studied under the physician Erasistratus. After a brief introduction by way of stage-direction, he tells him the song the Cyclops sang to his love the sea-nymph.

== Date ==
According to classicist J. M. Edmonds, metrical and grammatical considerations make it probable that the poem was an early one and it may well be anterior to Idyll XXVIII, "The Distaff".

== See also ==
- Calypso (mythology)
- Kouros

== Sources ==
- Mastronarde, D. J. (1968). "Theocritus' Idyll 13: Love and the Hero". Transactions and Proceedings of the American Philological Association. 99: 273–90. doi:10.2307/2935847. JSTOR 2935847.

Attribution:

- Edmonds, J. M., ed. (1919). The Greek Bucolic Poets (3rd ed.). William Heinemann. pp. xix, 139–47.
- Lang, Andrew, ed. (1880). Theocritus, Bion, and Moschus. London: Macmillan and Co. pp. 53–6.
