= Hamadryades =

Hamadryades may refer to:

- Hamadryad, a type of tree nymph in Ancient Greek mythology
- Hamadryades, a synonym for Nicias, a genus of beetles
