= Idyll XVIII =

Greek poem attributed to Theocritus

Idyll XVIII, also titled Ἑλένης Ἐπιθάλαμιος ('The Epithalamy of Helen'), is a poem by the 3rd-century BC Greek poet Theocritus. The poem includes a re-creation of the epithalamium sung by a choir of maidens at the marriage of Helen and Menelaus of Sparta. The idea is said to have been borrowed from an old poem by Stesichorus.

== Analysis ==
'Then sang they all in harmony, beating time with woven paces, and the house rang round with the bridal song'

This is a short Epic piece of the same type as XIII. Both begin, as do XXV and Bion II, with a phrase suggesting that they are consequent upon something previous; but according to Edmonds this conceit, like the ergo or igitur of Propertius and Ovid, is no more than a recognised way of beginning a short poem. The introduction, unlike that of XIII, contains no dedication.

The scholia tells that Theocritus here imitates certain passages of Stesichorus' first Epithalamy of Helen. The text likely contains allusions to certain passages from lost works by Sappho, and Edmonds thinks Theocritus "seems to have had Sappho's book of Wedding-Songs before him" when writing this poem.

Lang thinks this epithalamium may have been written for the wedding of a friend of the poet's. The epithalamium, chanted at night by a chorus of girls, outside the bridal chamber, was a traditional feature of weddings. Compare the conclusion of the hymn of Adonis in XV.

== See also ==
- Epithalamium
- Epyllion
- Sappho 44
- Marriage in ancient Greece

== Sources ==
- Hopkinson, Neil, ed. (2015). Theocritus. Moschus. Bion. LCL 28. Cambridge, MA: Harvard University Press. pp. 258–67.

Attribution:

- Edmonds, J. M., ed. (1919). The Greek Bucolic Poets (3rd ed.). William Heinemann. pp. 223–31.
- Lang, Andrew, ed. (1880). Theocritus, Bion, and Moschus. London: Macmillan and Co. pp. 92–4.
