= Eclogue 2 =

Pastoral poem by the Latin poet Virgil

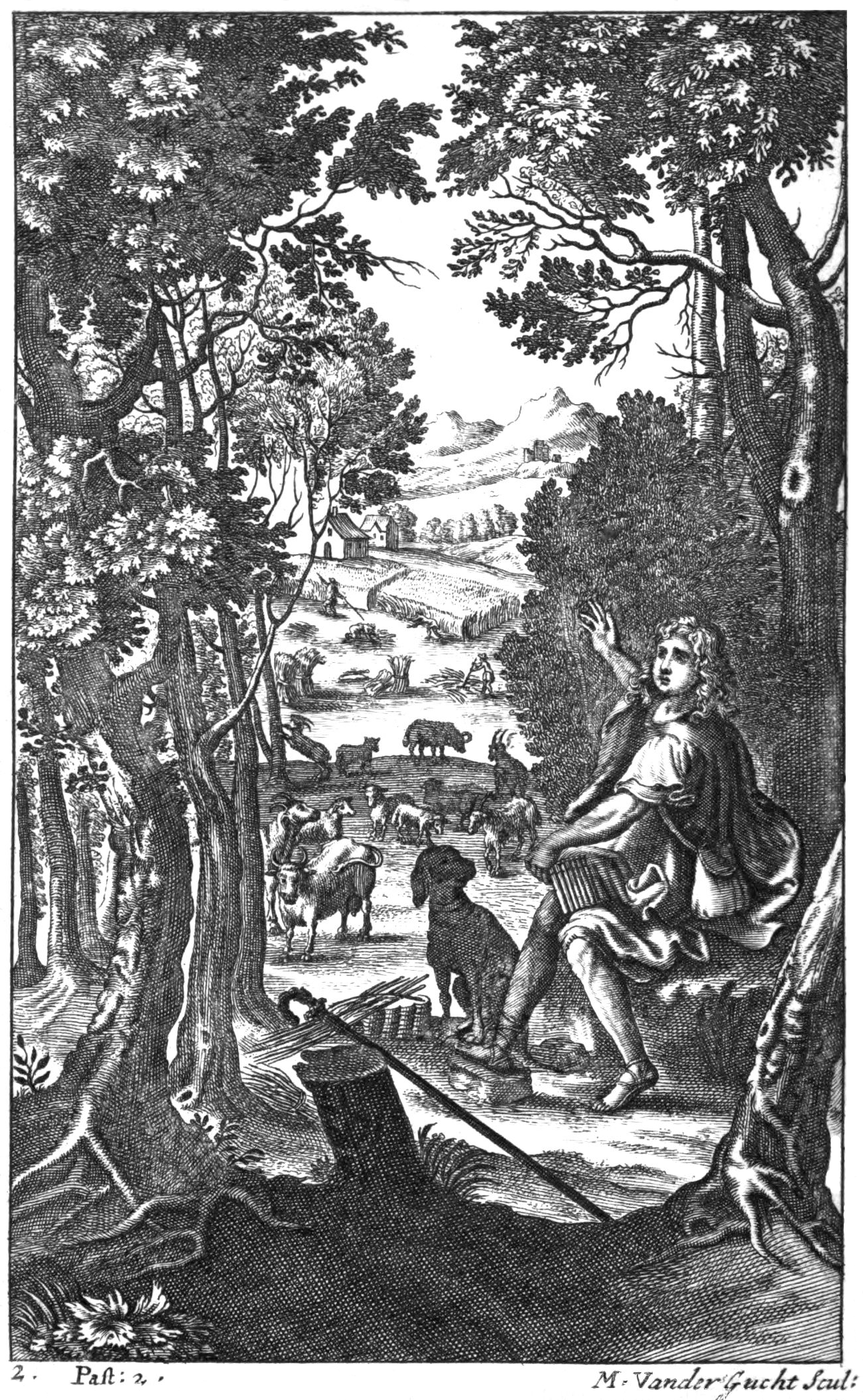
Engraving of Pastoral 2: Dryden's Virgil, 1709

Eclogue 2 (Ecloga II; Bucolica II) is a pastoral poem by the Latin poet Virgil, one of a series of ten poems known as the Eclogues. In this Eclogue the herdsman Corydon laments his inability to win the affections of the young Alexis. It is an imitation of the eleventh Idyll of Theocritus, in which the Cyclops Polyphemus laments the cruelty of the sea-nymph Galatea. After a 5-line introduction, the rest of the poem consists of a single speech by Corydon. The poem has 73 lines, and is written in the dactylic hexameter metre.

Eclogues 2 and 3 are thought to be the earliest of Virgil's Eclogues to be written, and so the poem dates to about 42 BC.

== Summary ==
The subject of this poem is the complaint of a herder of sheep and goats, Corydon, who is in love with a handsome blond boy Alexis. Alexis, however, is the delicias domini ('boss's darling') (line 2) and Corydon realises that his quest is hopeless: "You are just a peasant, Corydon. Alexis does not care for gifts; and even if you were to try to win him with gifts, Iollas would not allow it" (lines 56–57). Having wasted the whole day singing, therefore, he realises that he could put his time to better use, telling himself "You will find another Alexis, if this one spurns you" (line 73).

The poem is said to represent the admiration of Virgil for a young slave whom he saw at the house of his patron Asinius Pollio, and whose beauty he thus celebrates, in the conventional style of pastoral verse. The story further goes that Pollio, charmed with the poem, made a gift of the slave to the author; and that the slave, being carefully educated, became a celebrated grammarian under his real name Alexander. According to J. B. Greenough, "This story, though not certain, is natural and probable." Some parts of the poem are imitations of Theocritus.

== See also ==
- Slavery in ancient Rome

== Sources and further reading ==
- Apostol, Ricardo (2015). "'Urbanus Es, Corydon': Ecocritiquing Town and Country in Eclogue 2". Vergilius. 61: 3–28.
- Greenough, J. B., ed. (1883). Publi Vergili Maronis: Bucolica. Aeneis. Georgica. The Greater Poems of Virgil. Vol. 1. Boston, MA: Ginn, Heath, & Co. pp. 1–4. (Public domain)
- Leach, E. W. (1966). "Nature and Art in Vergil's Second Eclogue". The American Journal of Philology. 87 (4): 427–45. doi:10.2307/292755. JSTOR 292755.
- Nisbet, R. (1995). Review of W V Clausen, A Commentary on Virgil, Eclogues. The Journal of Roman Studies, 85, 320-321.
- Otis, B. (1964). Virgil: A Study in Civilized Poetry. Oxford.
- Page, T. E., ed. (1898). P. Vergili Maronis: Bucolica et Georgica. Classical Series. London: Macmillan & Co., Ltd. pp. 102–11. (Public domain)
- Van Sickle, John (1987). "'Shepheard Slave': Civil Status & Bucolic Conceit in Virgil, 'Eclogue' 2". Quaderni Urbinati di Cultura Classica. 27 (3): 127–9. doi:10.2307/20546927. JSTOR 20546927.
