= Amoebaean singing =

Ancient Greek singing competition

Amoebaean singing is a type of singing competition originating in Ancient Greece. In it, a first party sings according to a topic and verse structure of their choosing. A second singer then responds with the same verse structure and on a related topic. This repeats until one side concedes or a third party can determine the winner.

== History ==
The form is believed to have been used by Greek shepherds to entertain themselves. Later, it would evolve into a judged competition, consisting of multiple rounds of singing between competitors. Competitors would be judged more favorably if they could continue a theme through multiple rounds.

The poet Theocritus relied heavily on Amoebaean singing, with it becoming his and his successors' "hallmark", according to David M. Halperin.

== Usage ==
Amoebaean singing can be seen in Theocritus' Idyll 5: The Goatherd and the Shepherd, in an exchange between the goatherd Comatas and the shepherd Lacon.

Comatas
The Muses bear me greater love than Daphnis ere did see;
And well they may, fort’other day they had two goats for me.

Lacon
But Apollo loves me all as well, and an offering too have I,
A fine fat ram a-batt’ning; for Apollo’s feast draws nigh.
