= Fish plate =

Ancient Greek pottery

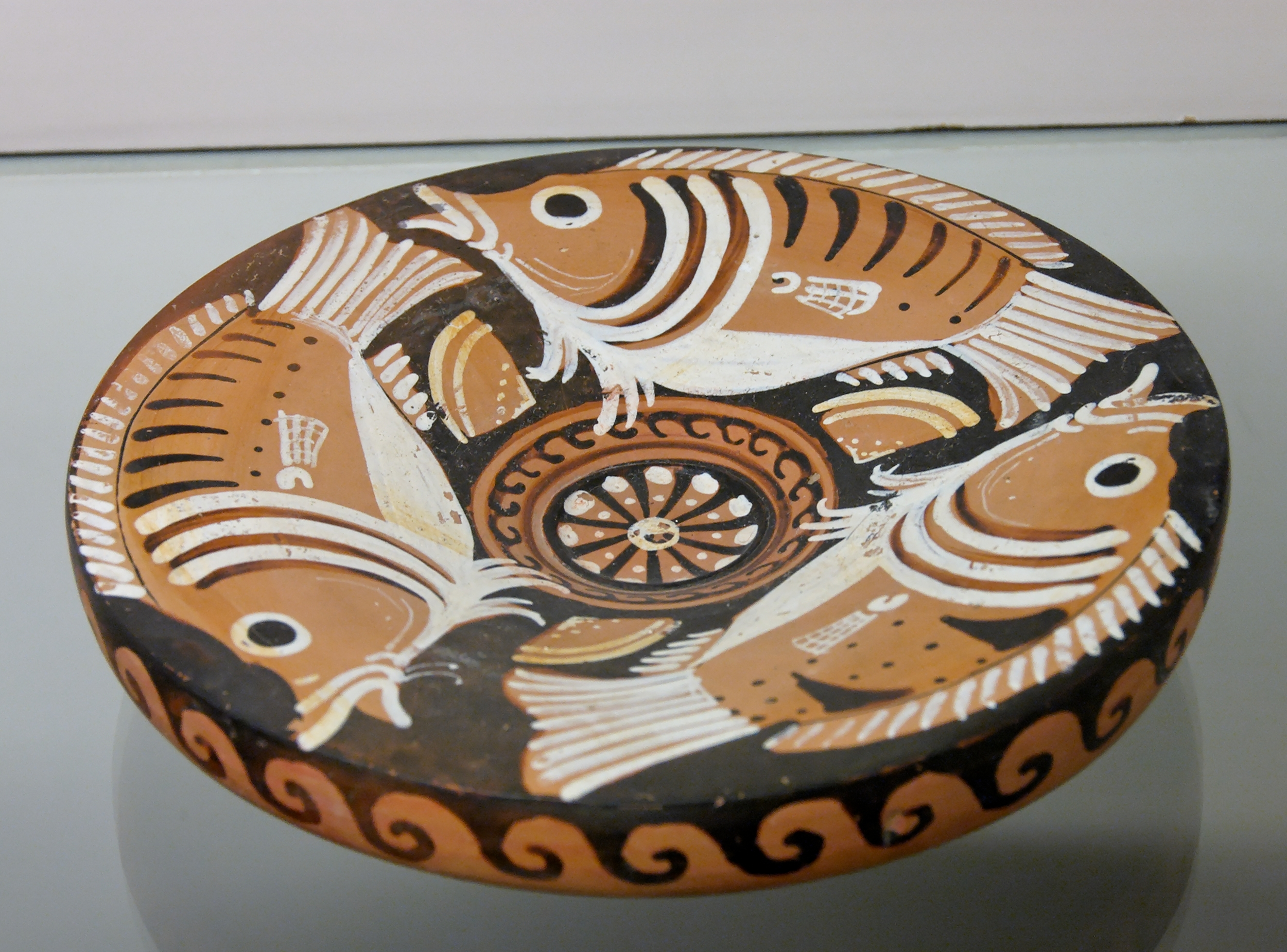
Three sea-perch and three limpets, Apulian red-figured fish plate, ca. 340–320 BC, British Museum

A fish plate is a Greek pottery vessel used by western, Hellenistic Greeks during the fourth century BC. Although invented in fifth-century BC Athens, most of the corpus of surviving painted fish plates originate in Southern Italy, where fourth-century BC Greek settlers, called "Italiotes," manufactured them.

The name "fish plate" comes from their usual decoration of seafood items which includes various fish and other marine creatures. Fishes depicted include bream, perch, torpedo fish, tuna, flying fish, puffer fish, scorpion fish, squid, cuttlefish, octopus, scallop, clam, dentalia, murex, sea snail, shrimp, crab, dolphin, and hippocamp.

== Form ==
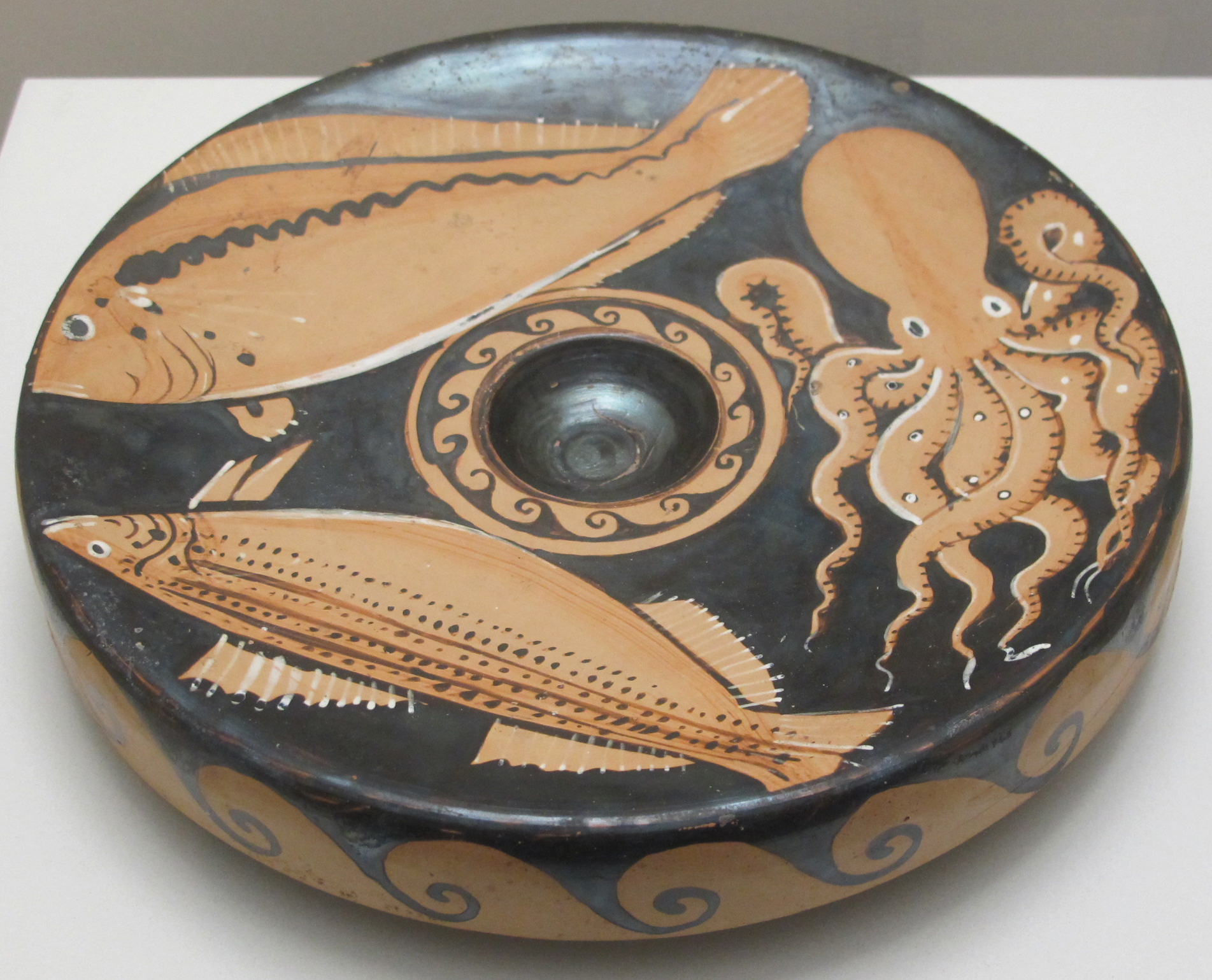
Campania, 325–290 BC

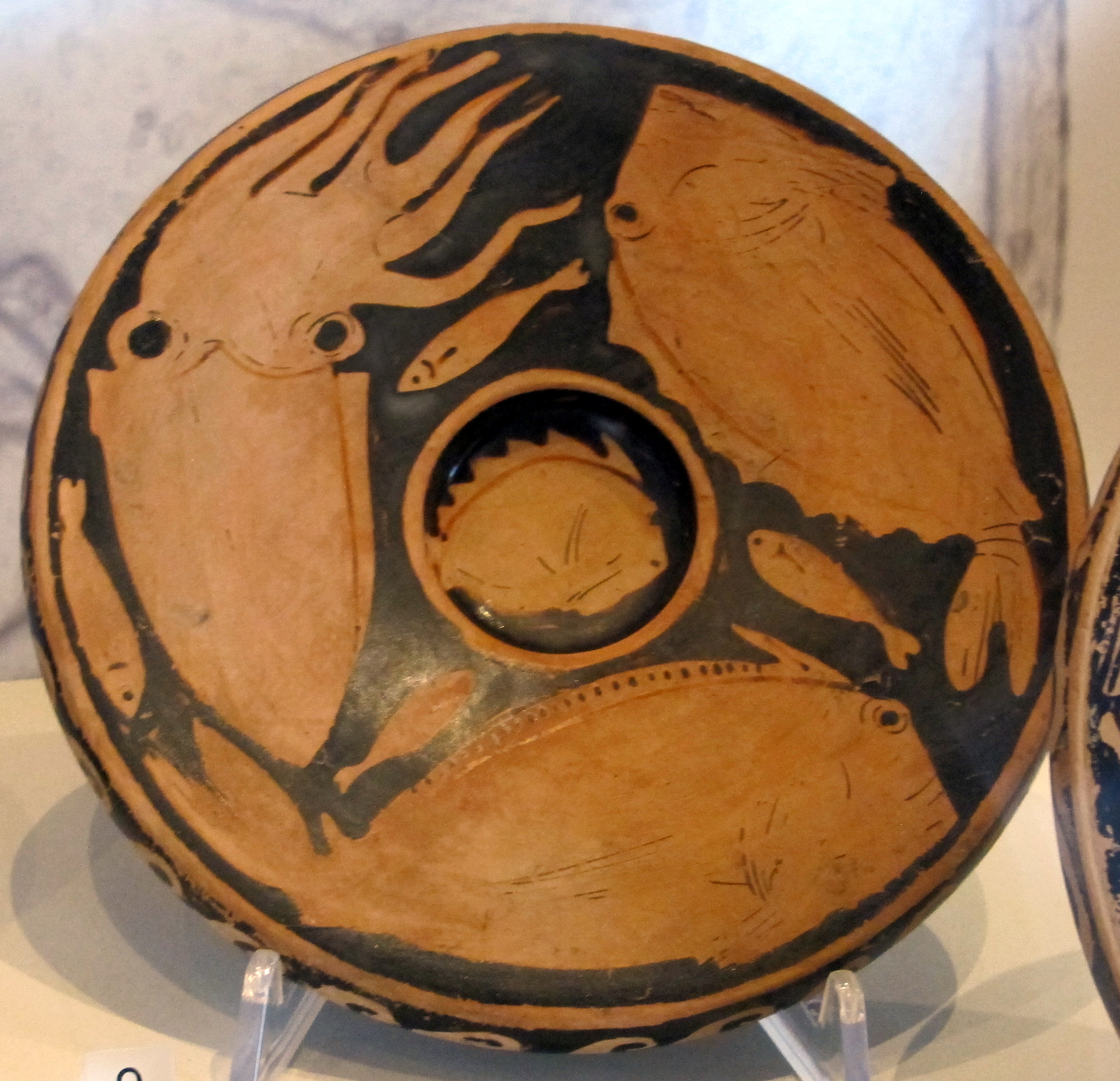
380–75 BC

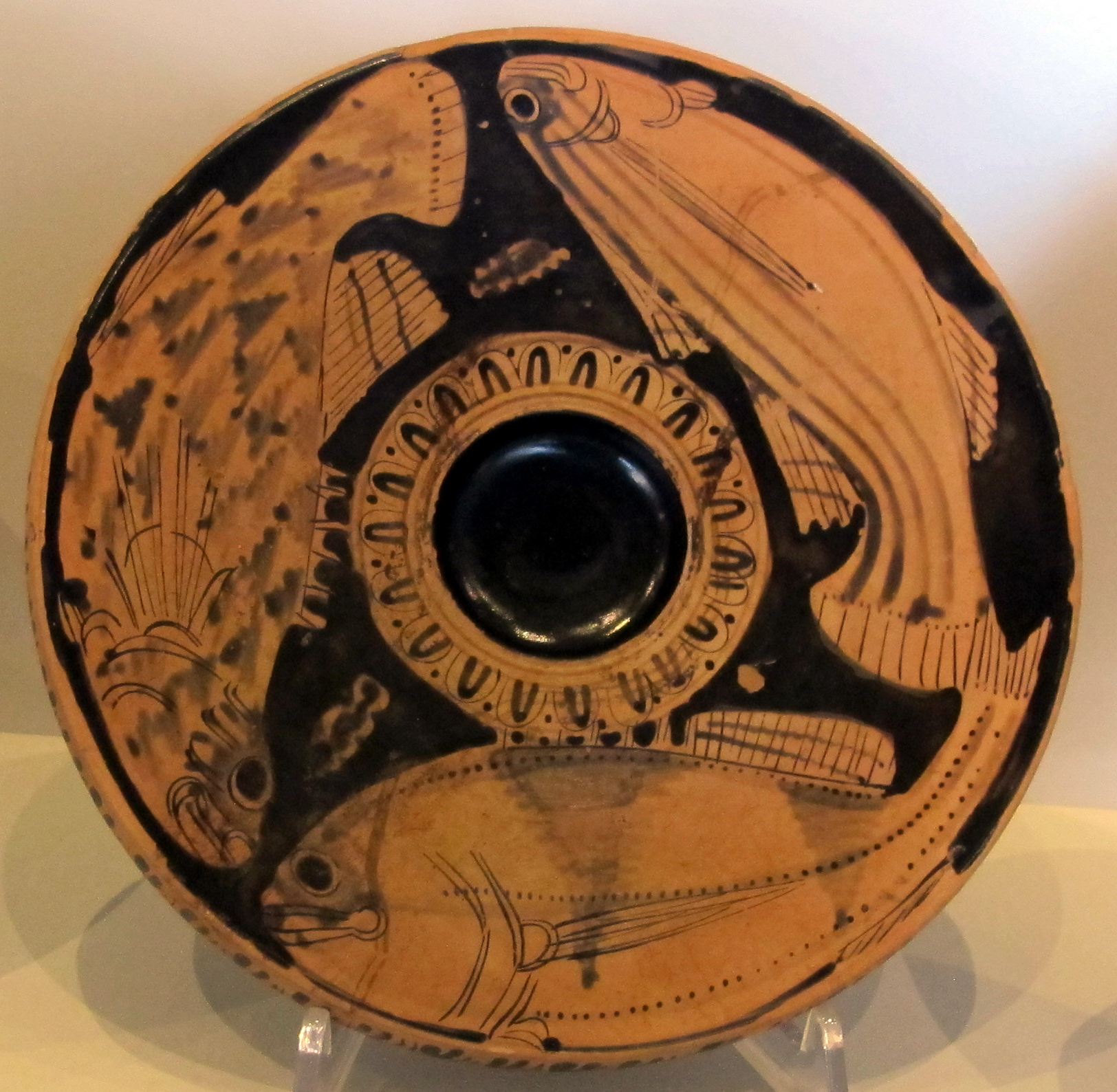
By the Scorpion Fish Painter, 380–75 BC

The form of the plate was called a "pinax" or "pinakion", meaning "tablet," because of its flat shape. The fish plate's form was that of a dimpled disk elevated on a pedestal, in other words, round and flat with a small cup in the center of plate designed to hold oil or sauce. Its rim was turned down, and often bears a decorative border, either spiraling waves, Greek key and meander motifs, or a wreath of laurel leaves. A fish plate is almost always also elevated above table level by a pedestal foot. Plates of this form are known since Minoan times (Pre-Greek), but they were not decorated with fish until the end of the fifth century BC.

== History ==
Fish plates were first produced in Athens during the late fifth century BC. These Attic fish plates are characterized by fish whose bellies are oriented towards the outside rim of the plate. In Athens the palette was restricted to red clay fabric and black gloss slip with rare uses of white overpainting. Later, Italiote Greek settlers in Southern Italy began to mass-produce more colorful fish plates in Taranto (Greek "Taras"), Paestum (Greek "Poseidonia"), Capua (Etruscan "Capue"), and Cumae (Greek "Kyme"). The South Italian fish plates are characterized by decoration in which the fish's bellies are oriented towards the sauce cup at the center of the plate.

== Workshops ==
Fish plates can be classified by the workshops that made them. Attic fishplates were manufactured in the Kerameikos district of Athens, Greece; Apulian fish plates were manufactured in various workshops in Taranto (Taras) on the "heel of the boot" of Italy; Campanian fish plates come from the region of the Bay of Naples, Italy (There were factories in both Capua and Cumae (Kyme)); Paestan plates were made in Paestum (Poseidonia), south of Salerno, Italy (These are the only fish plates signed by the artists, coming from the workshops of Python and Asteas.). Fish plates were made in almost all South Italian ceramic factories except for those in Lucania (on the Gulf of Taranto, the "arch of the boot" of Italy). For illustrations of fish plates made by these workshops, see the external links at the end of this article.

== Decoration ==
All painted fish plates are red-figure ware, meaning that the creatures are left in reserve, while the body of the vessel is largely painted in black glaze. Then dilute glaze and white overpainting were applied. Sometimes, in the South Italian examples the palette is enlarged to include deep red, pink, and yellow overpainting as well. This polychrome technique with its chiaroscuro (highlights and lowlights) is called "sovradipinto." Many of the creatures pre-evidence the trompe-l'œil art characteristic of later, Graeco-Roman painting and mosaics found at Pompeii and other Roman resorts in Magna Graecia (Greek-speaking Southern Italy).

Some contend that fish plates were decorated with pictures of the seafood they were intended to hold. Most of them, however, have been found in mortuary contexts, so it might be surmised that the fish images could represent symbolic offerings for the dead. On the other hand, these plates could just as well be objects which were in popular use among the living, placed in tombs for the deceased to continue using in the hereafter. At any rate the small size of these plates could not realistically afford some of the large aquatic animals represented upon them, and the decoration must therefore be regarded as artistic or symbolic compositions rather than pictures of actual food items on the plates. The type without painted decoration continues throughout much of the Greek world until the late Hellenistic period.

== Bibliography ==
- South Italian Vase Painting by A.D. Trendall (ISBN 978-0714112541)
- Red Figure Vases of South Italy and Sicily by A.D. Trendall (ISBN 978-0500202258)
- The History of Greek Vases by John Boardman (ISBN 978-0500285930)
- Vase-Painting in Italy by the Museum of Fine Arts, Boston (ISBN 978-0878464067)
- Arthur Dale Trendall; Ian McPhee: Greek red-figured fish-plates, Antike Kunst, Beiheft 14, Basel 1987
- Norbert Kunisch: Griechische Fischteller. Natur und Bild, Berlin 1989, ISBN 3-7861-1562-1
- Arthur Dale Trendall; Ian McPhee: Addenda to "Greek red-figured fish-plates", in: Antike Kunst 33 (1990) S. 31–51
- Arthur Dale Trendall: Rotfigurige Vasen aus Unteritalien und Sizilien. Ein Handbuch. von Zabern, Mainz 1991 (Kulturgeschichte der Antiken Welt Bd. 47) ISBN 3-8053-1111-7
- Christian Zindel: Meeresleben und Jenseitsfahrt. Die Fischteller der Sammlung Florence Gottet, Kilchberg/Zürich 1998, ISBN 3-905083-13-2
- Rolf Hurschmann: Fischteller, in Der Neue Pauly Bd. 4 (1998), Sp. 530–531.
