= Nicias alurnoides =

Scientific classification
- Kingdom: Animalia
- Phylum: Arthropoda
- Clade: Pancrustacea
- Class: Insecta
- Order: Coleoptera
- Suborder: Polyphaga
- Infraorder: Cucujiformia
- Family: Cerambycidae
- Subfamily: Prioninae
- Tribe: Anacolini
- Genus: Nicias; Thomson, 1857
- Species: N. alurnoides

Binomial name
- Nicias alurnoides (Thomson, 1857)

Synonyms
- (Genus): Hamadryades Thomson, 1857

Genus of beetles

Nicias is a genus of beetles in the family Cerambycidae. It is monotypic, being represented by the single species Nicias alurnoides. Other species formerly placed in the genus Nicias are now classified in the genus Oideterus.
