= Idyll VI =

Poem by Theocritus

Idyll VI, otherwise known as Bucolic poem 6, was written by Theocritus in dactylic hexameter. The exact date of its composition is unknown. It references characters that have appeared in other works of literature such as Homer's Odyssey, Ovid's Metamorphoses, and Theocritus' Idyll XI.

== Summary ==
The poem is addressed to Aratus, a friend of Theocritus, who is also referenced in Idyll VII. The poem tells the tale of two herdsmen, Damoetas and Daphnis, gathering their herds in the same spot where Daphnis engages Damoetas in a singing competition. Daphnis addresses the state of the relationship between Polyphemus and Galatea, whereby she both flirts with and teases him. However, Daphnis warns Polyphemus of the consequences of actively wooing her. Following Daphnis’ song, Damoetas answers by assuming the role of Polyphemus and singing of his actions, which are meant to make her desire him more. The poem ends with the exchange of instruments by the two singers and the recognition that neither lost in the competition.

== Social and Literary Context ==
Lawall argues that the poem is meant to be instructions directed to both Aratus and the reader about the pitfalls of love. In addition, Lawall interpreted the relationship between Damoetas and Daphnis as ideal love in contrast to the relationship between Polyphemus and Galatea, which most closely resembles real love. The ideal love shared between Damoetas and Daphnis is characterized by the lack of conflict between the two figures and the complementary nature of their respective songs. The relationship between Polyphemus and Galatea is characterized by teasing, willful ignorance, and a lack of shared love. Therefore, the poem uses the relationship between Galatea and Polyphemus to highlight the flaws of real relationships. It is meant to act as advice to avoid such flaws in order to live in mutual harmony as the characters of Damoetas and Daphnis seem to do.

Gutzwiller also noted that only a small difference in age exists between Damoetas and Daphnis, while Polyphemus and Galatea are portrayed as near opposites. In contrast to Lawall, Gutzwiller interpreted the story of Polyphemus and Galatea as a way for Damoetas and Daphnis to explore their own differences as lovers. For Gutzwiller, this exploration results in the inversion of gender roles in a relationship, since Galatea pursues Polyphemus, which lessens the importance of difference in the relationship, since even two opposites can assume each other's roles. Gutzwiller argues that this reduced importance of difference in the relationship allows Damoetas and Daphnis to ignore their more slight differences.

== Translation ==
'To hear this makes her jealous of me, by Paean, and she wastes with pain, and springs madly from the sea'

Translation by J.M Edmonds :

Damoetas and neatherd Daphnis, Aratus, half-bearded one, the other's chin ruddy with the down, had driven each his herd together to a single spot at noon of a summer's day, and sitting them down side by side at a water-spring began to sing. Daphnis sang first, for from hi came the challenge:

See Cyclops! Galatéa's at thy flock with apples, see! The apples fly, and she doth cry ‘A fool’s-in-love are ye’; But with never a look to the maid, poor heart, thou sit’st and pipest so fine. Lo yonder again she flings them amain at that good flock-dog o’ thine! See how he looks to seaward and bays her from the land! See how he's glassed where he runs so fast i' the pretty wee waves o’ the strand! Beware of he'll leap as she comes from the deep, leap on her legs so bonny, And towse her sweet pretty flesh – But lo where e’en now she wantons upon ye! O the high thistle-down and the dry thistle-down i' the heat o’the pretty summer O! – She'll fly ye and deny ye if ye’ll a-wooing go, But cease to woo and she'll pursue, aye, then the king's the move; For oft the foul, good Polypheme, is fair i' the eyes of love.

Then Damoetas in answer lifted up his voice, singing:

I saw, I saw her fling them, Lord Pan my witness be; I was not blind, I vow, by this my one sweet – this Wherewith Heav’n send I see to the end, and Télemus when he Foretells me woe, then be it so, but woe for him and his! – ; ‘Tis tit for tat, to tease her on I look not on the jade And say there’s other wives to wed, and lo! she’s jealous made, Jealous for me, Lord save us! and ‘gins to pine for me And glowers from the deep on the cave and the sheep like a want-wit lass o’ the sea And the dog that bayed, I hissed him on; for when ‘twas I to woo He’ld lay his snout to her lap, her lap, and whine her friendly to. Maybe she’ll send me messages if long I go this gate; But I’ll bar the door till she swear o’ this shore to be my wedded mate. Ill-favoured? nay, for all they say; I have looked i' the glassy sea, And, for aught I could spy, both beard and eye were pretty as well could be, And the teeth all a-row like marble below, – and that none should o’erlook me of it, As Goody Cotyttaris taught me, thrice in my breast I spit.

So far Damoetas, and kissed Daphnis, and that to this gave a pipe and this to that a pretty flue. Then lo! the piper was neatherd Daphnis and the flute-player Damoetas, and the dancers were the heifers who forthwith began to bound mid the tender grass. And as for the victory, that fell to neither one, being they both stood unvanquished in the match.

== See also ==
- Eclogue 7
