= Idyll XI =

'To hear this makes her jealous of me, by Paean, and she wastes with pain, and springs madly from the sea'

Idyll XI, otherwise known as Bucolic poem 11, was written by Theocritus in dactylic hexameter. Its main character, the Cyclops Polyphemus, has appeared in other works of literature such as Homer's Odyssey, and Theocritus' Idyll VI.

== Overview ==
Theocritus' Idyll XI, the "Cyclops", relates Polyphemus' longing for the sea-nymph Galatea, and how Polyphemus' cured himself of the wound of this unrequited love through song. This idyll is one of Theocritus' best-well-known bucolics, along with Idylls I, VI, and VII. Idyll XI has an unusual set of narrative framing, as Theocritus appears in propria persona, and directly offers his friend Nicias consolatio amoris. Nicias worked as a doctor, and it is likely the two knew each other in their youth. Nicias was also a poet, as he responded to Theocritus' advice in a similar fashion. Theocritus' source for the work was Philoxenus' Cyclops, relating Polyphemus' love for Galatea.

== Synopsis ==
In the Idyll, Theocritus gives advice to a friend suffering from Love. He recommends seeking the "medicine" for his "wound" in song, as the Cyclops Polyphemus was once able to do.

Theocritus first says that "song' is the only cure for love":

"οὐδὲν πὸτ τὸν ἔρωτα πεφύκει φάρμακον ἄλλο Νικία οὔτ᾽ ἔγχριστον, ἐμὶν δοκεῖ, οὔτ᾽ ἐπίπαστον..."

Although he once was "languishing" while he sang of his love, eventually the Cyclops was able to find the cure through a different kind of song. Polyphemus begins by asking why his love is spurned, before acknowledging the obvious reason of his looks. He makes up for this, however, by reminding her of stores of cheese, and his vast flocks of sheep, and encourages Galatea to leave the sea and join him on land. Should she refuse, it would cause him to lose his soul or life, and even his one eye. Polyphemus later comes off as desperate because he wishes someone could teach him how to swim, and that he would even prefer to have gills in order to join her in the sea. Eventually, Polyphemus gathers his wits, and reminds himself to go back to his chores such as taking care of his flock. Polyphemus ends his song with an optimistic note, as he remembers that there are other women on the island who might be interested in him. The piece concludes with Theocritus pointing out that Polyphemus had successfully found a cure for his love in song, without having to pay a doctor.

== Connections and critiques ==
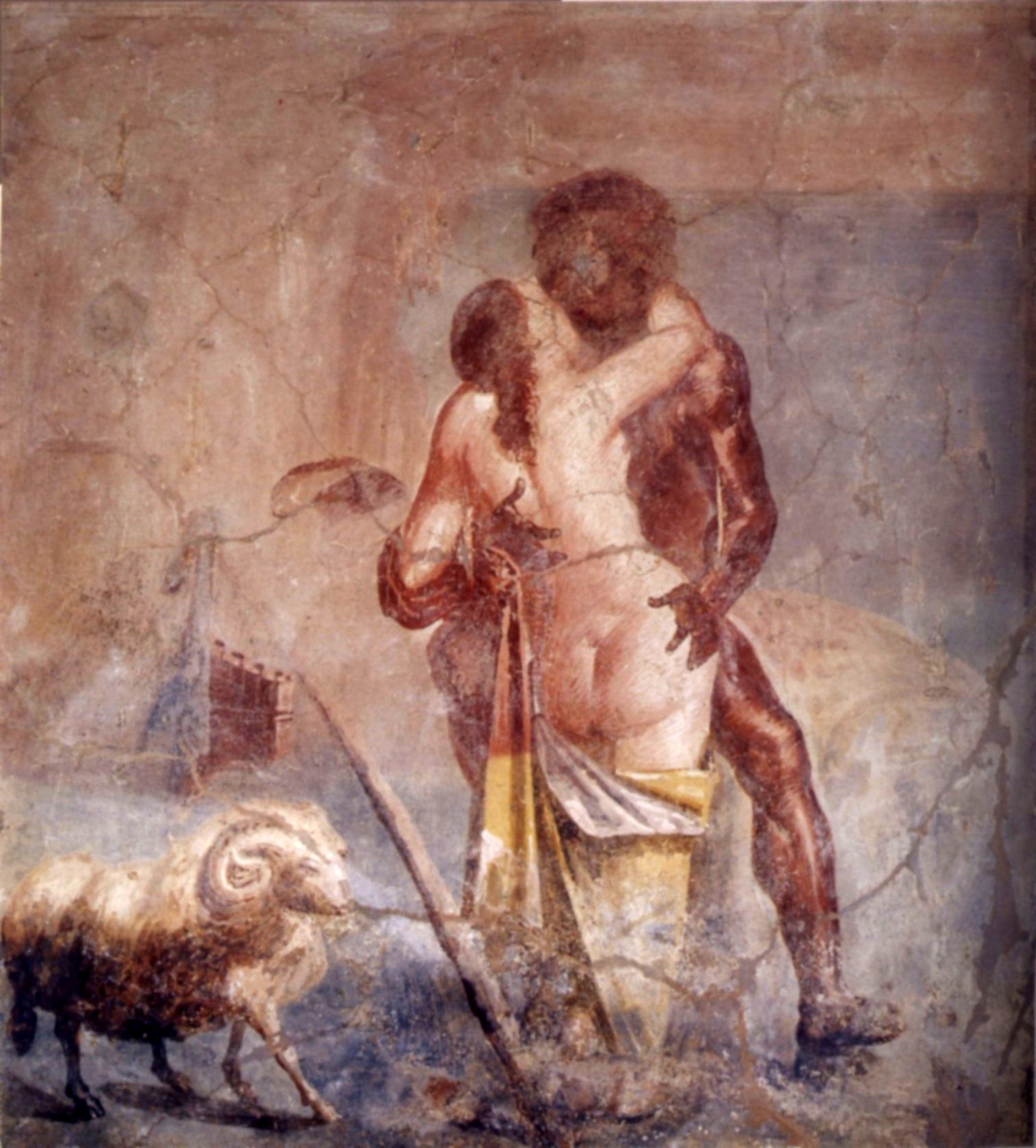
Polyphemus and Galatea. Fresco from Pompeii, c. AD 50–79

Lucia Prauscello analyzed lines 25–27 of Idyll 11 and concluded that there are parallels between the characters of Idyll XI and the Odyssey, as the text mimics the thoughts and emotions expressed by characters in the Odyssey. Lines 25–27 consist of the following text:

White Galatea, whiter than cottage cheese,
Why cast away the one who loves you?
Softer than lamb's wool, springier than the knees
Of a newborn calf, bright as an unripe grape.

Prauscello introduces the scene between Odysseus and Nausicaa in Book 6 of the Odyssey, and draws the connections between Polyphemus and Nausicaa, and Galatea. Polyphemus and Nausicaa have an unrequited love for Galatea and Odysseus respectively; Polyphemus dreams of the day he will woo Galatea over, and Nausicaa dreams at the notion of marrying Odysseus. Prauscello contrasts Polyphemus' desire with Nausicaa’s by explaining Polyphemus’ mindset to be more superficial; the Cyclops does not share a matrimonial view with Galatea, where as Nausicaa arguably does, as she idols Odysseus.

According to Kelly, Polyphemus can be compared to Homer's version of the Cyclops as a solitary, lonely individual; in Idyll XI, Polyphemus alerts the reader of his thoughts through songs and comes off as a sensible, emotional and realistic person. When comparing Idyll XI and VI, the two poems illustrate a reverse of character roles; Id. 11 depicts Polyphemus as acknowledging his failure in wooing Galatea, but Id. 6 characterizes Polyphemus as a little more passive, and ironically, Galatea pursuing him.

A.S.F. Gow has criticized the inclusion of the narrative framing as part of the Idyll proper. He argued that such framework creates a contradiction, as "song" is depicted as both the solution, and one of the symptoms of Polyphemus' problem (line 13). In order to reconcile such a contradiction, Gow recommends omitting parts of the address to Nicias. Farr et al. argue that the contradicting songs actually represent two different states of Polyphemus' love. In lines 13–16, he is singing in order to woo Galatea, whereas in lines 17–18, he has changed locations, and now is singing his cure.

Edward W. Spofford describes the concluding lines as being an "implicit contrast between a cultured society and ... a primitive one." Spofford's remark is part of a series of comparisons between Polyphemus and Theocritus; he is trying to prove Theocritus' choice of illustration valid. In order to convey the appropriate message to his friend regarding love, Theocritus must make it clear that there is something to be learned from Polyphemus' example; he does this by referring to the Cyclops as his "countryman," and removes him from the Homeric monster by making him enter adulthood.

Virgil imitates Idyll XI in Eclogue II. The subject of Virgil's poem is a supposedly rough and uncouth shepherd Corydon, who corresponds to the grotesque figure of the Cyclops in Theocritus' poem. Corydon is in love with an unattainable boy named Alexis, just as Galatea is unattainable by Polyphemos. (Corydon seems to be indiscriminate in his sexual preferences, since he compares and contrasts Alexis with previous love interests both male and female.) Corydon sings of his love for Alexis in what is at times nearly a word-for-word translation of Theocritus' Greek into elegant Latin verse, setting up a contrast, similar to that in Idyll XI, between the supposedly unlettered and artless shepherd and the exquisitely wrought stream of verse he sings. Unlike Idyll XI, Corydon's song is not set in a personalized frame; it is preceded by just a few lines setting up the context.

Idyll XI is also imitated, or more accurately parodied, by Ovid, Metamorphoses XIII 789ff., which tells the story of Galatea and Acis, her lover, and the Cyclops. The Cyclops, spurned by Galatea in favor of Acis, sings his charming and tender song, modeled on both Idyll XI and Eclogue II but drawn out to absurd length, and at the end suddenly announces that he is going to tear his rival Acis apart limb from limb. He proceeds to tear out a chunk of a mountain and hurls it at Acis, who is crushed (literally). The story is told by Galatea.
