= Idyll III =

Poem by Theocritus

Idyll III, also called Κώμος ('The Serenade'), is a bucolic poem by the 3rd-century BC Greek poet Theocritus. The poet appears to personate a young goatherd, who after five lines dedicatory to a friend whom he calls Tityrus, serenades his mistress Amaryllis outside her cave. The poem is a monologue, but, like Idyll II, preserves the dialogue-form by means of a dumb character.

== Summary ==
A goatherd, leaving his goats to feed on the hill-side, in the charge of Tityrus, approaches the cavern of Amaryllis, with its veil of ferns and ivy, and attempts to win back the heart of the girl by song. He mingles promises with threats, and repeats in verse the names of the famous lovers of old days, Milanion and Endymion. Failing to move Amaryllis, the goatherd threatens to die where he has thrown himself down, beneath the trees.

== Analysis ==
According to J. M. Edmonds, "The appeal to Amaryllis may be regarded as consisting of three parts each ending with the offer of a gift—apples, garland, a goat—and a fourth part containing a love-song of four stanzas. The reciter would doubtless make a slight pause to mark the rejection of each gift and the failure of the song before the renewal of the cry of despair."

== Illustrations ==
'Ah, lovely Amaryllis, why no more, as of old, dost thou glance through this cavern after me, nor callest me, thy sweetheart, to thy side'

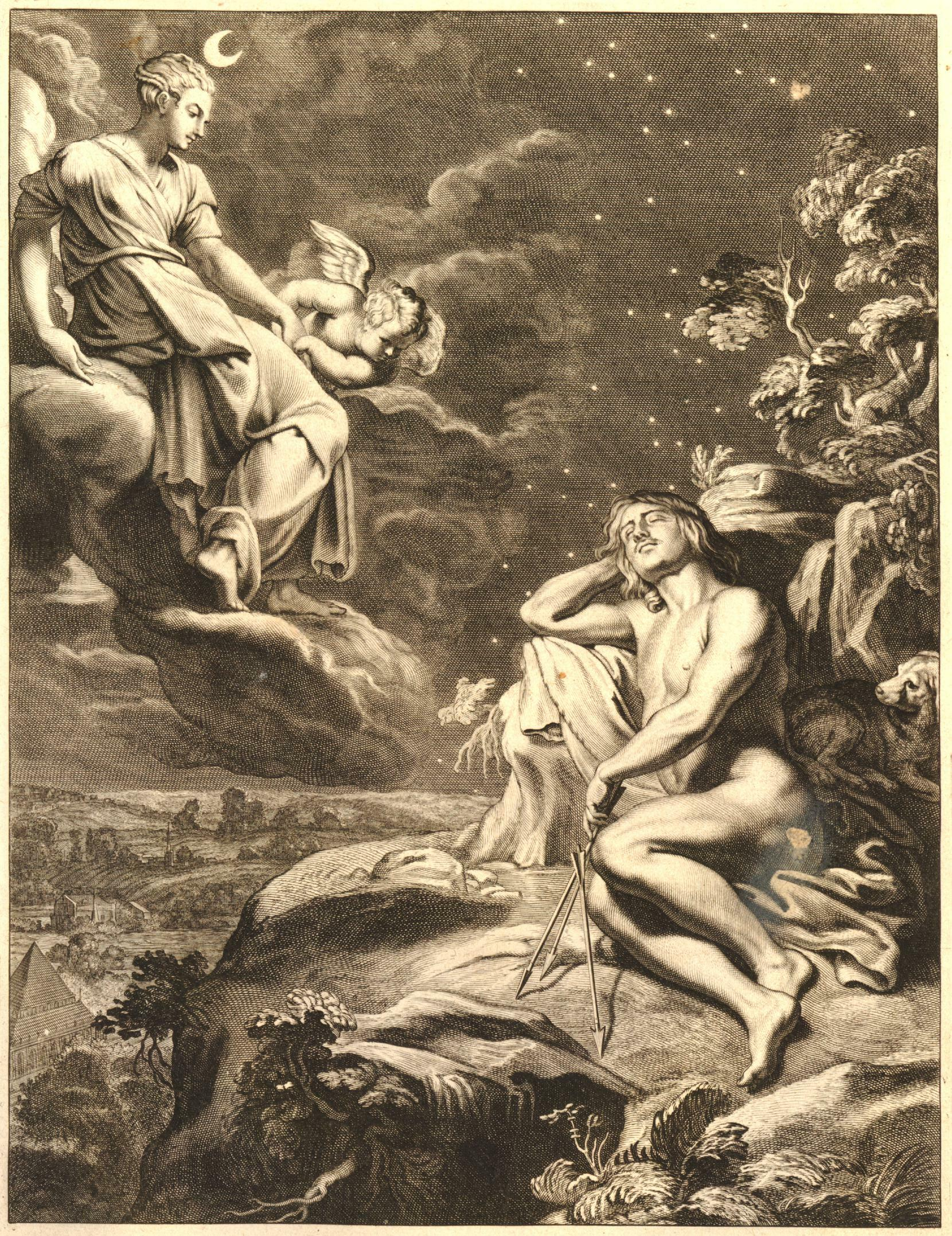
Endymion asleep, watched by Selene; engraved by Cornelis Bloemaert and Theodor Matham after Abraham van Diepenbeeck, c. 1635–8

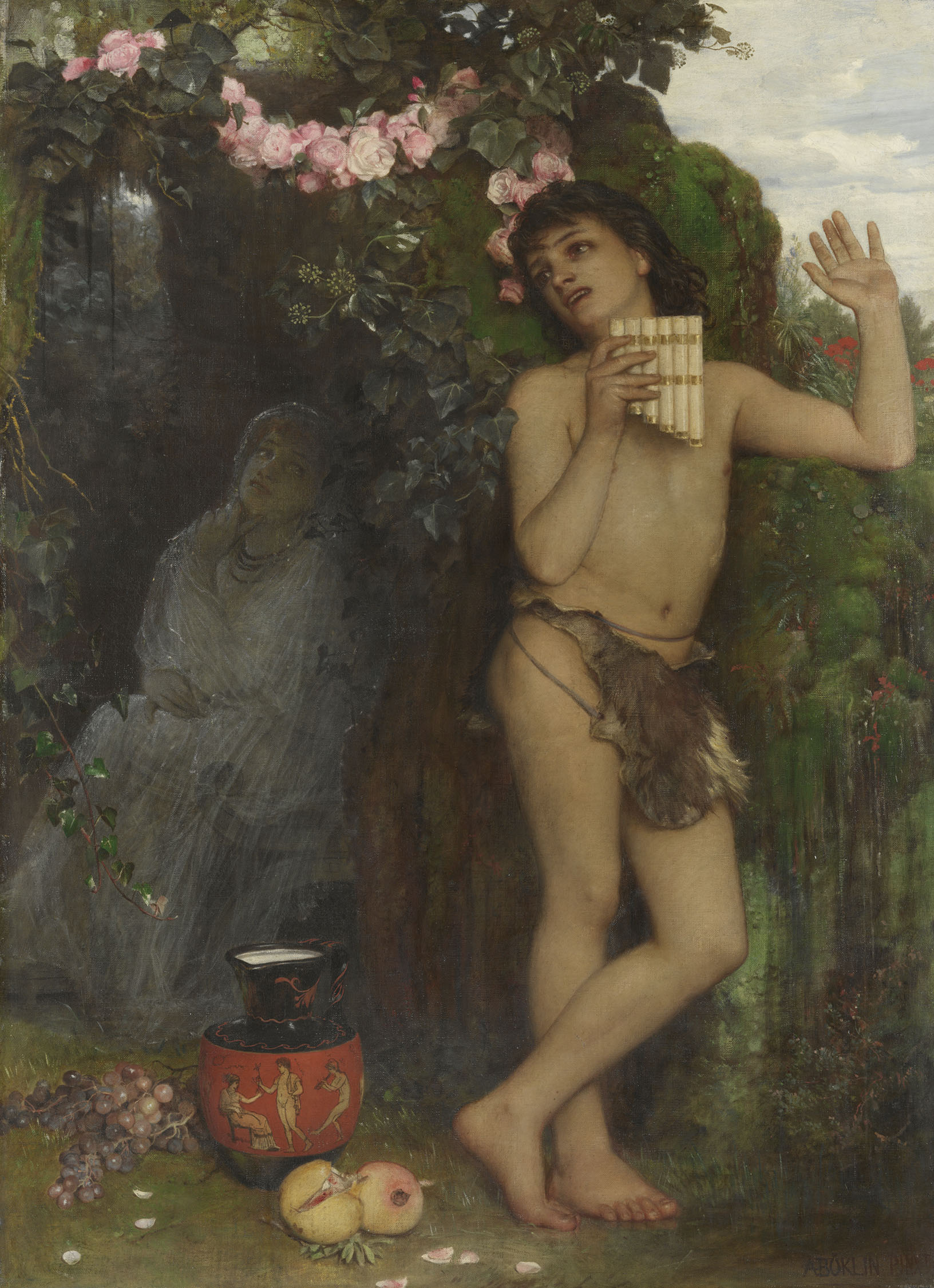
The complaint of the shepherd (Amaryllis); painted by Arnold Böcklin, 1866

== See also ==
- Eclogue 2
- Eclogue 8

== Sources ==
- Chesi, G. M. (2018). "Intertextuality and Poetic Voice in Theocritus' Idyll 3". Mnemosyne. 71 (3): 489–96. doi:10.1163/1568525X-12342227. JSTOR 26572931.

Attribution:

- Edmonds, J. M., ed. (1919). The Greek Bucolic Poets (3rd ed.). William Heinemann. pp. 41–7.
- Lang, Andrew, ed. (1880). Theocritus, Bion, and Moschus. London: Macmillan and Co. pp. 16–18.
