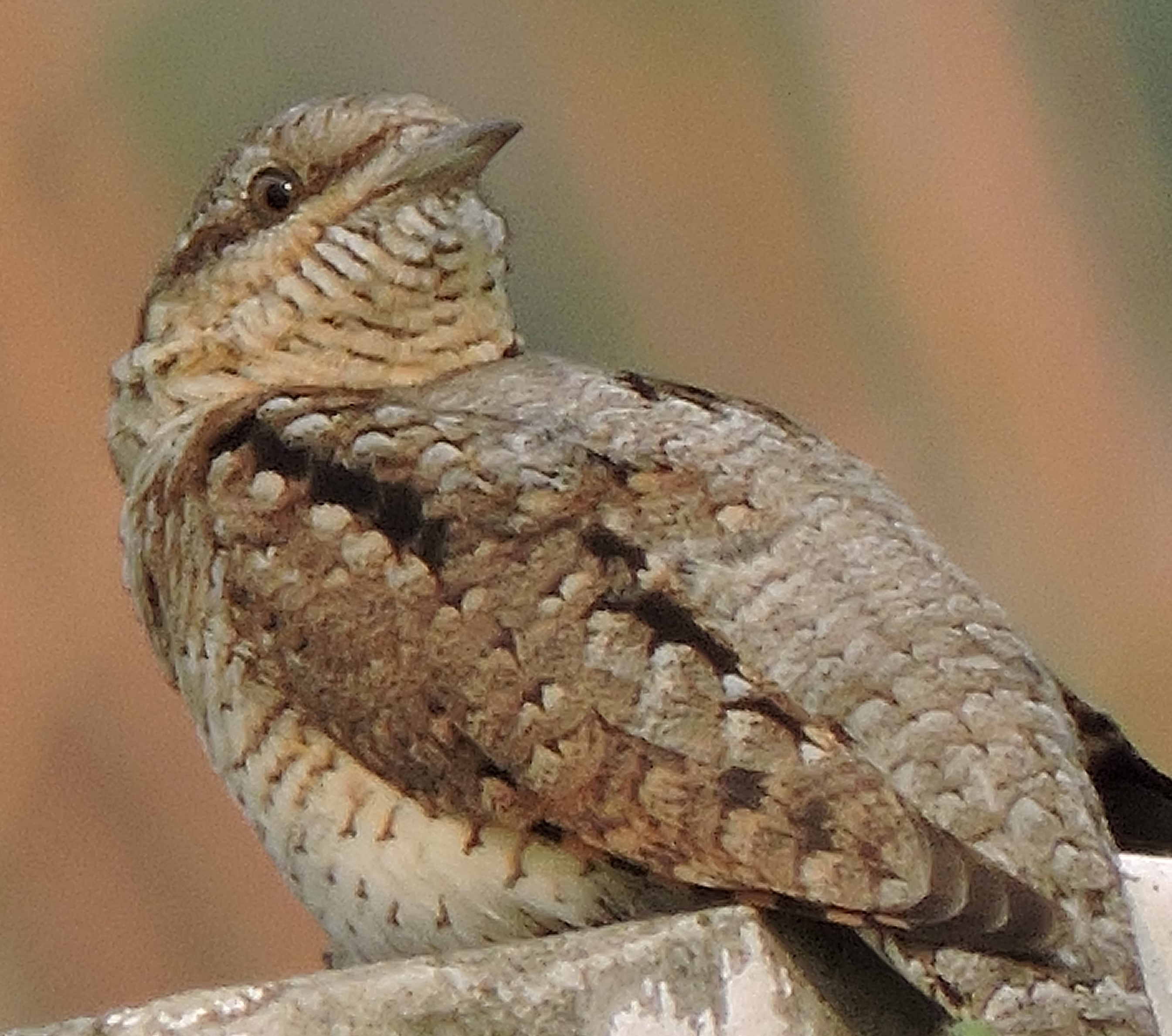
- Eurasian wryneck (Jynx torquilla) Punjab, India

Scientific classification
- Kingdom: Animalia
- Phylum: Chordata
- Class: Aves
- Order: Piciformes
- Family: Picidae
- Subfamily: Jynginae
- Genus: Jynx; Linnaeus, 1758

Type species
- Jynx torquilla (Eurasian wryneck) Linnaeus, 1758

Species
- Jynx torquilla Jynx ruficollis
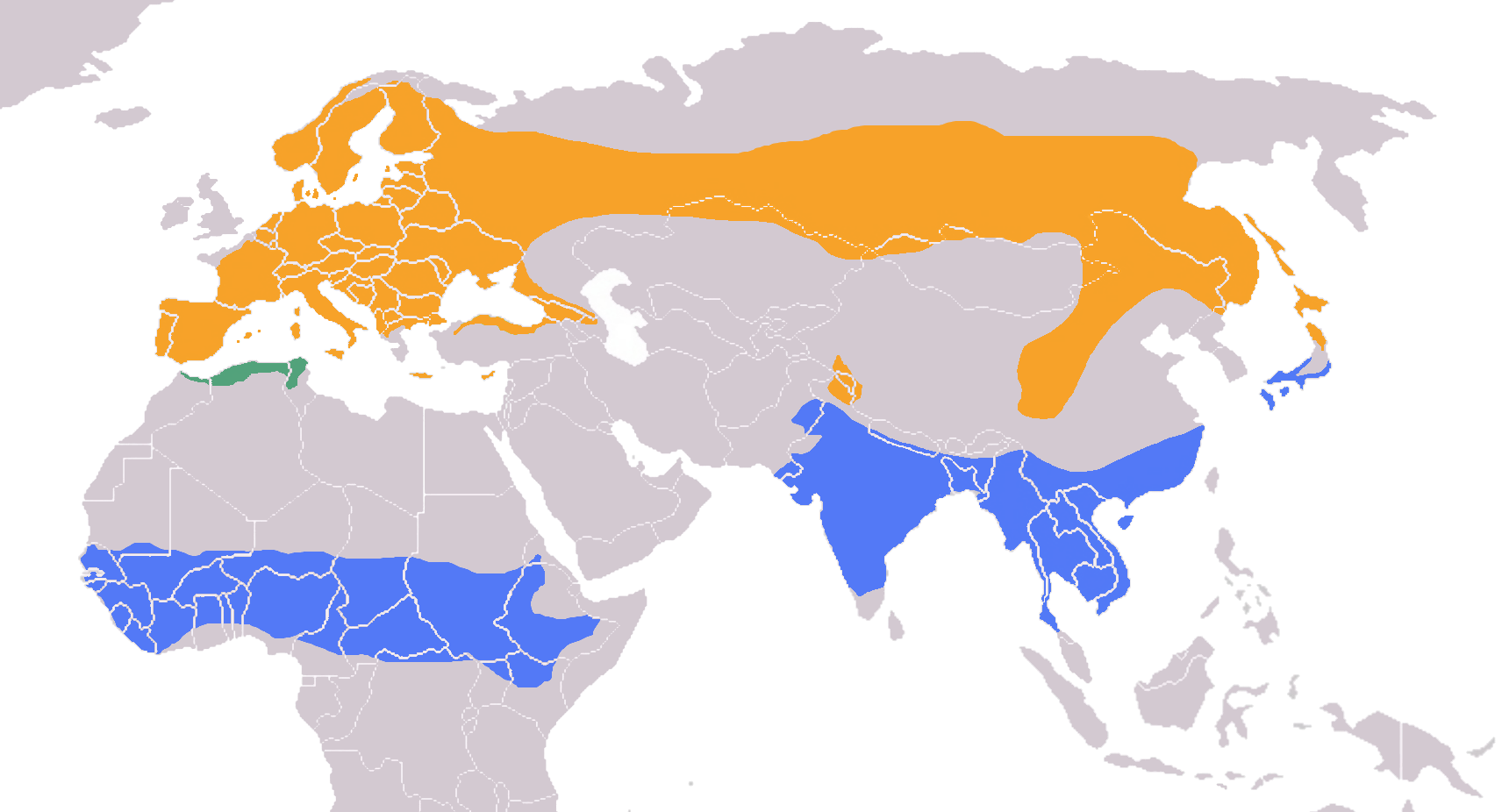
- Range map for Eurasian wryneck
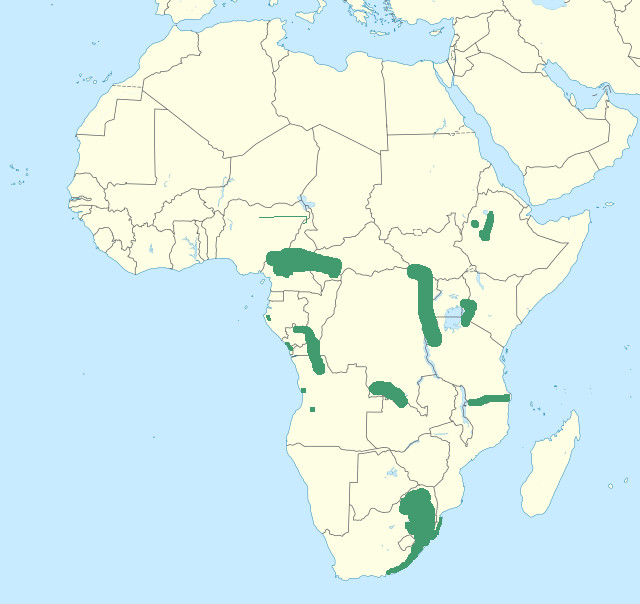
- Range map for red-throated wryneck Summer Resident Winter

= Wryneck =

Wrynecks

Genus of woodpeckers

The wrynecks (genus Jynx) are a small but distinctive group of small Old World woodpeckers. Jynx is from the Ancient Greek iunx, the Eurasian wryneck.

These birds get their English name from their ability to turn their heads almost 180°. When disturbed at the nest, they use this snake-like head twisting and hissing as a threat display. It has occasionally been called "snake-bird" for that reason.

Like the true woodpeckers, wrynecks have large heads, long tongues, which they use to extract their insect prey, and zygodactyl feet, with two toes pointing forward and two backwards, but they lack the stiff tail feathers that the true woodpeckers use when climbing trees, so they are more likely than their relatives to perch on a branch rather than an upright trunk. The sexes have a similar appearance.

Their bills are shorter and less dagger-like than in the true woodpeckers, but their chief prey is ants and other insects, which they find in decaying wood or almost bare soil. They reuse woodpecker holes for nesting, rather than making their own holes. The eggs are white, as with many hole nesters.

The two species have cryptic plumage, with intricate patterning of greys and browns. The adult moults rapidly between July and September, although some moult continues in its winter quarters.

== Taxonomy and etymology ==
The woodpeckers are an ancient bird family consisting of three subfamilies, the wrynecks, the piculets and the true woodpeckers, Picinae. DNA sequencing and phylogenetic analysis show that the wrynecks are a sister clade to other woodpeckers including the Picinae and probably diverged early from the rest of the family.

The wryneck subfamily Jynginae has one genus, Jynx, introduced in 1758 by Swedish naturalist Carl Linnaeus in the 10th edition of his Systema Naturae. Linnaeus placed a single species in the genus, the Eurasian wryneck (Jynx torquilla), which is therefore the type species. The genus name Jynx is from the Ancient Greek name for the Eurasian wryneck, ιυγξ, iunx, and ruficollis is from the Latin rufus, "rufous" and collum "neck". The English "wryneck" refers to the habit of birds in this genus of twisting and writhing their necks when agitated. It was first recorded in 1585. The red-throated wryneck was first described by German ornithologist Johann Georg Wagler in 1830. It is also known as the rufous-throated wryneck or red-breasted wryneck.

The two wrynecks form a superspecies that probably separated early in their evolution from the piculets, although there has subsequently been only limited divergence between the Jynx species.

=== Fossil record ===
The woodpecker family appears to have diverged from other Piciformes about fifty million years ago, and a 2017 study considered that the split between Jynx and other woodpeckers occurred about 22.5 million years ago. A fossil dating from the early Miocene, more than twenty million years ago, consisting of the distal end of a tarsometatarsus had some Jynx-like features, but was classed as an early piculet. By the Pliocene (five million years ago) woodpeckers were similar to those now extant. Fossil wrynecks are known from Europe in the Pleistocene, between 2.6 million and 11,700 years ago.

=== Species ===
The two species in Jynx are restricted to the Palearctic biogeographic realm and Africa. The Eurasian wryneck breeds across temperate Europe and Asia, and one of only two Old World woodpeckers to undertake long-distance migration mainly wintering in sub-Saharan Africa and tropical Asia. The red-throated wryneck has a disjunct distribution confined to sub-Saharan Africa. It is resident, although there may be local movements and post-breeding dispersal. Both wrynecks have several geographical subspecies.

Genus Jynx – Linnaeus, 1758 – two species
| Common name | Scientific name and subspecies | Range | Size and ecology | IUCN status and estimated population |
|---|---|---|---|---|
| Eurasian wryneck | Jynx torquilla Linnaeus, 1758 Six subspecies: J. t. torquilla Linnaeus, 1758; J. t. chinensis Hesse, 1911; J. t. himalayana Vaurie, 1959; J. t. mauretanica Rothschild, 1909; J. t. sarudnyi Loudon, 1912; J. t. tschusii Kleinschmidt, 1907 | Palearctic from the Arctic Circle south to Spain, Algeria, Morocco, southern Siberia, Central Asia, Japan and southern China. Winters south of the Sahara from Senegal in the west to Ethiopia in the east, and in tropical South and Southeast Asia. | Size: 17 cm (6.7 in). 26 to 50 g (0.92 to 1.76 oz). Habitat: Open countryside and gardens, especially with some old trees. Diet: Mainly ants | LC |
| Red-throated wryneck | Jynx ruficollis (Wagler, 1830) Three subspecies: J. r. ruficollis Wagler, 1830; J. r. aequatorialis Ruppell, 1842; J. r. pulchricollis Hartlaub, 1884 | Resident in sub-Saharan Africa from Nigeria, Cameroon, Central African Republic and Ethiopia south to South Africa and Eswatini. | Size: 19 cm (7.5 in) in length. Male52–59 g (1.8–2.1 oz) Female 46–52 g (1.6–1.8 oz) Habitat: Diet: | LC |

== Cited texts ==
- Gorman, Gerard (2014). Woodpeckers of the World. Helm Photographic Guides. London: Christopher Helm. ISBN 978-1-4081-4715-3.
- Gorman, Gerard (2022). The Wryneck. Exeter: Pelagic. ISBN 978-1-78427-288-3.
