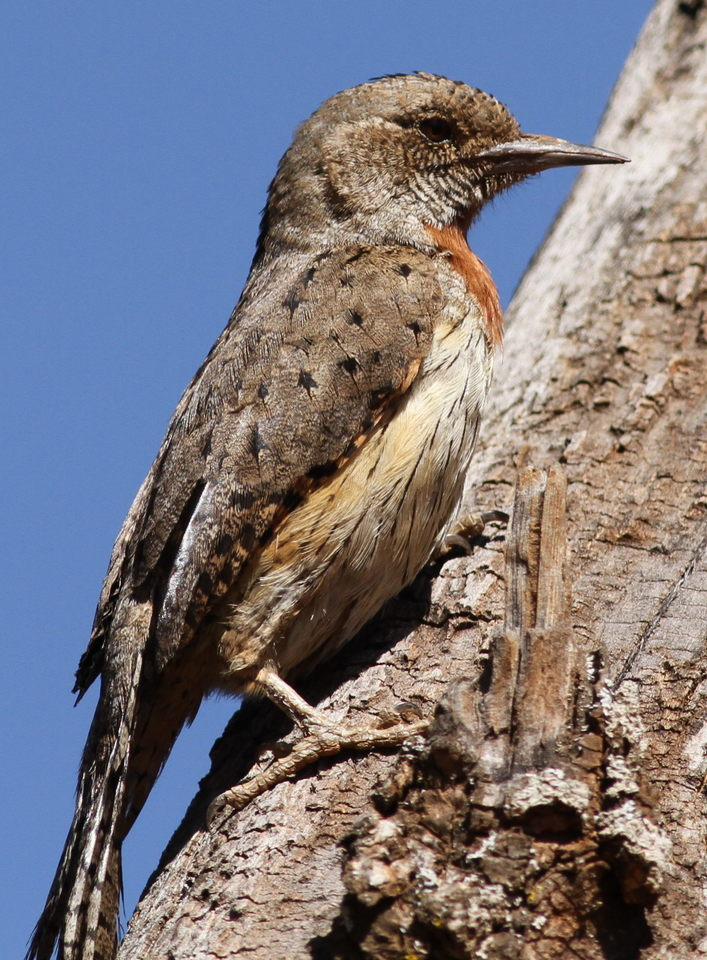
- Jynx ruficollis ruficollis in South Africa

Conservation status
- Least Concern (IUCN 3.1)

Scientific classification
- Kingdom: Animalia
- Phylum: Chordata
- Class: Aves
- Order: Piciformes
- Family: Picidae
- Genus: Jynx
- Species: J. ruficollis

Binomial name
- Jynx ruficollis Wagler, 1830
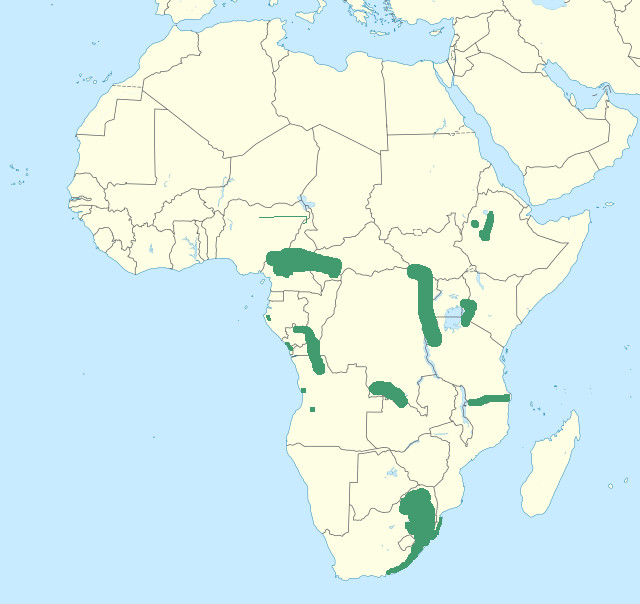
- Range map Resident

= Red-throated wryneck =

Species of bird from sub-Saharan Africa

The red-throated wryneck (Jynx ruficollis), also known as the rufous-necked wryneck or red-breasted wryneck, is a species of wryneck in the woodpecker family closely related to the Eurasian wryneck. Its three subspecies are resident in much of sub-Saharan Africa in open habitats with some trees. It is a slim, elongated bird about 19 cm (7.5 in) in length, with a small head, fine bill, long fan-shaped tail and cryptic plumage intricately patterned in greys and browns. The sexes look similar, although males are slightly larger. The diet of the adults and young is almost entirely ants at all stages of their life cycles. The call of the red-throated wryneck is a series of repeated harsh, shrill notes. When threatened, a bird will twist its neck and head in a snake-like manner while making a hissing sound, presumably to deter predators.

The red-throated wryneck nests in pre-existing holes, usually in trees, preferring old barbet or woodpecker nests. The unlined nest cavity is usually 3–4 m (10–13 ft) above the ground, and the clutch is typically three or four white eggs, laid at one-day intervals. Both sexes incubate the eggs for 12–15 days until the blind, naked chicks hatch. The chicks are fed by both adults for 25–26 days until they fledge. There are usually two broods. The red-throated wryneck has a very extensive range, and its population is large and increasing. For this reason, it is evaluated as a species of least concern by the International Union for Conservation of Nature (IUCN).

== Taxonomy and etymology ==
The woodpeckers are an ancient bird family consisting of three subfamilies, the wrynecks, the piculets and the true woodpeckers, Picinae. DNA sequencing and phylogenetic analysis show that the wrynecks are a sister clade to other woodpeckers including the Picinae and probably diverged early from the rest of the family.

The wryneck subfamily Jynginae has one genus, Jynx, introduced in 1758 by Swedish naturalist Carl Linnaeus in the 10th edition of his Systema Naturae. It contains two species, the Eurasian wryneck, J. torquilla, and the red-throated wryneck, J. ruficollis. The two wrynecks form a superspecies that probably separated early in their evolution from the piculets, although there has subsequently been only limited divergence between the Jynx species.

The red-throated wryneck was first identified by German ornithologist Johann Georg Wagler in 1830. It is also known as the rufous-necked wryneck or red-breasted wryneck. The genus name Jynx is from the Ancient Greek name for the Eurasian wryneck, ιυγξ, iunx, and ruficollis is from the Latin rufus, "rufous" and collum "neck". The English "wryneck" refers to the habit of birds in this genus of twisting and writhing their necks when agitated. It was first recorded in 1585.

The red-throated wryneck has three subspecies:

- Jynx ruficollis ruficollis (Wagler, 1830), the nominate subspecies found in southeastern Gabon, southwest to eastern Uganda, southwestern Kenya, northern Tanzania, northern Angola, northwestern Zambia, Mozambique, Eswatini and eastern South Africa.
- J. r. aequatorialis (Ruppell, 1842), the highlands of Ethiopia. Also known as the Ethiopian wryneck.
- J. r. pulchricollis (Hartlaub, 1884), in Nigeria, Cameroon, South Sudan and northwestern Uganda. Also known as the bar-throated wryneck.

=== Fossil record ===
The woodpecker family appears to have diverged from other Piciformes about fifty million years ago, and a 2017 study considered that the split between Jynx and other woodpeckers occurred about 22.5 million years ago. A fossil dating from the early Miocene, more than twenty million years ago, consisting of the distal end of a tarsometatarsus had some Jynx-like features, but was classed as an early piculet. By the Pliocene (five million years ago) woodpeckers were similar to those now extant. Fossil wrynecks are known from Europe in the Pleistocene, between 2.6 million and 11,700 years ago.

== Description ==
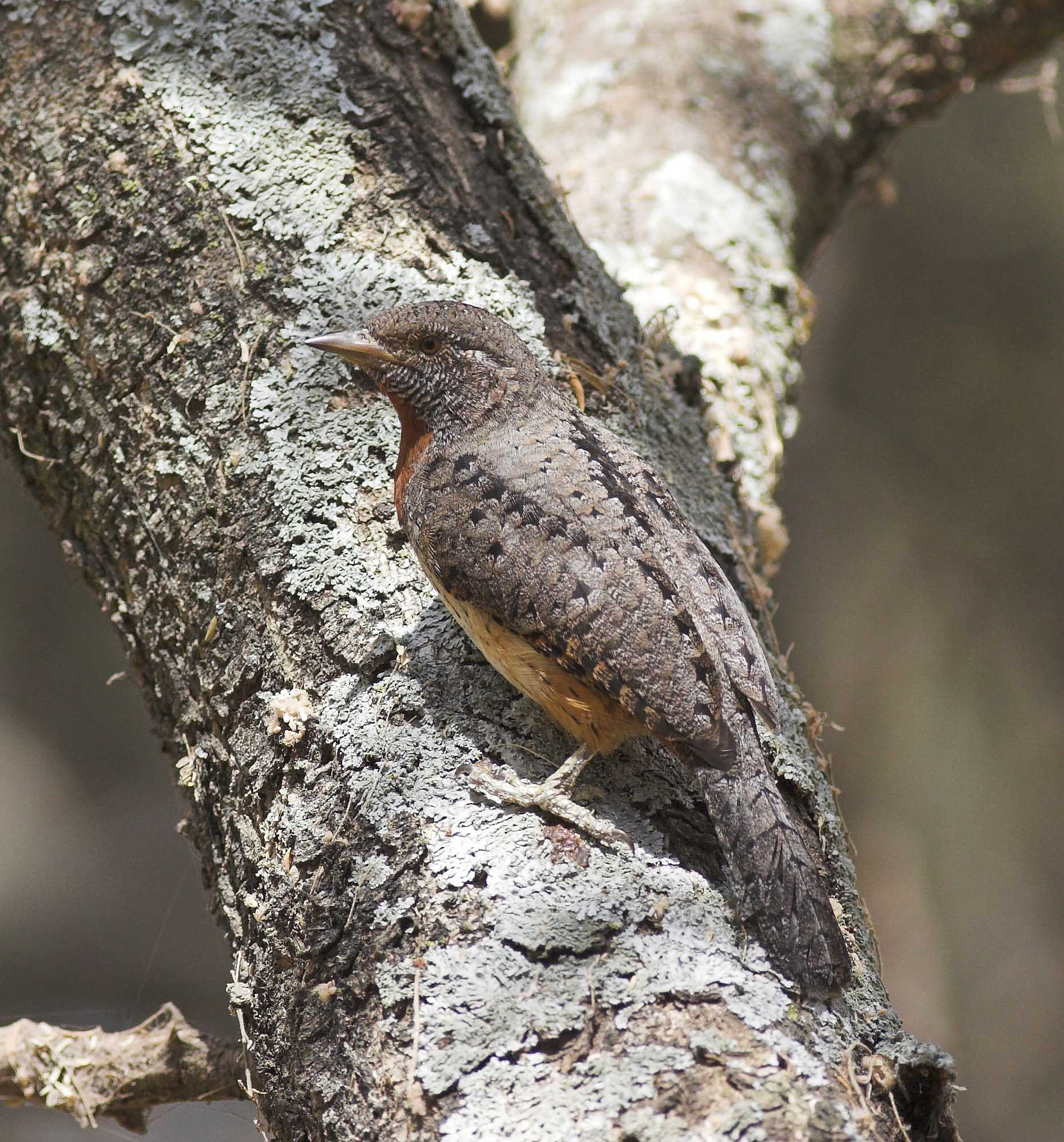
J. r. aequatorialis in Ethiopia

The red-throated wryneck grows to about 19 cm (7.5 in) in length. The sexes are very similar in appearance, and cannot be distinguished in the field, but the male averages 2–3% larger than the female, has a shorter tail, and is heavier at 52–59 g (1.8–2.1 oz) against her 46–52 g (1.6–1.8 oz). It is a slim, elongated bird with a small head, fine bill, long fan-shaped tail and a body shape unlike that of a typical woodpecker.

The overall impression is of cryptic plumage patterned with greys, browns and black. The upperparts and head are brown, barred and mottled in dark shades, and the rump and upper tail coverts are grey with speckles of brown and black. The chin, throat and breast of the subspecies Jynx ruficollis ruficollis are red, and the lower breast and belly are white with some dark streaks; there is a cinnamon tint to the flanks and the underneath of the tail. The wings are brown above and more buff-toned below. The grey bill is long and thin, the irides are chestnut, and the legs are grey. As with all woodpeckers, the first and fourth toes point backwards and the second and third point forwards, a good arrangement for clinging to vertical surfaces. Young birds resemble adults after 20 days, but are darker and more barred above, and lightly barred below with a smaller and darker red patch.

The three subspecies differ in appearance, mainly in the extent of red on the breast. In Jynx ruficollis ruficollis the red extends from the chin to the chest, whereas in J. r. aequatorialis it extends further down the breast, and there is a more cinnamon tinge to the flanks. J. r. pulchricollis has a brown-barred white chin and upper throat, and its red patch is darker and confined to its lower throat and upper breast. This race also has more rufous upperparts.

The two wrynecks cannot be confused with any other species, but some Eurasian birds may winter within the range of red-throated wryneck. The African species, compared to its migratory cousin, differs in its usually obvious red throat, larger size, overall browner appearance and the lack of a dark streak through the eye.

=== Moult ===
Most woodpeckers have only one moult as soon as breeding has finished, but wrynecks have a partial moult prior to breeding, and also replace their tail feathers in a different sequence from true woodpeckers since they have no need to retain central tail feathers for support, as is required by their arboreal relatives. Details of the moult can be complex and variable, and ageing wrynecks from their plumage appearance can be challenging.

=== Vocalisations ===
The call of the red-throated wryneck is a series of repeated harsh, shrill notes kweek-kwik-kwee-quee, usually slower than the call of the Eurasian wryneck. It is a far-carrying territorial call given from a prominent perch. There is also a peegh alarm call followed by a repeated harsh krok. Young in the nest make wheezing squeaks initially, later a repeated buzzing tsch. There is a quiet "click" call given as an alarm or pre-roosting. All calls are given by both sexes, but the male's kweek call is lower pitched than that of the female.

Wrynecks do not drum like woodpeckers, but may tap near the nest hole or on branches, apparently as a displaced aggression activity during interactions between two birds.

== Distribution and habitat ==
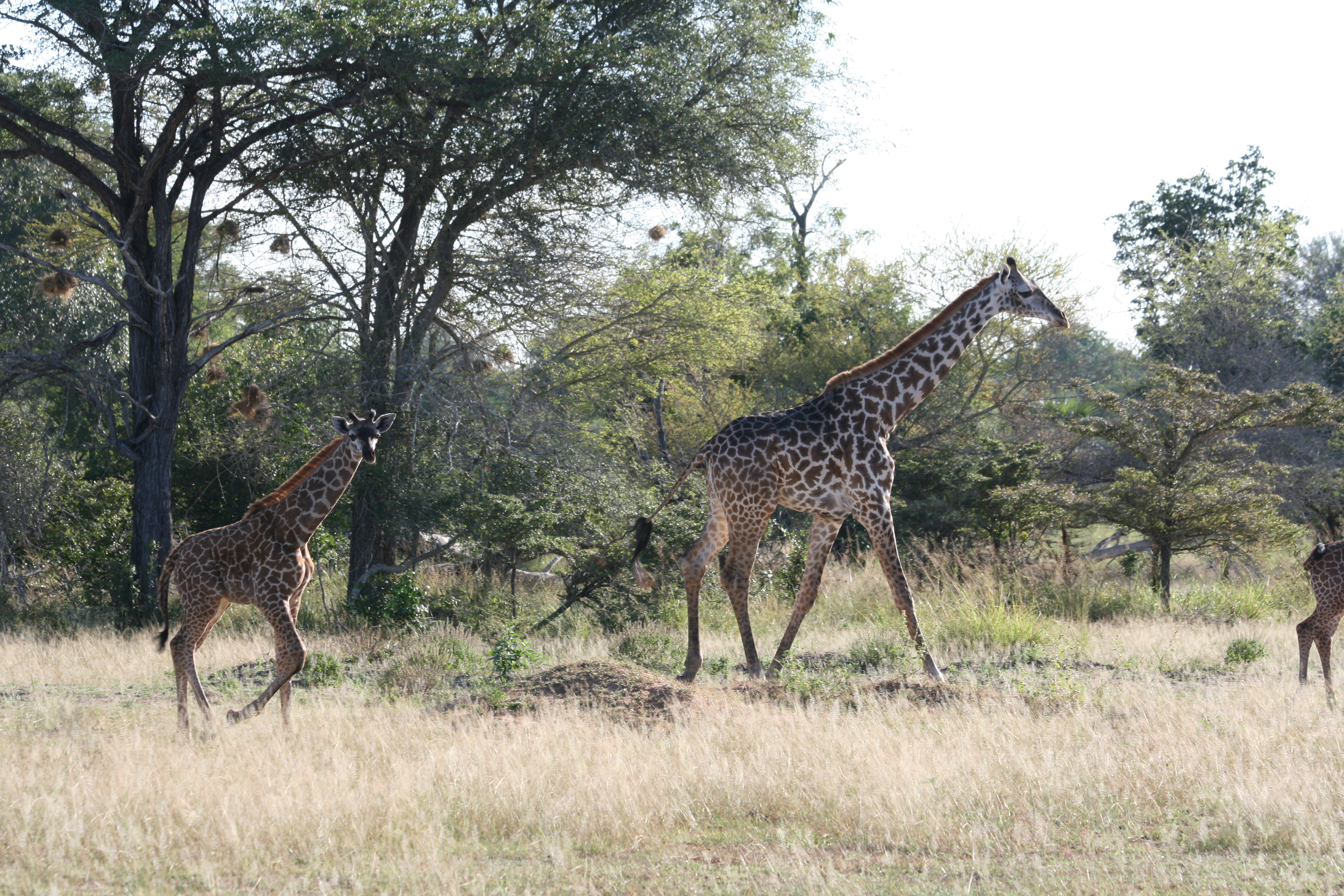
Miombo woodland in Tanzania

The rufous-necked wryneck has a distribution confined to sub-Saharan Africa. It occurs in about 20 countries in disjunct areas ranging from Nigeria, Cameroon, Central African Republic and Ethiopia in the north down to South Africa and Eswatini in the south. It is not truly migratory, although there may be local movements and post-breeding dispersal. It is a vagrant to Sudan, South Sudan and Zimbabwe, and an occasional non-breeding visitor to Lesotho.

The typical habitat is open grassland with trees, particularly acacia and also miombo woodlands, but it is also found in other semi-open woodland, such as forest edges and clearing. It will use man-made habitats such as farmland, parks and gardens as long as there are trees present, which can include introduced eucalyptus and conifers.

It occurs at altitudes from 600 metres (2,000 ft) to 3,300 metres (10,800 ft). It is found up to 1,550 metres (5,090 ft) in South Africa and mainly between 1,400–2,500 metres (4,600–8,200 ft) in Kenya.

== Behaviour ==
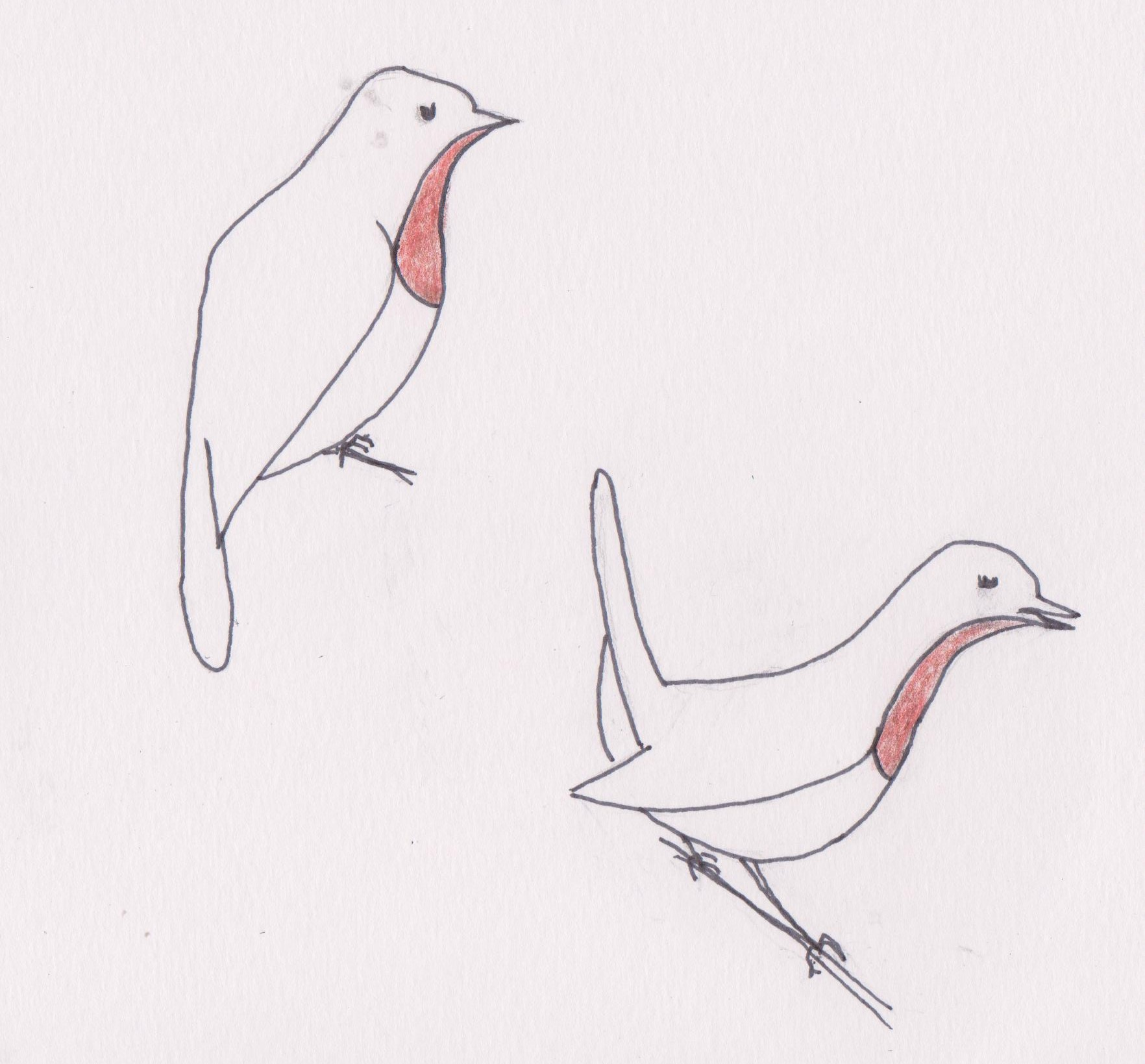
Posture when relaxed (upper left) and when displaying

The red-throated wryneck normally perches upright on a branch with its tail and wings pointing vertically down and its head pulled into its shoulders, although when it calls it raises its head and stretches its neck out. When displaying at another wryneck, it leans forward with its tail pointing vertically upright and its bill raised while it calls loudly and sways from side to side. Like its Eurasian cousin, when threatened the red-throated wryneck will twist its neck and head in a snake-like manner while making a hissing sound, presumably to deter predators.

Wrynecks fly by alternating powered flaps with glides on closed wings, giving the bouncing flight appearance typical of woodpeckers.

Pairs of wrynecks are territorial, particularly in the breeding season, one study showing territory sizes from 8–24 hectares (20–59 acres), mean 17 hectares (42 acres). All territories included clumps of trees. Territories are advertised throughout the year by calling from prominent perches, mainly by the male.

The red-throated wryneck feeds almost entirely on ants, their larvae, pupae and eggs, although termites and other small invertebrates are occasionally taken, prey items being gleaned with its long sticky tongue. The young are fed the same mostly ant-based diet. This wryneck is a solitary feeder, and 90% of its foraging is on the ground, probing into ant hills. When birds feed in trees, they pick prey off the vegetation but do not excavate.

== Breeding ==
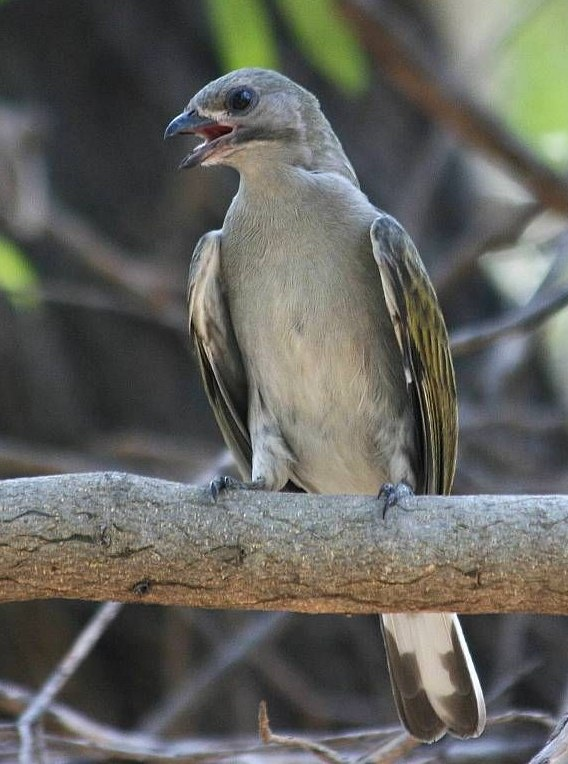
The lesser honeyguide is a brood parasite of red-throated wryneck nests.

As with the Eurasian species, the red-throated wryneck nests in pre-existing holes, usually in trees. They do not excavate cavities themselves, but they may enlarge a hole if the wood is soft enough; no nesting material is added. Old barbet and woodpecker nests are preferred, although holes in fence posts and nest boxes are also used. The wryneck competes with other species for suitable sites, notably the crested barbet. The nest is usually 3–4 m (10–13 ft) above the ground, with a cavity that is typically 300 mm (12 in) deep, and at least 300 m (980 ft) from neighbouring nests. Nests may be reused in subsequent years, in one case in alternation with a pair of violet-backed starlings, and also as winter roosts.

The clutch is between one and five, usually three or four, cream-white eggs, laid at one-day intervals. They measure 22 mm × 16.5 mm (0.87 in × 0.65 in) and weigh about 3.25 g (0.115 oz). Both sexes incubate the eggs for 12–15 days until hatching. The chicks are initially pink, naked and blind, but after about eight days their eyes open, and their feathers are growing. The chicks are fed by both adults for 25–26 days until they fledge; they hiss and make snake-like head movements if intruders visit the nest. There are usually two broods, although up to four have been recorded. The young become independent about two weeks after fledging. The timing of breeding varies across Africa, nesting taking place somewhere in every month except June and July. In South Africa, 57% of nests were successful and 40% of eggs produced fledged young.

A single claim of hybridisation between the two Jynx wrynecks reported from Cameroon was subsequently considered to involve an aberrant red-throated wryneck.

== Parasites and predators ==
The red-throated wryneck is a host of at least two Ischnoceran lice, Penenirmus serrilimbus and Brueelia straminea, and the Leucocytozoon L. sqamatus.

The wryneck's nests are visited by brood parasitic honeyguides, especially the lesser honeyguide. The adult honeyguide does not remove the host's eggs or chicks, but its monitoring of active nests may attract other predators. Once it has hatched, the honeyguide nestling will kill the host chicks. Chicks may also be killed if a crested barbet pair take over a wryneck nest for their own use.

Although the two wrynecks breed or winter over much of Europe, Asia and Africa, their predators have been little studied outside the European breeding range of Jynx torquilla, where nests may be raided by snakes for eggs and young, and the main avian threat to adult wrynecks is Accipiter hawks.

== Status ==
The red-throated wryneck has an extremely large range, and its population is large and increasing. For this reason, it is evaluated as a species of least concern by the International Union for Conservation of Nature. In South Africa it is locally common, and the range has expanded due to introduction of non-native trees to formerly unwooded grassland areas.

== Cited texts ==
- Gorman, Gerard (2014). Woodpeckers of the World. Helm Photographic Guides. London: Christopher Helm. ISBN 978-1-4081-4715-3.
- Gorman, Gerard (2022). The Wryneck. Exeter: Pelagic. ISBN 978-1-78427-288-3.
