= The Syracusan Bride leading Wild Animals in Procession to the Temple of Diana =

Painting by Frederic Leighton

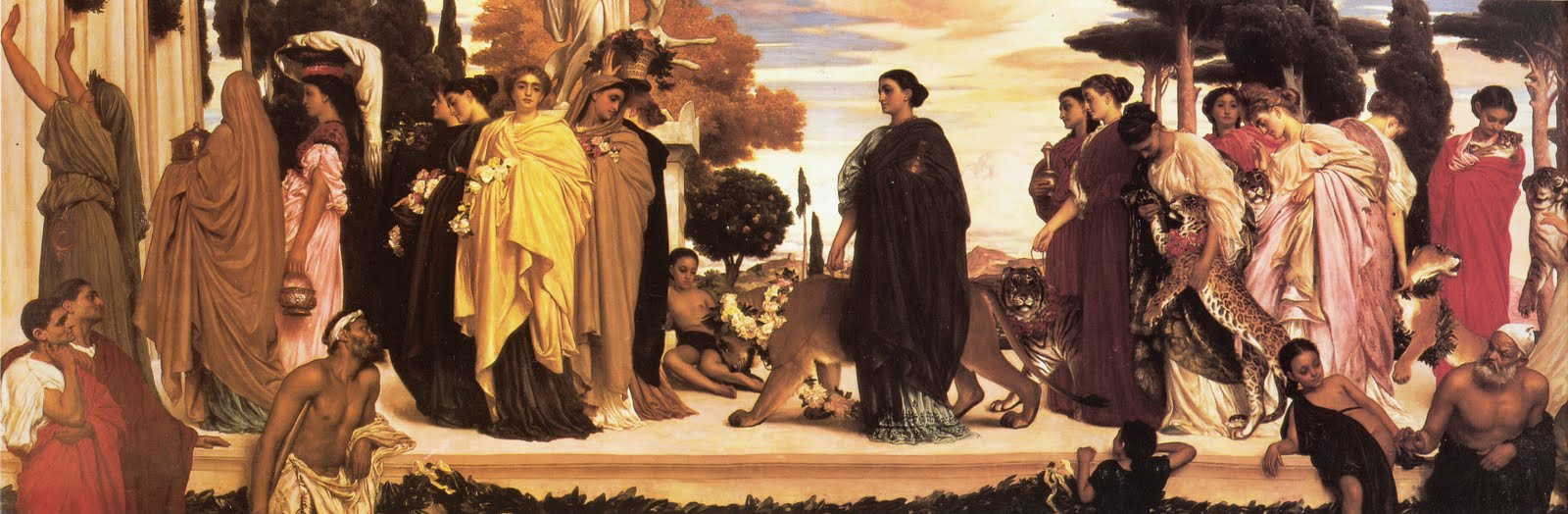
Syracusan Bride, 1866

The Syracusan Bride Leading Wild Animals in Procession to the Temple of Diana, also known as A Syracusan Bride Leading Wild Beasts in Procession to the Altar of Diana, is an oil painting by the English artist Frederic Leighton, which was first exhibited, to a favourable reception, at the Royal Academy of Arts in 1866.

== Description ==
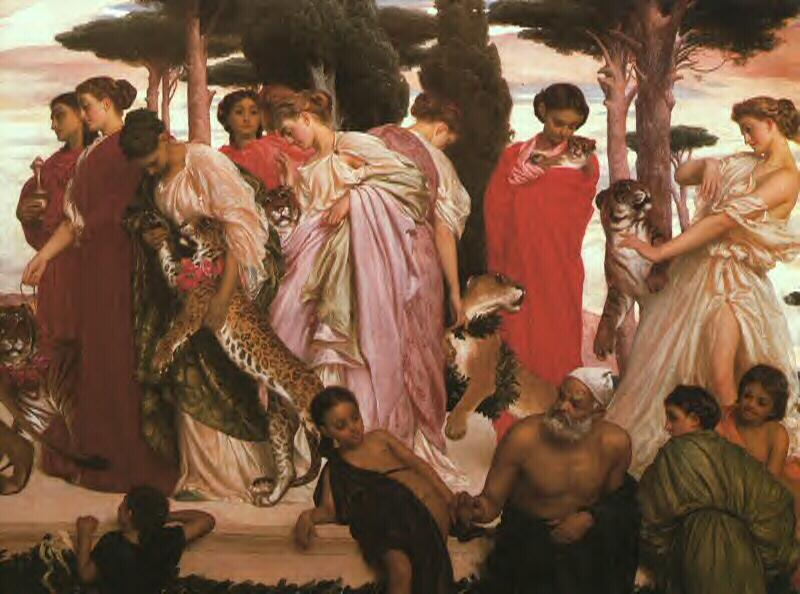
Syracusan Bride (detail)

A terrace of white marble, whose line is reflected and repeated by the line of white clouds in the sky, affords the setting for the figures of the procession. The Syracusan bride leads a lioness, and these are followed by a train of maidens and wild beasts. The procession is seen approaching the door of the temple, and a statue of Diana.

== Background ==
The subject was suggested by a passage in the second Idyll of Theocritus. "One day came Anaxo daughter of Eubulus our way, came a-basket-bearing in procession to the temple of Artemis, with a ring of many beasts about her, a lioness one." Sketches for portions of the picture and the squared tracing for the complete design can be seen in the Leighton House Collection. The full-length portrait of Mrs. James Guthrie was exhibited the same year as this second processional picture, which appeared on the walls of the Academy eleven years after the Cimabue's Madonna. The head of the central figure, the Bride, Leighton painted from Mrs. Guthrie.

== Appraisal ==
The Syracusan Bride was exhibited at the Royal Academy of Arts in 1866 and in the Paris International Exhibition in 1868. Russell Barrington, writing in 1906, praised the "richness of arrangement combined with the fair aerial atmosphere appropriate to a Grecian scene".

== Sources ==
Attribution:

- Barrington, Russell (1906). The Life, Letters and Work of Frederic Baron Leighton of Stretton. Vol. 2. London: George Allen, Ruskin House. pp. 10–11, 15, 124–125, 191, 384.
- Edmonds, J. M. (1912). The Greek Bucolic Poets: Theocritus, Bion, Moschus. (Loeb Classical Library). London: William Heinemann; New York: The Macmillan Co. p. 31.
- Staley, Edgcumbe (1906). Lord Leighton of Stretton. London: The Walter Scott Publishing Co., Ltd.; New York: Charles Scribner's Sons. pp. 70–71, 219–220.
