= Eclogue 8 =

Pastoral poem by Virgil

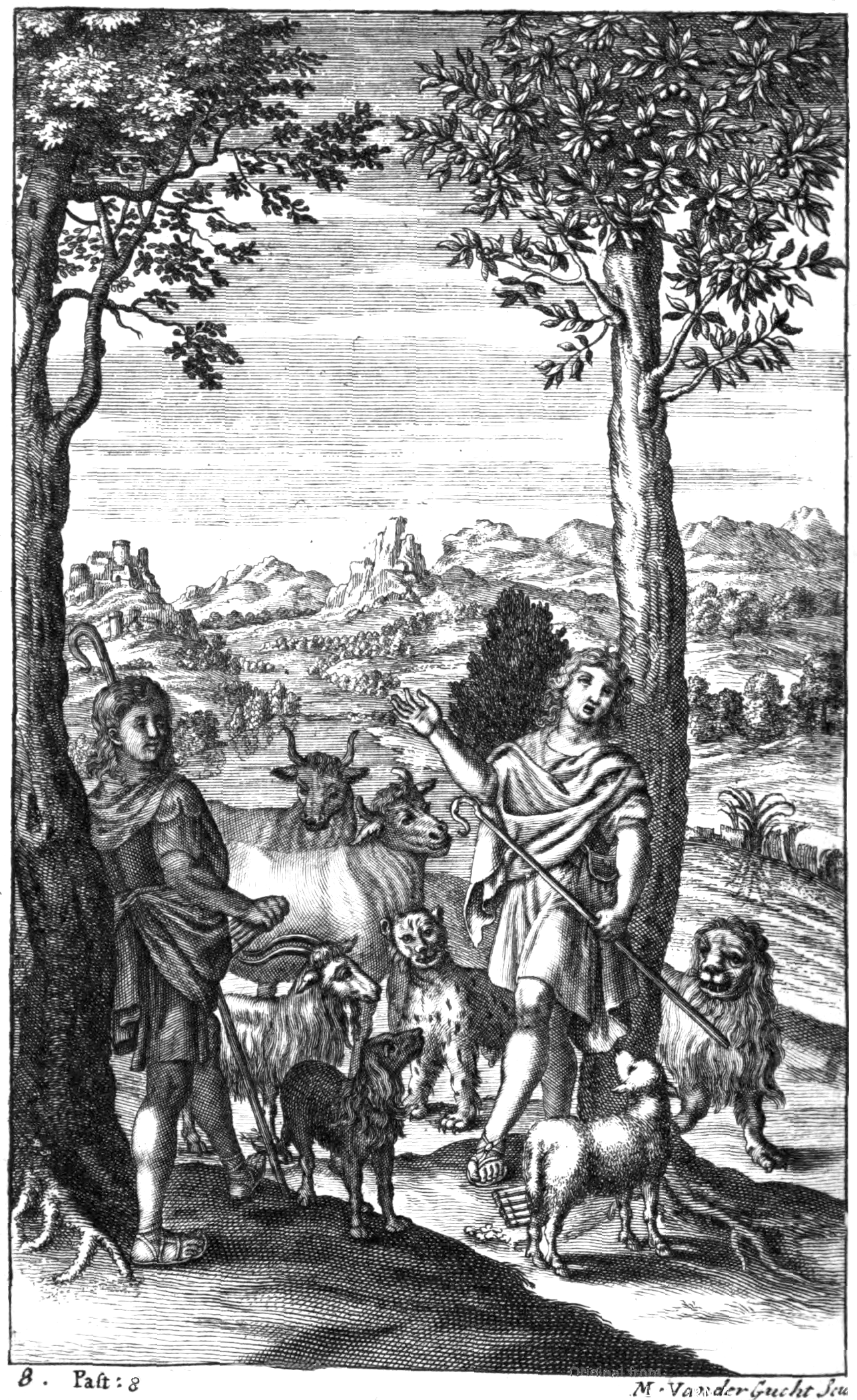
Engraving for Dryden's Virgil, 1709

Eclogue 8 (Ecloga VIII; Bucolica VIII), also titled Pharmaceutria ('The Sorceress'), is a pastoral poem by the Latin poet Virgil, one of his book of ten Eclogues. After an introduction, containing an address to an unnamed dedicatee, there follow two love songs of equal length sung by two herdsmen, Damon and Alphesiboeus. One is the song of a love-sick young man, whose girlfriend Nysa is marrying another man, Mopsus. The second is the song of a woman who, with the help of her servant Amaryllis, is performing a magic rite to try to entice her beloved Daphnis back from the city.

The poem is believed to have been written in 39 BC, and the dedicatee is usually thought to be Virgil's patron Gaius Asinius Pollio, whose military exploits are alluded to in verses 6–13.

This eclogue is mainly based on Theocritus's Idyll 2, but the first song also includes elements from Idylls 1, 3, and 11.

== Summary ==
- 1 An anonymous narrator says he wishes to tell of the songs of two outstanding singers, Damon and Aphesiboeus, to whom cows, lynxes, and even rivers listen in amazement. He breaks off (lines 6–13) to address an unnamed dedicatee, whom he imagines at this moment crossing the rocks of the river Timavus or skirting the coast of Illyricum, asking him to accept the dedication. He continues by relating how Damon began his song at dawn, leaning on a smooth olive tree.

- 17 Damon's song is that of a nameless young man, who has been jilted by his beloved, Nysa. The young man praises the Arcadian mountain Maenalus and the god Pan, who listen to lovers' complaints. He explains how Nysa is to marry Mopsus, a most unequal match; he addresses Mopsus and advises him to prepare for the wedding. Then he addresses Nysa and chides her for despising him. He reminds her how he fell in love with her when she visited his mother's garden when he was only a child. Now he knows the cruelty of the god Love. It was the god Love, and his equally cruel mother (Venus), who persuaded Medea to murder her own children. Now wolves will run away from sheep, oak trees will bear apples, and all sorts of other impossible things will happen. He says farewell to the woods and declares he will throw himself off a high cliff into the sea.

- 62 The narrator now asks the Muses to help him recount the song of Alphesiboeus.

- 64 Alphesiboeus sings the song of an unnamed woman, who is making a magic spell to bring home her beloved Daphnis. She instructs her maid to decorate the altar and burn herbs and incense. She declares that songs have the power to bring down the moon, and enabled Circe to turn Ulysses' companions into pigs. Three times she surrounds the altar with three-colour thread; and three times she carries an effigy around it. She instructs her maid to tie three colours into three knots. She describes how the clay she is holding grows hard and the wax soft in the same fire; she prays her love for Daphnis will do the same. She instructs the maid to sprinkle meal and burn bay leaves. She prays that Daphnis may be overcome by love, in the same way as a young cow is overcome with love for a bull, forgetting to return home at night. She buries some clothes left behind by Daphnis at the threshold of the house. She uses some magic herbs from Pontus which she says she was given by Moeris, an accomplished magician. Then she bids Amaryllis to take the ashes and throw them behind her into a stream; though Daphnis cares nothing for songs, she says she will bring him back by magic. Suddenly the maid notices that the ashes have burst into flame, which she accepts as a good omen. The woman agrees that it is certainly a sign, and the dog Hylax is barking at the threshold. Should she believe Daphnis is coming back? Or is she just imagining a dream?

== The addressee ==
The introduction to the poem narrates how at the beginning of the day Damon and Alphesiboeus sang in competition with each other. In the middle of this narrative is an eight-line address to an unnamed person, who is identified only by various indications. First, Virgil imagines him sailing past the "rocks of Timavus" (a river at the very north of the Adriatic sea) and the Illyrian coast. He looks forward to celebrating the addressee's achievements and poems, which alone are worthy of the Sophoclean stage. Virgil asks him to accept the poems which he has begun on the addressee's command as ivy to be wreathed round the addressee's head along with the laurels of victory.

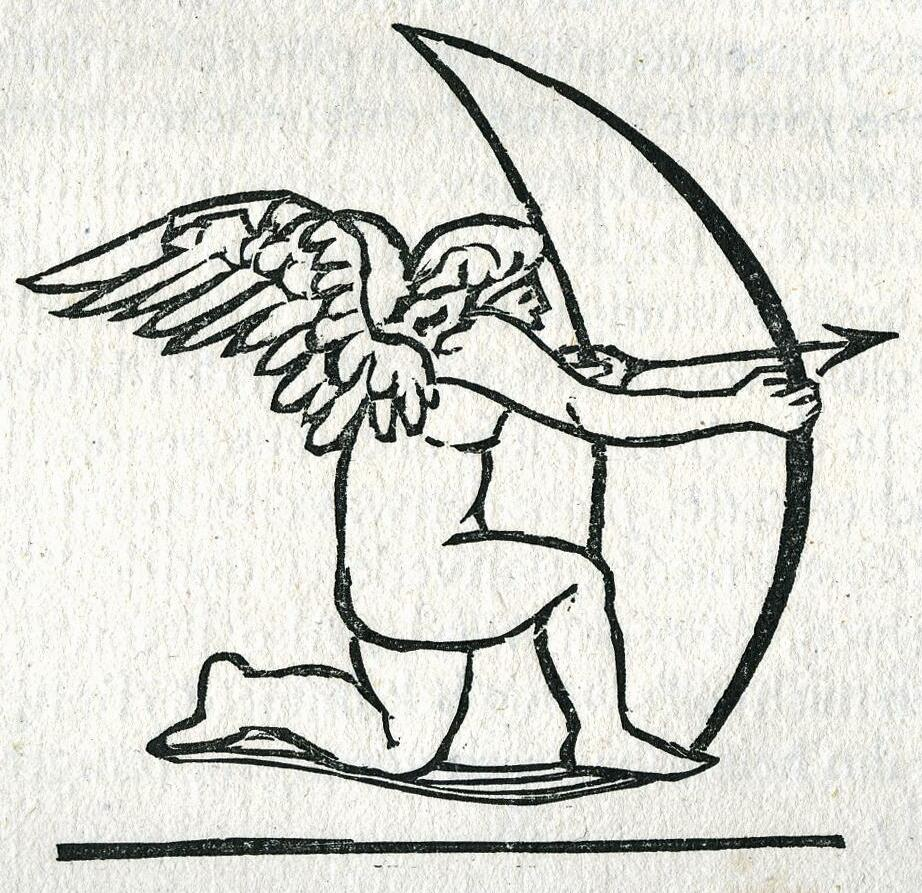
Woodcut by Aristide Maillol, 1926, illustrating Eclogue 8: "Now know I what Love is; it is among savage rocks that he is produced by Tmarus, or Rhodope, or the Garamantes at earth's end; no child of lineage or blood like ours." (43–5)

From early times these indications have been taken as describing Virgil's patron Gaius Asinius Pollio. He is mentioned by name in Eclogue 3 for his liking for bucolic poetry, and again, as consul in 40 BC, in Eclogue 4. Pollio is also known to have written tragedies.

Some scholars, however, such as Bowersock (1971), have proposed that the addressee is not Pollio but Octavian, who fought a campaign in Illyricum beginning in 35 BC; he is also said to have composed a tragedy on the subject of Ajax. But since Bowersock's article, several other scholars have argued against this view. For example, Thibodeau (2006) points that Virgil's description seems to describe not a voyage from Pollio's province to Rome (as some scholars have thought), but one going to his province, and he shows that it is perfectly plausible for Pollio to have set off for his province in 39 BC from Aquileia near the Timavus river. To suppose that the addressee is Octavian, on the other hand, creates considerable difficulties in chronology. There is therefore no need to doubt that Pollio is meant here and that the date of Eclogue 8 is 39 BC.

The words in the 7th line of the dedication (line 11) (a te principium, tibi desinam 'from you was/is my beginning, with you I shall end') go back to Homer's Iliad 9.97 (flattering words spoken by Nestor to Agamemnon). They also recall line 60 of Eclogue 3 (ab Iove principium 'from Jupiter (is) the beginning'). According to Greenough, this poem has every appearance of an epilogue, and perhaps was originally intended to stand at the end of the book.

In 2014 it was noticed that the initial letters of the dedication (lines 6 to 13) contain an acrostic: TV SI ES ACI (i.e. accipe) 'if you are the one, accept!' Possibly this instruction is addressed only to Pollio, though Neil Adkin, who discovered the acrostic, believes that Virgil wished to leave the addressee ambiguous. Adkin suggests that the ambiguous words oram legis (line 7) 'you skirt the coast' or 'you read the margin' provide a clue to the presence of the acrostic, just as the words primi lege litoris oram provide a clue to an acrostic FIAS in the dedication to Maecenas in Georgics 2.44.

== The two songs ==
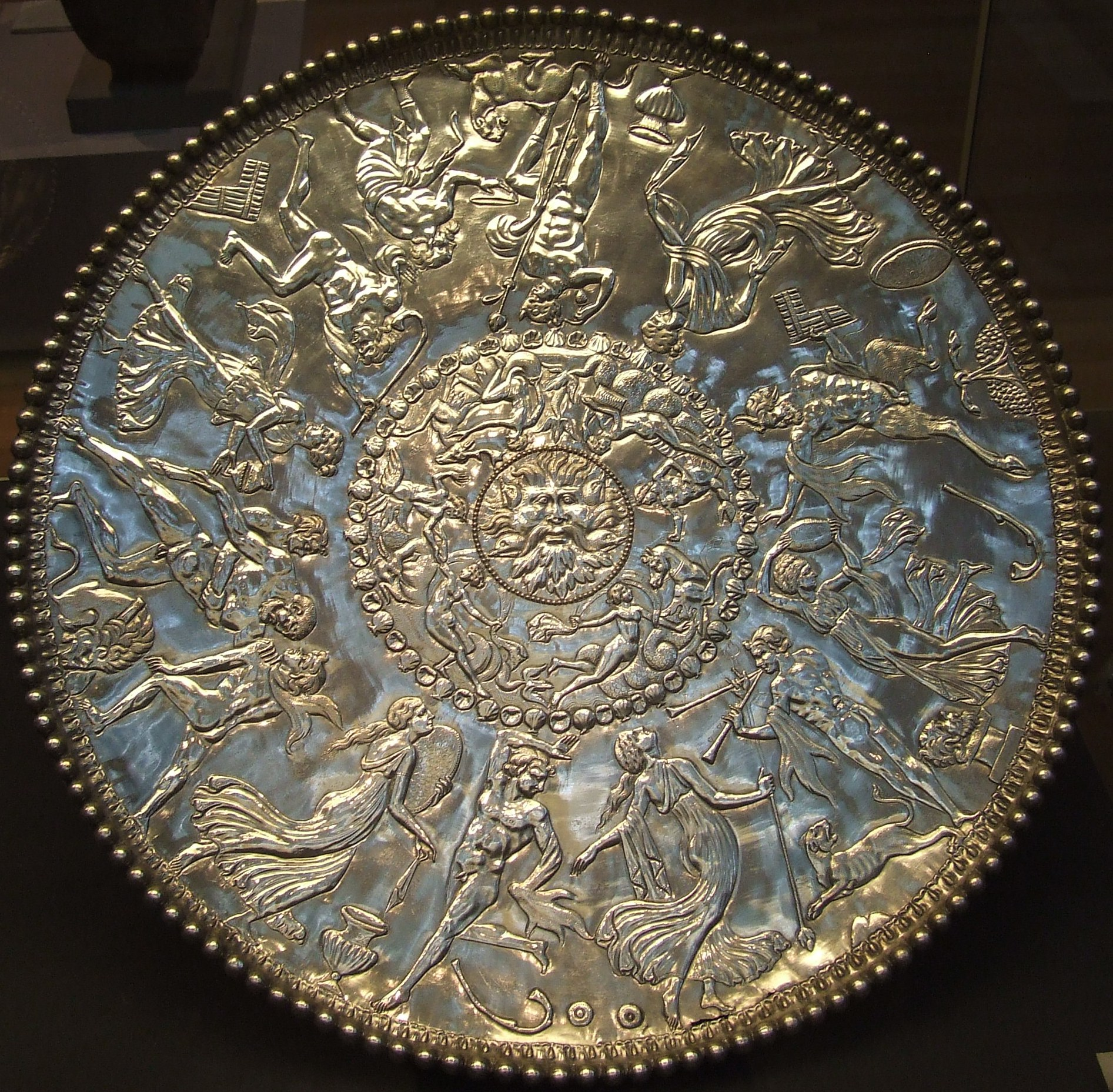
The so-called Neptune Plate, part of the Mildenhall Treasure, 4th century AD. According to E. V. Rieu, "[T]he artist might almost have had the Eighth Eclogue in mind."

The 16-line introduction is followed by two songs, one sung by Damon and the other by Alphesiboeus. The two songs in the eclogue are loosely based on Theocritus's Idyll 2. In this idyll a woman called Simaetha makes a magic spell to attract her lover Delphis to return to her. At the end of the spell, after dismissing her maid Thestylis, Simaetha sings a second song of 12 slightly longer stanzas, telling the Moon about how she had fallen in love with Delphis when she saw him one day coming from the gymnasium, how they became lovers, and how she had learnt that he had now fallen in love with someone else. Both songs in Idyll 2 are broken up by refrains. The order of the songs is reversed in Eclogue 8, and the complaint is put into the mouth of a man; the content is also changed. Another change made by Virgil is to set the songs in the countryside, whereas Theocritus's Idyll 2 is set in a city.

The two songs in Eclogue 8 are clearly designed to match each other, and thus like the songs in Eclogues 3, 5, 7 and 9 are amoebaean. Both have the same number of lines (if line 76 is omitted) and almost exactly the same pattern and number of stanzas. Both songs start with a command (nascere 'be born!' and effer 'take out!'); both have the word coniugis 'of my spouse, of my partner' at the beginning of line 2 or 3. The second stanza of each song speaks of the power of Arcadia and the power of songs respectively. The last two lines of the third stanza of both songs consist of commands. Stanzas 3 and 8 of the first song speak of impossible things that will happen in consequence of Nysa's marriage, while stanza 3 and 7 of the second song speak of impossible things that magic can do. The first song references the story of Medea (47–49), the other the story of her aunt Circe (70); Medea is also implied in the references to the magic herbs of Pontus (95–96). In both songs, the central stanza has a vivid picture describing the emotion of falling in love.

Damon's song, like Simaetha's first song, has 9 stanzas, each followed by a refrain, but the stanzas are of varying lengths: 4, 3, 5, 4, 5, 3, 4, 5, 3 lines respectively. Alphesiboeus's song has almost exactly the same pattern, except that in the manuscript tradition it contains an extra refrain (line 76), dividing the 3rd stanza, making ten stanzas of 4, 3, 3, 2, 4, 5, 3, 5, 3, 4 lines. To make Virgil's two songs match each other more exactly some editors, such as Mynors in the Oxford Classical Text of 1969, add an extra refrain in the first song (line 28a); however, other editors remove line 76 instead. If the latter solution is taken, the magic spell in Virgil, just as the magic spell in Theocritus, has nine stanzas, an appropriate number for magic (cf. lines 73–78, where the number 3 x 3 is emphasised). Another argument put forward by Skutsch for removing line 76 is that if it is deleted, then when Eclogue 8 is added to its pair (Eclogue 2), it makes 181 lines, the same number as when Eclogue 3 is added to its pair (Eclogue 7). Cucchiarelli (2012), however, retains line 76, arguing that in this way the number of refrains is the same as in Theocritus's magic spell (there being an extra refrain at the beginning in Theocritus, dividing the spell itself from the introduction to Idyll 2).

=== Damon's song ===
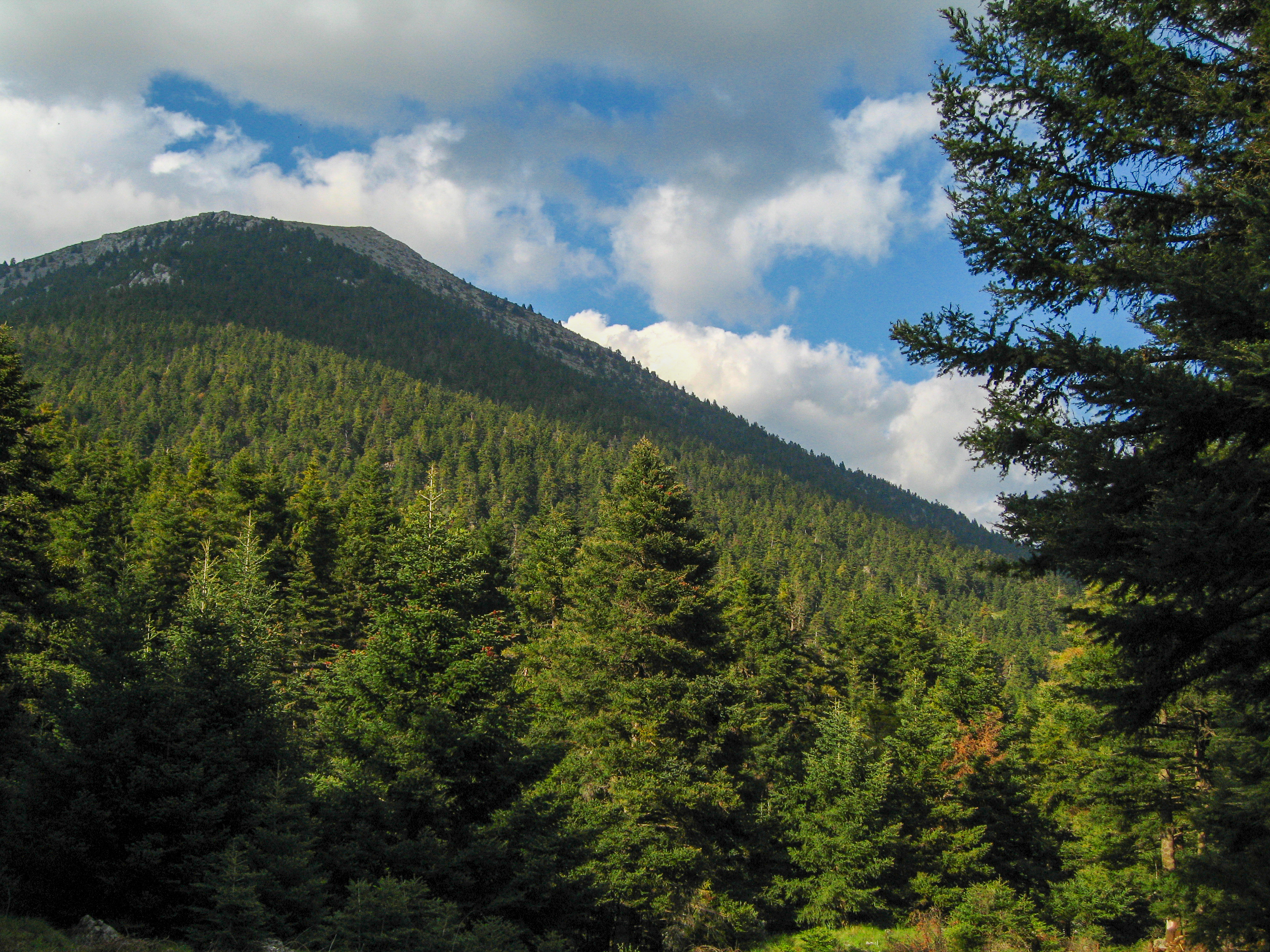
pinifer ... Maenalus "pine-bearing Maenalus" (Eclogue 10.14–15)

Damon's song is the complaint of a young man whose beloved, Nysa, is marrying another man, Mopsus. At the end of the song in his despair he declares that he is going to throw himself off a high cliff into the sea. The refrain in the first eight stanzas is "Begin the Maenalian verses with me, my pipes". The adjective "Maenalian" refers to the mountain Maenalus in Arcadia, the fabled region in Greece which Virgil chose to make the scene of his bucolic poems. After the last stanza the refrain changes to: "End the Maenalian verses now, end the verses."

The historian Thomas Babington Macaulay thought that the five lines in the central stanza of this song (37–41) were "the finest lines in the Latin language"; and he noted that Voltaire had said that they were the finest in all of Virgil's poetry. They have been translated as follows:

"I saw you, a little child, with my mother in our garden,
picking dew-wet apples (I was guide to you both).
The year beyond my eleventh had just greeted me,
now I could reach the frail branches from the ground.
As I saw you, I was lost! How a fatal madness took me!"

The song has been put together from lines of several Theocritus Idylls. Stanzas 2, 3, and 8 come from Idyll 1, stanza 1 and part of 5 from Idyll 2; stanzas 6 and 9 from Idyll 3; and part of stanza 5 from Idyll 11. Stanzas 4 and 7 are Virgil's. Virgil, however, has made modifications to the Theocritean original. For example, in the stanza quoted above, the first two lines are adapted from Theocritus 11.25–29, where the giant Polyphemus recounts leading the nymph Galatea and his mother to gather hyacinths on a hillside. By introducing a garden and apples, Virgil calls to mind the story of Acontius as told in a poem by Callimachus. The word legentem in line 38 has two potential meanings: 'picking' and 'reading', which further recalls how Cydippe in that story read the words Acontius had written on the apple. Callimachus's poem has influenced this eclogue in other ways too.

Another myth referenced in this song is that of Ariadne, who was abandoned by the unfaithful Theseus on the island of Naxos, as told in the famous poem 64 of Catullus. Line 20 echoes Catullus 64.191, while 43–45, as well as echoing Theocritus 3.15–17, also echo Catullus 64.154–57. T. Hubbard writes, “By adopting Catullus’ revision of Theocritus, Vergil acknowledges that Damon’s situation is somehow closer to Ariadne’s than to the Theocritean goatherd’s, one of abandonment by the lover rather than one of unreciprocated courtship.”

=== Alphesiboeus's song ===
The second song is the song of an unnamed woman who is performing a magic rite in order to cause her husband Daphnis to come home from the city. The refrain after the first eight stanzas is "Bring him home from the city, bring Daphnis home, my songs." In the final stanza the refrain changes to "Stop the songs now, stop them, Daphnis is coming from the city."

Just as in Damon's song, the 5-line central stanza (lines 85–89) has a description of powerful love, the word perdita! 'lost!' in the second song matching perii! 'I was lost!' in the first. It has been translated as follows:

Let such love seize Daphnis, as when a heifer, weary
with searching woods, and deep groves, for her mate
sinks down by a rill of water, in the green reeds,
lost, and not thinking of leaving till dead of night,
let such love seize him, and I not care to heal him.

The exact ritual being performed with the clay and wax is not clear, especially as the Theocritus version mentions wax only, not clay. One view, taken by the ancient commentator Servius and others, is that the singer makes two effigies, a clay one of herself which grows hard in the fire, and a wax one of Daphnis which melts. Other scholars, however, have argued that both the clay and the wax refer to Daphnis, and represent his erotic hardening with desire as well as his melting with love.

== Eclogue 2 and Eclogue 8 ==
In the chiastic structure of the Eclogues, where Eclogue 1 is paired with 9 (both about the confiscations), 2 with 8 (both songs of unrequited love), 3 with 7 (both amoebaean contests), 4 with 6 (about the future and the past of the world), and 5 with itself (the death and deification of Daphnis), Eclogue 8 is paired with Eclogue 2. Steenkamp draws attention to the very similar openings of the two poems:

formosum pastor Corydon ardebat Alexin (Ec. 2.1)
"the herdsman Corydon was burning for the handsome Alexis"

and

pastorum Musam Damonis et Alphesiboei (Ec. 8.1)
"(we will sing of) the Muse of the herdsmen Damon and Alphesiboeus"

The similarity of sound and rhythm in the first two words, and the inclusion of two names in the second half of the line shows that they clearly echo each other.

Thematically, both poems are based on Theocritus, but with changes of gender: Eclogue 2, where Corydon is in love with the boy Alexis, is adapted from Theocritus Idyll 11, where Polyphemus is in love with the nymph Galatea. Damon's song in Eclogue 9, telling of a young man's love for the girl he had hoped to marry, is based on the second half of Theocritus Idyll 2, where a woman, Simaetha, is in love with a young man. Only in Alphesiboeus's song are the genders unchanged.

All three songs tell of unrequited love, but the treatment is different in each case. In Eclogue 2, Corydon consoles himself that he will find another boy; in Damon's song, the speaker decides to commit suicide; in Alphesiboeus's song, the speaker solves her problem using a magic spell.

Some names are also common to both poems, such as Amaryllis and Daphnis (albeit playing different roles), and the god Pan, who in both poems is said to have been the first to teach men to play the panpipes (Ec. 2.32–33; Ec. 8.24). In both poems also the beloved is said to "despise" the lover (despectus Ec. 2.19; despicis Ec. 8.32).

== Acrostics ==
Several of Virgil's eclogues have been found to contain acrostics. The acrostic TV SI ES ACI 'if you are the one, accept it' in lines 6–13 has already been mentioned above. It has been suggested that another acrostic, the adjective INANIS 'empty, worthless (singular)', can be been found in lines 42–47, together with a telestic, the adjective SONTES 'guilty (plural)', in the final letters of lines 77–82. In support of the view that these acrostics are deliberate not accidental, it is argued that they are nearly symmetrically placed (one five stanzas from the beginning of its song, the other five stanzas before the end); both name a god of love (Amor and Veneris) in the second line; and one is preceded by the words me malus abstulit error 'an evil error has stolen me', the other followed by Daphnis me malus urit 'evil Daphnis is burning me'.

== Sources and further reading ==
- Adkin, N. (2014). "„Read the edge”: Acrostics in Virgil’s Sinon Episode". Acta Classica Universitatis Scientiarum Debreceniensis, 50, 45–72.
- Bowersock, G. W. (1971). "A Date in the Eighth Eclogue". Harvard Studies in Classical Philology. 75: 73–80. doi:10.2307/311217. JSTOR 311217.
- Cucchiarelli, A., & Traina, A. (2012). Publio Virgilio Marone, Le Bucoliche, introduzione e commento di Andrea Cucchiarelli, traduzione di Alfonso Traina (pp. 1-533). Carocci editore.
- Danielewicz, J. (2005). "Further Hellenistic Acrostics: Aratus and Others", Mnemosyne 58, 321‒34
- Gow, A. S. F. (ed.). (1952). Theocritus 2 Volume Set. Cambridge University Press.
- Greenough, J. B., ed. (1883). Publi Vergili Maronis: Bucolica. Aeneis. Georgica. The Greater Poems of Virgil. Vol. 1. Boston, MA: Ginn, Heath, & Co. pp. 21–5. (Public domain)
- Henkel, J. H. (2009). Writing Poems on Trees: Genre and Metapoetics in Vergil's Eclogues and Georgics (Doctoral dissertation thesis). University of North Carolina at Chapel Hill.
- Hubbard, T. (1998). The Pipes of Pan, University of Michigan Press.
- Katz, J. T.; Volk, K. (May 2006). "Erotic Hardening and Softening in Vergil's Eighth Eclogue". The Classical Quarterly. New Series. 56 (1): 169–74. doi:10.1017/S0009838806000139. JSTOR 4493395.
- Kenney, E. J. (1983). "Virgil and the Elegiac Sensibility". Illinois Classical Studies. 8 (1): 44–59. JSTOR 23062561.
- Levi, Peter (1966). "The Dedication to Pollio in Virgil's Eighth Eclogue". Hermes. 94 (1): 73–9. JSTOR 4475386.
- Macdonald, Jennifer (2005). "Structure and Allusion in Idyll 2 and Eclogue 8". Vergilius (1959–). 51: 12–31. JSTOR 41587305.
- Mankin, David (1988). "The Addressee of Virgil's Eighth Eclogue: A Reconsideration". Hermes. 116 (1): 63–76. JSTOR 4476604.
- Page, T. E., ed. (1898). P. Vergili Maronis: Bucolica et Georgica. Classical Series. London: Macmillan & Co., Ltd. pp. 155–65. (Public domain)
- Rieu, E. V. (1949). Virgil: The Pastoral Poems (A Translation of the Eclogues). Great Britain: Penguin Books Ltd. pp. 7–17.
- Skutsch, O. (1969). "Symmetry and Sense in the Eclogues". Harvard Studies in Classical Philology. 73: 153–169. doi:10.2307/311154. JSTOR 311154.
- Solodow, J. B. (1977). "Poeta Impotens: The Last Three Eclogues". Latomus, July-Sept. 1977, T. 36, Fasc. 3, pp. 757–771.
- Steenkamp, J. (2011). "The Structure of Vergil's Eclogues". Acta Classica: Proceedings of the Classical Association of South Africa. 54 (1). Classical Association of South Africa (CASA): 101–124. JSTOR 24592529.
- Tarrant, R. J. (1978). "The Addressee of Virgil's Eighth Eclogue". Harvard Studies in Classical Philology. 82: 197–9. doi:10.2307/311030. JSTOR 311030.
- Thibodeau, P. (December 2006). "The Addressee of Vergil's Eighth Eclogue". The Classical Quarterly. New Series. 56 (2): 618–623. doi:10.1017/S0009838806000668. JSTOR 4493451.
- Thompson, S. V. (n.d.) "A Telestic in Virgil's Eclogue 8.77-82". Academia.

== See also ==
- Magic in the Graeco-Roman world
