= Idyll II =

Poem

Idyll II, also called Φαρμακεύτριαι ('The Sorceresses'), is a poem by the 3rd-century BC Greek poet Theocritus, usually categorised with Idylls XIV and XV as one of his 'urban mimes'. The speaker of the poem, Simaetha, madly in love with Delphis, who has forsaken her, endeavours to subdue him to her by magic, and by invoking the Moon, in her character of Hecate, and of Selene. She tells the tale of the growth of her passion, and vows vengeance if her magic arts are unsuccessful. The scene is beneath the moonlit sky, near the town, and within sound of the sea. The characters are Simaetha, and Thestylis, her handmaid.

== Summary ==
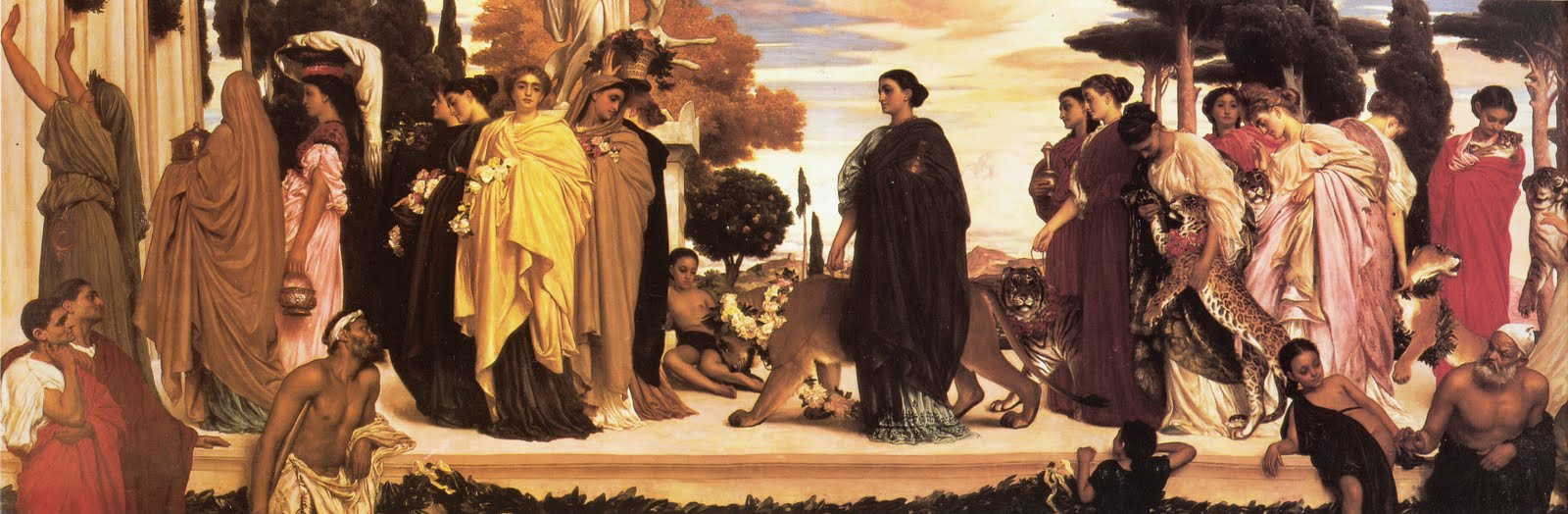
Syracusan Bride leading Wild Animals in Procession to the Temple of Diana (1866)

This monologue consists of two parts; in the first part a Coan girl named Simaetha, assisted by her maid Thestylis, lays a fire-spell upon her neglectful lover, the young athlete Delphis; in the second, when her maid goes off to smear the ashes upon his lintel, she tells the Moon how his love was won and lost. The scene lies not far from the sea, at a place where three roads meet without the city, the roads being bordered with tombs. The Moon shines in the background, and in the foreground is a wayside shrine and statue of Hecate with a little altar before it.

Upon this altar, in the first part of the rite, Simaetha burns successively barley-meal, bay-leaves, a waxen puppet, and some bran; next, the coming of the Goddess having been heralded by the distant barking of dogs and welcomes with the beating of brass, amid the holy silence that betokens her presence Simaetha pours the libations and puts up her chief prayer; lastly she burns the herb hippomanes and a piece of the fringe of her lover's cloak. The incantation which begins the spell and ends each of the nine four-line stanzas is addressed to the magic four-spoked wheel which still bears the name of the bird (iynx) that was originally bound to such wheels, and which is kept turning by Simaetha throughout the rite.

When Thestylis has withdrawn with the collected ashes in the libation-bowl, her mistress begins a soliloquy. This consists of two halves, the first of which is divided, by a refrain addressed to the listening Moon, into stanzas, all, except the last, of five lines; then instead of the refrain comes the climax of the story, put briefly in two lines, and the second half begins, with its tale of desertion. In the latter half the refrain is absent. (Note: J. M. Edmonds comments, "[T]he absence of the refrain with its lyric and romantic associations is intended to heighten the contrast between then and now, between the fulness of joy and the emptiness of despair.") Towards the end both of the first and of the second parts of the poem there is a suggestion that Simaetha only half believes in the efficacy of her spell; for she threatens that if it fails to bring back Delphis' love to her, poison shall prevent his bestowing it elsewhere.

== Mime ==
In the Loeb edition of Herodas, Sophron, and the other mime fragments, Jeffrey Rusten and Ian Cunningham define the genre thus: "[A] popular entertainment in which one actor or a small group portrayed a situation from everyday life in the lower levels of society, concentrating on depiction of character rather than on plot. Situations were occasionally borrowed from comedy. Indecency was frequent."

== Illustrations ==
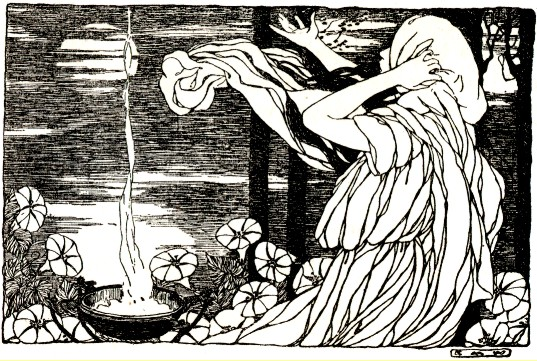
Illustration from The Idylls and Epigrams of Theocritus, Bion, and Moschus (1905)

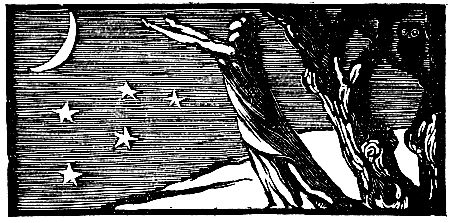
Illustration of Idyll II (1929)

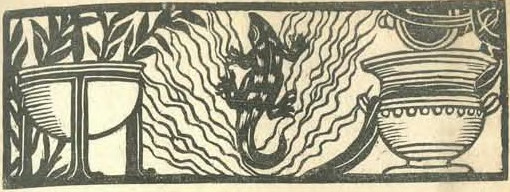
Illustration by Adolfo de Carolis (1925)

== See also ==
- Love magic
- Love potion
- Magic in the Greco-Roman world
- Eclogue 8
- Dido

== Sources ==
- Miles, Sarah (2021). "Performing Mime in the Idylls of Theocritus: Metrical Mime, Drama, and the "Everyday" in Theocritus, Idylls 2, 14, 15". Brill's Companion to Theocritus. Brill's Companions to Classical Studies. Brill. pp. 154–75.
- Rusten, Jeffrey; Cunningham, I. C., eds. (2014). Characters. Herodas: Mimes. Sophron and Other Mime Fragments. Cambridge, MA: Harvard University Press. p. 183.

Attribution:

- Edmonds, J. M., ed. (1919). The Greek Bucolic Poets (3rd ed.). William Heinemann. pp. 24–39.
- Lang, Andrew, ed. (1880). Theocritus, Bion, and Moschus. London: Macmillan and Co. pp. 8–15.
