= Iynx =

Arcadian nymph – daughter of Pan and Echo

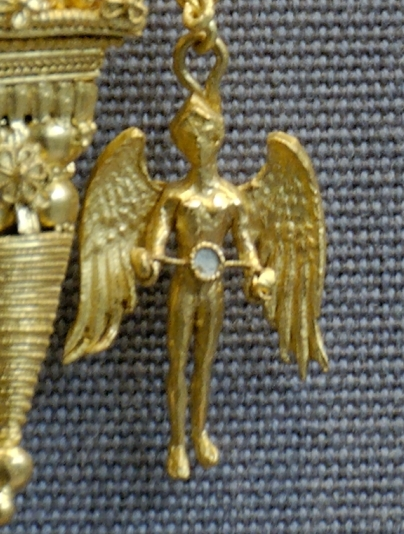
Detail of an earring showing a figure of Eros holding an iynx toy. Created in Northern Greece, c. 330–300 BC

In Greek mythology, Iynx (Ancient Greek: Ἴυγξ, romanized: Íynx) was a daughter of the god Pan and the nymph Echo. In popular myth, she used an enchantment to cast a spell on Zeus, which caused him to fall in love with Io. In consequence of this, Hera metamorphosed her into the bird called iynx (Eurasian wryneck, Jynx torquilla).

She was the symbol of restless, passionate love.

== Mythology ==
Iynx was the daughter of Pan and Echo, or Peitho. She was the creator of a magical love-charm known as the iynx—a spinning wheel with a wryneck bird attached. Iynx used her enchantments to make Zeus fall in love with her or with the nymph Io. Hera was enraged and transformed her into a wryneck bird.

According to another story, she was a daughter of Pierus, and as she and her sisters had presumed to enter into a musical contest with the Muses, she was changed into the bird iynx. This bird according to Pindar was the symbol of passionate and restless love, was given by Aphrodite to Jason, who, by turning it round and pronouncing certain magic words, excited the love of Medea.

== Magic wheel ==
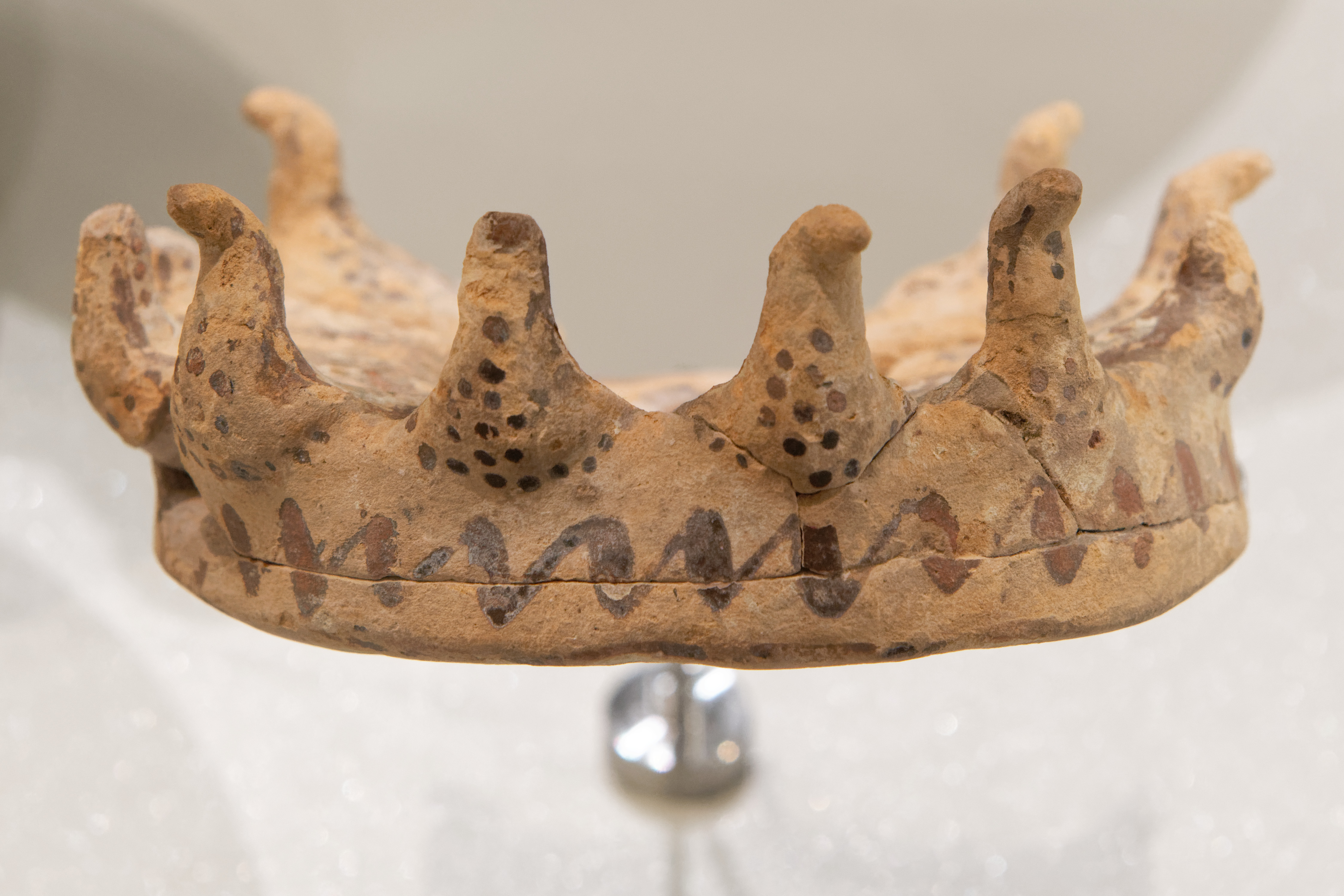
Iynx (bird wheel), a magic love charm. From Sterea Hellas Evoia, late 8th or early 7th century BC

Iynx toys were small metal or wooden discs rotated by pulling attached strings, in a manner similar to more modern button whirligig toys.

== See also ==
- Jinx
- Idyll II
- Love magic
- Magic in the Greco-Roman world
