= Homeric Hymns =

Ancient Greek poems composed between c. 800 BCE and c. 500 CE

- Attributed to Homer
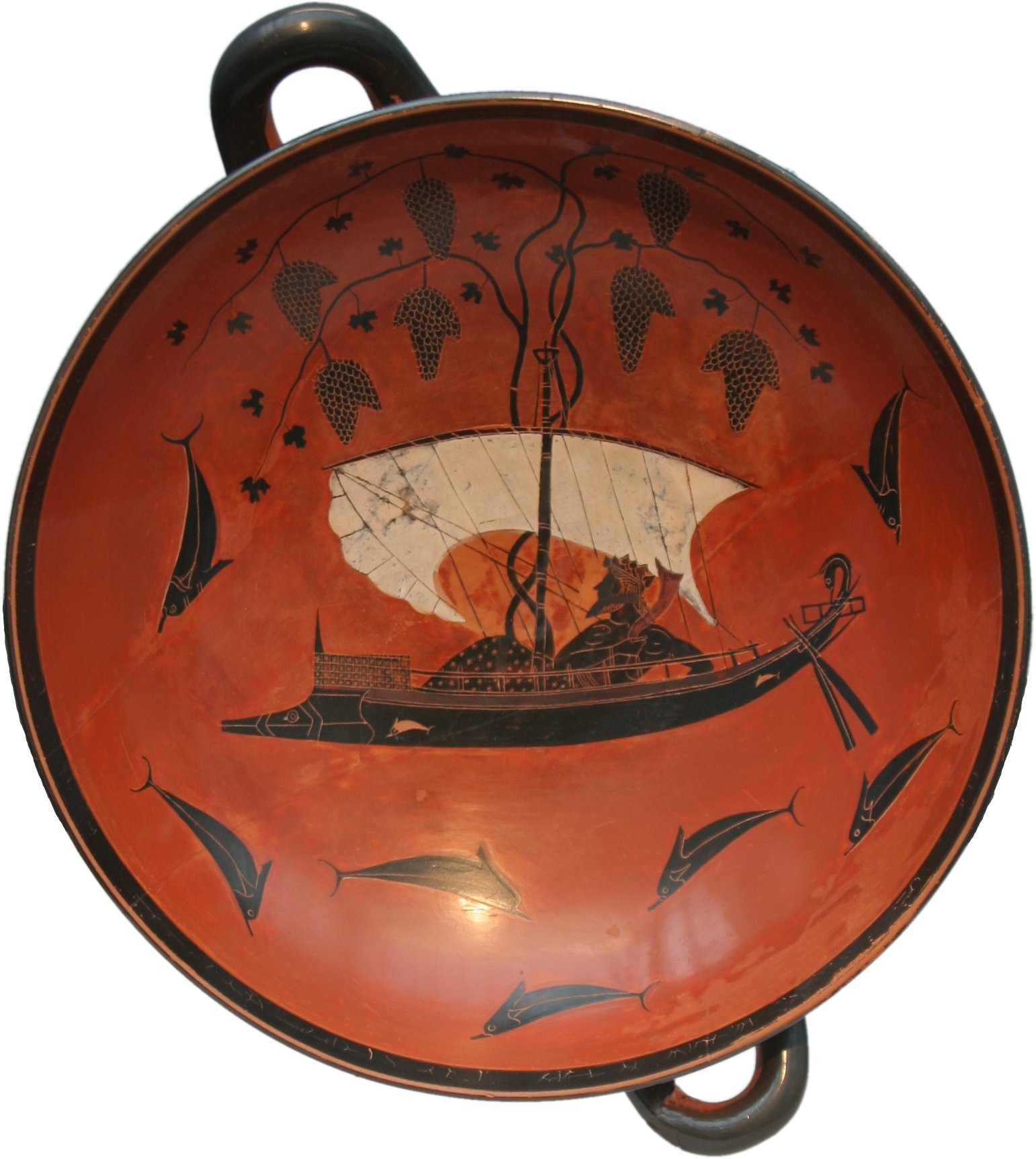
- The Dionysus Cup, a kylix painted by the Athenian Exekias around 530 BCE, possibly showing the narrative of the seventh Homeric Hymn
- Composed: c. 7th century BCE – c. 5th century CE
- Language: Ancient Greek
- Genres: Hymn (1–33); Epigram (34)
- Published in English: 1624, by George Chapman
- Metre: Dactylic hexameter

Full text
- Hesiod, the Homeric Hymns and Homerica at Wikisource

The Homeric Hymns (Ancient Greek: Ὁμηρικοὶ ὕμνοι, romanised: Homērikoì húmnoi) are a collection of thirty-three ancient Greek hymns and one epigram. (Note: The Hymn to Hosts is strictly an epigram, rather than a hymn, as it does not address a deity. It is transmitted in some manuscripts of the Homeric Hymns.) The hymns praise deities of the Greek pantheon and retell mythological stories, often involving a deity's birth, their acceptance among the gods on Mount Olympus, or the establishment of their cult. In antiquity, the hymns were generally, though not universally, attributed to the poet Homer: modern scholarship has established that most date to the seventh and sixth centuries BCE, though some are more recent and the latest, the Hymn to Ares, may have been composed as late as the fifth century CE.

The Homeric Hymns share compositional similarities with the Iliad and the Odyssey, also traditionally attributed to Homer. They share the same artificial literary dialect of Greek, are composed in dactylic hexameter, and make use of short, repeated phrases known as formulae. It is unclear how far writing, as opposed to oral composition, was involved in their creation. They may initially have served as preludes to the recitation of longer poems, and have been performed, at least originally, by singers accompanying themselves on a lyre or another stringed instrument. Performances of the hymns may have taken place at sympotic banquets, religious festivals and royal courts.

There are references to the Homeric Hymns in Greek poetry from around 600 BCE; they appear to have been used as educational texts by the early fifth century BCE, and to have been collected into a single corpus after the third century CE. Their influence on Greek literature and art was relatively small until the third century BCE, when they were used extensively by Alexandrian poets including Callimachus, Theocritus and Apollonius of Rhodes. They were also an influence on Roman poets, such as Lucretius, Catullus, Virgil, Horace and Ovid. In late antiquity (c. 200 – c. 600 CE), they influenced both pagan and Christian literature, and their collection as a corpus probably dates to this period. They were comparatively neglected during the succeeding Byzantine period (that is, until 1453), but continued to be copied in manuscripts of Homeric poetry; all the surviving manuscripts of the hymns date to the fifteenth century. They were also read and emulated widely in fifteenth-century Italy, and indirectly influenced Sandro Botticelli's painting The Birth of Venus.

The Homeric Hymns were first published in print by Demetrios Chalkokondyles in 1488–1489. (Note: Printing of the first edition commenced in 1488, but was not completed until January 1489.) George Chapman made the first English translation of them in 1624. Part of their text was incorporated, via a 1710 translation by William Congreve, into George Frideric Handel's 1744 musical drama Semele. The rediscovery of the Homeric Hymn to Demeter in 1777 led to a resurgence of European interest in the hymns. In the arts, Johann Wolfgang von Goethe used the Hymn to Demeter as an inspiration for his 1778 melodrama Proserpina. Their textual criticism progressed considerably over the nineteenth century, particularly in German scholarship, though the text continued to present substantial difficulties into the twentieth. The Homeric Hymns were also influential on the English Romantic poets of the early nineteenth century, particularly Leigh Hunt, Thomas Love Peacock and Percy Bysshe Shelley. Later poets to adapt the hymns included Alfred, Lord Tennyson, and Constantine P. Cavafy. Their influence has also been traced in the works of James Joyce, the film Rear Window by Alfred Hitchcock, and the novel Coraline by Neil Gaiman.

== Composition ==
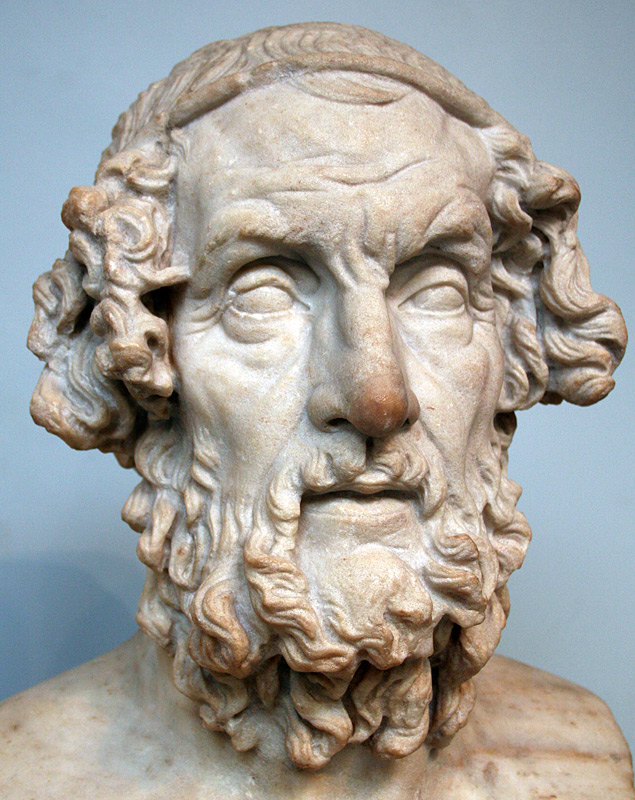
A Roman bust of Homer, considered in antiquity to be the poet of the Homeric Hymns, after a Hellenistic version of the second century BCE

The Homeric Hymns mostly date to the archaic period (c. 800 – c. 480 BCE) of Greek history, though they often retell much older stories. The earliest of the hymns date to the seventh century BCE; (Note: Pearcy 1989, p. iv. For a more detailed chronological hypothesis for the early hymns, see West 2012.) most were probably composed between that century and the sixth century BCE, though the Hymn to Ares was composed considerably later and may date from as late as the fifth century CE. Although the individual hymns can rarely be dated with certainty, the longer poems (Hymns 2–5) are generally considered archaic in date.

The earliest of the Homeric Hymns were composed in a time period when oral poetry was common in Greek culture. It is unclear how far the hymns were composed orally, as opposed to with the use of writing, and scholars debate the degree of consistency or "fixity" likely to have existed between early versions of the hymns in performance. (Note: In 1962, James Notopoulos established that the longer hymns share characteristic features of oral poetry, such as the use of repeated formulae and certain prosodic tendencies, with the Homeric epics. Notopoulos argued that this demonstrated that they were composed orally, a view echoed by Norman Postlethwaite for the shorter hymns in 1979. Other scholars, such as Geoffrey Kirk, rejected the legitimacy of Notopoulos's approach and argued for written composition. Richard Janko suggests that the earlier poems may initially have been composed orally, but dictated by rhapsodes for writing at a relatively early stage in their history.) The debate is clouded by the impossibility of determining for certain whether a poem with characteristic features of oral poetry was in fact composed orally, or composed using writing but in imitation of an oral-poetic style. Modern scholarship tends to avoid a sharp distinction between oral and written composition, seeing the poems as traditional texts originating in a strongly oral culture.

The name "Homeric Hymns" derives from the attribution, in antiquity, of the hymns to Homer, then believed to be the poet of the Iliad and Odyssey. The Hymn to Apollo was attributed to Homer by Pindar and Thucydides, who wrote around the beginning and the end of the fifth century BCE respectively. (Note: Bing 2009, p. 34; Thucydides 3.102; Pindar, Paean 7b. For Thucydides's dates, see Canfora 2006; for those of Pindar, see Eisenfeld 2022, pp. 18–19.) This attribution may have reflected the high esteem in which the hymns were held, as well as their stylistic similarities with the Homeric poems. The dialect of the hymns, an artificial literary language (Kunstsprache) derived largely from the Aeolic and Ionic dialects of Greek, is similar to that used in the Iliad and Odyssey. (Note: Pearcy 1989, p. v. On the Homeric Kunstsprache, see Bakker 2020.) Like the Iliad and Odyssey, the hymns are composed in the rhythmic form known as dactylic hexameter and make use of formulae: short, set phrases with particular metrical characteristics that could be repeated as a compositional aid.

The attribution to Homer was sometimes questioned in antiquity, such as by the rhetorician Athenaeus, who expressed his doubts about it around 200 CE. Other hypotheses in ancient times included the belief that the Hymn to Apollo was the work of Kynaithos of Chios, one of the Homeridae, a circle of poets claiming descent from Homer. Some ancient biographies of Homer denied his authorship of the Homeric Hymns, and the hymns' comparative absence, relative to the Iliad and Odyssey, from the work of scholars based in Hellenistic (323–30 BCE) Alexandria may suggest that they were no longer considered to be his work by this period. However, few direct statements denying Homer's authorship of the hymns survive from antiquity: in the second century CE, the Greek geographer Pausanias maintained their attribution to Homer.

Irene de Jong has contrasted the narrative focus of the Homeric Hymns with that of the Homeric epics, writing that the gods are the primary focus of the hymns, with mortals serving primarily to witness the gods' actions, whereas the epics focus primarily on their mortal characters and use the gods to support the portrayal of human affairs. (Note: de Jong 2018, p. 64, citing Kearns 2004, p. 7 and Parker 1991, p. 2.) The poems also make use of different narrative styles: the Homeric Hymns are unlike the Homeric epics in that they employ iterative narration (accounts of events which repeatedly or habitually occur), which is relatively rare in ancient Greek literature, within passages of singulative narration (accounts of specific events related in sequence). René Nünlist has also suggested that the Homeric Hymns generally place greater focus on single events than the Homeric epics, and cover a shorter span of time, resulting in what he calls a comparatively "slow" narration.

== Content and performance ==
Of Pallas Athena, guardian of the city, I begin to sing. Dread is she, and with Ares she loves deeds of war, the sack of cities and the shouting and the battle. It is she who saves the people as they go out to war and come back.

Hail, goddess, and give us good fortune with happiness!

— Hymn 11, "To Athena", translated by Hugh Evelyn-White

The hymns vary considerably in length, between 3 and 580 surviving lines. They are generally considered to have originally functioned as preludes (prooimia) to recitations of longer works, such as epic poems. (Note: Bing 2009, p. 34. For a contrary view, see Mathiesen 1999, p. 34.) Many of the hymns end with a verse indicating that another song will follow, sometimes specifically a work of heroic epic. Over time, however, at least some may have lengthened and been recited independently of other works. The hymns which currently survive as shorter works may equally be abridgements of longer works, retaining the introduction and conclusion of a poem whose central narrative has been lost.

The first known sources referring to the poems as "hymns" (hymnoi) date from the first century BCE. In concept, an ancient hymn was an invocation of a deity, often connected with a specific cult or sanctuary associated with that deity. The hymns often cover the deity's birth, arrival on Olympus, and dealings with human beings. Several discuss the origins of the god's cult or the founding of a major sanctuary dedicated to them. Some are aetiological accounts of religious cults, specific rituals, aspects of a deity's iconography and responsibilities, or of aspects of human technology and culture. The hymns have been considered as agalmata, or gifts offered to deities on behalf of a community or social group. In this capacity, Claude Calame has referred to them as "contracts", by which the praise of the deity in the hymn invites reciprocity from that deity in the form of favour or protection for the singer or their community.

Little is known about the musical settings of the Homeric Hymns. The earliest surviving ancient Greek musical compositions date to the end of the fifth century BCE, after the composition of nearly all of the hymns. Originally, the hymns appear to have been performed by singers accompanying themselves on a stringed instrument, such as a lyre; later, they may have been recited, rather than sung, by an orator holding a staff. The Hymn to Apollo makes reference to a chorus of maidens on the island of Delos, the Deliades, who sang hymns to Apollo, Leto and Artemis. References to instruments of the lyre family (known interchangeably as phorminx) occur throughout the Homeric Hymns and other archaic texts, such as the Iliad and Odyssey. These lyres generally had four strings in the early period of the hymns' composition, though seven-stringed versions became more common during the seventh century BCE. A paean, probably written in 138 BCE, mentions the accompaniment of hymnic singing with a kithara (a seven-stringed instrument of the lyre family), and contrasts this style of music with that of the aulos, a reeded wind instrument. It is unlikely that early Greek music was written down; instead, compositions were transmitted aurally and passed on through tradition. Until the fourth century BCE, few compositions appear to have been intended for repeat performance or long-term transmission.

The Homeric Hymns may have been composed to be recited at religious festivals, perhaps at singing contests: several directly or indirectly ask the god's support in competition. Some allude to the deity's cult at a specific place and may have been composed for performance within that cult, though the latter did not necessarily follow from the former. They seem likely to have been performed frequently in various contexts throughout antiquity, such as at banquets or symposia. It has been suggested that the fifth hymn, to Aphrodite, could have been composed for performance at a royal or aristocratic court, perhaps of a family in the Troad claiming descent from Aphrodite via her son Aeneas. The hymns' narrative voice has been described by Marco Fantuzzi and Richard Hunter as "communal", usually making only generalised reference to their place of composition or the identity of the speaker. This made the hymns suitable for recitation by different speakers and for different audiences. Jenny Strauss Clay has suggested that the Homeric Hymns played a role in the establishment of a panhellenic conception of the Olympian pantheon, with Zeus as its head, and therefore in promoting the cultural unity of Greeks from different polities. (Note: Johnston 2002, p. 110, citing the original 1989 publication of Strauss Clay 2006, passim.)

== Reception ==
=== Antiquity ===
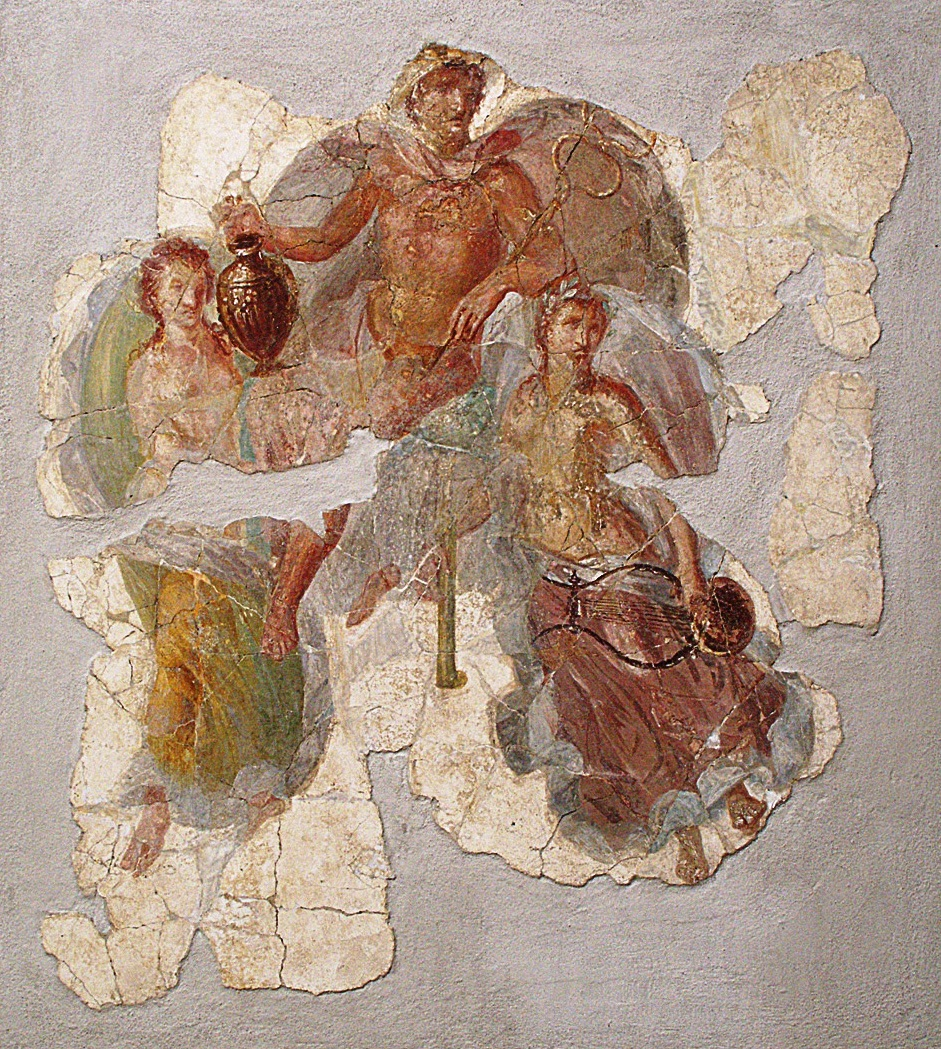
A fragmentary painting, showing Hermes, from Stabiae, first century CE

The Homeric Hymns are quoted comparatively rarely in ancient literature. There are sporadic references to them in early Greek lyric poetry, such as the works of Pindar and Sappho. (Note: Faulkner 2011a, pp. 200–201; on Sappho, see also Musso 1976.) The lyric poet Alcaeus composed hymns around 600 BCE to Dionysus and to the Dioscuri, which were influenced by the equivalent Homeric hymns, as possibly was Alcaeus's hymn to Hermes. The Homeric Hymn to Hermes also inspired the Ichneutae, a satyr play composed in the fifth century BCE by the Athenian playwright Sophocles. Few definite references to the hymns can be dated to the fourth century BCE, though the Thebaid of Antimachus may contain allusions to the hymns to Aphrodite, Dionysus and Hermes. A few fifth-century painted vases show myths depicted in the Homeric Hymns and may have been inspired by the poems, but it is difficult to be certain whether the correspondences reflect direct contact with the hymns or simply the commonplace nature of their underlying mythic narratives.

The hymns do not appear to have been studied by the Hellenistic scholiasts of Alexandria, though they were used and adapted by Alexandrian poets, particularly of the third century BCE. Eratosthenes, the chief librarian at Alexandria, adapted the Homeric Hymn to Hermes for his own Hermes, an account of the god's birth and invention of the lyre. Phainomena, a didactic poem about the heavens by Aratus, drew on the same poem. Callimachus drew on the Homeric Hymns for his own hymns, and is the earliest poet known to have used them as inspiration for multiple works. The hymns were also used by Theocritus, Callimachus's approximate contemporary, in his Idylls 17, 22 and 24, (Note: Fantuzzi & Hunter 2009, pp. 370–371; Faulkner 2011a, p. 195 (for Idyll 17).) (Note: Idyll 25, once attributed to Theocritus but now generally considered spurious, also alludes to the Homeric Hymn to Hermes.) and by the similarly contemporary Apollonius of Rhodes in his Argonautica. The mythographer Apollodorus, who wrote in the second century BCE, may have had access to a collection of the hymns and considered them Homeric in origin. The first century BCE historian Dionysius of Halicarnassus also quoted from the hymns and referred to them as "Homeric". Diodorus Siculus, another historian writing in the first century BCE, quoted verses of the first Hymn to Dionysus.

The Greek philosopher Philodemus, who moved to Italy between around 80 and 70 BCE and died around 40 to 35 BCE, has been suggested as a possible originator for the movement of manuscripts of the Homeric Hymns into the Roman world, and consequently for their reception into Latin literature. (Note: Keith 2016, pp. 125–126. On Philodemus, see Fish & Sanders 2011, p. 6.) His own works quoted from the hymns to Demeter and Apollo. In Roman poetry, the opening of Lucretius's De rerum natura, written around the mid 50s BCE, has correspondences with the Homeric Hymn to Aphrodite, (Note: Keith 2016, n. 30. For the dates of the De rerum natura, see Volk 2010, pp. 127, 131.) while Catullus emulated the Homeric Hymns in his epyllion on the wedding of Peleus and Thetis. Virgil drew upon the Homeric Hymns in his Aeneid, composed between 29 and 19 BCE. The encounter in Book 1 of the Aeneid between Aeneas and his mother Venus references the Homeric Hymn to Aphrodite, in which Venus's Greek counterpart seduces Aeneas's father, Anchises. Later in the Aeneid, the account of the theft of Hercules's cattle by the monster Cacus is based upon that of the theft of Apollo's cattle by Hermes in the Homeric Hymn to Hermes.

The Roman poet Ovid made extensive use of the Homeric Hymns: his account of Apollo and Daphne in the Metamorphoses, published in 8 CE, references the Hymn to Apollo, (Note: Keith 2016, pp. 109–110. For the date of the Metamorphoses, see Barchiesi 2024, p. 45.) while other parts of the Metamorphoses make reference to the Hymn to Demeter, the Hymn to Aphrodite and the second Hymn to Dionysus. Ovid's account of the abduction of Persephone in his Fasti, written and revised between 2 and around 14 CE, likewise references the Hymn to Demeter. (Note: Keith 2016, pp. 113–114. For the dates of the Fasti, see Toohey 2013, pp. 124–125.) Ovid further makes use of the Hymn to Aphrodite in Heroides 16, in which Paris adapts a section of the hymn to convince Helen of his worthiness for her. The Odes of Ovid's contemporary Horace also make use of the Homeric Hymns, particularly the five longer poems. In the second century CE, the Greek-speaking authors Lucian and Aelius Aristides drew on the hymns: Aristides used them in his orations, while Lucian parodied them in his satirical Dialogues of the Gods.

=== Late antiquity to Renaissance ===
The Birth of Venus by Sandro Botticelli: a fifteenth-century painting indirectly influenced by the second Homeric Hymn to Aphrodite

In late antiquity (that is, from around the third to the sixth centuries CE), (Note: Pearcy 1989, p. iv. For the dates of late antiquity, see Nees 2023, p. 20, with n. 14.) the direct influence of the Homeric Hymns was comparatively limited until the fifth century. The Hymn to Hermes was a partial exception, as it was frequently taught in schools. It is possibly alluded to in an anonymous third-century poem praising a gymnasiarch named Theon, preserved by a papyrus fragment found at Oxyrhynchus in Egypt and probably written by a student for a local festival. It also influenced the "Strasbourg Cosmogony", a poem composed around 350 CE (possibly by the poet and local politician Andronicus) in commemoration of the mythical origins of the Egyptian city of Hermopolis Magna. The Homeric Hymns did influence the fourth-century Christian poem The Vision of Dorotheus and a third-century hymn to Jesus transmitted among the Sibylline Oracles. They may also have been a model, alongside the hymns of Callimachus, for the fourth-century Christian hymns known as the Poemata Arcana, written by Gregory of Nazianzus. In the fifth century, the Greek-speaking poet Nonnus quoted and adapted the hymns; from that time onwards, other poets, such as Musaeus Grammaticus and Coluthus, made use of them.

Although the Homeric Hymns were known and transmitted in the Byzantine period, they were only rarely referenced, and never quoted, in Byzantine literature. The sixth-century poet Paul Silentiarius celebrated the restoration of Hagia Sophia by the emperor Justinian I in a poem which borrowed from the Homeric Hymn to Hermes. Later authors, such as the eleventh-century Michael Psellos, may have drawn upon them, but it is often unclear whether their allusions are drawn directly from the Homeric Hymns or from other works narrating the same myths. The hymns have also been cited as an inspiration for the twelfth-century poetry of Theodore Prodromos. The Homeric Hymns were copied and adapted widely in fifteenth-century Italy, for example by the poets Michael Marullus and Francesco Filelfo. Marsilio Ficino made a translation of them around 1462; Giovanni Tortelli used them for examples in his 1478 grammatical treatise De Orthographia. The Stanze per la giostra ('Stanzas for the Joust'), written in the 1470s by Angelo Poliziano, paraphrase the second Homeric Hymn to Aphrodite, and were in turn an inspiration for Sandro Botticelli's The Birth of Venus, painted in the 1480s.

=== Early modern period onwards ===
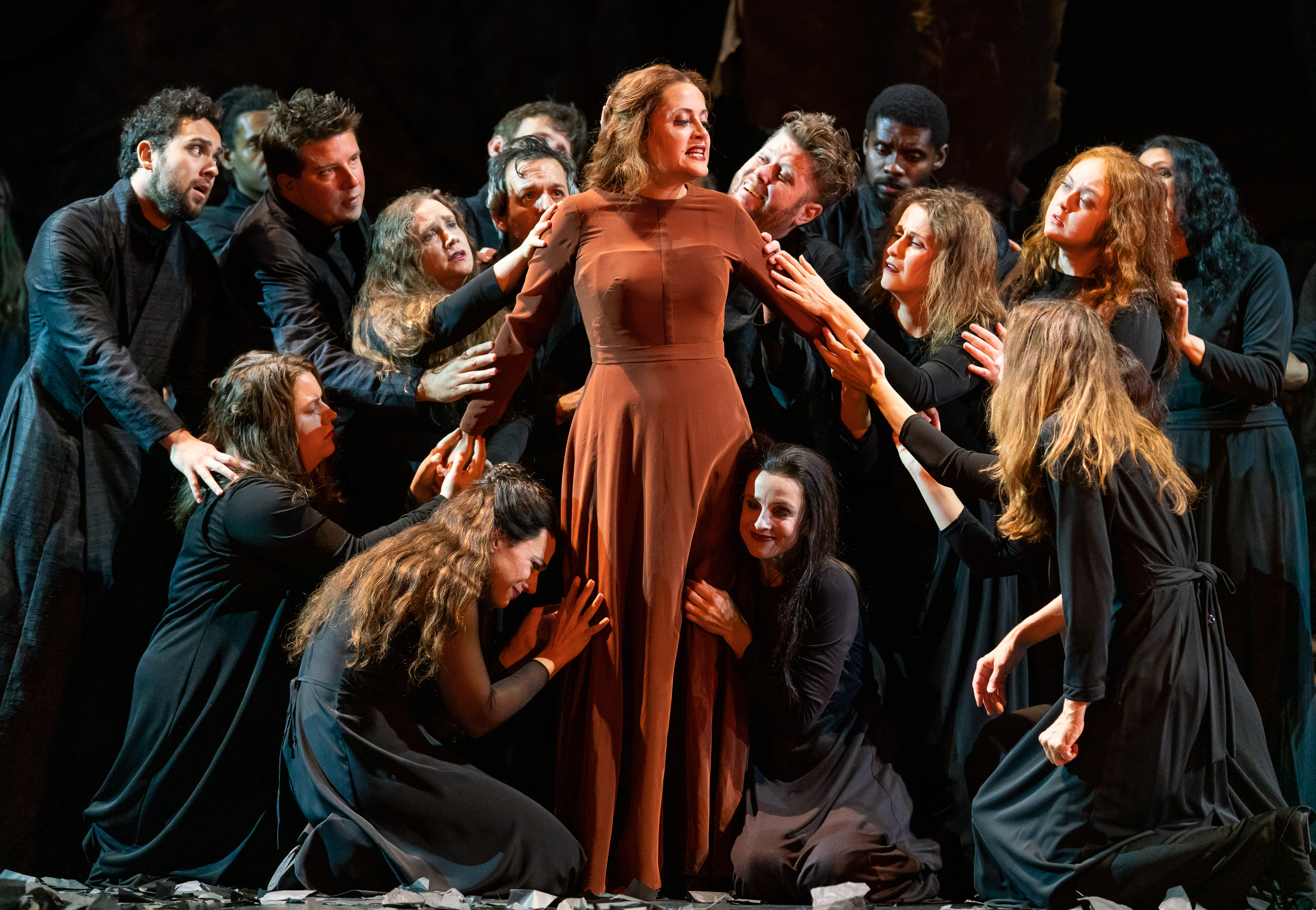
A scene from a 2019 performance of Handel's musical drama Semele, whose libretto includes translations from the Homeric Hymn to Aphrodite

Georgius Dartona made the first translation of the Homeric Hymns into Latin, which was published in Paris by Chrétien Wechel in 1538. (Note: The twentieth-century modernist poet Ezra Pound owned a copy of Dartona's translation, which was bound alongside one of the Odyssey made by Andreas Divus: Pound disparaged Dartona's work as "thin clear Tuscan stuff", as opposed to the "mellow phrase" of Divus.) Around 1570, the French humanist Jean Daurat gave lectures in which he advanced an allegorical reading of the opening of the first Hymn to Aphrodite. The first English translation of the hymns was made by George Chapman in 1624, as part of his complete translation of Homer's works. Although they received relatively little attention in English poetry in the seventeenth and eighteenth centuries, the playwright and poet William Congreve published a version of the first Hymn to Aphrodite, written in heroic couplets, in 1710. Congreve also wrote an operatic libretto, Semele, set to music by John Eccles in 1707 but not performed until the twentieth century. Congreve published the libretto in 1710; in 1744, George Frideric Handel released a version of the opera with his own music and alterations to the libretto made by an unknown collaborator, including a newly-added passage quoting Congreve's translation of the Hymn to Aphrodite. The rediscovery of the Hymn to Demeter in 1777 sparked a series of scholarly editions of the poem in Germany, and its first translations into German (in 1780) and Latin (in 1782). It was also an influence on Johann Wolfgang von Goethe's melodrama Proserpina, first published as a prose work in 1778.

The hymns were frequently read, praised and adapted by the English Romantic poets of the early nineteenth century. In 1814, the essayist and poet Leigh Hunt published a translation of the second Hymn to Dionysus. Thomas Love Peacock adapted part of the same hymn in the fifth canto of his Rhododaphne, published posthumously in 1818. (Note: Richardson 2016, p. 326. For Rhododaphne, see Barnett 2018, p. 4) In January 1818, Percy Bysshe Shelley made a translation of some of the shorter Homeric Hymns into heroic couplets; in July 1820, he translated the Hymn to Hermes into ottava rima. Of Shelley's own poems, The Witch of Atlas, written in 1820, and With a Guitar, to Jane, written in 1822, were most closely influenced by the Homeric Hymns, particularly the Hymn to Hermes. The 1889 poem "Demeter and Persephone" by Alfred, Lord Tennyson, reinterprets the narrative of the Hymn to Demeter as an allegory for the coming of Christ.

The Hymn to Demeter was particularly influential as one of the few sources, and the earliest source, for the religious rituals known as the Eleusinian Mysteries. It became an important nexus of the debate as to the nature of early Greek religion in early-nineteenth-century German scholarship. The anthropologist James George Frazer discussed the hymn at length in The Golden Bough, his influential 1890 work of comparative mythology and religion. James Joyce made use of the same hymn, and possibly Frazer's work, in his 1922 novel Ulysses, in which the character Stephen Dedalus references "an old hymn to Demeter" while undergoing a journey reminiscent of the Eleusinian Mysteries. Joyce also drew upon the Hymn to Hermes in the characterisation of both Dedalus and his companion Buck Mulligan. The Cantos by Joyce's friend and mentor Ezra Pound, written between 1915 and 1960, also draw on the Homeric Hymns: Canto I concludes with parts of the hymns to Aphrodite, in both Latin and English. In modern Greek poetry, the 1901 "Interruption" by Constantine P. Cavafy references the myth of Demophon as told in the Homeric Hymn to Demeter.

The first Homeric Hymn to Aphrodite has also been cited as an influence on Alfred Hitchcock's 1954 film Rear Window, particularly for the character of Lisa Freemont, played by Grace Kelly. Judith Fletcher has traced allusions to the Homeric Hymn to Demeter in Neil Gaiman's 2002 children's novel Coraline and its 2009 film adaptation, arguing that the allusions in the novel's text are "subliminal" but become explicit in the film.

== Textual history ==
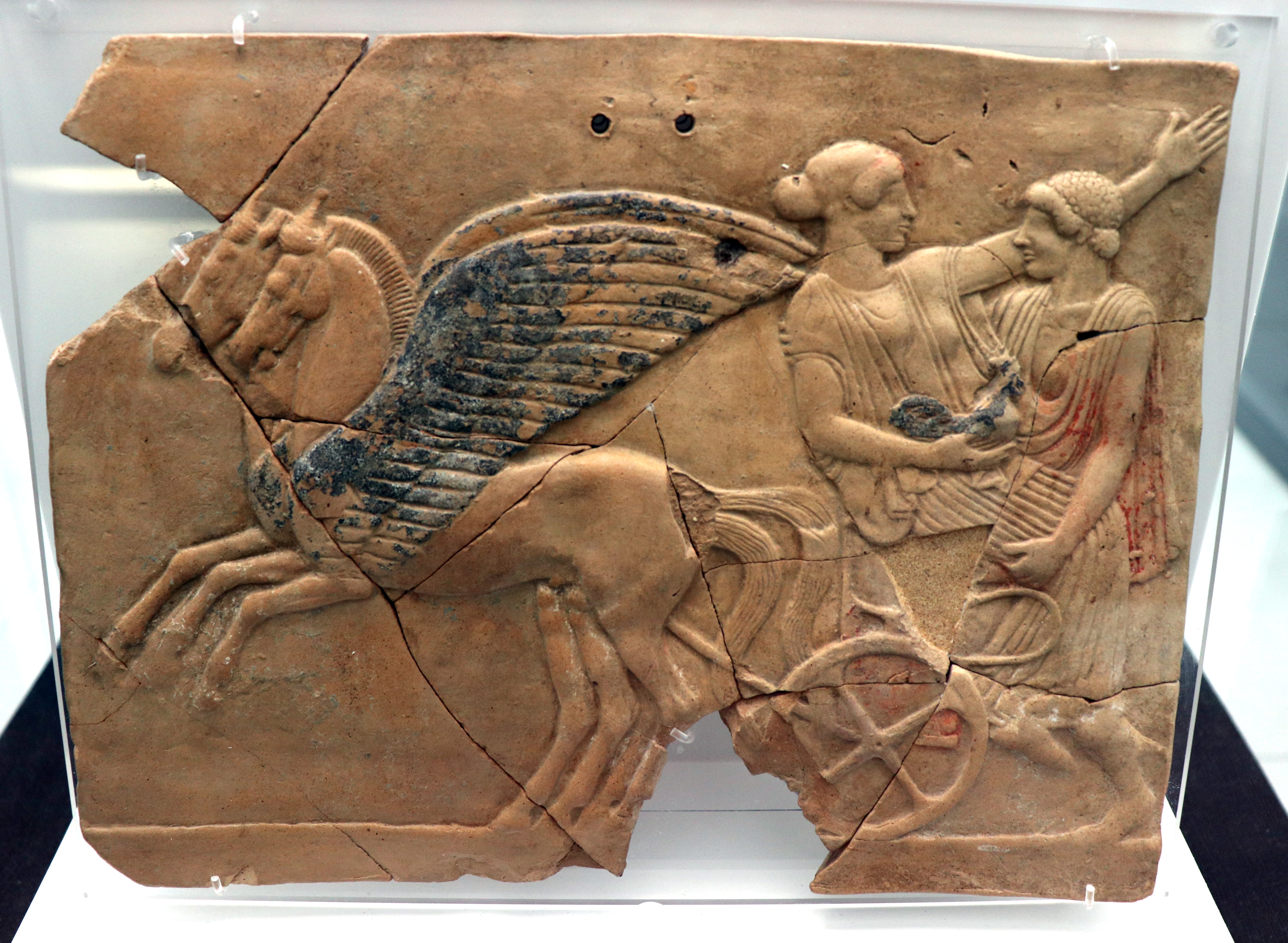
A terracotta pinax showing the Abduction of Persephone, from the sanctuary of Persephone at Epizephyrian Locris (Locri) in Calabria, Italy, used between the sixth and the fourth centuries BCE. Persephone's abduction forms the focus of the Hymn to Demeter, which may have been known at Locri.

=== Ancient and early modern transmission ===
Only a few ancient papyrus copies of the Homeric Hymns are known. An Attic vase painted around 470 BCE shows a youth, seated, holding a scroll with the first two words of the second Homeric Hymn to Hermes: this has been used to suggest that the hymns were used as educational texts by this period. (Note: Richardson 2010, p. 1. For the vase, see Beazley 1948.) At least the longer hymns seem to have been collected into a single edition at some point during the Hellenistic period (323–30 BCE). Alexander Hall has argued that Hymns 1–26, except 6 (the Hymn to Aphrodite) and 8 (the Hymn to Ares), were initially collected into what he calls a "proto-collection", probably no earlier than the Hellenistic period, with the remaining hymns later added as an appendix.

Unlike those of the Iliad and Odyssey, the text of the Homeric Hymns was comparatively little edited by the Hellenistic scholars of Alexandria. Franco Ferrari has suggested that, throughout antiquity, manuscripts of the text may have circulated which intentionally included two different versions ("doublets") of the same word: Alexandrian scholars developed the practice of marking these with a dotted antisigma (ↄ), evidence of which can be found in surviving manuscripts of the Hymn to Apollo.

The grouping of the hymns into their current corpus may date to late antiquity. References to the shorter poems as being within the corpus begin to be found in sources dating from the second and third centuries CE. The assemblage of the thirty-three hymns listed today as "Homeric" dates to no earlier than the third century CE. Between the fifth and the thirteenth centuries CE, the Homeric Hymns were generally transcribed in an edition which also contained the Hymns of Callimachus, the Orphic Hymns, the hymns of Proclus and the Orphic Argonautica.

Manuscripts of the Homeric Hymns, often bundling them with other works such as the hymns of Callimachus, continued to be made during the Byzantine period. The surviving medieval manuscripts of the poems date to the fifteenth century and are drawn primarily from the late-antique compilation of the Homeric Hymns along with Orphic and other hymnic poetry. They all descend from a single, now-lost manuscript, known in scholarship by the siglum Ω (omega) and possibly written in minuscule. (Note: Richardson 2010, p. 33. For the suggestion of Ω as a minuscule manuscript, see Allen 1895a, pp. 142–143 and Olson 2012, p. 43. For the textual and manuscript history of the hymns, see West 2003, p. 22) In fifteenth-century Italy, the hymns were copied widely. A manuscript known by the siglum V, commissioned by the Byzantine-born Catholic cardinal Bessarion probably in the 1460s, published the hymns at the end of a collection of the other works then considered Homeric. This arrangement became standard in subsequent editions of Homer's works, and played an important role in establishing the perceived relationship between the hymns, the Iliad and the Odyssey. The first printed edition (editio princeps) of the works of Homer, which included the Homeric Hymns, was made by the Florence-based Greek scholar Demetrios Chalkokondyles in 1488–1489. The 1566 edition, made by Henri Estienne, was the first to include line numbers and a Latin translation.

By the end of the eighteenth century, twenty-five Byzantine manuscripts were known. One, known as M or the Codex Mosquensis, was written by the polymath Ioannes Eugenikos in the first half of the fifteenth century, possibly in Constantinople or Italy. (Note: Richardson 2010, p. 33; Gelzer 1994, p. 124. Gelzer suggests that Μ was copied in Italy and should be dated after 1439; Simelidis argues for a date earlier in the 1430s and for production in Constantinople.) This manuscript preserved both the first Hymn to Dionysus and the Hymn to Demeter, but both were lost at some point after its creation and remained unknown until 1777, when the philologist Christian Frederick Matthaei discovered Μ in a barn outside Moscow. All surviving manuscripts, apart from Μ, have among their sources a lost one known by the siglum Ψ (psi), which probably dates to the twelfth or thirteenth century. This may be a manuscript mentioned in a letter by the humanist Giovanni Aurispa in 1424, which he stated he had acquired in Constantinople; Aurispa's manuscript has also been suggested as being Ω. (Note: Richardson 2003, p. xxiv, citing Pfeiffer 1976, p. 48.) As of 2016, a total of twenty-nine manuscripts of the hymns are known.

=== Modern scholarship ===
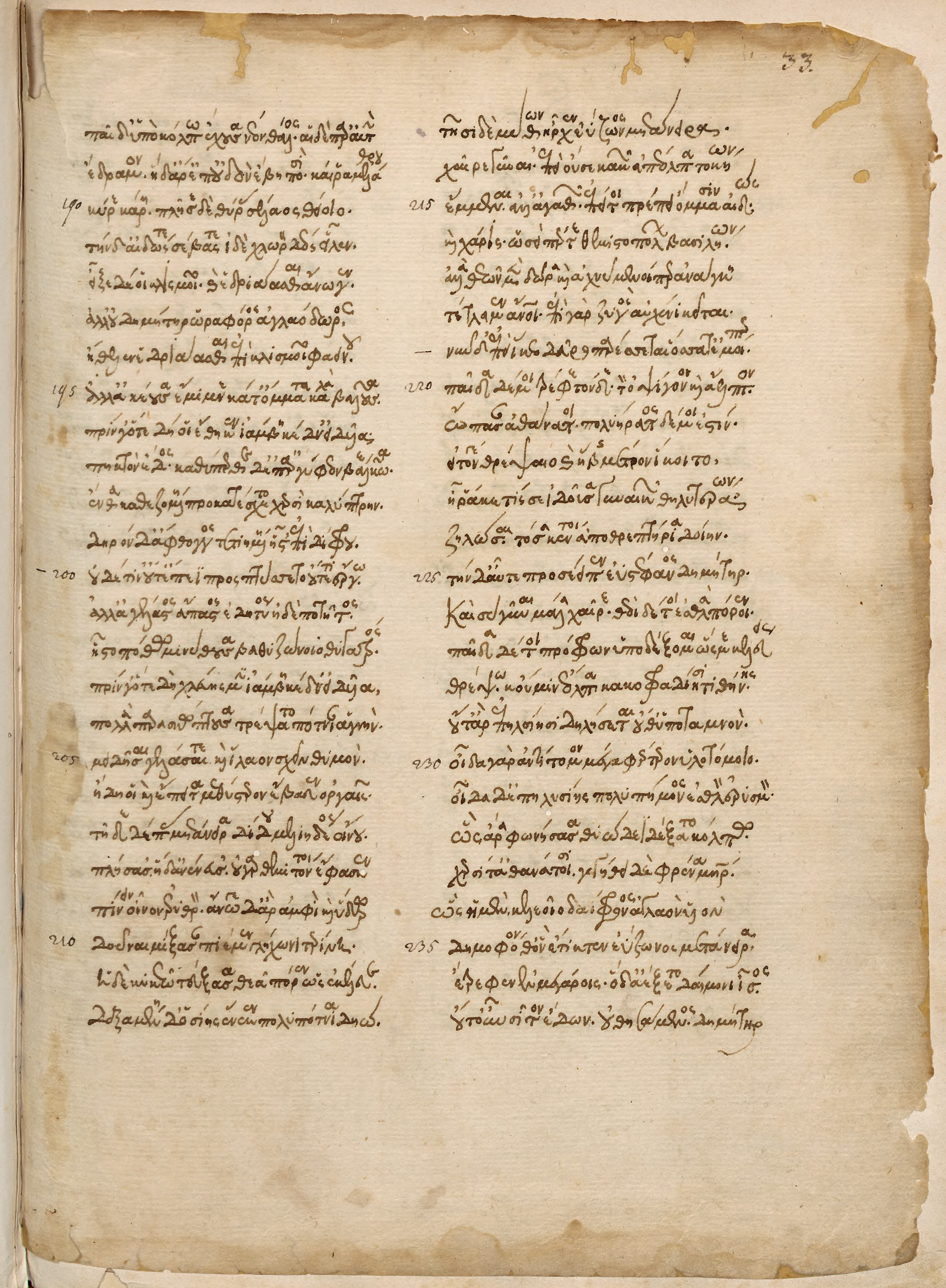
A page from the manuscript known as M, written in the fifteenth century and rediscovered in 1777. This page shows part of the Hymn to Demeter.

Until the later twentieth century, the Homeric Hymns received relatively little attention from classical scholars or translators. No collation of the hymns' manuscripts was made between that of Chalkokondyles in 1488 and 1749. Joshua Barnes published an edition of the hymns in 1711, which was the first to attempt to explain textual issues by citing parallels in other texts considered to be Homeric. Friedrich August Wolf published two editions, as part of larger editions of Homer, in 1794 and 1807. The first modern edition of the hymns as a separate text, without the Homeric epics, was made in 1796 by Karl David Ilgen and followed by editions by August Mattiae in 1805 and Gottfried Hermann in 1806. In 1886, Albert Gemoll published a German edition of the hymns: this was both the first modern edition in a vernacular language (that is, not in Latin) and the only edition to date that has printed digammas in their text. (Note: The letter digamma (ϝ), representing the sound /w/, ceased to be used in most Greek dialects during the Archaic period. It does not appear in manuscripts of the Homeric epics or the Homeric Hymns, but the prosody of the poems sometimes leaves traces of where it previously occurred in spoken Greek.) The present conventional order of the hymns was established by the Oxford edition of Alfred Goodwin in 1893, following that employed by the manuscript M: previously, the Hymn to Apollo had been placed first. (Note: Taida 2015, p. 199. Goodwin's edition is Goodwin 1893; it was finished by Thomas William Allen after Goodwin's death in 1892, though Allen omitted his own name from the publication.) Reviewing Goodwin's work in 1894, Edward Ernest Sikes judged that most of the important work on the Homeric Hymns had previously been done by German scholars, and that "little of importance" had recently been written, apart from Goodwin's edition, on them in English.

In the first half of the eighteenth century, Jacques Philippe d’Orville wrote a book of notes on the text of the Homeric Hymns, in which he condemned Barnes's then-standard 1711 edition and the 1722 edition of Michel Maittaire. The first modern textual criticism of the hymns dates to 1749, when David Ruhnken published his readings of two medieval manuscripts, known as A and C. The hymns' text was a matter of considerable scholarly attention in the nineteenth and early twentieth centuries. August Baumeister published an edition of the hymns in 1860, which was the first to integrate readings based on the Θ (theta) family of manuscripts (a sub-family of those descended from Ψ). (Note: Faulkner 2011b, p. 3. On the Θ manuscripts, see Olson 2012, p. 45.) Robert Yelverton Tyrrell wrote in 1894 that the text of the Homeric Hymns had been in a "state of chaos" before Baumeister's edition, though their text was still considered problematic at the turn of the 20th century: Thomas Leyden Agar wrote in 1916 of the "manifold and manifest" errors of tradition in the hymns. In 1984, Bruno Gentili suggested that variations found in the manuscript tradition as to the reading of particular passages may have been considered equally-correct alternations (adiaphoroi) available to a rhapsode, and therefore that attempts to discriminate between them in modern editions were misguided.

Between 1894 and 1897, Thomas William Allen published a series of four articles in The Journal of Hellenic Studies on textual problems in the Homeric Hymns, which became the basis of the 1904 edition of the hymns he co-produced with Edward Ernest Sikes. (Note: Faulkner 2011b, p. 3. The articles are Allen 1895a, Allen 1895b, Allen 1897b and Allen 1897c. The 1904 edition is Allen & Sikes 1904.) In 1912, Allen published an edition of the hymns in the Oxford Classical Texts series. (Note: Hosty 2021, p. 184. Allen's edition is Allen 1912.) He published an updated version of his 1904 edition in 1936, co-edited with William Reginald Halliday; Sikes refused to collaborate on it, but remained credited as an editor. (Note: Sinclair 1936, p. 217. On Sikes's refusal to collaborate on the updated edition, see Allen 1936, p. v. The edition is Allen, Halliday & Sikes 1936.) The first commentary on a single hymn was that of Nicholas Richardson on the Hymn to Demeter in 1974. (Note: Taida 2015, p. 200. Richardson's edition is Richardson 1974.) In his Loeb Classical Library edition of 2003, Martin West rejected the adiaphoroi argument of Gentili, choosing instead to posit a correct reading for each known alternation.

== List of the Homeric Hymns ==
List of the Homeric Hymns in their conventional order, with their dedicatees, the number of surviving lines, and a synopsis of their subject matter
No.	Title	Dedicated to	Date	Surviving lines	Subject matter	Ref.
1	"To Dionysus"	Dionysus	c. 650 – c. 600 BCE	21	The birth of Dionysus, and possibly also the binding of Hera and Dionysus's arrival on Olympus	
2	"To Demeter"	Demeter	c. late 7th – c. early 6th century BCE	495	The abduction of Persephone, Demeter's attempt to recover her from the Underworld, and the origin of the cult of Demeter at Eleusis	
3	"To Apollo" (Note: Sometimes divided into two: the "Hymn to Delian Apollo" (ending either at line 178 or 181) and the "Hymn to Pythian Apollo".)	Apollo	522 BCE	546	The foundation of Apollo's sanctuaries at Delphi and Delos: Leto's search for a place for Apollo to be born, and Apollo's search for a place for his oracle	
4	"To Hermes"	Hermes	c. second half of 6th century BCE.	580	The first three days of Hermes's life: his abduction of the cattle of Apollo and his crafting of a tortoiseshell lyre	
5	"To Aphrodite"	Aphrodite	Unknown: generally considered among the oldest, and earlier than the Hymn to Demeter. Possibly 1st half of 7th century BCE.	293	The love of Aphrodite for the mortal hero Anchises	
6	"To Aphrodite"	Aphrodite	c. 7th – c. 6th century BCE	21	Aphrodite's birth, travel to Cyprus, and acceptance at the court of the gods	
7	"To Dionysus"	Dionysus	Unclear: tentatively dated to c. 7th – c. 6th century BCE	59	Dionysus's capture by pirates and transfiguration of them into dolphins	
8	"To Ares" (Note: Claimed by Martin West as the work of the fifth-century CE philosopher Proclus: this attribution is now considered unsound on philosophical and philological grounds.)	Ares	c. 200 – c. 500 CE; also argued as possibly as early as the 3rd century BCE	17	A list of Ares's epithets and a prayer to him for courage, tranquillity and moderation	
9	"To Artemis"	Artemis	c. 7th – c. 6th century BCE	9	A short description of Artemis as a huntress, a dancer, and the sister of Apollo	
10	"To Aphrodite"	Aphrodite	c. 7th – c. 6th century BCE	6	Aphrodite's beauty, and a prayer to her for musical excellence	
11	"To Athena"	Athena	c. 7th – c. 6th century BCE	5	Athena's role as a goddess of war, and a prayer to her for good fortune and happiness	
12	"To Hera"	Hera	c. 7th – c. 6th century BCE	5	Hera's beauty and honour as the sister-wife of Zeus	
13	"To Demeter"	Demeter	c. 7th – c. 6th century BCE	3	Invocation of Demeter and Persephone, and a prayer to Demeter to protect the singer's city	
14	"To the Mother of the Gods"	Rhea or Cybele	Probably 7th century BCE	6	Salutation to the goddess and description of her love of sound and music	
15	"To Heracles the Lion-Hearted"	Heracles	Probably 6th century BCE	9	Brief biography of Heracles, including his deification and labours	
16	"To Asclepius"	Asclepius	c. 7th – c. 6th century BCE	5	Asclepius's birth and role as a healer	
17	"To the Dioscuri" (Note: An abridgement of Hymn 33.)	Castor and Pollux	c. 7th – c. 6th century BCE	5	The conception and birth of the Dioscuri	
18	"To Hermes" (Note: An abridgement of Hymn 4.)	Hermes	After c. 500 BCE, and later than the Hymn to Apollo, but before c. 470 BCE	12	The seduction of Maia, Hermes's mother, by Zeus	
19	"To Pan"	Pan	After 500 BCE, probably before 323 BCE, and probably slightly later than the Hymn to Hermes	49	Pan's wanderings through woods and mountains, his conception, birth and arrival on Olympus	
20	"To Hephaistos"	Hephaistos	c. 2nd half of 5th century BCE	8	Hephaistos's teaching of craft to human beings	
21	"To Apollo"	Apollo	c. 7th – c. 6th century BCE	5	Apollo as a subject of song for humans and animals	
22	"To Poseidon"	Poseidon	c. 7th – c. 6th century BCE	7	Poseidon's role as a god of the sea, earthquakes and horses	
23	"To Zeus"	Zeus	c. 7th – c. 6th century BCE	4	Zeus's power and wisdom	
24	"To Hestia"	Hestia	c. 7th – c. 6th century BCE	5	Invitation to Hestia to enter and bless the singer's house	
25	"To the Muses and Apollo" (Note: A cento, composed from lines taken from Hesiod's epic poem, Theogony.)	The Muses and Apollo	c. late 7th – c. 6th century BCE, probably 6th century	7	The Muses and Apollo as the patrons of singers and musicians	
26	"To Dionysus"	Dionysus	c. 7th – c. 6th century BCE	13	Dionysus and the nymphs: how the nymphs raised and now follow Dionysus	
27	"To Artemis"	Artemis	Probably before the 5th century BCE	22	Artemis's prowess as a huntress, and as a dancer at Delphi	
28	"To Athena"	Athena	Possibly 5th century BCE	18	The birth of Athena from the head of Zeus	
29	"To Hestia"	Hestia	c. 7th – c. 6th century BCE	13	The honours paid to Hestia in banquets, and an invitation to Hermes and Hestia to attend the singer	
30	"To Gaia, Mother of All"	Gaia	c. 500 – c. 300 BCE	19	The abundance and blessings of the Earth	
31	"To Helios"	Helios	c. 5th century BCE	19	Helios's birth, and chariot-borne journey across the sky	
32	"To Selene"	Selene	c. 5th century BCE	20	The radiance of Selene and her conception of Pandia with Zeus	
33	"To the Dioscuri"	Castor and Pollux	Possibly before 600 BCE	19	The role of the Dioscuri as protectors of mortals, especially seafarers	
34	"To Hosts"	All hosts	Unknown; before 200 CE	5	An entreaty to all hosts, reminding them of their sacred duty of hospitality (xenia)	

== Bibliography ==
- Agar, Thomas Leyden (1916). "The Homeric Hymns". The Classical Review. 30 (1): 4–6. doi:10.1017/S0009840X00009471. ISSN 0009-840X. JSTOR 699199.
- Agosti, Gianfranco (2016). "Praising the God(s): Homeric Hymns in Late Antiquity". In Faulkner, Andrew; Vergados, Athanassios; Schwab, Andreas (eds.). The Reception of the Homeric Hymns. Oxford: Oxford University Press. pp. 221–240. doi:10.1093/acprof:oso/9780198728788.003.0012. ISBN 9780198728788.
- Allen, Thomas William; Sikes, Edward Ernest, eds. (1904). The Homeric Hymns (1st ed.). London: Macmillan. OCLC 978029978 – via Internet Archive.
- Allen, Thomas William; Halliday, William Reginald; Sikes, Edward Ernest, eds. (1936). The Homeric Hymns (2nd ed.). Oxford: Oxford University Press. OCLC 5087450 – via Internet Archive.
- Allen, Thomas William (1895a). "The Text of the Homeric Hymns: I". The Journal of Hellenic Studies. 15: 136–183. doi:10.2307/624065. ISSN 0075-4269. JSTOR 624065.
- Allen, Thomas William (1895b). "The Text of the Homeric Hymns: II". The Journal of Hellenic Studies. 15: 251–313. doi:10.2307/624075. ISSN 0075-4269. JSTOR 624075.
- Allen, Thomas William (1897a). "Notes on the Homeric Hymns by J. P. D'Orville". The Journal of Philology. 25: 250–260. doi:10.1017/CBO9781139523783. ISSN 1751-8490.
- Allen, Thomas William (1897b). "The Text of the Homeric Hymns: III". The Journal of Hellenic Studies. 17: 45–62. doi:10.2307/623817. ISSN 0075-4269. JSTOR 623817.
- Allen, Thomas William (1897c). "The Text of the Homeric Hymns: IV". The Journal of Hellenic Studies. 17: 241–267. doi:10.2307/623829. ISSN 0075-4269. JSTOR 623829.
- Allen, Thomas William (1912). Homeri opera [Works of Homer] (in Latin). Vol. 5: Hymns, etc (Hymni, Cyclus, Fragmenta, Margites, Batr., Vitae). Oxford: Oxford University Press. OCLC 938405771 – via Internet Archive.
- Allen, Thomas William (1936). "Preface". In Allen, Thomas William; Halliday, William Reginald; Sikes, Edward Ernest (eds.). The Homeric Hymns (2nd ed.). Oxford: Oxford University Press. pp. v–vi. OCLC 5087450 – via Internet Archive.
- Athanassakis, Apostolos N. (2004). The Homeric Hymns (2nd ed.). Baltimore and London: Johns Hopkins University Press. ISBN 9780801879838.
- Bakker, Egbert J. (2020). "The Language of Homer". In Pache, Corinne Ondine (ed.). The Cambridge Guide to Homer. Cambridge: Cambridge University Press. pp. 70–79. doi:10.1017/9781139225649. ISBN 9781139225649.
- Barchiesi, Alessandro (2024). "Introduction". In Barchiesi, Alessandro; Rosati, Gianpiero (eds.). A Commentary on Ovid's Metamorphoses. Vol. 1. Cambridge: Cambridge University Press. pp. 1–48. doi:10.1017/9781139047272. ISBN 9780521895798.
- Barker, Elton; Christensen, Joel (2021). "Epic". In Ogden, Daniel (ed.). The Oxford Companion to Heracles. Oxford: Oxford University Press. pp. 283–300. doi:10.1093/oxfordhb/9780190650988.013.20. ISBN 9780190651015.
- Barnett, Suzanne L. (2018). Romantic Paganism: The Politics of Ecstasy in the Shelley Circle. Cham: Springer. ISBN 9783319547237.
- Beazley, John (1948). "Hymn to Hermes". American Journal of Archaeology. 53 (3): 336–340. doi:10.2307/500415. ISSN 0002-9114. JSTOR 500415.
- Bernabé, Alberto (7 June 2012). "Review: The Homeric Hymns: Interpretative Essays". Bryn Mawr Classical Review.
- Bing, Peter (2009). The Scroll and the Marble: Studies in Reading and Reception in Hellenistic Poetry. Ann Arbor: University of Michigan Press. ISBN 9780472116324.
- Bodley, Lorraine Byrne (2016). "From Mythology to Social Politics: Goethe's Proserpina". In Vlastos, George; Levidou, Katerina; Romanou, Katy (eds.). Musical Receptions of Greek Antiquity: From the Romantic Era to Modernism. Newcastle-upon-Tyne: Cambridge Scholars Publishing. pp. 35–67. ISBN 9781443896566.
- Bungard, Christopher (2011). "Lies, Lyres and Laughter: Surplus Potential in the Homeric Hymn to Hermes". Arethusa. 44 (2): 143–165. ISSN 0004-0975. JSTOR 44578359.
- Burkert, Walter (1979). "Kynaithos, Polycrates, and the Homeric Hymn to Apollo". In Bowersock, Glen W.; Burkert, Walter; Putnam, Michael C. J. (eds.). Arktouros: Hellenic Studies Presented to Bernard M. W. Knox on the Occasion of his 65th Birthday. Berlin: de Gruyter. pp. 53–62. ISBN 9783110077988.
- Calame, Claude (2011). "The Homeric Hymns as Poetic Offerings: Musical and Ritual Relationships with the Gods". In Faulkner, Andrew (ed.). The Homeric Hymns: Interpretative Essays. Oxford: Oxford University Press. pp. 334–358. doi:10.1093/acprof:oso/9780199589036.003.0014. ISBN 9780199589036.
- Canfora, Luciano (2006). "Biographical Obscurities and Problems of Composition". In Rengakos, Antonios; Tsakmakis, Antonis (eds.). Brill's Companion to Thucydides. Leiden: Brill. pp. 3–32. ISBN 9789047404842.
- Carpentier, Martha C. (2013) [1998]. Ritual, Myth and the Modernist Text: The Influence of Jane Ellen Harrison on Joyce, Eliot and Woolf. Abingdon: Routledge. ISBN 9781134389506.
- Càssola, Filippo (1975). Inni Omerici [Homeric Hymns] (in Italian). Milan: Fondazione Lorenzo Valla. ISBN 8804390182.
- Ciccolella, Federica (2020). "Maximos Margounios (c. 1549–1602), His Anacreontic Hymns, and the Byzantine Revival in Early Modern Germany". In Constantinidou, Natasha; Lamers, Han (eds.). Receptions of Hellenism in Early Modern Europe: 15th–17th Centuries. Leiden: Brill. pp. 215–232. ISBN 9789004343856.
- Clauss, James J. (2016). "The Hercules and Cacus Episode in Augustan Literature: Engaging the Homeric Hymn to Hermes in Light of Callimachus' and Apollonius' Reception". In Faulkner, Andrew; Vergados, Athanassios; Schwab, Andreas (eds.). The Reception of the Homeric Hymns. Oxford: Oxford University Press. pp. 55–78. doi:10.1093/acprof:oso/9780198728788.003.0003. ISBN 9780198728788.
- Daley, Brian (2006). Gregory of Nazianzus. Abingdon: Taylor and Francis. ISBN 9781134807277.
- de Jong, Irene (2012). "The Homeric Hymns". In de Jong, Irene (ed.). Space in Ancient Greek Literature. Mnemosyne Supplements. Vol. 339. Leiden: Brill. pp. 39–53. ISBN 9789004224384.
- de Jong, Irene (2018). "The Homeric Hymns". In De Temmerman, Koen; van Emde Boas, Evert (eds.). Characterization in Ancient Greek Literature: Studies in Ancient Greek Narrative. Vol. 4. Leiden: Brill. pp. 64–79. ISBN 9789004224384. JSTOR 10.1163/j.ctv29sfv4t.9.
- Depew, Mary (2009) [1970]. "Enacted and Represented Dedications: Genre and Greek Hymn". In Depew, Mary; Obbink, Dirk (eds.). Matrices of Genre: Authors, Canons, and Society. Cambridge, MA: Harvard University Press. pp. 59–80. ISBN 9780674034204.
- Dillon, Matthew (2003) [2002]. Girls and Women in Classical Greek Religion. Abingdon: Routledge. ISBN 9781134365098.
- Eisenfeld, Hanne (2022). Pindar and Greek Religion: Theologies of Mortality in the Victory Odes. Cambridge: Cambridge University Press. ISBN 9781108924351.
- Evelyn-White, Hugh (1914). Hesiod, the Homeric Hymns, and Homerica. Loeb Classical Library. London: William Heinemann. OCLC 5919541 – via Internet Archive.
- Fantuzzi, Marco; Hunter, Richard (2009) [2005]. Tradition and Innovation in Hellenistic Poetry. Cambridge: Cambridge University Press. doi:10.1017/CBO9780511482151. ISBN 9780511482151.
- Faulkner, Andrew (2005). "Review: Homeric Hymns and Hesiod". The Classical Review. New Series. 55 (2): 392–394. doi:10.1093/clrevj/bni218. ISSN 0009-840X. JSTOR 3873780.
- Faulkner, Andrew (2008). The Homeric Hymn to Aphrodite: Introduction, Text, and Commentary. Oxford: Oxford University Press. ISBN 9780191553424.
- Faulkner, Andrew (2010). "St. Gregory of Nazianzus and the Classical Tradition: The Poemata Arcana qua Hymns". Philologus. 154 (1): 78–87. doi:10.1524/phil.2010.0005. ISSN 0031-7985.
- Faulkner, Andrew (2011a). "The Collection of Homeric Hymns: From the Seventh to the Third Centuries BC". In Faulkner, Andrew (ed.). The Homeric Hymns: Interpretative Essays. Oxford: Oxford University Press. pp. 175–205. doi:10.1093/acprof:oso/9780199589036.003.0009. ISBN 9780199589036.
- Faulkner, Andrew (2011b). "Introduction: Modern Scholarship on the Homeric Hymns: Foundational Issues". In Faulkner, Andrew (ed.). The Homeric Hymns: Interpretative Essays. Oxford: Oxford University Press. pp. 1–28. doi:10.1093/acprof:oso/9780199589036.003.0001. ISBN 9780199589036.
- Faulkner, Andrew (2013). "The Performance of the Homeric Hymn to Aphrodite". In Bouchon, Richard; Brillet-Dubois, Pascale; Le Meur-Weissman, Nadine (eds.). Hymnes de la Grèce antique : approches littéraires et historiques. Actes du colloque international de Lyon, 19–21 juin 2008 [Hymns of Ancient Greece: Literary and Historical Approaches. Acts of the International Colloqium in Lyon, 19–21 June 2008]. Lyon: Maison de l'Orient et de la Méditerranée Jean Pouilloux. pp. 171–176. ISBN 9782356680310.
- Faulkner, Andrew (2016a). "Introduction". In Faulkner, Andrew; Vergados, Athanassios; Schwab, Andreas (eds.). The Reception of the Homeric Hymns. Oxford: Oxford University Press. pp. 1–26. doi:10.1093/acprof:oso/9780198728788.003.0001. ISBN 9780198728788.
- Faulkner, Andrew (2016b). "Theodoros Prodromos' Historical Poems: A Hymnic Celebration of John II Komnenos". In Faulkner, Andrew; Vergados, Athanassios; Schwab, Andreas (eds.). The Reception of the Homeric Hymns. Oxford: Oxford University Press. pp. 261–274. doi:10.1093/acprof:oso/9780198728788.003.0014. ISBN 9780198728788.
- Ferrari, Franco (2007). "Orality and Textual Criticism: The Homeric Hymns". In Cooper, Craig (ed.). Politics of Orality: Orality and Literacy in Ancient Greece. Mnemosyne Supplements. Vol. 280. Leiden: Brill. pp. 53–65. doi:10.1163/ej.9789004145405.i-380.18. ISBN 9789047408086.
- Finkelberg, Margalit, ed. (2011). The Homer Encyclopaedia. Vol. 1. Chicester: Wiley-Blackwell. ISBN 9781780348322.
- Fish, Jeffrey; Sanders, Kirk R. (2011). "Introduction". In Fish, Jeffrey; Sanders, Kirk R. (eds.). Epicurus and the Epicurean Tradition. Cambridge: Cambridge University Press. pp. 1–8. doi:10.1017/CBO9780511921704. ISBN 9780511921704.
- Fletcher, Judith (2019). Myths of the Underworld in Contemporary Culture: The Backward Gaze. Oxford: Oxford University Press. doi:10.1093/oso/9780198767091.001.0001. ISBN 9780191821288.
- Foley, Helene P., ed. (2013). The Homeric Hymn to Demeter: Translation, Commentary, and Interpretive Essays. Princeton: Princeton University Press. ISBN 9781400849086.
- Foley, John (1997). "Oral Tradition and Its Implications". In Morris, Ian; Powell, Barry B. (eds.). A New Companion to Homer. Leiden: Brill. pp. 146–173. ISBN 9004206086.
- Fraser, Jennifer (1999). "Intertextual Turnarounds: Joyce's Use of the Homeric 'Hymn to Hermes'". James Joyce Quarterly. 36 (3): 541–557. ISSN 0021-4183. JSTOR 25474056.
- Gelzer, Thomas (1994). "Zum Codex Mosquiensis und zur Sammlung der Homerischen Hymnen" [On the Codex Mosquiensis and the Collection of the Homeric Hymns] (PDF). Hyperboreus (in German). 1 (1): 113–137. ISSN 0949-2615.
- Gentili, Bruno (1984). Poesia e pubblico nella Grecia antica [Poetry and Public in Ancient Greece] (in Italian). Milan: Feltrinelli. ISBN 8807890070.
- Gladhill, C. W. (2012). "Sons, Mothers, and Sex: Aeneid 1.314–20 and the 'Hymn to Aphrodite' Reconsidered". Vergilius. 58: 159–168. ISSN 0276-9832. JSTOR 43186313.
- Goodwin, Alfred (1893). Hymni Homerici (in Latin). Completed, uncredited, by Thomas William Allen. Oxford: Oxford University Press. OCLC 4794146.
- Göransson, Kristian (2021). "Francavilla di Sicilia: A Greek Settlement in the Hinterland of Naxos". In Karivieri, Arja; Prescott, Christopher; Göransson, Kristian; Campbell, Peter; Tusa, Sebastiano (eds.). Trinacria, 'An Island Outside Time': International Archaeology in Sicily. Oxford: Oxbow Books. pp. 13–18. ISBN 9781789255942.
- Graziosi, Barbara (2002). Inventing Homer: The Early Reception of Epic. Cambridge: Cambridge University Press. ISBN 9780521809665.
- Harrison, Stephen (2016). "The Homeric Hymns and Horatian Lyric". In Faulkner, Andrew; Vergados, Athanassios; Schwab, Andreas (eds.). The Reception of the Homeric Hymns. Oxford: Oxford University Press. pp. 79–94. doi:10.1093/acprof:oso/9780198728788.003.0004. ISBN 9780198728788.
- Hall, Alexander E. W. (2021). "The Evolving Arrangement of the Homeric Hymns". In Kayachev, Boris (ed.). Poems Without Poets: Approaches to Anonymous Ancient Poetry. Cambridge Classical Journal Supplements. Vol. 43. Oxford: Oxbow Books. pp. 13–31. ISBN 9781913701413.
- Hatzichronoglou, Lena (2020). "Cavafy's 'Interruption': The Ancient Myth, the Modern Poem and Their Meaning for Us". In Davis, Gregson; Strauss Clay, Jenny; Burian, Peter (eds.). Euphrosyne: Studies in Ancient Philosophy, History, and Literature. Berlin: De Gruyter. pp. 253–269. ISBN 9783110605938.
- Haynes, Kenneth (2007). "Modernism". In Kallendorf, Craig W. (ed.). A Companion to the Classical Tradition. Oxford: Blackwell. pp. 101–114. doi:10.1002/9780470996775. ISBN 9781405122948.
- Henderson, Isobel (1969) [1957]. "Ancient Greek Music". In Wellesz, Egon (ed.). Ancient and Oriental Music. New Oxford History of Music. Vol. 1. London: Oxford University Press. pp. 336–403. OCLC 271828.
- Hosty, Matthew (2021). "'Have You Ever Known What It Is Like to Be an Orphan?' The Batrachomyomachia and Its Absent Author". In Kayachev, Boris (ed.). Poems Without Poets: Approaches to Anonymous Ancient Poetry. Cambridge Classical Journal Supplements. Vol. 43. Oxford: Oxbow Books. pp. 173–186. ISBN 9781913701413.
- Jaillard, Dominique (2011). "The Seventh Homeric Hymn to Dionysus: An Epiphanic Sketch". In Faulkner, Andrew (ed.). The Homeric Hymns: Interpretative Essays. Oxford: Oxford University Press. pp. 113–150. doi:10.1093/acprof:oso/9780199589036.003.0007. ISBN 9780199589036.
- Janko, Richard (2007) [1982]. Homer, Hesiod and the Hymns: Diachronic Development in Epic Diction. Cambridge: Cambridge University Press. ISBN 9780521035651.
- Johnston, Sarah Iles (2002). "Myth, Festival, and Poet: The 'Homeric Hymn to Hermes' and Its Performative Context". Classical Philology. 97 (2): 109–132. doi:10.1086/449575. ISSN 0009-837X. JSTOR 1215457.
- Kearns, Emily (2004). "The Gods in the Homeric Epics". In Fowler, Robert (ed.). The Cambridge Companion to Homer. Cambridge: Cambridge University Press. pp. 59–73. doi:10.1017/CCOL0521813026. ISBN 9780511998935.
- Keith, Alison (2016). "The Homeric Hymn to Aphrodite in Ovid and Augustan Literature". In Faulkner, Andrew; Vergados, Athanassios; Schwab, Andreas (eds.). The Reception of the Homeric Hymns. Oxford: Oxford University Press. pp. 109–126. doi:10.1093/acprof:oso/9780198728788.003.0006. ISBN 9780198728788.
- Kilmer, Anne Draffkorn (2014). "A Brief Account of the Development of the Field of Music Archaeology". In Westenholz, Joan Goodnick; Maurey, Yossi; Seroussi, Edwin (eds.). Music in Antiquity: The Near East and the Mediterranean. Berlin: De Gruyter. pp. 11–15. doi:10.1515/9783110340297. ISBN 9783110340297.
- Kirk, Geoffrey (1966). "Formular Language and Oral Quality". Yale Classical Studies: 153–157. ISSN 0084-330X.
- Liebregts, Peter (2004). Ezra Pound and Neoplatonism. Vancouver: Fairleigh Dickinson University Press. ISBN 9780838640111.
- Lincoln, Stoddard (1984). "The Lyrics and Librettos of William Congreve". In Kenny, Shirley Strum (ed.). British Theatre and the Other Arts, 1600–1800. Washington, D.C.: Folger Books. pp. 116–132. ISBN 978-0-918016-65-2. OCLC 9412947 – via Internet Archive.
- Mathiesen, Thomas J. (1999). Apollo's Lyre: Greek Music and Music Theory in Antiquity and the Middle Ages. Lincoln: University of Nebraska Press. ISBN 9780803230798 – via Internet Archive.
- Musso, Olimpio (1976). "Un verso dell'inno omerico a Demetra e un frammento di Saffo" [A Verse of the Homeric Hymn to Demeter and a Fragment of Sappho]. Zeitschrift für Papyrologie und Epigraphik [Journal of Papyrology and Epigraphy] (in Italian). 22: 37–39. ISSN 0084-5388. JSTOR 20181152.
- Nagy, Gregory (2011). "The Earliest Phases in the Reception of the Homeric Hymns". In Faulkner, Andrew (ed.). The Homeric Hymns: Interpretative Essays. Oxford: Oxford University Press. pp. 280–333. ISBN 9780199589036.
- Nagy, Gregory (12 December 2018). "Homeric Hymn to Aphrodite". The Center for Hellenic Studies.
- Nees, Lawrence (2023). Illuminating the Word in the Early Middle Ages. Cambridge: Cambridge University Press. doi:10.1017/9781009193870. ISBN 9781009193870.
- Notopoulos, James A. (1962). "The Homeric Hymns as Oral Poetry; A Study of the Post-Homeric Oral Tradition". The American Journal of Philology. 83 (4): 337–368. doi:10.2307/292918. ISSN 0002-9475. JSTOR 292918.
- Nünlist, René (2007). "Homeric Hymns". In de Jong, Irene; Nünlist, René (eds.). Time in Ancient Greek Literature: Studies in Ancient Greek Narrative. Vol. 2. Leiden: Brill. pp. 53–62. ISBN 9789004165069. JSTOR 10.1163/j.ctv29sftrn.8.
- Ogden, Daniel (2021). "Introduction". In Ogden, Daniel (ed.). The Oxford Handbook of Heracles. Oxford: Oxford University Press. pp. xxi–xxxii. ISBN 9780190650988.
- Olson, S. Douglas (2011). "Immortal Encounters: Aeneid 1 and the Homeric Hymn to Aphrodite". Vergilius. 57: 55–61. ISSN 0276-9832. JSTOR 41587395.
- Olson, S. Douglas (2012). The "Homeric Hymn to Aphrodite" and Related Texts: Text, Translation and Commentary. Berlin: De Gruyter. doi:10.1515/9783110260748. ISBN 9783110260748.
- Padilla, Mark William (2018). Classical Myth in Alfred Hitchcock's Wrong Man and Grace Kelly Films. Lanham: Lexington Books. ISBN 9781498563512.
- Parker, Robert (1991). "The Hymn to Demeter and the Homeric Hymns". Greece & Rome. 38 (1): 1–17. doi:10.1017/S0017383500022932. ISSN 0017-3835. JSTOR 643104.
- Pearcy, Lee T. (1989). The Shorter Homeric Hymns. Bryn Mawr Greek Commentaries. Bryn Mawr: Bryn Mawr Commentaries. ISBN 0929524624.
- Peels, Saskia (2015). Hosios: A Semantic Study of Greek Piety. Leiden: Brill. ISBN 9789004304277.
- Peirano, Irene (2012). The Rhetoric of the Roman Fake: Latin Pseudepigrapha in Context. Cambridge: Cambridge University Press. doi:10.1017/CBO9780511732331. ISBN 9780511732331.
- Petrovic, Ivana (2012). "Rhapsodic Hymns and Epyllia". In Baumbach, Manuel; Bär, Silvio (eds.). Brill's Companion to Greek and Latin Epyllion and Its Reception. Leiden: Brill. pp. 149–176. doi:10.1163/9789004233058_008. ISBN 9789004233058.
- Pfeiffer, Rudolf (1976) [1968]. A History of Classical Scholarship. Vol. 1: 1300–1850. Oxford: Oxford University Press. ISBN 0198143427.
- Piper, David (1982). The Image of the Poet: British Poets and Their Portraits. Oxford: Oxford University Press. ISBN 0198173652 – via Internet Archive.
- Postlethwaite, Norman (1979). "Formula and Formulaic: Some Evidence from the Homeric Hymns". Phoenix. 33 (1): 1–18. doi:10.2307/1087847. ISSN 0031-8299. JSTOR 1087847.
- Powell, Barry B. (2022). Greek Poems to the Gods: Hymns from Homer to Proclus. Berkeley: University of California Press. ISBN 9780520391697.
- Price, Simon R. F. (1999). Religions of the Ancient Greeks. Cambridge: Cambridge University Press. ISBN 9780521388672.
- Rayor, Diane J. (2014) [2004]. The Homeric Hymns: A Translation, with Introduction and Notes (Updated ed.). Berkeley: University of California Press. ISBN 9780520282117 – via Internet Archive.
- Rice, Paul F. (2020). The Solo English Cantatas and Italian Odes of Thomas A. Arne. Newcastle-upon-Tyne: Cambridge Scholars Publishing. ISBN 9781527545052.
- Richardson, Nicholas, ed. (1974). The Homeric Hymn to Demeter. Oxford: Oxford University Press. ISBN 0198141998 – via Internet Archive.
- Richardson, Nicholas (2003). The Homeric Hymns. Penguin Classics. Translated by Cashford, Jules. London: Penguin. pp. vii–xxxv. ISBN 9780140437829.
- Richardson, Nicholas (2010). Three Homeric Hymns to Apollo, Hermes, and Aphrodite. Cambridge Greek and Latin Classics. Cambridge: Cambridge University Press. doi:10.1017/CBO9780511840296. ISBN 9780521451581.
- Richardson, Nicholas (2016). "'Those Miraculous Effusions of Genius': The Homeric Hymns Seen Through the Eyes of English Poets". In Faulkner, Andrew; Vergados, Athanassios; Schwab, Andreas (eds.). The Reception of the Homeric Hymns. Oxford: Oxford University Press. pp. 325–344. doi:10.1093/acprof:oso/9780198728788.003.0017. ISBN 9780198728788.
- Sarton, George (2012) [1952]. Ancient Science Through the Golden Age of Greece. New York: Dover Publications. ISBN 9780486144986.
- Schwab, Andreas (2016). "The Reception of the Homeric Hymn to Demeter in Romantic Heidelberg: J. H. Voss and 'the Eleusinian Document'". In Faulkner, Andrew; Vergados, Athanassios; Schwab, Andreas (eds.). The Reception of the Homeric Hymns. Oxford: Oxford University Press. pp. 345–366. doi:10.1093/acprof:oso/9780198728788.003.0018. ISBN 9780198728788.
- Schwab, M. Elisabeth (2016). "The Rebirth of Venus: The Homeric Hymns to Aphrodite and Poliziano's Stanze". In Faulkner, Andrew; Vergados, Athanassios; Schwab, Andreas (eds.). The Reception of the Homeric Hymns. Oxford: Oxford University Press. pp. 301–324. doi:10.1093/acprof:oso/9780198728788.003.0016. ISBN 9780198728788.
- Shapiro, H. Alan (2002). "Demeter and Persephone in Western Greece: Migrations of Myth and Cult". In Bennett, Michael; Paul, Aaron J.; Iozzo, Mario (eds.). Magna Graecia: Greek Art from South Italy and Sicily. Cleveland: The Cleveland Museum of Art. pp. 82–97. ISBN 9780940717718.
- Sikes, Edward Ernest (1894). "Goodwin's Homeric Hymns". The Classical Review. 8 (4): 156–157. doi:10.1017/S0009840X0018792X. ISSN 0009-840X. JSTOR 691278.
- Simelidis, Christos (2016). "On the Homeric Hymns in Byzantium". In Faulkner, Andrew; Vergados, Athanassios; Schwab, Andreas (eds.). The Reception of the Homeric Hymns. Oxford: Oxford University Press. pp. 243–260. doi:10.1093/acprof:oso/9780198728788.003.0013. ISBN 9780198728788.
- Sinclair, Thomas Alan (1936). "The Homeric Hymns by T. W. Allen, W. R. Halliday, E. E. Sikes". The Classical Review. 50 (6): 217–218. doi:10.1017/S0009840X00077891. ISSN 0009-840X. JSTOR 705484.
- Small, Stuart G. P. (1983). Catullus: A Reader's Guide to the Poems. Lanham: University Press of America. ISBN 0819129062.
- Sowa, Cora Angier (1984). Traditional Themes and the Homeric Hymns. Wauconda: Bolchazy-Carducci. ISBN 0865160376.
- Stange, G. Robert (1954). "Tennyson's Mythology: A Study of Demeter and Persephone". ELH. 21 (1): 67–80. doi:10.2307/2871934. ISSN 0013-8304. JSTOR 2871934.
- Strauss Clay, Jenny (2006) [1989]. The Politics of Olympus: Form and Meaning in the Major Homeric Hymns (2nd ed.). Princeton: Princeton University Press. ISBN 1853996920.
- Strauss Clay, Jenny (2016). "Visualizing Divinity: The Reception of the Homeric Hymns in Greek Vase Painting". In Faulkner, Andrew; Vergados, Athanassios; Schwab, Andreas (eds.). The Reception of the Homeric Hymns. Oxford: Oxford University Press. pp. 29–52. doi:10.1093/acprof:oso/9780198728788.003.0002. ISBN 9780198728788.
- Strolonga, Polyxeni (2016). "The Homeric Hymns Turn into Dialogues: Lucian's Dialogues of the Gods". In Faulkner, Andrew; Vergados, Athanassios; Schwab, Andreas (eds.). The Reception of the Homeric Hymns. Oxford: Oxford University Press. pp. 145–164. doi:10.1093/acprof:oso/9780198728788.003.0008. ISBN 9780198728788.
- Taida, Ichiro (2015). "A Chronological Study of the Editions of the Homeric Hymns" (PDF). Žmogus kalbos erdvėje [Man in the Space of Language]. 8: 194–203. ISSN 2424-385X.
- Thomas, Oliver (2011). "The Homeric Hymn to Pan". In Faulkner, Andrew (ed.). The Homeric Hymns: Interpretative Essays. Oxford: Oxford University Press. pp. 151–173. doi:10.1093/acprof:oso/9780199589036.003.0008. ISBN 9780199589036.
- Thomas, Oliver (2016). "Homeric and/or Hymns: Some Fifteenth-Century Approaches". In Faulkner, Andrew; Vergados, Athanassios; Schwab, Andreas (eds.). The Reception of the Homeric Hymns. Oxford: Oxford University Press. pp. 277–300. doi:10.1093/acprof:oso/9780198728788.003.0015. ISBN 9780198728788.
- Toohey, Peter (2013) [1996]. Epic Lessons: An Introduction to Ancient Didactic Poetry. Abingdon: Routledge. ISBN 9781135035341.
- Tsagalis, Christos (2022). Early Greek Epic: Language, Interpretation, Performance. Berlin: De Gruyter. doi:10.1515/9783110981384. ISBN 9783110981384.
- Tyrrell, Robert Yelverton (1894). "The Homeric Hymns". Hermathena. 9 (20): 30–49. ISSN 0018-0750. JSTOR 23036515.
- van den Berg, Rudolphus Maria (2001). Proclus' Hymns: Essays, Translations, Commentary. Philosophia Antiqua. Vol. 90. Leiden: Brill. ISBN 9004122362.
- Vergados, Athanassios (2012). The "Homeric Hymn to Hermes": Introduction, Text and Commentary. Berlin: De Gruyter. ISBN 9783110259704.
- Vergados, Athanassios (2016). "The Reception of the Homeric Hymns in Aelius Aristides". In Faulkner, Andrew; Vergados, Athanassios; Schwab, Andreas (eds.). The Reception of the Homeric Hymns. Oxford: Oxford University Press. pp. 165–186. doi:10.1093/acprof:oso/9780198728788.003.0009. ISBN 9780198728788.
- Volk, Katharina (2010). "Lucretius's Prayer for Peace and the Date of De Rerum Natura". The Classical Quarterly. 60 (1): 127–131. doi:10.1017/S0009838809990486. ISSN 0009-8388. JSTOR 40984743.
- West, Martin (1970). "The Eighth Homeric Hymn and Proclus". The Classical Quarterly. 20 (2): 300–304. doi:10.1017/S0009838800036260. ISSN 0009-8388. JSTOR 637428.
- West, Martin (1981). "The Singing of Homer and the Modes of Early Greek Music". The Journal of Hellenic Studies. 101: 113–129. doi:10.2307/629848. ISSN 0075-4269. JSTOR 629848.
- West, Martin (1992). Ancient Greek Music. Oxford: Oxford University Press. ISBN 0198148976 – via Internet Archive.
- West, Martin, ed. (2003). Homeric Hymns. Homeric Apocrypha. Lives of Homer. Loeb Classical Library. Vol. 496. Cambridge, MA: Harvard University Press. ISBN 0674996062.
- West, Martin (2011). "The First Homeric Hymn to Dionysus". In Faulkner, Andrew (ed.). The Homeric Hymns: Interpretative Essays. Oxford: Oxford University Press. pp. 29–43. doi:10.1093/acprof:oso/9780199589036.003.0002. ISBN 9780199589036.
- West, Martin (2012) [2011]. "Towards a Chronology of Early Greek Epic". In Andersen, Øivind (ed.). Relative Chronology in Early Greek Epic Poetry. Cambridge: Cambridge University Press. pp. 224–241. doi:10.1017/CBO9780511921728. ISBN 9780511921728.
