= Idyll XXIV =

Poem by Theocritus

Idyll XXIV, also called Ἡρακλίσκος (Heracliscus; 'The Little Heracles'), is a poem by the 3rd-century BC Greek poet Theocritus. This poem describes the earliest feat of Heracles, the slaying of the snakes sent against him by Hera, and gives an account of the hero's training.

== Summary ==
The poem tells first how the infant Heracles killed the two snakes sent by the outraged Hera to devour him, and next of the rites which the seer Teiresias advised his mother Alcmena to perform in order to avert her wrath. We are then told of the education of Heracles, and the poem breaks off abruptly in the manuscripts. After there is an account of his diet and clothing.

== Analysis ==
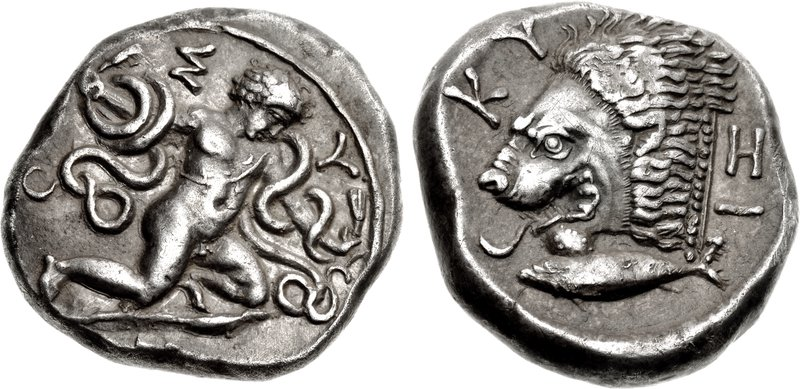
Silver tridrachm of Cyzicus, 4th cent. BC. Infant Heracles strangling snakes; lion head and tunny

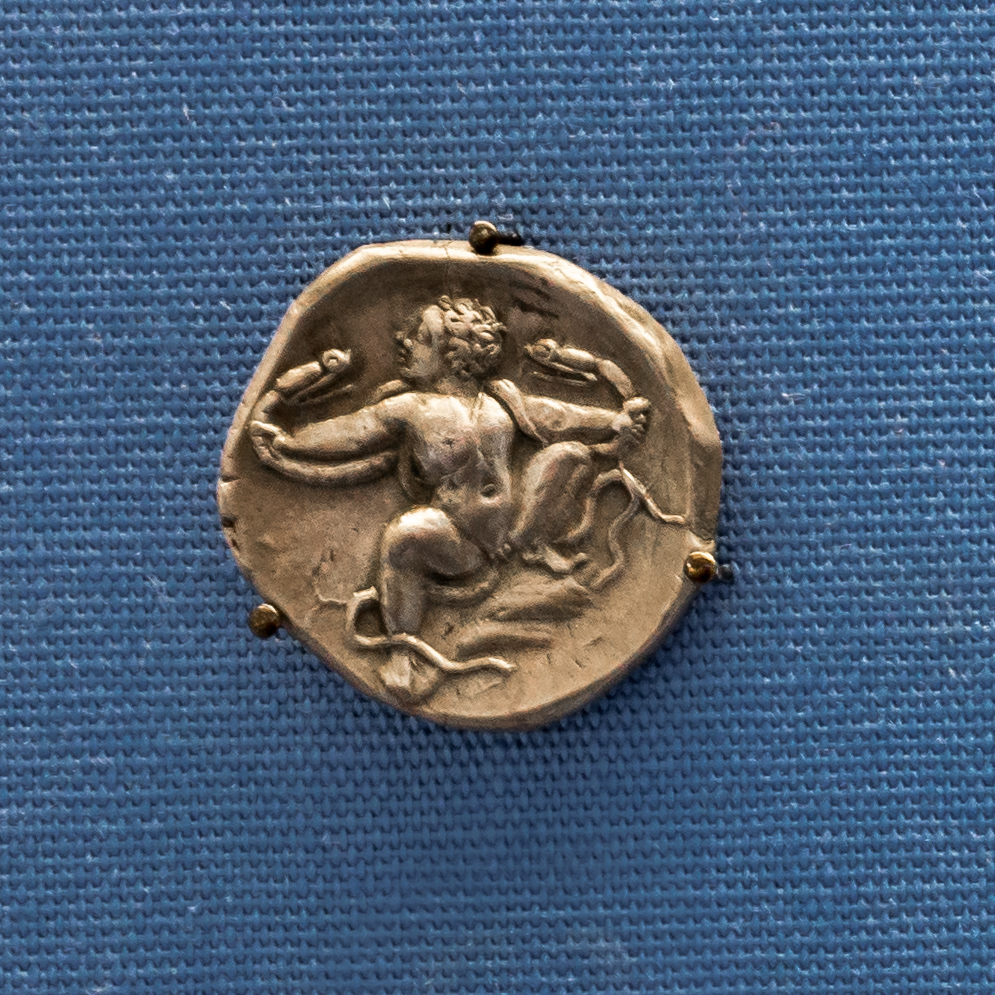
Silver stater of Croton: 4th cent. BC. Heracles and snakes (rev.)

According to Andrew Lang, the "vivacity and tenderness of the pictures of domestic life, and the minute knowledge of expiatory ceremonies" seem to mark this idyll as the work of Theocritus. The following poem, Idyll XXV, also deals with an adventure of Heracles, and Lang thinks it not impossible that Theocritus wrote, or contemplated writing, a Heraclean epic, in a series of idylls.

According to J. M. Edmonds, "This epic poem, unlike the Hylas, is not an artistic whole." Of the historical context, he writes, "Such a poem would doubtless be acceptable at the Alexandrian court in the early years of the child who was afterwards Ptolemy III. For the Ptolemies claimed descent from Heracles."

== See also ==
- Epyllion

== Sources ==
- Acosta-Hughes, Benjamin (2012). "Miniaturizing the Huge: Hercules on a Small Scale (Theocritus Idylls 13 and 24)". In Baumbach, Manuel; Bär, Silvio (eds.). Brill’s Companion to Greek and Latin Epyllion and Its Reception. Leiden, The Netherlands: Brill. pp. 245–57. doi:10.1163/9789004233058_012. ISBN 9789004233058.

Attribution:

- Edmonds, J. M., ed. (1919). The Greek Bucolic Poets (3rd ed.). William Heinemann. pp. 289–99.
- Lang, Andrew, ed. (1880). Theocritus, Bion, and Moschus. London: Macmillan and Co. pp. 117–23.
