= Idyll XXII =

Poem by Theocritus

Idyll XXII, also called Διόσκουροι ('The Dioscuri'), is a poem by the 3rd-century BC Greek poet Theocritus. It is a hymn, in the Homeric manner, to Castor and Polydeuces.

== Summary ==
This hymn to Castor and Polydeuces consists, first, of a prelude common to both, and secondly, of two main parts concerned one with Polydeuces and the other with Castor. The first of these, in a combination of the Epic style with the dialogue, tells how Polydeuces fought fisticuffs with Amycus on his way to Colchis, and the second how, when the brothers carried off the daughters of Leucippus, Castor fought Lynceus with spear and sword.

== Analysis ==
Andrew Lang compares the "life and truth of the descriptions of nature, and of the boxing-match" in the Theocritean text with the "frigid manner" of Apollonius Rhodius on the same theme.

== See also ==
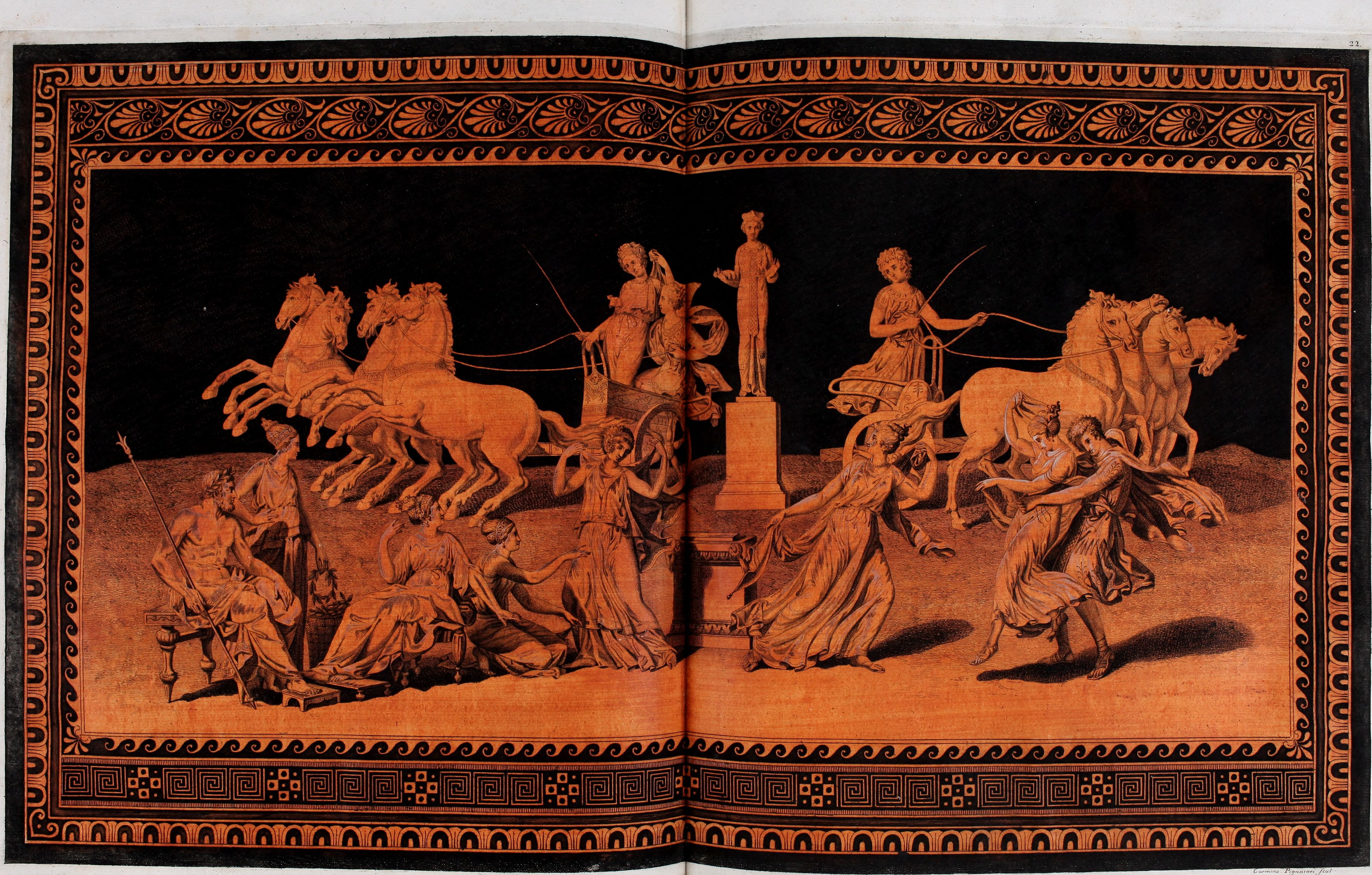
The rape of the Leucippides, engraved after an Attic hydria

- Epyllion

== Sources ==
Attribution:

- Edmonds, J. M., ed. (1919). The Greek Bucolic Poets (3rd ed.). William Heinemann. pp. 253–75.
- Lang, Andrew, ed. (1880). Theocritus, Bion, and Moschus. London: Macmillan and Co. pp. 103–12.
