= Jenny Strauss Clay =

American classical philologist

- Born: January 13, 1942 (age 84); Cairo, Kingdom of Egypt
- Occupations: William R. Kenan, Jr. Professor of Classics Emerita
- Spouse: Diskin Clay (m. 1963; div. 1977)
- Children: Andreia Clay
- Parent(s): Leo Strauss and Miriam Strauss (adoptive); Eliezer Paul Kraus and Bettina Strauss (by birth)

Academic background
- Education: Reed College, University of Chicago
- Alma mater: University of Washington

Academic work
- Discipline: Classics
- Sub-discipline: Ancient Greek literature

Jenny Ann Strauss Clay (born 13 January 1942) is an American classical scholar, known above all for her work on Homer, Hesiod and the Homeric Hymns.

== Biography ==
She was born on 13 January 1942 in Cairo, the daughter of Eliezer Paul Kraus and Bettina Strauss. Her mother died ten days after giving birth, and Kraus sent her to a kibbutz near Jerusalem. Following Kraus's suicide in 1944, she was adopted by her uncle Leo Strauss and his wife Miriam, who arranged for her to be brought to live with them in New York. The family then moved to Chicago in 1948, following Leo Strauss's appointment as Hutchins Professor at the University of Chicago.

In 1958, she began her studies at Reed College, where she met Diskin Clay, who also later became a noted classical scholar; she accompanied him to France for a year following his graduation from Reed in 1960. She herself graduated from Reed in 1962, and returned to Chicago, marrying Diskin Clay in 1963 and receiving an MA in Greek and French from the University of Chicago in 1964. She then joined her husband in Seattle, where he was already a graduate student at the University of Washington, and enrolled as a doctoral student herself. She completed her doctorate in 1970, with a dissertation titled "The Voices of the Gods: Divine Speeches in the Odyssey".

Upon her husband's appointment to a position at Johns Hopkins University in 1975, she was appointed as a part-time adjunct professor there. After their divorce in 1977, she held a junior fellowship at the Center for Hellenic Studies and then a temporary lectureship at the University of California, Irvine, before being appointed assistant professor at the University of Virginia in 1979. She was promoted to associate professor in 1985 and to full professor in 1990, and in 2006 became the William R. Kenan, Jr. Professor of Classics.

She chaired the Classics Department at the University of Virginia from 1993 to 1999. She also served in several roles within the Society for Classical Studies, including as Vice President for Research (1997–2001) and as President (2006–2007).

In 2012, she received a Humboldt Research Award, on the nomination of Markus Asper, Professor of Greek at the Humboldt University of Berlin. In 2018, she was honoured with a Festschrift titled Gods and Mortals in Greek and Latin Poetry: Studies in Honor of Jenny Strauss Clay, which includes a detailed biography by Ward W. Briggs, as well as a full list of publications up to that date.

Since her retirement from the University of Virginia, she has been the William R. Kenan, Jr. Professor Emerita.

== Selected publications ==
=== Monographs ===
- Clay, Jenny Strauss (1983). The Wrath of Athena: Gods and Men in the Odyssey. Princeton University Press. ISBN 9780691065748.
- Clay, Jenny Strauss (1989). The Politics of Olympus: Form and Meaning in the Major Homeric Hymns. Princeton University Press. ISBN 9780691067759.
- Clay, Jenny Strauss (2003). Hesiod's Cosmos. Cambridge University Press. ISBN 9781139440585.
- Clay, Jenny Strauss (2011). Homer's Trojan Theater: Space, Vision, and Memory in the Iliad. Cambridge University Press. ISBN 9780521149488.

=== Editions ===
- Clay, Jenny Strauss; Vergados, Athanassios (2025). Hesiod: Theogony. Cambridge University Press. ISBN 9781107483484.

=== Edited volumes ===
- Schiesaro, Alessandro; Mitsis, Phillip; Clay, Jenny Strauss, eds. (1993). Mega Nepios: Il destinatorio nell'epos didascalico. Giardini.
- Clay, Jenny Strauss; Malkin, Irad; Tzifopoulos, Yannis Z., eds. (2017). Panhellenes at Methone: graphê in Late Geometric and Protoarchaic Methone. De Gruyter. ISBN 9783110501278.
