= Rape of Persephone =

Narrative of Greek and Roman mythology

The Rape of Persephone, or Abduction of Persephone, is a classical mythological subject in Western art, depicting the abduction of Persephone by Hades. In this context, the word Rape refers to the traditional translation of the Latin raptus ('seized' or 'carried off') which refers to bride kidnapping rather than the potential ensuing sexual violence.

== Mythological background ==
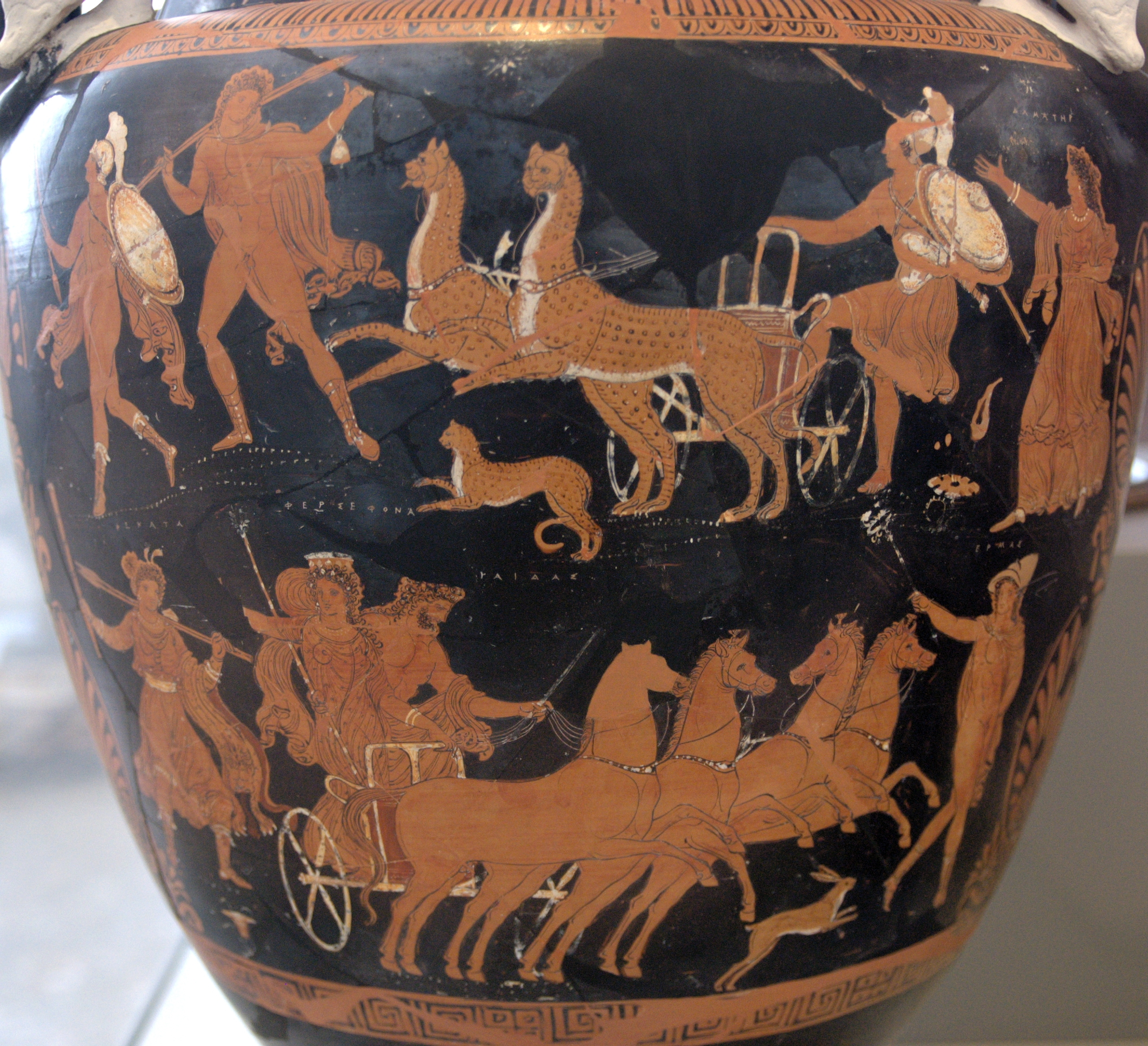
Rape of Persephone. Hades with his horses and Persephone (down). An Apulian red-figure volute krater, c. 340 BC. Antikensammlung Berlin

Persephone is the daughter of Zeus and Demeter. Hades wished to make her his wife, so he got permission from her father Zeus and help from Gaia to abduct her into the Underworld. When Persephone was picking flowers in a field, Hades emerged on his chariot from a crack on the earth, and carried off the unwilling Persephone; only Hecate and Helios witnessed the abduction, and later told Demeter.

== Paintings ==
=== Allori ===
This painting on a large wooden panel is entitled The Abduction of Proserpine. It was painted in 1570, and spent most of its life residing in the Villa Salviati after being commissioned by the Salviati family.

=== Rembrandt ===
Painted in around 1631, The Abduction of Proserpina has largely been attributed to Rembrandt. Although the painting remains unsigned, the style and composition is highly indicative of being a legitimate Rembrandt. It is currently displayed as a part of the permanent collection of the Gemäldegalerie, Berlin.

=== Rubens ===
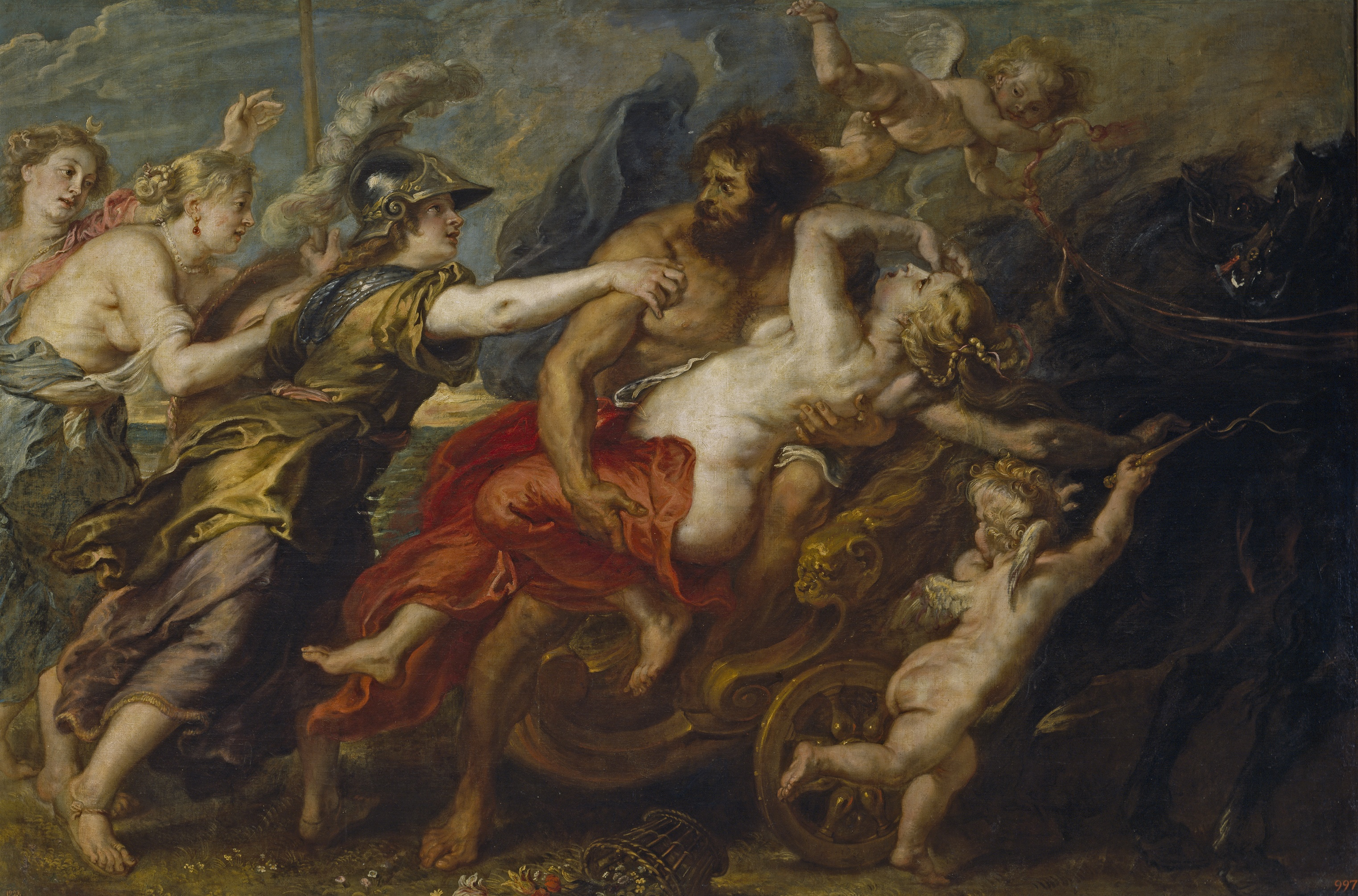
Peter Paul Rubens' The Rape of Proserpina, 1636-1637

Created in 1636 and 1637, Peter Paul Rubens depicted the abduction of Persephone in a piece entitled The Rape of Proserpine. The piece was intended to decorate the lost Torre de la Parada, and as such was owned by the Spanish Royal family.

This was copied later in the 17th century by Juan Bautista Martínez del Mazo in oil on canvas under the name of El Rapto de Proserpina, and later again reproduced by the Real Establecimiento Litográfico de Madrid in the 19th century for the purpose of printing and distribution.

=== Giordano ===
As part of a set of oil studies intended to be used for painting the ceiling frescoes in the Palazzo Medici Riccardi in Florence, the Mythological Scene with the Rape of Proserpine was created with the intention of being presented to Marquess Francesco Riccardi for approval before being painted in the palace. Currently, ten of the twelve oil studies created between 1682 and 1685 reside in the National Gallery.

=== Other paintings ===
The Rape of Persephone, a painting in the Macedonian Tomb I in Vergina (Aegae), dating from the mid 4th century BC. This in situ mural is mostly indistinguishable, other than the figures of Hades and Persephone themselves on a chariot.

== Sculpture ==
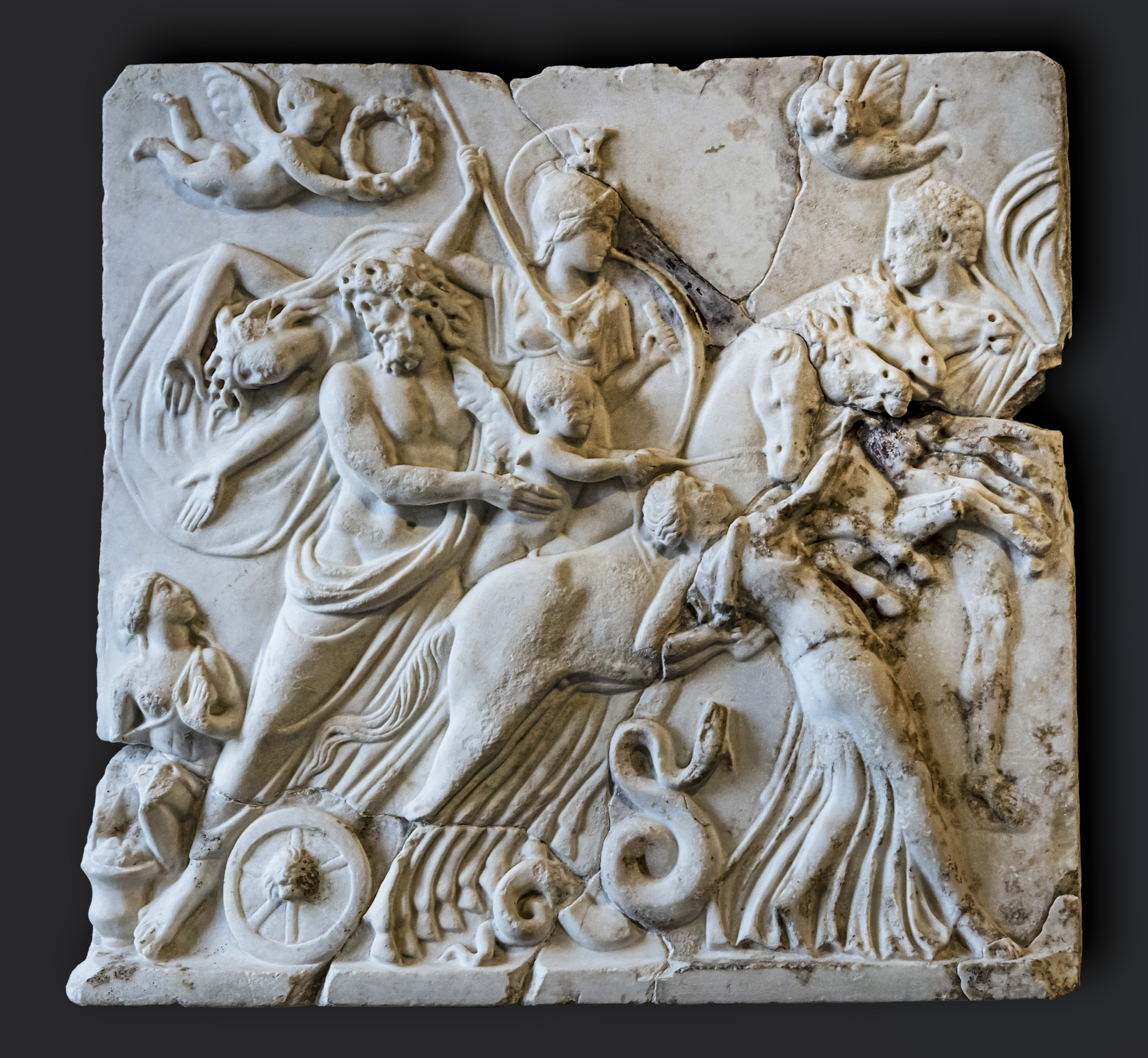
The Rape of Persephone, musée Saint-Raymond, Toulouse, inv. Ra 152

Examples include:

- The Rape of Persephone from the Roman villa of Chiragan, in Musée Saint-Raymond, Toulouse
- The Rape of Persephone, by Pinturicchio, in the vault of the Piccolomini Library in the Duomo, Siena
- The Rape of Proserpina by the Italian artist Gian Lorenzo Bernini, a large Baroque marble sculptural group, executed between 1621 and 1622
