= Irene Peirano Garrison =

American philologist

Academic background
- Education: Oriel College, Oxford (B.A., 2002), Harvard University (Ph.D., 2007)

Academic work
- Discipline: Classics
- Institutions: Yale University (2007-2020); Harvard University
- Main interests: Literature

Irene Peirano Garrison is an American philologist and Pope Professor of the Latin Language and Literature at Harvard University. She studied at Oriel College, Oxford and Harvard, then was at the Yale Classics department from 2007–2020. She is known for her works on Roman poetry and its relation to rhetoric, literary criticism and scholarship, both ancient and modern.

== Books ==
- The Rhetoric of the Roman Fake: Latin Pseudepigrapha in context (CUP, 2012)
- Persuasion, Rhetoric and Roman Poetry (CUP, 2019)
