= Idyll XXV =

Greek poem attributed to Theocritus

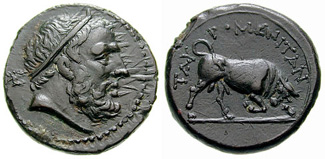
Coin of Tauromenion: 3rd cent. BC. Diademed head of Heracles (obverse); bull butting (reverse)

Idyll XXV, later titled Ηρακλής Λεοντοφόνος ('Heracles the Lion-slayer') by Callierges, is a poem doubtfully attributed to the 3rd-century BC Greek poet Theocritus. This is an idyll of the epic sort, and is sometimes categorised as an epyllion. In the course of the narrative, Heracles visits the herds of King Augeas (to clean their stalls was one of his twelve labours), and, after an encounter with a bull, describes to the king's son his battle with the lion of Nemea.

== Summary ==
This poem comprises three distinct parts, one of which still bears its separate title. The first part, which bears the traditional stage-direction Heracles to the Husbandman, is concerned first with a description of the great farm of Augeias or Augeas, king of the Epeians of Elis—the same whose stables Heracles at another time cleaned out—put into the mouth of a garrulous old ploughman of whom Heracles has asked where he can find the king; then the old man undertakes to show the mysterious stranger the way, and as they draw near the homestead they have a Homeric meeting with the barking dogs. The second part bears the title The Visitation. It tells how the enormous herd of cattle given by the Sun to his child Augeas returned in the evening from pasture, how the king and his son Phyleus took Heracles to see the busy scene in the farmyard, and how Heracles encountered the finest bull in the whole herd. In the third part, which has no traditional title, Heracles, accompanied by the king's son, is on his way to the town, and their conversation leads to Heracles' telling how he slew the Nemean lion.

== Attribution ==
'Then marvelled the king himself, and his son, the warlike Phyleus, ... when they beheld the exceeding strength of the son of Amphitryon'

According to Edwardian classicist J. M. Edmonds, the poet's interest in the details of the rural life, and in the description of the herds of King Augeas, seem to mark this poem as the work of Theocritus. However, there is no ancient authority for ascribing the work to Theocritus, and it has been doubted whether the poem is by him. It was once attributed by learned conjecture to various writers of an older age, and most modern scholars doubt its authenticity.

== Analysis ==
Andrew Lang thinks this idyll, or fragment, is incomplete. However, according to J. M. Edmonds, it is not really a fragment, but pretends by a literary convention to be three "books" taken from an Odyssey, or rather Heracleia, in little.

== See also ==
- Heracles (Euripides)
- Women of Trachis

== Sources ==
- Gow, A. S. F. (October 1943). "Ηρακλης Λεοντοφονος (Theocr. Id. xxv)". The Classical Quarterly. 37 (3/4): 93–100. JSTOR 637253.
- Schmitz, T. A. (2012). "Herakles in Bits and Pieces: Id. 25 in the Corpus Theocriteum". In Baumbach, Manuel; Bär, Silvio (eds.). Brill's Companion to Greek and Latin Epyllion and Its Reception. Leiden, The Netherlands: Brill. pp. 259–82. doi:10.1163/9789004233058_013. ISBN 9789004233058.

Attribution:

- Edmonds, J. M., ed. (1919). The Greek Bucolic Poets (3rd ed.). William Heinemann. pp. 300–23.
- Lang, Andrew, ed. (1880). Theocritus, Bion, and Moschus. London: Macmillan and Co. pp. 124–34.
