= Monotype typefaces =

The Monotype typefaces were developed by the Lanston Monotype Machine Company and its successors, originally as metal type for use in printing presses. Monotype Imaging has the rights to the original designs, and many more designs from other sources. The remains of the production archive and what is left of the machines were sent to the Type Museum (later the Type Archive) in London, England. There the original matrices can still be accessed and parts of the old machines ordered. The collection itself is the property of the British Science Museum. The survival of the Type Archive was threatened by worsening economic conditions and the need for substantial repairs to the building.

== Hot metal ==
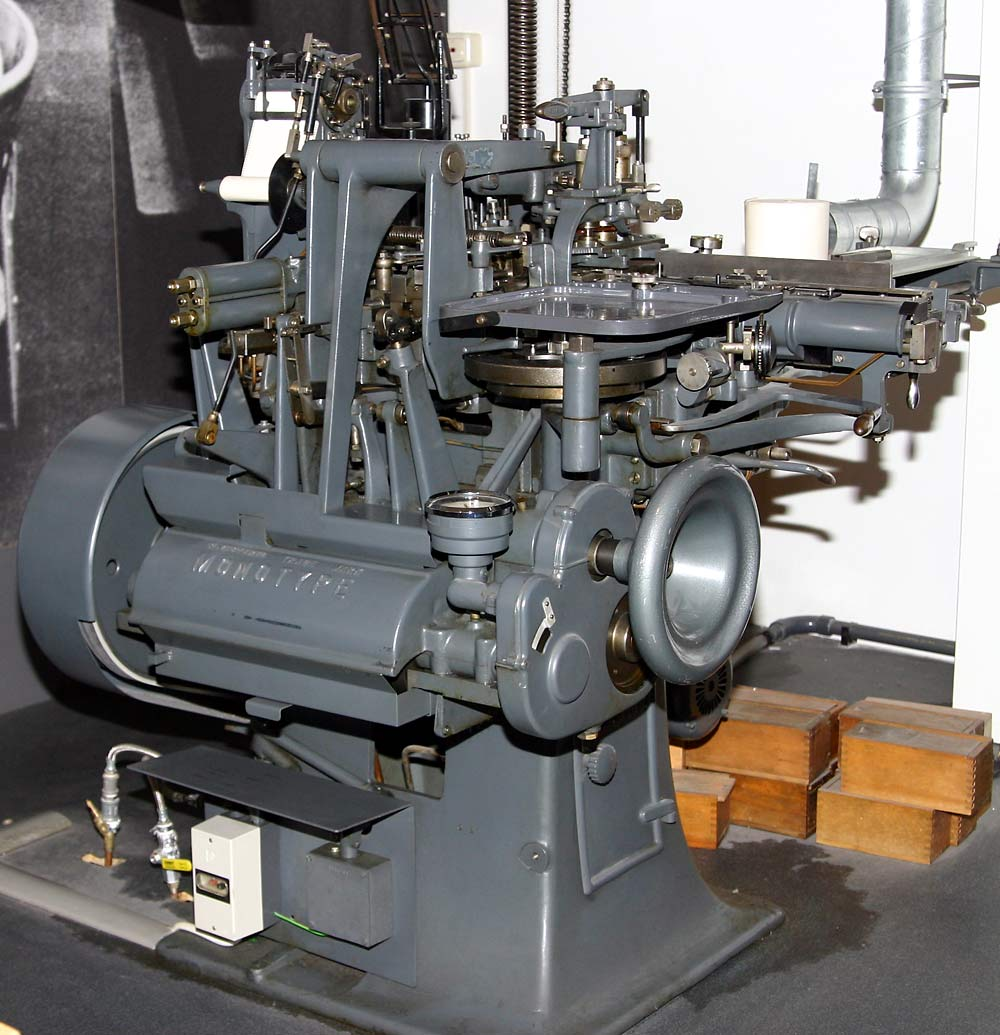
A Monotype caster

The Lanston Monotype Machine Company and the Monotype Corporation produced a long list of fonts, which were identified by names and serial numbers. That type design eventually acquired a very good name and the "Monotype" brand was synonymous with high quality and reliability.

In their name much typographic research on historical character designs from the early years of typography has been carried out. Many of the letters were produced as "revivals", including characters in Garamond, Baskerville, Bodoni, Bembo, Caslon and many other typefaces.

The major difference between the two firms is that the American fonts do not match the English fonts. Letters with the same name had in most cases a different designer, and their appearance and implementation differ. The identification numbers do not all correspond.

The matrices of the two firms also differ in terms of depth, the image inside the matrix, implementation, and size. For example, the American matrices are shallower by .01 in (0.25 mm), and consequently the interior of American foundry moulds need to be higher to produce characters with a type height of 0.918 in (23.3 mm). This was one of many measures taken by the two Monotype companies to divide the world market between themselves. For example, the American company served the American and the Canadian markets. The British company, The Monotype Corporation Ltd. in Salfords, had many customers in India, Africa, and Asia. For these countries many non-Latin typefaces were created for printing in Hebrew, Javanese, Sanskrit, Sinhala, Thai, and other languages.

The composition-caster machines of the Monotype system produced ready-to-use composed pages with text consisting of single pieces of type. The machine provided filled lines, justifying them by adding spaces of varying widths. These ending machines were controlled with a paper ribbon. Typing the texts on keyboards was manual work that took much more time than casting. A composition-caster needed the ribbons of at least three separate keyboards. Correction of the final composition was accomplished by simply replacing the moveable type. The lines did not need to be recast, as with Linotype machines.

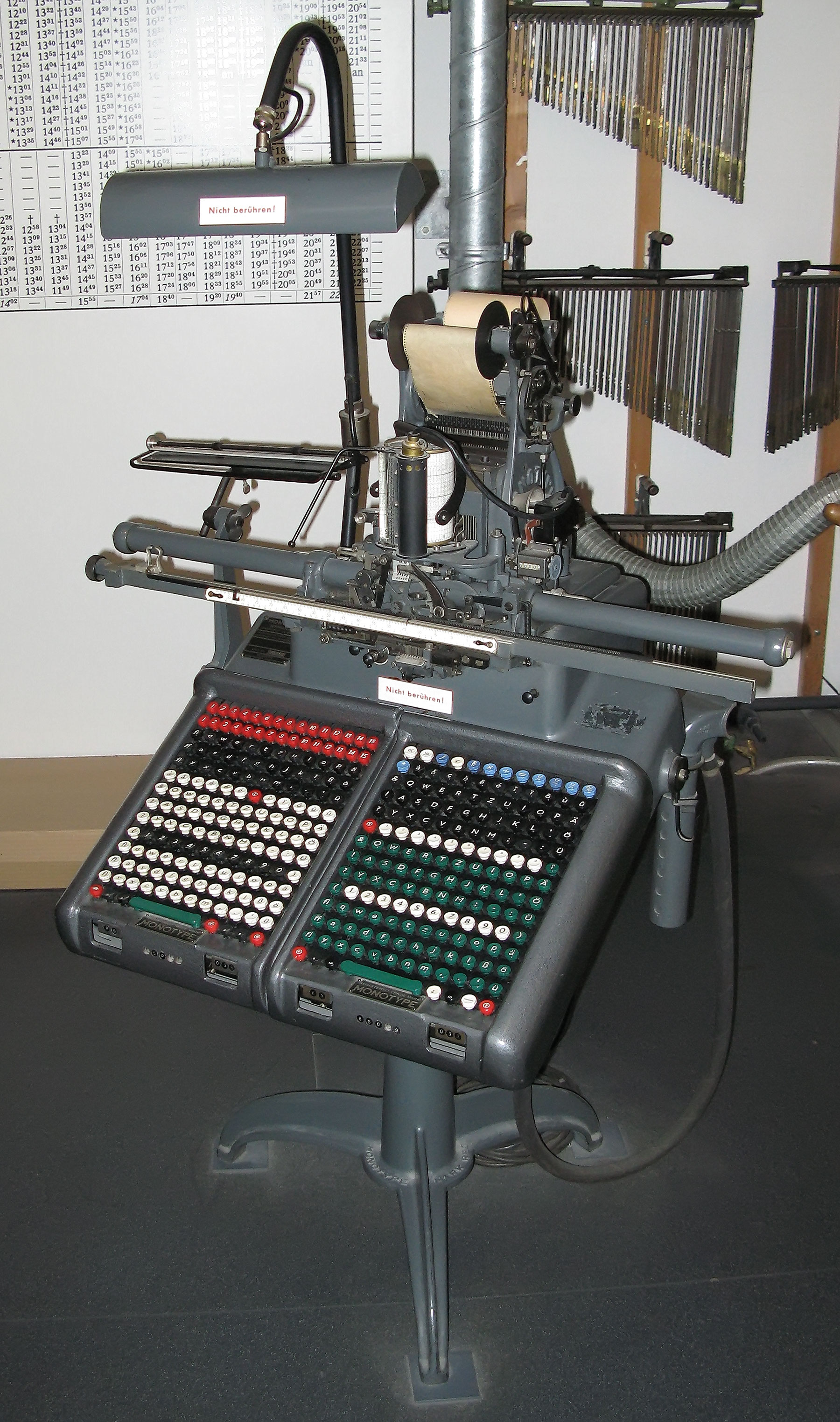
A Monotype keyboard; the tape reel or ribbon being produced is at the top

These composition-casters could produce type in sizes up to 14 point pica or Didot font width. "Large-composition" customized machines and moulds could provide composition up to 36 points. The matrices are correspondingly larger and there is room for only one alphabet in the die case. For this reason one machine-run could not provide composition in both Roman and italic typeface, so additional hand work was required in such cases.

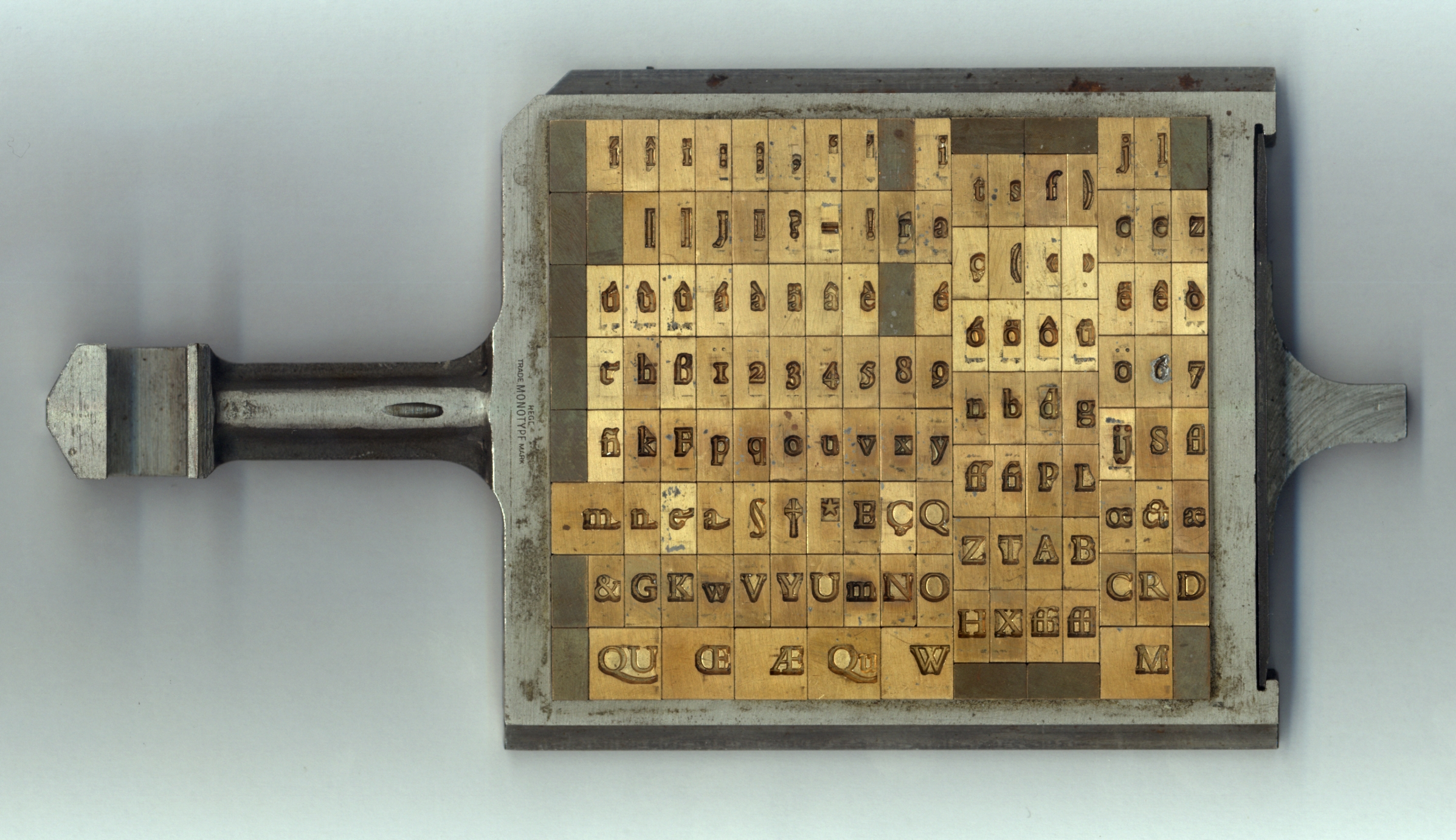
A Monotype matrix case for large composition

Type for hand-composing was also cast with Monotype machines; all characters up to 36pt, and rules, could be cast on a large-composition machine. Another machine was the "super-caster" or "supra", which could cast single type. After conversion it could also be used to cast any material needed in print shops, including reglettes, ornaments, and similar designs, as well as characters up to 72 points. There were moulds with inserts for sizes 14 to 36 point. For the even larger sizes of 42, 48, 60 and 72 point another type cast was used. The machine had to be reconfigured for each different type requirement.

== Unit arrangement ==
The width of the hot-lead Monotype type is expressed in units of a set. The widest letter in the alphabet, usually the capital "W", was measured in quarter-pica units, a unit being 1/18 part of this width.

The unit width is calculated as follows for a 12-set example.

- 1 pica = 1/6 inch
- 1 standard point = 1/12 of a pica = 1/72 inch = 0.013889 inch
- 1 unit = 1/4 of a pica = 0.4166667 inch
- 1 unit 1 set = 1/18 × 1/12 × 1/6 = 1/1296 inch = 0.000771605 inch
- 1 unit 12 set = 12/1296 = 0.00925926 inch

All characters were designed to have widths a whole number of units of the set. 5, 6, 7, 8, 9, 10, up to 18 or even more.

- 5 units 12 set = 0.046296 inch
- 6 units 12 set = 0.055555
- 7 units 12 set = 0.064815

.....

- 18 units 12 set = 0.1667 inch

English and American manuals use a different size for the pica: the new-pica = 0.1660 inch. On the European mainland all wedges and tables in the manuals are based on the "old" pica = 0.1667 inch and those wedges can be identified by the extra capital E (= English). That gives small differences in the tables in the various manuals. In practice, however, these differences are so small that they make only little difference when cast with a S5-E wedge or a S5 wedge based on the new-pica. All character are designed to have as width a whole number of units of the set.

So, for instance, A=14, B=13, C=14... a=8, b,d,h,k,n,p,q=10, c=8 ... The list with these widths is called the "unit-arrangement" (UA). Different fonts can have the same UA. In some font designs the unit-arrangement can be different for each point size, for example, with the Lutetia (typeface) and some other fonts of Jan van Krimpen. These UAs are essential for the layout of the matrix case, in which the matrices are sorted into rows by the unit widths. The various "unit-arrangements" have been given numbers.

== Long and short descenders ==
The lowercase characters g, j, p, q, y have descenders. In italic typefaces f and the "long s" may also have descenders.

Many of the older fonts were intended mainly for use in newspaper columns. Times New Roman is a good example, but there were many others. The descenders were kept as short as possible in such fonts so that all the text could be set with the same line spacing. However, for many fonts for luxury productions longer variants of the descenders were also available—the lining would usually need to be adjusted to accommodate them when casting.

== Letterpress printing ==
The design of fonts for letterpress printing needs to be adjusted for this technique. The reason is that the type is printed with some force on the paper, pressing the ink on the type out to the edges of the letter. The center of the character is accordingly printed a bit lighter than the edges. This results in what is called a "bead edge". It is further enhanced because not only the surface of the type get inked, but also the bevels around it, which also contributes to the visual effect of the printed typeface, as can be readily seen with a magnifying glass.

The bead edge and bright centre in print suggest a calligraphic typeface. And with letterpress there is a much wider choice of suitable, often more expensive, paper types that can be printed.

== Computer adjustments ==
After the "hot metal" firms ceased production because of the transition from letterpress to offset printing in more and more printing companies, with Lanston Monotype being the first to do so in America, the font designs needed adjustment for computer use. There is a difference compared with the old hot-metal characters since the fixed relationship between the width of the letters in the unit arrangement is often experienced as a disadvantage. Discussion of this problem has long been going on, for example by Jan van Krimpen.

The design of a lead type cannot be copied without some adjustments since the pressure on lead type during printing presses the ink sideways, and the final appearance of the letter on paper is wider than the surface of the lead character. This extra width is not the same at all places around the character. It depends on the paper surface used, the pressure, the type of press, whether cylinder or platten, and many other factors.

Many digital fonts from the early digital age have this characteristic defect. The metal surface was simply copied, the result being that the color of the printed pages is far too light. In offset or other modern printing techniques, the typeface on the plate and on the printed letter now match much more closely. The use of mostly coated papers with offset types also has an effect. During the type design process all this should be taken into account since simple design drawing of the surface of a lead letter without any adjustment for offset or computer printing will not produce a good result.

== List of typefaces ==
The alphabetical list below refers primarily to the fonts produced by the English "hot metal" Monotype company. The numbers mentioned below are from the English "specimen-blades", four editions of the booklets "Monotype book of information", and some additional information from the London Type Museum.

In the 1960s many Monotype fonts were discontinued. The "patterns" for the originals from which the punches were created, the punches, and the whole stock of remaining matrices were destroyed. The font has disappeared except for the matrices in the possession of various printers. Sample sheets of these fonts are particularly difficult to find and are lacking in many collections.

A small number of American letter designs are added to the list, designated by "Am" and their number. American matrices differ from those in England. American matrices were 0.001 in (0.025 mm) less deeply engraved. Consequently, the American moulds were higher internally by that amount compared with moulds from the factory in Salfords UK. Consequently, American matrices on an English cast produce a low letter. English matrices on American moulds produce French-height type.

The list of computer letters from Monotype Imaging, Inc. is constantly being modified and can be best consulted on the website of the company.

=== Latin fonts ===
==== A ====
- Acier

297: Acier (never released)
319: Acier Grey and White (never released)

- Albertus

481: Albertus Roman

introduction: 1935
display matrices:

size:	14pt	18pt	24pt	36pt	48pt	60pt	72pt
line:	T.1848	T.2363	T.3166	T.4754	T.6418	and T.8070	T.9680

538: Albertus bold titling Roman

introduction: 1938
display matrices:

size:	14pt	18pt	24pt	30pt	36pt	42pt	48pt	60pt	72pt
line:	T.1533	T.1985	T.2652	T.3255	T.3974	T.4675	T.5358	T.6720	T.8070

534: Albertus light Roman

introduction: 1940
display matrices, one size: 24pt line .2652

324: Albertus titling Roman (1940 ?)

display matrices:

size:	14pt	18pt	24pt	30pt	36pt	42pt	48pt	60pt	72pt
line:	T.1848	T.2363	T.3166	T.3884	T.4754	T.5606	T.6418	T.8070	T.9680

- Albion

__5: Albion Roman

composition matrices UA.2 = 6pt - 12pt

size:	6pt	8pt	10pt	12pt
set:	6.75	8	9.25	11.25
line:	M.1235	M.1270	M.1305	M.1360

_42: Albion (No 2) Roman

composition matrices UA.2 = 6.5pt - 12pt

size:	6.5pt	7.5pt	9pt	10pt	11pt	12pt	13pt
set:	7.75	8	9	9.75	10.5	11.5	12.5
line:	M.1235	M.1238	M.1270	M.1300	M.1320	M.1360	M.1390

_63: Albion Roman

UA.2 : 6.5 pt - 13pt

size:	6pt	7D	9pt	10pt	11pt	12pt	13pt
set:	6.5	7.5	8.25	9.75	9.5	10.75	11.5
line:	M.1224	M.1250	M.1270	M.1290	M.1320	M.1360	M.1390

_70: Albion (No 4) Roman

composition matrices: UA.2 : 6.5pt - 13pt

size:	6.5pt	7.5pt (7D)	9pt	10pt	11pt	12pt	13pt
set:	7.75	8.5	9.75	10	11	12.25	13
line:	M.1225	M.1243	M.1280	M.1300	M.1327	M.1360	M.1387

_74: Albion Extended Roman

composition matrices: UA.3: 6D - 13pt

size:	6D	7D	9pt	10pt	11pt	12pt	13pt (12D)
set:	7.75	8.5	9.75	10	11	12.25	13
line:	M.1225	M.1240	M.1260	M.1290	M.1320	M.1360	M.1390

display matrices:

size:	14pt	18pt	22pt	24pt	30pt	36pt	42pt	48pt	60pt	72pt
line:	T.1533	T.1995	T.2308	T.2640	T.3194	T.3884	T.4576	T.5268	T.6651	T.7930

264: Albion (in 1965 taken out of production)

- Aldine Bembo

270: Aldine Bembo (see: Bembo 270)
370: Aldine Bembo Titling (see: Bembo Titling)

- Anchor

491: Anchor (taken out of production, "cancelled")

- Andalé Mono

Only produced for computer use.

- Angulus

555: Angulus Roman/italic

composition matrices: UA.474: only one size available 4.4pt

size:	4.5D
set:	5.5
line:	M.1185

- Antique

207: Antique Roman/italic (see: 207 Antique Old Style)
307: Antique (in 1965 taken out of production)

composition matrices: U.A. = 70, only: 5.5pt and 7pt

size:	5.5pt (5D)	7pt (7D)
set:	6.25	8.5
line:	.1262	.1314

407: Antique (in 1965 taken out of production)

composition matrices: UA = 70

407-9 (8D)	9.5 set	lining: M.1338

354: Antique (No. 2) (in 1967 taken out of production)

composition matrices: UA = 335

size:	8 (8D)	10 (10D)	12 (12D)
set:	10.75	13.5	16
line:	M.1348	M.1440	M.1525

_74: Antique Extended (see Ionic, see: Albion Extended)
153: Antique Extended (see: Albion Extended)
223: Antique Heavy (see: Devonshire Bold)
224: Antique Heavy Condensed (see: Devonshire Bold Condensed)

- Antique Latin

__9: Antique Latin (see: Latin Antique)
_60: Antique Latin (see: Latin Antique No. 2)
_78: Antique Latin (see: Latin Antique No. 3)
_84: Antique Latin (see: Latin Antique No. 4)

- Antique Old Style

__3: Antique Old Style No. 3 Roman/italic

composition matrices: UA.2 = 6pt - 12pt

size:	6pt (6D)	7pt (7D)	8pt (8D)	9pt (8D)	10pt (9D)	11pt (10D)	12pt (11D)
set:	6.5	7.75	8.5	9.25	9.75	10.5	12
line:	M.1200	M.1240	M.1250	M.1280	M.1300	M.1320	M.1355

161: Antique Old Style No. 3 Roman/italic

composition matrices: Roman UA.29, italic UA.54, 6pt - 12pt

size:	6pt (6D)	8pt (8D)	9pt (9D)	10pt (9D)	11pt (10D)	12pt (11D)
set:	6.5	8	8.75	9.5	10.5	11.75
line:	M.1220	M.1250	M.1266	M.1294	M.1331	M.1410

display matrices:

size:	14pt	18pt	24pt	30pt	36pt	42pt	48pt	60pt	72pt
line:	T.1533	T.1948	T.2640	T.3194	T.3884	T.4576	T.5268	T.6651	T.7930

124: Antique Old Style No. 1 synonyms: Old Style Antique and Series 124 (in 1967 taken out of production)

all descenders available in two versions short- and long-descenders
composition matrices: UA.1, 6pt - 12pt (6pt is missing on older specimen blades)

size:	6pt (6D)	8pt short desc. op 7pt (7D)	8pt (8D)	9pt short desc. op 8pt (8D)	9pt (9D)	10pt (9D)	11pt (10D)	12pt (12D)
set:	6.5	8.5	8.5	9.25	9.25	9.75	10.5	11.75
line:	M.1200	M.1250	M.1250	M.1280	M.1280	M.1300	M.1320	M.1355

207: Antique Old Style Roman/italic

composition matrices: UA.70 = 6.5pt - 10pt

size:	6.5pt(6D)	7pt	8pt
set:	7.75	7.75	8.75
line:	M.1268	M.1268	M.1314

- Arial

No matrices for hot-metal

- Arrighi Italic

252: Arrighi Italic (see: Centaur)

- Ashley Crawford

238: Ashley Crawford (cancelled in 1967)

display matrices:

size:	14pt	18pt	24pt	30pt	36pt
line:	.1672	.2145	.2896	.3484	.4123

279: Ashley Crawford Plain (cancelled in 1967)

display matrices:

size:	14pt	18pt	24pt	30pt	36pt
line:	.1748	.2243	.2996	.3684	.4494

- Ashley Script

574: Ashley Script

display matrices: 14-72 pt

size:	14pt	18pt	24pt	30pt	36pt	42pt	48pt	60pt	72pt
line:	T.1364	T.1751	T.2338	T.2864	T.3494	T.4106	T.4708	T.5910	T.7090

- Avenir

No matrices for hot-metal

==== B ====
- Barbou

178: Barbou Roman/italic

composition matrices: UA.447: 8 - 12pt

size:	8pt (8D)	9pt (8D)	10pt (9D)	11pt (10D)	12pt (12D)
set:	7.25	8	8.5	9.25	10
line:	M.1270	M.1295	M.1300	M.1327	M.1360

- Baskerville

169: Baskerville Roman/italic

composition matrices: UA.43: 6D - 14pt

size:	6pt (6D)	7 (7D)	8pt (8D)	9pt (8D)	9.5pt (9D)	10pt (9D)	11pt (10D)	12pt (11D)	14pt (14D)
set:	6.75	7.5	8.25	9	9.5	10	10.75	12	13
line:	M.1220	M.1235	M.1250	M.1266	M.1291	M.1294	M.1320	M.1360	M.1520

large-composition matrices: 14-18pt Roman UA.136, italic UA.141:
22pt: only Roman, 24pt: Roman UA.136, italic UA.150

size:	14pt (14D)	16pt (16D)	18pt (18D)	22pt (22D)	24pt (24D)
set:	13	14.5	15.25	19	21
line:	T.1395	T.1600	T.1672	T.2040	T.2226

display matrices:

size:	14pt	16pt	18pt	20pt	22pt	24pt	30pt	36pt	42pt	48pt	60pt	72pt
line:	T.1395	T.1600	T.1672	T.1853	T.2040	T.2226	T.2780	T.3332	T.3886	T.4440	T.5685	T.6830

312: Baskerville bold Roman/italic

composition matrices: UA.332: 6D - 14pt

size:	6pt (6D)	7 (7D)	8pt (8D)	9pt (8D)	9.5pt (9D)	10pt (9D)	11pt (10D)	12pt (11D)	14pt (14D)
set:	6.75	7.5	8.25	9	9.5	10	10.75	12	13
line:	M.1220	M.1235	M.1250	M.1266	M.1291	M.1294	M.1320	M.1360	M.1520

display matrices:

size:	14pt	18pt	24pt	30pt	36pt	48pt	60pt	72pt
line:	T.1395	T.1672	T.2226	T.2784	T.3332	T.4440	T.5685	T.6830

313: Baskerville bold (see: 313 Baskerville Semi-Bold)
377: Baskerville Bold Large Face (cancelled in 1967)

display matrices:

size:	48pt	60pt	72pt
line:	.4992	.6236	.7115

376: Baskerville Bold Titling For Newspaper Headings (cancelled in 1965)

large-composition matrices: UA.374: 14pt, 18pt and 24pt cast at 18pt combined in one matrix frame

size:	14pt	18pt	24pt
set:	18	18
line:	.2075	.2075	.2075

378: Baskerville Bold Titling For Newspaper Headings) (cancelled in 1965)

large-composition matrices: UA.372: 14pt, 18pt and 24pt cast at 18pt combined in one matrix frame

size:	14pt	18pt	24pt
set:	18	18	18
line:	.2213	.2213	.2213

380: Baskerville Extra Bold Titling (cancelled in 1967)

display matrices:

size:	36pt
line:	.3704

312: Baskerville Heavy (see: 312 Baskerville Bold)
313: Baskerville Semi-Bold Roman/italic

composition matrices: UA.332: 6D - 14pt

size:	6pt (6D)	7 (7D)	8pt (8D)	9pt (8D)	9.5pt (9D)	10pt (9D)	11pt (10D)	12pt (11D)	14pt (14D)
set:	6.75	7.5	8.25	9	9.5	10	10.75	12	13
line:	M.1220	M.1235	M.1250	M.1266	M.1291	M.1294	M.1320	M.1360	M.1520

display matrices:

size:	18pt
line:	T.1672

381: Baskerville Titling For Newspaper Headings (cancelled in 1965)

large-composition matrices: UA.372: 14pt, 18pt and 24pt cast at 18pt combined in one die case

size:	14pt	18pt	24pt
set:	18	18	18
line:	.2213	.2213	.2213

- Bell (by Monotype inc. revised version)

341: Bell Roman/italic

composition matrices: UA.314: 8D - 14pt

size:	8pt (8D)	9pt (9D)	10pt (10D)	11pt (11D)	12pt (12D)	14pt (14D)
set:	8.5	9.5	10	11	12	13.25
line:	M.1240	M.1267	M.1285	M.1314	M.1335	M.1385

display matrices:

size:	14pt	18pt	24pt	30pt	36pt
line:	T.1304	T.1711	T.2284	T.2804	T.3424

619: Bell Gothic Roman

composition matrices: UA.445: 6 and 8pt

size:	6pt (6D)	8pt (8D)
set:	7	9
line:	M.1245	M.1310

620: Bell Gothic Bold Roman

composition matrices: UA.445: 6 and 8pt

size:	6pt (6D)	8pt (8D)
set:	7	9
line:	M.1245	M.1310

- Bembo

270: Bembo Roman/italic

composition matrices: UA.91: 6D - 14pt
variants: alternative numerals: F537, F538, alternative capitals: R 203, M 145, R 224

size:
6pt (6D)
7pt (7D)
8pt (8D)
9pt (8D)
10pt (10D)
10.5pt (9D)
11pt (10D)
12pt (11D)
13pt (12D)

14pt (14D)

set:
6.75
7.5
7.5
8.25
8.5
9
9.5
10.25
11
11.5
line:
M.1237
M.1243
M.1243
M.1270
M.1292
M.1312
M.1322
M.1343
M.1378
M.1444

large-composition matrices: 14pt-24pt

size:	14pt (14D)	16pt (16D)	18pt (18D)	24pt (24D)
UA.	91	163	169	169
set:	11.5	13.5	14.5	19.5
line:	T.1344	T.1559	T.1725	T.2302

display matrices:

size:	14pt	16pt	18pt	22pt op 24pt	24pt	30pt	36pt	48pt	60pt	72pt
line:	T.1344	T.1559	T.1725	T.2104	T.2302	T.2824	T.3444	T.4648	T.5821	T.6980

428: Bembo bold Roman/italic

composition matrices: UA.368: 6D - 14pt

size:	6pt (6D)	7D op 8p E	8pt (8D)	9pt (8D)	10pt (10D)	10.5pt (10D)	11pt (10D)	12pt (11D)	13pt (12D)	14pt (14D)
set:	6.75	7.5	7.5	8.25	8.5	9	9.5	10.25	11	11.5
line:	M.1237	M.1243	M.1243	M.1270	M.1293	M.1312	M.1322	M.1353	M.1378	M.1444

large-composition matrices: 14pt-18pt

size:	16pt (16D)	18pt (18D)
UA.	399	399
set:	13.5	14.5
line:	T.1559	T.1725

display matrices:

size:	24pt	30pt	36pt	48pt
line:	T.2302	T.2824	T.3444	T.4648

294: Bembo condensed Italic italic

composition matrices: UA.360: 10pt - 13pt UA.361: 16pt

size:	10pt (10D)	12pt (12D)	13pt (12D)	16pt
set:	8.5	10.25	11	13.5
line:	M.1292	M.1353	M.1378	M.1559

428: Bembo Heavy (see: 428 Bembo Bold)
509: Bembo semi-bold Roman/italic

composition matrices: UA.91: 5.5pt

size:	5.5pt (5.5D)
set:	6.5
line:	M.1235

370: Bembo titling Roman/italic

display matrices:

size:	24pt	30pt	36pt	42pt
line:	T.2942	T.3614	T.4436	T.5196

- Berling

643: Berling Roman/italic (cancelled in 1973)

punches made in cooperation with Berlinska Stilgjuteriet, Lund
composition matrices: UA.495: 6D-12D

size:	6D op 7pt	8D op 9pt	9D op 10pt	10D op 11pt	11Dop 12pt	12D op 13pt
set:	6.5	8.5	9.25	10.25	11.5	12.5
line:	M.1237	M.1311	M.1385	M.1385	M1459	M.1459

644: Berling semi bold Roman

punches made in cooperation with Berlinska Stilgjuteriet, Lund
composition matrices: UA.496: 6D-12D

size:	6D op 7pt	8D op 9pt	9D op 10pt	10D op 11pt	11Dop 12pt	12D op 13pt
set:	6.5	8.5	9.25	10.25	11.5	12.5
line:	M.1237	M.1311	M.1385	M.1385	M1459	M.1459

- Bernard condensed

213: Bernard condensed Roman

display matrices:

size:	14pt	16D op 18pt	20D op 22pt	24D op 30pt	30pt	36D op 36pt	42D op 48pt	48D op 60pt	60D op 72pt	72pt
line:	T.1671	T.2008	T.2520	T.2984	T.3444	T.4474	T.5249	T.6040	T.7570	T.8550

- Blado

119: Blado Italic italic (designed to be used with Poliphilus 170)

composition matrices: UA.53: 10pt - 13pt

size:	10pt (9D)	11pt (10D)	12pt (12D)	13pt (12D)
set:	8.5	9.25	10.75	11.5
line:	M.1299	M.1326	M.1374	M.1399

large-composition matrices: 16pt = UA.142

size:	16pt
set:	13.5
line:	T.1577

display matrices:

size:	24pt
line:	T.2352

- Bodoni

135: Bodoni Roman/italic (synonym: Bodoni no.3)

composition matrices: UA.1: 6pt-13pt, UA.77: 14pt
variants: long descenders and "Large-Face" in 11pt

size:	6pt (6D)	6.5 (6D) op 7pica	7pt (6D)	7.5pt (7D)	8pt (8D)	9pt (8D)	10pt (9D)	11pt (10D)	11pt Large Face	12pt (12D)	13pt (12D)	14pt (14D)
set:	6.5	6.5	7	7.75	7.75	8.5	9.5	10.25	11	11.75	12.75	13.5
line:	M.1164	M.1164	M.1210	M.1238	M.1238	M.1260	M.1279	M.1302	M.1315	M.1347	M.1372	M.1448

large-composition matrices: 16pt, 18pt, 24pt Roman, UA.425 = 24pt italic

size:	16pt (16D)	18pt (18D)	24pt (24D) Roman	24pt italic
UA.	77	77	78	425
set:	15.5	17	23	23
line:	T.1551	T.1741	T.2324	T.2324

display matrices:

size:	14pt	16pt	18pt	22pt op 24pt	24pt	30pt	36pt	42pt	48pt	60pt	72pt
line:	T.1356	T.1551	T.1741	T.2122	T.2324	T.2914	T.3470	T.4162	T.4716	T.5823	T.7100

254: Bodoni No. 2 (see also: 357 Bodoni No. 2) (cancelled in 1967)

display matrices: 4 sizes

size:	18pt	24pt	30pt	36pt
line:	T.1708	T.2276	T.2844	T.3404

288: Bodoni No. 1 (cancelled in 1967)

composition matrices: UA.364: 10D-12D-14D

size:	10D op 11pica	12D op 13pica	14D
set:	10.25	11.5	12.75
line:	M.1280	M.1323	M.1365

357: Bodoni No. 2 Roman/italic (see: 357 Bodoni Book)

composition matrices: UA.319: 8pt-12pt

size:	8pt (8D)	9pt (9D)	10pt (10D)	12pt (12D)
set:	8	9	9.75	11.5
line:	M.1277	M.1309	M.1315	M.1366

504: Bodoni No 5 Roman/italic (see: 504 Bodoni 357)

composition matrices: UA.319: 8pt-12pt

size:	8pt (8D)	9pt (9D)	10pt (10D)	12pt (12D)
set:	8	9	9.75	11.5
line:	M.1282	M.1314	M.1322	M.1372

195: Bodoni Bold Roman

composition matrices: UA.3: 6pt-12pt

size:	6pt (6D)	8pt (8D)	9pt (8D)	10pt (9D)	11pt (10D)	12pt (12D)
set:	6.5	7.75	8.5	9.5	10.25	11.75
line:	M.1164	M.1238	M.1260	M.1279	M.1302	M.1347

display matrices:

size:	14pt	18pt	24pt	30pt	36pt	42pt	48pt	60pt	72pt
line:	T.1356	T.1708	T.2276	T.2844	T.2914	T.4024	T.4578	T.5823	T.6962

260: Bodoni Bold Roman/italic, Vette variant for series 135

composition matrices: Roman UA.2 italic UA.143: 6pt-13pt; Roman UA.417, italic UA.143: 14pt
long descenders available and "large face" in 11pt

size:	6.5 (6D)	7pt (6D)	8pt (8D)	9pt (8D)	10pt (9D)	11pt (10D)	11pt (10D) "Large Face"	12pt (11D)	13pt (12D)	14pt (14D)
set:	6.5	7	7.75	8.5	9.5	10.25	11	11.75	12.75	13.5
line:	M.1164	M.1210	M.1238	M.1260	M.1279	M.1302	M.1315	M.1340	M.1372	M.1448

display matrices:

size:	14pt	16pt	18pt	22pt	24pt op 30pt	30pt	36pt	42pt	48pt	60pt	72pt
line:	T.1356	T.1551	T.1741	T.2122	T.2324	T.2914	T.3470	T.4162	T.4716	T.5823	T.7100

529: Bodoni Bold Condensed Roman/italic

display matrices:

size:	14pt	18pt	24pt	30pt	36pt	42pt	48pt	60pt	72pt
line:	T.1356	T.1741	T.2324	T.2824	T.3444	T.4046	T.4628	T.5820	T.6980

760: Bodoni Bold Titling Roman

display matrices:

size:	72pt
line:	T.8490

357: Bodoni Book Roman/italic

composition matrices: UA.319: 8pt-12pt

size:	8pt (8D)	9pt (9D)	10pt (10D)	11pt (11D)	12pt (12D)
set:	8	9	9.75	10.75	11.5
line:	M.1277	M.1309	M.1315	M.1345	M.1366

260: Bodoni Heavy Roman/italic (see: 260 Bodoni Bold)
529: Bodoni Heavy condensed Roman/italic (see: 529 Bodoni Bold condensed)
120: Bodoni ultra bold Roman/italic

display matrices:

size:	14pt	18pt	24pt	30pt	36	42pt	48pt	60pt	72pt
line:	T.1472	T.1876	T.2502	T.3094	T.3746	T.4436	T.5088	T.6380	T.7660

- Bold Face

_53: Bold Face (see: 53 Old Style Bold)
167: Bold Face (see: 167 De Vinne Italic)
366: Bold Face (see: 366 Inflex Bold)
245: Bold Face Italic No. 2 (see: 245 Old Style Bold Italic)
253: Bold Face No. 2 (see: 253 Old Style Bold)
138: Bold Face No. 3 Roman. (cancelled in 1965)

composition matrices: UA.3: 9pt

size: 9pt (9D) set: 8.75 line:M.1330

503: Bold Face (cancelled in 1965)
176: Bold Face Outline (see: 176 Old Style Bold Outline)
253: Bold Face Special Line (see: 253 Old Style Bold)
167: Bold Italic (see: 167 De Vinne Italic series No. 167)
334: Bold (The Times) (see: 334 Times Bold)
345: Bold (The Times) (see: 345 Times Bold)
360: Bold (The Times) (see: 360 Times Bold)

- Braggadocio

278: Braggadocio Roman

display matrices:

size:	18pt	24pt	36	48pt	72pt
line:	T.1015	T.2690	T.4024	T.5448	T.8180

- Breitkopf

466: Breitkopf romain (cancelled in 1936)

- Broadway

a306: Broadway (Sorts) (cancelled before 1966)
a307: Broadway Engraved (Sorts) (cancelled before 1966)

- Bruce Rogers

494: Bruce Rogers (cancelled in 1967)
594: Bruce Rogers Titling (in research)

- Bulmer

469: Bulmer Roman/italic

composition matrices: UA.412: 11pt-12pt

size:	11pt (10D)	12pt (12D)
set:	10	11.25
line:	M.1337	M.1345

==== C ====
- Calendar

L17: Calendar Figures Roman
L19: Calendar Days Roman

- Calisto
- Canterbury

197: Canterbury (cancelled in 1967)

composition matrices: UA.57 = 8-12pt

size:	6pt (6D)	8pt (8D)	10pt (9D)	12pt (12D)
set:	6.5	8	9.75	11.5
line:	M.1258	M.1302	M.1400	M.1450

display matrices:

size:	14pt	18pt	24pt	30pt	36pt
line:	T.1533	T.1948	T.2640	T.3194	T.3884

- Caslon

128: Caslon Roman/italic

composition matrices: UA.57 = 8-12pt

size:
8pt (8D)
9pt (8D)
10pt (9D)
11pt (10D)
12pt (11D)
13.5pt (14D) op 14pE

14pt Large Face (14D)

UA.
7
8
9
10
11
12
384
set:
8.25
8.75
9.75
11.25
12.25
13
line:
M.1210
M.1225
M.1270
M.1285
M.1324
M.1360
M.1474

large composition: 18pt - 24pt,

size:	18pt	20pt (20D)	24pt Small face (24D)	24pt
UA.Roman	104	160	105
UA.italic	153	167	167	152
set:	15.75	18	18	21.5
line:	T.1672	T.2088	T.2088	T.2364

display matrices:

size:	14pt	18pt	24pt	30pt (short desc.) op 24pica	30pt	36pt	42pt	48pt	60pt	72pt
line:	T.1395	T.1672	T.2364	T.2918	T.2918	T.3474	T.4166	T.4988	T.6120	T.7660

209: Caslon Titling Roman

display matrices:

size:	48pt	60pt	72pt
line:	T.4988	T.6120	T.7660

- Castellar
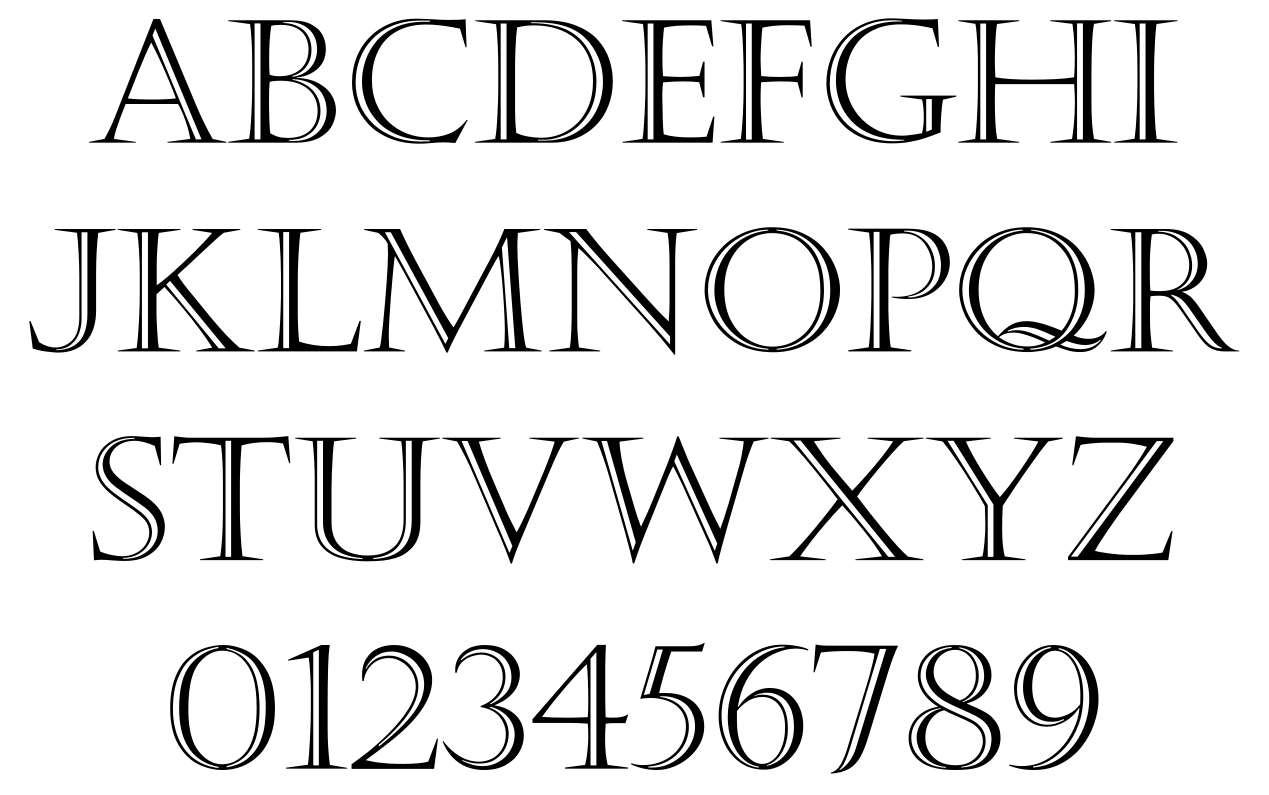

600: Castellar Roman
Title typeface drawn by John Peters in 1957 based on engraved Roman square capitals.

display matrices:

size:	24pt	30pt	36pt	48pt	60pt	72pt
line:	T.2986	T.3654	T.4474	T.6038	T.7590	T.9110

- Centaur

252: Centaur Roman/italic, also known under the name: Arrighi

composition matrices: UA.90 = 6-14pt, UA.322 = 14pt

size:	6pt (6D)	8pt (8D)	9pt (8D)	10pt (10D)	11pt (11D)	12pt (12D)	14pt (14D)
set:	6.5	8.25	8.75	9.25	10.25	11.25	12.5
line:	M.1202	M.1252	M.1256	M.1256	M.1286	M.1315	M.1418

large composition: 14pt - 24pt, UA.165 = Roman, UA.166 = italic

size:	14pt (14D)	16pt (16D)	18pt (18D)	22pt (22D)	24pt (24D)
set:	12.5	14	15.5	18.5	21
line:	T.1418	T.1493	T.1675	T.2024	T.2240

display matrices:

size:	14pt	16pt	18pt	24pt	30pt	36pt	42pt	48pt	60pt	72pt
line:	T.1306	T.1493	T.1675	T.2240	T.2744	T.3344	T.3926	T.4508	T.5640	T.6800

352: Centaur Roman/italic

large composition matrices only 18pt

size:	18pt (18D) Roman	18pt (18D) italic
UA.	389	166
set:	18.25	15.5
line:	T.1747	T.1747

295: Centaur Titling Roman

- Century

227: Century No. 2 Roman/italic (see: 227 Century Schoolbook)
211: Century No. 1 Roman (synonym: 211 Modern)

composition matrices UA.1 = 8pt

size:	8pt (8D)
set:	8.5
line:	M.1320

545: Century Bold (cancelled in 1967)
546: Century Bold Extended (cancelled in 1967)
227: Century Schoolbook Roman/italic

composition matrices: UA.369 = 6-14pt, UA.322 = 14pt

size:	6pt (6D)	7pt (7D)	8pt (8D)	9pt (9D)	10pt (10D)	11pt (11D)	12pt (12D)	14pt (14D)
set:	6.75	7.5	8.25	9.25	10	10.75	11.75	14
line:	M.1250	M.1280	M.1310	M.1346	M.1375	M.1405	M.1448	M.1655

large composition: 18pt - 20pt only Roman UA.370

size:	18pt (18D)	20pt (20D) (18pt long desc.)
set:	18	18
line:	T.2015	T.2015

477: Century Schoolbook Bold Roman

composition matrices: UA.498 = 6-14pt,

size:	6pt (6D)	7pt (7D)	8pt (8D)	9pt (9D)	10pt (10D)	11pt (11D)	12pt (12D)	14pt (14D)
set:	6.75	7.5	8.25	9.25	10	10.75	11.75	14
line:	M.1250	M.1280	M.1310	M.1346	M.1375	M.1405	M.1448	M.1655

650: Century Schoolbook Roman/italic

display matrices:

size:	14pt	18pt	24pt	30pt	36pt	42pt	48pt	60pt	72pt
line:	T.1549	T.1950	T.2559	T.3184	T.3874	T.4565	T.5257	T.6640	T.8020

651: Century Schoolbook Bold Roman

display matrices:

size:	14pt	18pt	24pt	30pt	36pt	42pt	48pt	60pt	72pt
line:	T.1549	T.1950	T.2559	T.3184	T.3874	T.4565	T.5257	T.6640	T.8020

- Century Gothic

display matrices:

size:	14pt	18pt	24pt	30pt	36pt
line:	T.1533	T.1948	T.2640	T.3194	T.3884

- Chatsworth

510: Chatsworth (cancelled in 1965)

At the request of Stephenson and Blake, Sheffield produced for them in one size.
composition matrices: UA.391 = 10pt,

size:	10pt (10D)
set:	12
line:	M.1425

- Chiswell Old Face

154: Chiswell Old face Roman/italic

display matrices:

size:	14pt	18pt	24pt	30pt	36pt
line:	T.1533	T.1948	T.2640	T.3194	T.3884

- Clarendon

_12: Clarendon Roman

composition matrices: UA.2 = 5-12pt,

size:	5pt (5D)	5.5pt (5D)	6pt (6D)	7pt (7D)	8pt (8D)	9pt (8D)	10pt (9D)	11pt (11D)	12pt (12D)
set:	5.5	6.5	6.5	7.25	8.25	9.25	9.75	10.75	12
line:	M.1200	M.1240	M.1258	M.1280	M.1305	M.1330	M.1320	M.1380	M.1385

412: Clarendon No. 2 (cancelled in 1967)

composition matrices: UA.2 = 5-12pt,

size:	8pt (8D)	9pt (8D)	11pt (11D)
set:	8.5	9.25	10.5
line:	M.1240	M.1265	M.1320

501: Clarendon Timetable (cancelled in 1967)

- Clearface Bold

157: Clearface Bold Roman/italic

composition matrices: UA.2 = 6-12pt,

size:	6pt (6D)	8pt (8D)	9pt (8D)	10pt (10D)	11pt (11D)	12pt (12D)
set:	6.75	8.25	9.25	10	10.75	11.75
line:	M.1220	M.1250	M.1250	M.1294	M.1320	M.1360

display matrices:

size:	14pt	18pt	24pt	30pt	36pt	42pt	48pt	60pt	72pt
line:	T.1533	T.1948	T.2640	T.3194	T.3884	T.4576	T.5268	T.6651	T.7930

- Cloister

271: Cloister Bold (cancelled in 1967)

composition matrices: UA.86 = 6-12pt,

size:	6pt (6D)	8pt (8D)	10pt (10D)	12pt (12D)
set:	6.75	8.25	9.75	10.75
line:	M.1245	M.1273	M.1285	M.1326

272: Cloister Old Style (cancelled in 1967)

composition matrices: UA.89 = 6-12pt,

size:	6pt (6D)	8pt (8D)	10pt (10D)	12pt (12D)
set:	6.5	7.75	8.5	10
line:	M.1236	M.1275	M.1269	M.1316

a395: Cloister Old Style (Sorts) (cancelled before 1966)

- Cochin

165: Cochin Roman/italic

composition matrices: UA.67 = 6D-13pt, UA.174 = 14pt Roman, UA.173 = 14pt italic

size:	6D (6D)	8pt (8D)	10pt (9D)	11pt (10D)	12pt (11D)	13pt (12D)	14pt (14D)
set:	7.5	8.5	10.5	11.5	12.25	13.25	15
line:	M.1239	M.1254	M.1293	M.1320	M.1360	M.1387	M.1440

display matrices:

size:	14pt	18pt	24pt	30pt	36pt
line:	T.1440	T.1841	T.2480	T.3056	T.3726

225: Colonna Roman

display matrices:

size:	18pt	24pt	36pt
line:	T.1585	T.2114	T.3154

- Condensa

511: Condensa italic

display matrices:

size:	18pt	24pt	30pt
line:	T.1948	T.2640	T.3194

- Condensed

213: Condensed Bold (see: 213 Bernard Condensed)
224; Condensed Heavy Antique (see: 224 Devonshire Bold Condensed)
383: Condensed Heavy Grotesque (see: 383 Grotesque Condensed)
523: Condensed Heavy Grotesque Titling (see: 523 Grotesque Condensed)
419: Condensed Latin (see: 419 Grotesque Condensed Titling)

- Crossword

306: Crossword Puzzle Solutions

composition matrices: 11pt
11pt: 28 matrices, ABCDEFGHIJKLMNOPQRSTUVWXYZ + empty field + shaded area, the matrices were cast on squares, with a flat wedge.

306: Crossword Puzzle Specials

18pt: S 2612 t/m S 2641 = 1 t/m 30, S2727 t/m S2746 = 31-50, S3976 t/m S3986 = 51-61, S2643 = leeg veld, S2611 = gearceerd veld
309: Crossword Squares (cancelled)

- Cushing

_17: Cushing (cancelled in 1967)

composition matrices UA.1 = 6pt - 13pt

size:	6D (6D)	7pt (7D)	8pt (8D)	9pt (8D)	10pt (9D)	11pt (10D)	12pt (11 of 12DD)	13pt (12D)
set:	6.5	7.25	8	8.75	9.25	10.25	12	12.5
line:	M.1235	M.1220	M.1245	M.1265	M.1290	M.1323	M.1380	M.1395

- Curlz

==== D ====
- Daily Mail Modern

326: Daily Mail Modern (cancelled in 1974)

- Dante

This font was the last design of Giovanni Mardersteig. Charles Malin, the engraver producing the punches for Mardesteig died in 1955. After this event Mardersteig did not want any more new designs. In his opinion punches made with a pantograph were inferior. The character was later adapted for composition casters by Monotype and released in 1957.

592: Dante Roman/italic

composition matrices: UA.441, 6D-14D

size:	6D at 7pE	7D at 8pE	8D at 9pE	9D at 10pE	10D at 11pE	11D at 12pE	12D at 13pE	13D at 14pE	14D at 16pE
set:	6	7	7.5	8.25	8.75	9.75	10.75	11.5	12.75
line:	M.1200	M.1245	M.1290	M.1322	M.1382	M.1533

display matrices

size:	18D at 20pE	24D at 30pE	36D at 36pE	48D at 60pE
line:	T.1841	T.2462	T.3684	T.4960

682: Dante Semi Bold Roman/italic

composition matrices: UA.504, 6D-14D

size:	6D at 7pE	7D at 8pE	8D at 9pE	9D at 10pE	10D at 11pE	11D at 12pE	12D at 13pE	14D at 16pE
set:	6	7	7.5	8.25	8.75	9.75	10.75	12.75
line:	M.1200	M.1245	M.1290	M.1322	M.1354	M.1533

612: Dante Titling Roman

display matrices

size:	16D at 18pE	20D at 22pE	28D at 30pE	36D at 36pE
line:	T.1677	T.2085	T.2952	T.3764

- Deutsch Romisch

298: Deutsch Romisch (cancelled in 1970)

composition matrices: UA.303, 6D-12D

size:	6D at 7pE	8D at 9pE	9D at 10pE	10D at 11pE	12D at 13pE
set:	6.75	8	9	10	12
line:	M.1243	M.1350	M.1480

286: Deutsch Romisch Bold (cancelled in 1967)

composition matrices: UA.304, 8D-10D

size:	8D at 9pE	10D at 11pE
set:	8	10
line:	M.1390

- De Vinne

131: De Vinne (cancelled in 1967

composition matrices: UA.400, 8pt

size:	8pt (8D)	12D op 13pE
set:	8	12.25
line:	M.1445

display matrices

size:	14pt	18pt	24pt	30pt	36pt
line:	T.1533	T.1938	T.2640	T.3194	T.3884

_21: De Vinne (see: De Vinne Condensed)
_21: De Vinne Condensed (cancelled in 1967)

composition matrices: UA.2 6.5pt - 12 pt

size:	6pt (6D)	8pt (8D)	10pt (9D)	12pt (12D)
set:	6.5	8	9.25	11.25
line:	M.1230	M.1280	M.1360	M.1435

167: De Vinne Italic (synonym: Bold Italic Series No. 167) (cancelled in 1967)

composition matrices: UA.3 7.5pt - 11 pt

size:	7.5pt (7D)	8pt (8D)	9pt (8D	10pt (9D)	11pt (10D)
set:	8	8	8.75	9.75	10.5
line:	M.1250	M.1250	M.1280	M.1294	M.1320

- Devonshire

223: Devonshire Bold (synonym: 223 Heavy Antique (cancelled in 1967)

display matrices

size:	42pt	48pt
line:	T.4576	T.5268

224: Devonshire Bold Condensed (synonym: 224 Condensed Heavy Antique) (cancelled in 1967)

display matrices

size:	42pt	48pt
line:	T.4576	T.5268

- Didot

_71: Didot Roman/italic

composition matrices: UA.1 6.5pt - 13pt

size:	6.5pt (6D)	7.5pt (7D)	9pt (8D	10pt (9D)	11pt (10D)	11pt Large face (10D)	12pt (11D	13pt (12D)
set:	7,25	7.5	8.75	9.5	10.25	11	11.75	12.5
line:	M.1225	M.1240	M.1260	M.1290	M.1320	M.1335	M.1360	M.1390

- Divina Comedia

425: Divina Comedia (destroyed in a bombardment)

- Dorchester Script

436 Dorcherster script

display matrices

size:	14pt	18pt	24pt	36pt
line:	T.1218	T.1565	T.2088	T.3114

==== E ====
- Egyptian

107: Egyptian No. 1 Roman

composition matrices: UA.2 = 6-12pt

size:	6pt (6D)	7pt (7D)	8pt (8D)	9pt (9D)	10pt (10D)	11pt (11D)	12pt (12D)
set:	6.5	7.25	7.5	8	8.75	10.5	12
line:	M.1220	M.1220	M.1250	M.1266	M.1291	M.1315	M.1356

171: Egyptian (synonym: 171 Egyptian Bold) (cancelled in 1967)

composition matrices: UA.39 = 9pt

size:	9pt
set:	8.5
line:	M.1266

173: Egyptian No. 4 Roman

display matrices:

size:	14pt	18pt	24pt	30pt	36pt
line:	T.1533	T.1948	T.2640	T.3194	T.3884

129: Egyptian Roman (see: Egyptian Bold nr.1 en: 251)
130: Egyptian (cancelled in 1967)

composition matrices: UA.3 = 8pt

size:	8pt
set:	8
line:	M.1285

162: Egyptian No. 3 (cancelled in 1967)

composition matrices: UA.3 = 8pt

size:	6.5pt
set:	6.5
line:	M.1210

184: Egyptian (see: 184 Ionic No. 3)
241: Egyptian
251: Egyptian (see: Egyptian Condensed)
330: Egyptian (see: Egyptian Bold)
129: Egyptian Bold No. 1 Roman (see: 251)

composition matrices: UA.3 = 8-10pt

size:	8pt (8D)	9pt (9D)	10pt (10D)
set:	8.5	9.25	10
line:	M.1235	M.1257	M.1290

171: Egyptian Bold (see: 171 Egyptian) (cancelled in 1967)
330: Egyptian Bold (synonym: 330 Egyptian) (cancelled in 1967)

composition matrices: UA.3 = 6D

size:	6D (6D)
set:	8
line:	M.1285

282: Egyptian Bold Condensed Roman (see: 251) (synonyms: Egyptian Heavy and Heavy Egyptian

composition matrices: UA.313 = 6D

size:	6D
set:	6.5
line:	M.1230

251: Egyptian Condensed Roman

composition matrices: UA.63 = 6.5pt

size:	6.5pt (6D)
set:	6.5
line:	M.1230

112: Egyptian Condensed (cancelled in 1967)

composition matrices: UA.2 = 9pt

size:	9
set:	8.5
line:	M.1270

464: Egyptian Condensed (cancelled in 1967)

composition matrices: UA.130 = 6D-10D

size:	6D op 7pE	7D op 8pE	8D op 9pE	9D op 10pE	10D op 11pE
set:	6.75	7.75	8.5	9.5	10.75
line:	M.1206	M.1246	M.1278	M.1301	M.1335

_72: Egyptian Extended Roman

composition matrices: UA.3 = 5-13pt

size:	5pt (5D)	5.5pt (5D)	6pt (6D)	6.5pt (6D)	7.5pt (7D)	9pt (8D)	10pt (9D)	11pt (10D)	12pt (11D)	13pt (12D)
set:	5.5	7.25	7.25	7.75	8.5	9.75	10	11	12.25	13
line:	M.1173	M.1220	M.1220	M.1225	M.1240	M.1260	M.1290	M.1320	M.1360	M.1390

465: Egyptian Extended (bij bombardement vernietigd)
282: Egyptian Heavy Roman (see: 282 Egyptian Bold Condensed)

- Ehrhardt

453: Ehrhardt Roman/italic

composition matrices: UA.397 = 6-14pt

size:	6pt (6D)	7pt (7D)	8pt (8D)	9pt (9D)	11pt (11D)	12pt (12D)	14pt (14D)
set:	6.25	7.25	7.75	8.5	9.25	10	11	12.75
line:	M.1220	M.1255	M.1270	M.1300	M.1320	M.1346	M.1381	M.1520

display matrices:

size:	18pt	24pt	30pt	36pt
line:	T.1810	T.2424	T.2987	T.3608

563: Ehrhardt (cancelled in 1974)
573: Ehrhardt Semi-Bold Roman/italic

composition matrices: UA.430 = 6-14pt

size:	6pt (6D)	7pt (7D)	8pt (8D)	9pt (9D)	10pt (10D)	11pt (11D)	12pt (12D)	14pt (14D)
set:	6.25	7.25	7.75	8.5	9.25	10	11	12.75
line:	M.1220	M.1255	M.1270	M.1300	M.1320	M.1346	M.1381	M.1520

display matrices:

size:	18pt	24pt	30pt	36pt
line:	T.1810	T.2424	T.2987	T.3608

- Ellington
- Elite Typewriter

235: Elite Typewriter (see: Typewriter)

composition matrices: UA.28 = 12pt

size:	12pt (11D of 12D)
set:	13.25
line:	M.1302

- Elsevir

_19: Elsevir Roman/italic

UA.1 6pt - 12 pt

size:	6pt (6D)	7pt (7D)	8pt (8D)	9pt (8D)	10pt (9D)	11pt (10D)	12pt
set:	6.5	7.25	8	8.75	9.5	10.25	12
line:	M.1210	M.1242	M.1270	M.1290	M.1340	M.1360	M.1415

- Electronic Reading Founts

E-13B
CMC7
407-1
OCR-B

- Emerson

320: Emerson Roman/italic

composition matrices: UA.390 = 8-14pt

size:	8pt (8D)	10pt (10D)	11pt (11D)	12pt (12D)	14pt (14D)
set:	7.5	8.75	9.5	10.25	12.25
line:	M.1210	M.1252	M.1270	M.1299	M.1421

display matrices:

size:	18pt	24pt
line:	T.1693	T.2260

400: Emerson (cancelled in 1967)
479: Emerson (destroyed in a bombardment)

- Emery

452: Emery (cancelled in 1965)

- Engravers Titling

146: Engraver's Titling (see: 146 Engravers' Titling)
146: Engravers' Titling Roman

composition matrices: UA.18 = 6pt, capitals in 4 sizes, that can be combined.

size:	6pt (6D)
set:	8
line:	M.1282

147: Engravers' Titling (see: Engravers' Bold Titling)
147: Engravers' Titling Bold (see: Engravers' Bold Titling)

- Engravers Bold titling

147: Engravers Bold Titling Roman

composition matrices: UA.18 = 6 and 12pt in 4 sizes that can be combined.

size:	6pt (6D)	12pt (12D)
set:	8	14.5
line:	M.1282	M.1420

display matrices: 24 pt in 5 sizes

size:	24pt
line:	T.3060

==== F ====
- Fabritius

586: Fabritius Roman

- Falstaff

323: Falstaff Roman/italic

composition matrices: UA.347 = 6D-12D

size:	6D at 7pE	7D at 8pE	8D at 9pE	9D at 10pE	10D at 11pE	12D at 13pE
set:	10.25	12	13.75	15.5	17	20.5
line:	M.1245	M.1288	M.1330	M.1373	M.1415	M.1503

display matrices:

size:	14D at 16pE	16D at 18pE	18D at 20pE	20D at 22pE	24D at 30pE	30D at 36pE	36D at 36pE	42D at 48pE
line:	T.1616	T.1838	T.2060	T.2282	T.2756	T.3465	T.4134	T.4849

- Felix Titling

399: Felix Titling Roman

display matrices:

size:	72pt
line:	T.7400

- Fanfare Bold

514: Fanfare Bold Condensed Italic Titling italic (destroyed in a bombardment)
516: Fanfare Bold Condensed Italic Titling No. 2 italic

- Festival Titling

554: Festival Titling italic

display matrices:

size:	36pt	42pt	48pt	60pt	72pt
line:	T.4576	T.5406	T.6098	T.7619	T.9175

- Figaro

536: Figaro Roman

display matrices:

size:	24pt	30pt	36pt	48pt
line:	T.2680	T.3294	T.4014	T.5418

626: Figaro Bold (cancelled in 1967)

^ Fleet Titling

632: Fleet Titling Roman

display matrices:

size:	14pt	16pt	18pt	24pt	30pt	36pt	42pt	48pt	60pt	72pt
line:	T.1622	T.1855	T.2080	T.2780	T.3414	T.4164	T.4906	T.5618	T.7050	T.8470

- Floriated capitals

431: Floriated capitals

display matrices:

size:	48pt
line:	T.6488

- Fontana

403: Fontana Roman/italic

composition matrices: UA.464 = 8pt-14pt

size:	8pt (8D)	10pt (10D)	11pt (11D)	12pt (12D)	14pt (14D)
set:	7.5	9.25	10	11	12.5
line:	M.1233	M.1295	M.1320	M.1352	M.1481

large composition matrices:

size:	18pt Roman	18pt italic	24pt Roman
UA.	488	464	488
set:	16	16	21.5
line:	T.1810	T.1810	T.2364

437: Fontana bible face Roman/italic

composition matrices: UA.464 = 4.5pt-6pt

size:	4.5pt (4D)	5pt (5D)	6pt (6D)	6pt long desc. & asc.on 8pE
set:	5.25	6.25	7.25	7.25
line:	M.1231	M.1271	M.1300	M.1300

443: Fontana Titling (destroyed in a bombardment)

- Forte

614: Forte

display matrices:

size:	18D at 20pE	24D at 30pE	36D at 36pE	48D at 60pE	60D at 72pE	72pt
line:	T.1984	T.2654	T.3974	T.5360	T.6710	T.7530

- Fournier

185: Fournier Roman/italic

composition matrices: UA.59 = 8pt-13.5pt

size:	8pt (8D)	9pt (8D)	10pt (9D)	11pt (10D)	12pt (11D)	13.5pt op 14pE (14D)
set:	7.25	8.25	8.75	9.25	10.25	11.75
line:	M.1256	M.1280	M.1294	M.1315	M.1345	M.1397

large composition matrices: UA. 446

size:	14pt (14D)
set:	12.25
line:	T.1385

185: Fournier Old Face (see: Fournier)
285: Fournier Old Face (Shortened Caps) (see: Fournier Shortened Capitals)
285: Fournier Shortened Capitals Roman/italic (see also: Fournier 185)

composition matrices: UA.59 = 10pt-13.5pt, abridged capitals, for use in conjunction with the lowercase characters of Fournier 185

size:	10pt (9D)	11pt (10D)	12pt (11D)	13.5pt op 14pE (14D)
set:	8.75	9.25	10.25	11.75
line:	M.1294	M.1315	M.1345	M.1397

- French Face Extended

_76: French Face Extended (cancelled in 1967)

composition matrices: UA.1 = 7D-10pt

size:	7D at 8pE	9pt (8D)	10pt (9D)
set:	8.25	9.75	10.75
line:	M.1250	M.1257	M.1301

- French Modern

111: French Modern (cancelled in 1967)

composition matrices: UA.1 = 6D-10pt

size:	6D op 7pE	7D op 8pE	9pt (8D)	10pt (9D)
set:	7	8.25	8.5	9
line:	M.1215	M.1250	M.1270	M.1290

- French Old Style

_68: French Old Style Roman/italic

composition matrices: UA.1 = 6.5pt-13pt
oid specimen blades show size 7pt and 8pt, later versions: 6.5pt and 7.5pt, set and lining stay the same.

size:	6.5pt at 7pE (6D)	7pt	7.5pt (7D) at 8pE	9pt (8D)	10pt (9D)	11pt (10D)	13pt (12D)
set:	7.25	7.25	7.5	7.5	8.25	9.75	10.75
line:	M.1215	M.1215	M.1253	M.1253	M.1260	M.1290	M.1320	M.1388

109: French Old Style Roman/italic (synonym: French Old Stype no. 2) (cancelled in 1967)

composition matrices: UA.1 = 6.5pt-11pt

size:	6.5pt (6D) op 7pE	7.5pt (7D) op 8pE	9pt (8D)	10pt (9D)	11pt (10D)
set:	6.5	7.5	8.25	9.5	10.25
line:	M.1220	M.1250	M.1260	M.1291	M.1315

148: French Old Style No. 3 (cancelled in 1967

composition matrices: UA.1 = 6.5pt

size:	6.5pt (6D) op 7pE
set:	6.5
line:	M.1215

_69: French Old Style Bold Roman/italic

composition matrices: UA.1 = 7pt-13pt

size:	7pt (6D)	8pt (7D)	9pt (8D)	10pt (9D)	11pt (10D)	13pt (12D)
set:	7.5	7.5	8.75	9.5	10.25	12.25
line:	M.1215	M.1253	M.1260	M.1290	M.1320	M.1388

_69: French Old Style (Half-Fat) (see: French Old Style Bold)

- French Round Face

_44: French Round Face Roman/italic

composition matrices: UA.1 = 6.5pt-13pt

size:	6.5pt (6D) at 7pE	7.5pt (7D) at 8pE	9pt (8D)	10pt (9D)	11pt (10D)	12pt (12D)	13pt (12D)
set:	7.75	8.5	9.75	10	11	12.25	13
line:	M.1225	M.1243	M.1280	M.1300	M.1327	M.1360	M.1387

- Fredericus Antiqus

314: Fredericus Antiqus Roman/italic

composition matrices: UA.1 = 6.5pt-13pt

size:	6D at 7pE	7D at 8pE	10D at 11pE	12D at 13pE
set:	8	8.5	9	11	12.5
line:	M.1236	M.1268	M.1295	M.1333	M.1380

- Futura Buchschrift

596: Futura Buchschrift (cancelled in 1960)

==== G ====
- Gallia (Sorts)

a313: Gallia (Sorts) (cancelled voor 1966)

- Garamond

156: Garamond Roman/italic

Swash and ligatures for 156
The italic which was designed for this series was found by customers to be much too extreme. Eventually it was decided to design a more modest italic. That was: ' Series 174 '. The extra luxury italic "swash"-capitals continued to be maintained. In old die cases the italic matrices with 156 appearing on them are occasionally to be found, and they are quite popular for present users of Monotype machines.
composition matrices: UA.37 = 6-12pt, UA.99 = 14pt

size:	6pt (6D)	6.5pt (6D)	7pt (7D)	8pt (8D)	9pt (8D)	10pt (10D)	11pt (10D)	12pt (11D)	12D	14pt (14D)
set:	6	6.75	7	8	8.75	9.5	10.25	11.25	12.25	12.25
line:	M.1186	M.1200	M.1220	M.1250	M.1268	M.1276	M.1300	M.1338	M.1368	M.1486

large composition: Roman = UA.114 italic = UA.115

14pt (14D) Roman/italic, 16pt (16D) Roman, 18pt (18D) Roman/italic, 24pt (24D) Roman/italic

size:	14pt (14D)	16pt (16D)	18pt (18D)	24pt (24D)
set:	12.75	14	16	21.5
line:	T.1395	T.1600	T.1810	T.2364

display matrices:

size:	14pt	16pt	18pt	22pt	24pt	30pt	36pt	42pt	48pt	60pt	72pt
line:	T.1395	T.1600	T.1810	T.2138	T.2364	T.2918	T.3470	T.4166	T.4778	T.5961	T.7240

201: Garamond bold Roman/italic

composition matrices: 6-12pt: Roman = UA.61, italic = UA.315, 14pt = UA.342

size:	6pt (6D)	6.5pt (6D)	7pt (7D)	8pt (8D)	9pt (8D)	10pt (10D)	11pt (10D)	12pt (11D)	12D	14pt (14D)
set:	6	6.75	7	8	8.75	9.5	10.25	11.25	12.25	14
line:	M.1186	M.1200	M.1223	M.1254	M.1268	M.1285	M.1311	M.1350	M.1380	M.1500

large composition: UA.154

18pt (18D) Roman/italic, 24pt (24D) Roman/italic

size:	18pt (18D)	24pt (24D)
set:	18	24
line:	T.1810	T.2364

display matrices:

size:	14pt	16pt	18pt	22pt	24pt	30pt	36pt	42pt	48pt	60pt	72pt
line:	T.1395	T.1600	T.1810	T.2138	T.2364	T.2918	T.3608	T.4162	T.4854	T.5961	T.7240

174: Garamond Italic No. 2 italic (the Roman was cancelled before 1966)

composition matrices: UA.42 = 6-12pt, UA.140 = 14pt

size:	6pt (6D)	6.5pt (6D)	7pt (7D)	8pt (8D)	9pt (8D)	10pt (10D)	11pt (10D)	12pt (11D)	12D	14pt (14D)
set:	6	6.75	7	8	8.75	9.5	10.25	11.25	12.25	12.75
line:	M.1186	M.1200	M.1220	M.1250	M.1268	M.1276	M.1300	M.1338	M.1368	M.1486

large composition: UA.140

14pt (14D) Roman/italic, 18pt (18D) Roman/italic, 24pt (24D) Roman/italic

size:	14pt (14D)	18pt (18D)	24pt (24D)
set:	12.75	16	21.5
line:	T.1395	T.1810	T.2364

display matrices:

size:	14pt	16pt	18pt	22pt	24pt	30pt	36pt	42pt	48pt	60pt	72pt
line:	T.1395	T.1600	T.1810	T.2138	T.2364	T.2918	T.3470	T.4166	T.4778	T.5961	T.7240

201: Garamond Heavy (see: 201 Garamond Bold)
Am. 548: Garamond Bold
Am. 5481: Garamond Bold Italic
Am. 648E: American Garamond (Roman)
Am. 649G: American Garamond Italic

- Garamont (Goudy)

Am. 248: Garamont (Goudy) Roman
Am. 2481: Garamont Italic (Goudy) italic

- Gill

275: Gill Bold Sans-serif (see: 275 Gill Sans Bold)
430: Gill Face (destroyed in a bombardment)
442: Gill Ultra Bold (see: 442 Gill Sans Ultra Bold)
433: Gill Moiree Shadow (destroyed in a bombardment)

- Gill Sans

262: Gill Sans Roman/italic

composition matrices: Roman: UA.82, italic: UA.311 = 5-14pt (S.H. = short descenders)

size:	5pt (5D)	5.5pt at 6pE (6pt S.H.) (5D)	6pt (6D)	6D at 7pE	7pt (7D)	8pt (8D)	8D at 9pE (9pt S.H.)	9pt (8D)	9D at 10pE (10pt S.H.)	10pt (10D)	10D at 11pE (11pt S.H.)	11pt (11D)	12pt (11D)	14pt (14D)
set:	6	6.5	6.5	7	7.5	8	9	9	9.5	9.5	10.25	10.25	11.25	12.5
line:	M.1198	M.1220	M.1220	M.1235	M.1255	M.1255	M.1285	M.1285	M.1302	M.1302	M.1327	M.1327	M.1360	M.1415

large composition: UA.383, Roman 18pt

size:	18pt (18D)
set:	17
line:	T.1841

display matrices:

size:	14pt	16pt	18pt	20pt	22pt	24pt	30pt	36pt	42pt	48pt	60pt	72pt
line:	T.1395	T.1611	T.1841	T.2002	T.2181	T.2480	T.2918	T.3606	T.4162	T.4844	T.6124	T.7270

349: Gill Sans No. 2 Roman/italic

composition matrices: Roman: UA.345 = 5pt

size:	5pt (5D)
set:	5
line:	M.1155

275: Gill Sans Bold Roman/italic

composition matrices: Roman: UA.93 = 5-14pt, italic: UA.302 = 5.5-14pt (S.H. = short descenders)

size:	5pt (5D)	5.5pt at 6pE (6pt S.H.) (5D)	6pt (6D)	6D at 7pE	7pt (7D)	8pt (8D)	8D at 9pE (9pt S.H.)	9pt (9D)	9D at 10pE (10pt S.H.)	10pt (10D)	10D at 11pE (11pt S.H.)	11pt (11D)	12pt (11D)	14pt (14D)
set:	6	6.5	6.5	7	7.5	8	9	9	9.5	9.5	10.25	10.25	11.25	12.5
line:	M.1198	M.1220	M.1220	M.1235	M.1255	M.1255	M.1285	M.1285	M.1302	M.1302	M.1327	M.1327	M.1360	M.1415

large composition: UA.383, Roman 18pt

size:	18pt (18D)
set:	18
line:	T.1841

display matrices:

size:	14pt	16pt	18pt	20pt	22pt	24pt	30pt	36pt	42pt	48pt	60pt	72pt
line:	T.1395	T.1611	T.1841	T.2002	T.2181	T.2480	T.2918	T.3606	T.4162	T.4844	T.6124	T.7270

350: Gill Sans Bold Roman (see: 350 Gill Sans 349)

composition matrices: Roman: UA.346 = 5pt

size:	5pt (5D)
set:	5
line:	M.1155

575: Gill Sans Bold (cancelled in 1967)
343: Gill Sans Bold Condensed Roman

composition matrices: Roman: UA.93 = 5-14pt, italic: UA.302 = 5.5-14pt (S.H. = short descenders)

size:	5.5pt at 6pE (6pt S.H.) (5D)	6pt (6D)	8pt (8D)	9pt (9D)	10pt (10D)	12pt (12D)	14pt (14D)
set:	6.5	6.5	8	9	9.5	11.25	12.5
line:	M.1220	M.1220	M.1255	M.1285	M.1302	M.1360	M.1415

display matrices:

size:	14pt	16pt	18pt	24pt	30pt	36pt	42pt	48pt	60pt	72pt
line:	T.1395	T.1611	T.1841	T.2480	T.2918	T.3606	T.4162	T.4844	T.6124	T.7270

373: Gill Sans Bold Condensed Titling No. 1 Roman

display matrices:

size:	14pt	18pt	24pt	30pt	36pt	48pt	60pt	72pt
line:	T.1181	T.2363	T.3193	T.3886	T.4714	T.6418	T.8070	T.9680

525: Gill Sans Bold Condensed Titling Roman

display matrices:

size:	72pt
line:	T.9700

468: Gill Sans Bold Extra Condensed Eoman

display matrices:

size:	14pt	18pt	24pt	30pt	36pt	48pt	60pt	72pt
line:	T.1637	T.2086	T.2805	T.3470	T.4160	T.5684	T.7150	T.8552

_L8: Gill Sans Bold Timetable Roman
317: Gill Sans Bold Titling Roman

display matrices:

size:	24pt	30pt	36pt	48pt	60pt	72pt
line:	T.3160	T.3886	T.4744	T.6398	T.8050	T.9660

233: Gill Sans Cameo Roman

display matrices:

size:	24pt	30pt	36pt	48pt
line:	T.2890	T.4344	T.5096	T.5828

299: Gill Sans Cameo Ruled Roman

display matrices:

size:	36pt	48pt
line:	T.4914	T.6528

485: Gill Sans Condensed Roman

composition matrices: Roman: UA.499 = 10-12pt

size:	10pt (10D)	12pt (12D)
set:	8.75	10.25
line:	M.1302	M.1360

display matrices:

size:	14pt	18pt	24pt	30pt	36pt
line:	T.1395	T.1841	T.2480	T.2918	T.3606

321: Gill Sans Extra Bold Roman

composition matrices: UA.336 = 6D-12pt

size:	6D op 7pE	7D op 8pE	8pt (8D)	10pt (10D)	12pt (12D)
set:	7	8	8	9.5	11.25
line:	M.1235	M.1270	M.1255	M.1302	M.1360

display matrices:

size:	14pt	16pt	18pt	22pt	24pt	30pt	36pt	42pt	48pt	60pt	72pt	72D op 72pE
line:	T.1395	T.1581	T.1841	T.2181	T.2480	T.2918	T.3608	T.4162	T.4844	T.6124	T.7270	T.8060

526: Gill Sans Extra Bold Titling Roman

display matrices:

size:	72pt
line:	T.9700

526: Gill Sans Extra Heavy Titling (see: 526 Gill Sans Extra Bold Titling)
362: Gill Sans Light Roman/italic

composition matrices: Roman: UA.82 = 4.5-14pt, italic: UA.311 = 5-14pt

size:	4.5	5pt	5.5pt at 6pE	6pt	6D at 7pE	7pt	8pt	8D at 9pE	9pt	9D at 10pE	10pt	10D at 11pE	11pt	12pt	14pt
didot:	4D	5D	5D	6D	6D	7D	8D	8D	9D	9D	10D	10D	11D	12D	14D
set:	5.5	6	6.5	6.5	7	7.5	8	9	9	9.5	9.5	10.25	10.25	11.25	12.5
line:	M.1239	M.1198	M.1220	M.1220	M.1235	M.1255	M.1255	M.1285	M.1285	M.1302	M.1302	M.1327	M.1327	M.1360	M.1415

display matrices:

size:	14pt	16pt	18pt	20pt	22pt	24pt	30pt	36pt	42pt	48pt	60pt	72pt
line:	T.1395	T.1611	T.1841	T.2002	T.2181	T.2480	T.2918	T.3606	T.4162	T.4844	T.6124	T.7270

662: Gill Sans Light No. 2 Roman (synonym: Gill Sans Light, see also: Gill Sans 349)

composition matrices: Roman: UA.345 = 5pt

size:	5pt (5D)
set:	5
line:	M.1155

353: Gill Sans Poster Roman

display matrices:

size:	66pt op 72pE	72pt
line:	T.6683	T.8030

406: Gill Sans Shadow No. 1 Roman

display matrices:

size:	18pt	24pt	30pt	36pt	42	48pt	60pt	72pt
line:	T.2363	T.3160	T.3894	T.4744	T.5596	T.6408	T.8050	T.9660

408: Gill Sans Shadow No. 2 Roman

display matrices:

size:	42
line:	T.6648

338: Gill Sans Shadow No. 3 Roman

display matrices:

size:	72
line:	T.7950

290: Gill Sans Shadow Line Roman

display matrices:

size:	14pt	18pt	24pt	30pt	36pt	42	48pt	60pt	72pt
line:	T.1395	T.1840	T.2480	T.2918	T.3608	T.4161	T.4854	T.6124	T.7270

304: Gill Sans Shadow Titling Roman

display matrices:

size:	18pt	24pt	30pt	36pt	48pt
line:	T.2363	T.3162	T.3884	T.4744	T.6372

231: Gill Sans Titling Roman

composition matrices: UA.84 = 6pt in 4 sizes, 12pt

size:	6pt size 4	6pt size 3	6pt size 1	6pt sizes 3 and 4	6pt sizes 1 and 3	12pt
didot	6D	6D	6D	6D	6D	12D
set:	7.75	7.75	7.75	7.75	7.75	16
line:	M.1365	M.1365	M.1365	M.1365	M.1365	M.1750

display matrices:

size:	14pt	18pt	24pt	30pt	36pt	42pt	48pt	60pt	72pt
line:	T.1846	T.2367	T.3162	T.3884	T.4744	T.5562	T.6372	T.8034	T.9700

262: Gill Sans-Serif (see: 262 Gill Sans)
349: Gill Sans-Serif (see: 349 Gill Sans)
353: Gill Sans-Serif (see: 353 Gill Sans Poster)
275: Gill Sans-Serif Bold (see: 275 Gill Sans Bold)
350: Gill Sans-Serif Bold (see: 350 Gill Sans Bold)
343: Gill Sans-Serif Bold Condensed (see: 343 Gill Sans Bold Condensed)
468: Gill Sans-Serif Bold Extra Condensed (see: 465 Gill Sans Bold Extra Condensed)
233: Gill Sans-Serif Cameo (see: 233 Gill Sans Cameo)
299: Gill Sans-Serif Cameo Ruled (see: 299 Gill Sans Cameo Ruled)
373: Gill Sans-Serif Extra Bold Titling (see: 373 Gill Sans Bold Condensed Titling)
321: Gill Sans-Serif Extra Heavy (see: 321 Gill Sans Extra Bold)
485: Gill Sans-Serif Medium Condensed (see: 485 Gill Sans Condensed)
362: Gill Sans-Serif Light (see: 362 Gill Sans Light)
304: Gill Sans-Serif Shadow (see: 304 Gill Sans Shadow Titling)
406: Gill Sans-Serif Shadow No. 1 (see: 406 Gill Sans Shadow No. 1)
408: Gill Sans-Serif Shadow No. 2 (see: 408 Gill Sans Shadow No. 2)
290: Gill Sans-Serif Shadowline (see: 290 Gill Sans Shadow Line)
231: Gill Sans-Serif Titling (see: 231 Gill Sans Titling)
317: Gill Sans-Serif Titling (see: 317 Gill Sans Bold Titling)
338: Gill Sans-Serif Two Colour (see: 338 Gill Sans Shadow No. 3)
442: Gill Sans-Serif Ultra Bold (see: 442 Gill Sans Ultra Bold)
442: Gill Sans Ultra Bold Roman

display matrices:

size:	18pt	24pt	36pt	48pt	60pt	72pt
line:	T.1985	T.2640	T.3974	T.5398	T.6720	T.8060

Alternative characters for 262, 275, 362

- Gloucester

103: Gloucester Bold Roman/italic

composition matrices: UA.5 = 6-13.5pt,

size:	6pt (6D)	7.5pt (7D)	8pt (8D)	9pt (8D)	10pt (9D)	11pt (10D)	11.5pt (11D)	12pt (11D)	13.5pt (13D)
set:	6	7.25	7.25	8	9	9.75	10.5	11.25	12.75
line:	M.1276	M.1323	M.1323	M.1352	M.1400	M.1433	M.1467	M.1500	M.1563

display matrices:

size:	14pt	18pt	24pt	30pt	36pt	42pt	48pt	60pt	72pt
line:	T.1533	T.1948	T.2640	T.3194	T.3884	T.4576	T.5268	T.6651	T.7930

198: Gloucester Bold Condensed Roman

composition matrices: UA.60 = 6-12pt,

size:	6pt (6D)	8pt (8D)	10pt (9D)	11pt (10D)	12pt (11D)
set:	6	7.25	8.5	9.25	9.75
line:	M.1276	M.1323	M.1400	M.1433	M.1443

display matrices:

size:	14pt	18pt	24pt	30pt	36pt	42pt	48pt	60pt	72pt
line:	T.1533	T.1948	T.2640	T.3194	T.3884	T.4576	T.5268	T.6651	T.7930

243: Gloucester Bold Extended Roman

composition matrices: UA.75 = 6-12pt,

size:	6pt (6D)	8pt (8D)	10pt (9D)	11pt (10D)	12pt (11D)
set:	6	7.25	9	9.75	11.25
line:	M.1276	M.1323	M.1400	M.1433	M.1500

display matrices:

size:	14pt	18pt	24pt	30pt	36pt	42pt	48pt	60pt	72pt
line:	T.1533	T.1948	T.2640	T.3194	T.3884	T.4576	T.5268	T.6651	T.7930

395: Gloucester Bold Extra Condensed Roman

display matrices: 14-72pt

size:	14pt	18pt	24pt	30pt	36pt	42pt	48pt	60pt	72pt
line:	T.1580	T.2015	T.2676	T.3194	T.3884	T.4576	T.5268	T.6651	T.7930

160: Gloucester Bold Italic

composition matrices: UA.3 = 6-12pt,

size:	6pt (6D)	8pt (8D)	9pt (8D)	10pt (9D)	12pt (11D)
set:	6.75	8	9	10.25	11.5
line:	M.1276	M.1323	M.1353	M.1400	M.1500

396: Gloucester Extra Condensed Roman

display matrices: 14-72pt

size:	14pt	18pt	24pt	30pt	36pt	42pt	48pt
line:	T.1533	T.1948	T.2640	T.3194	T.3884	T.4576	T.5268

_99: Gloucester Old Style Roman/italic

composition matrices: UA.4 = 6-13.5pt,

size:	6pt (6D)	7.5pt (7D)	8pt (8D)	9pt (8D)	10pt (9D)	11pt (10D)	11.5pt (11D)	12pt (11D)	13.5pt (13D)
set:	6	7.25	7.25	8	9	9.75	10.5	11.25	12.75
line:	M.1276	M.1323	M.1323	M.1352	M.1400	M.1433	M.1467	M.1500	M.1563

large composition: 18pt (18D) UA.116, Roman/italic, 24pt (24D) UA.117, Roman/italic

size:	18pt (18D)	24pt (24D)
set:	16	21.5
line:	T.1984	T.2640

display matrices:

size:	14pt	18pt	24pt	30pt	36pt	42pt	48pt	60pt	72pt
line:	T.1533	T.1948	T.2640	T.3194	T.3884	T.4576	T.5268	T.6651	T.7930

- Gothic (collective name for sans serif typefaces)

__4: Gothic (synonym: Grotesque Condensed) (cancelled in 1967)

composition matrices UA.1B 6pt - 12pt

size:	6pt (6D)	8pt (8D)	9pt (8D)	10pt (9D)	12pt (12D)
set:	6.5	8	8.5	9.25	12
line:	M.1220	M.1260	M.1290	M.1320	M.1360

- Goudy

269: Goudy Bold Roman/italic

composition matrices: UA.88 = 6-14pt,

size:	6pt (6D)	8pt (8D)	10pt (10D)	11pt (10D)	12pt (12D)	14pt (14D)
set:	7.5	9.25	11	11.75	12.75	15.5
line:	M.1250	M.1286	M.1362	M.1386	M.1425	M.1620

display matrices:

size:	14pt	18pt	24pt	30pt	36pt	42pt
line:	T.1518	T.1965	T.2590	T.3124	T.3824	T.4427

441: Goudy Bold Roman/italic

composition matrices: UA.382 = 6-12pt,

size:	6pt (6D)	8pt (8D)	10pt (10D)	11pt (10D)	12pt (12D)
set:	6.75	8.5	10.25	11.25	12.25
line:	M.1246	M.1295	M.1370	M.1407	M.1442

268: Goudy Cataloque Roman/italic

composition matrices: UA.83 = 6-14pt,

size:	6pt (6D)	8pt (8D)	9pt (9D)	10pt (10D)	12pt (12D)	14pt (14D)
set:	7	8.75	9.25	10.25	12	14
line:	M.1250	M.1294	M.1325	M.1377	M.1447	M.1592

display matrices:

size:	14pt	18pt	24pt	30pt	36pt	42pt	48pt
line:	T.1470	T.1980	T.2620	T.3194	T.3884	T.4576	T.5268

364: Goudy Cataloque Roman/italic

composition matrices: UA.1 = 5-6pt, UA.419 = 7pt-7.75pt,

size:	5pt (5D)	5,5pt (6D)	6pt (6D)	7pt (7D)	7.75pt op 8pE (8D)
set:	5.5	6.25	7.75	8.5	9.25
line:	M.1190	M.1208	M.1240	M.1253	M.1282

214: Goudy Extra Bold Roman/italic

composition matrices: UA.88 = 6-14pt,

size:	6pt (6D)	8pt (8D)	8D op 9pE	9pt (9D)	10pt (10D)	12pt (12D)
set:	7.5	9	10.25	10.25	11.5	13.5
line:	M.1237	M.1285	M.1323	M.1323	M.1323	M.1385

display matrices:

size:	14pt	18pt	24pt	30pt	36pt	42pt	48pt	60pt	72pt
line:	T.1395	T.1810	T.2502	T.3056	T.3746	T.4406	T.5048	T.6340	T.7550

249: Goudy Modern Roman/italic

composition matrices: UA.87 = 10-12pt,

size:	10pt (9D)	11pt (10D)	12pt (12D)
set:	9.25	10	11.25
line:	M.1235	M.1256	M.1290

display matrices:

size:	14pt	18pt	24pt	30pt	36pt	42pt	48pt
line:	T.1257	T.1671	T.2226	T.2780	T.3332	T.3886	T.4438

291: Goudy Old Style Roman/italic

composition matrices: UA.312 = 6-14pt, long descenders available, Swash capitals in: 42, 60, 72pt

size:	6pt (6D)	8pt (8D)	8pt long desc.	10pt	10pt long desc.	11pt short desc.	11pt	12pt	14pt
didot:	6D	8D	9D op 9pE	10D	11D	10D op 11pE	11D	12D	14D
set:	6.75	8.5	8.5	10.25	10.25	11.25	11.25	12.25	15
line:	M.1246	M.1295	M.1295	M.1370	M.1370	M.1407	M.1407	M.1442	M.1630

display matrices:

size:	14pt	18pt	24pt	30pt	36pt	42pt	48pt	60pt	72pt
line:	T.1538	T.1948	T.2606	T.3184	T.3874	T.4427	T.5118	T.6364	T.7609

292: Goudy Text (gotisch schrift)

composition matrices: UA.339 = 9-12pt, can be combined with 293 Lombardic Capitals

size:	9pt (8D)	10pt (10D)	12pt (12D)
set:	7.5	8	9.5
line:	M.1354	M.1356	M.1425

display matrices:

size:	14pt	18pt	24pt	36pt	48pt
line:	T.1523	T.1939	T.2590	T.3884	T.5268

439: Goudy Titling Roman

- Gravura

533: Gravura Roman (cancelled in 1965)

composition matrices: UA.1 = 12pt

size:	12pt (12D)
set:	10
line:	M.1325

- Grock

388: Grock Roman

display matrices:

size:	24pt	36pt	48pt
line:	T.3160	T.4744	T.6398

- Grosvenor Script

493: Grosvenor Script italic

display matrices:

size:	18pt
line:	T.1980

- Grotesque (collective name for sans serif typefaces)

_11: Grotesque (see: 11 Grotesque Bold Condensed)
_33: Grotesque (see: 33 Grotesque Condensed)
_51: Grotesque Roman/italic

composition matrices: UA.2 = 6-12pt, UA.124 = 14pt-18pt, UA.125= 24pt

size:	6pt (6D)	8pt (8D)	9pt (8D)	10pt (9D)	11pt (10D)	12pt (11D)
set:	7.75	9.5	10.25	11.5	12.5	15.5
line:	M.1220	M.1235	M.1265	M.1291	M.1315	M.1444

large composition:

size:	14pt (14D)	18pt (18D)	24pt (24D)
set:	14	18	24
line:	T.1533	T.1984	T.2640

display matrices:

size:	14pt	18pt	22pt	24pt	30pt	36pt	42pt	48pt	60pt	72pt
line:	T.1533	T.1948	T.2308	T.2640	T.3194	T.3884	T.4576	T.5268	T.6651	T.7930

126: Grotesque (see: 126 Grotesque Light No. 1)
215: Grotesque Roman/italic (synonym: Grotesque No. 1)

composition matrices: 5pt = roman UA.421 and intslic UA.429, 6.5pt-13pt = roman UA.65 and italic UA.401

size:	5pt (5D)	6.5pt (6D)	7.5pt (7D)	8pt (8D)	9pt (8D)	10pt (9D)	11pt (10D)	13pt (12D)
set:	5.25	6.75	7.5	7.75	8.5	9.5	10.25	12.5
line:	M.1208	M.1265	M.1287	M.1292	M.1322	M.1371	M.1405	M.1495

display matrices:

size:	14D at 16pE	16D at 18pE	18D at 20pE	20D at 22pE	24D at 30pE	30D at 36pE	36D at 36pE	48D at 60pE	60D at 72pE	72pt
line:	T.1630	T.1852	T.2076	T.2300	T.2780	T.3565	T.4164	T.5570	T.7040	T.7900

216: Grotesque (see: 216 Grotesque Bold)
274: Grotesque (see: 274 Grotesque Light Condensed)
389: Grotesque No. 2 (see: 389 Grotesque Light)
212: Grotesque Roman (cancelled in 1964)

composition matrices: UA.62 = 6.5pt

size:	6.5pt at 7pE (6D)
set:	7
line:	M.1393

_73: Grotesque Bold No. 3 Roman

composition matrices: UA.3 = 6-13pt

size:	6pt (6D)	6.5pt at 7pE (6D)	7.5pt at 8pE (7D)	9pt (8D)	10pt (9D)	11pt (10D)	12pt (12D)	13pt (12D)
set:	7.25	7.75	8.5	9.75	10	11	12.25	13
line:	M.1211	M.1225	M.1240	M.1260	M.1290	M.1320	M.1360	M.1390

_97: Grotesque Bold Roman (in red: withdrawn around 197(?) )

composition matrices: UA.2 = 7.7pt

size:	7.5pt (7D)
set:	9.5
line:	M.1262

216: Grotesque Bold No. 2 Roman/italic combines with Series No. 215 Grotesque

composition matrices: 6.5pt-13pt = UA.66

size:	5pt (5D)	6.5pt (6D)	7.5pt (7D)	8pt (8D)	9pt (8D)	10pt (9D)	11pt (10D)	13pt (12D)
set:	5.25	6.75	7.5	7.75	8.5	9.5	10.25	12.5
line:	M.1208	M.1265	M.1287	M.1292	M.1322	M.1371	M.1405	M.1495

display matrices:

size:	14D at 16pE	16D at 18pE	18D at 20pE	20D at 22pE	24D at 30pE	30D at 36pE	36D at 36pE	48D at 60pE	60D at 72pE	72pt
line:	T.1630	T.1852	T.2076	T.2300	T.2780	T.3565	T.4164	T.5570	T.7040	T.7900

680: Grotesque Bold Roman (see: Bell Gothic 619)

composition matrices UA.502 6pt

size:	6pt (6D)
set:	7
line:	M.1245

_11: Grotesque Bold Condensed (cancelled in 1967)

composition matrices: UA-2, 6pt & 9pt (synonym: Grotesque)

size:	6pt (6D)	9pt (8D)
set:	6.5	8
line:	M.1225	M.1260

_15: Grotesque Bold Condensed No. 2 Roman/italic (synonym: series 15 Sans Serif)

composition matrices Roman: UA.2 = 6pt - 12pt
6pt (6D) with short descenders: 6.5 set line .1225

size:	6pt (6D)	7pt (7D)	8pt (8D)	9pt (8D)	10pt (9D)	11pt (10D)	12pt (12D)
set:	6.5	7.75	8	8.75	10	10.75	12
line:	M.1225	M.1255	M.1285	M.1310	M.1355	M.1380	M.1430

display matrices:

size:	14pt	18pt	24pt	30pt	36pt
line:	T.1533	T.1948	T.2640	T.3194	T.3884

365: Grotesque Bold Condensed (synonym: 365 Heavy Narrow Gothic) (cancelled in 1967)

composition matrices UA.333 = 10pt - 12pt

size:	10pt (10D)	12pt (12D)
set:	8.75	10.25
line:	M.1410	M.1490

_81: Grotesque Bold Condensed Roman

composition matrices: UA.2 = 10pt

size:	10pt (9D)
set:	9.5
line:	M.1301

166: Grotesque Bold Condensed No. 4 (synonym: 166 Grotesque Bold Condensed Titling)

composition matrices: UA.403 = 12pt, UA.121 = 14pt

size:	12pt (12D)
set:	12
line:	M.1590

large composition:

size:	14pt (14D)
set:	14
line:	T.1691

display matrices:

size:	14pt	18pt	24pt	30pt	36pt	42pt	48pt	60pt	72pt
line:	T.1671	T.2085	T.2778	T.3470	T.4299	T.4991	T.5821	T.7204	T.8623

166: Grotesque Bold Condensed Titling Roman (see: 166 Grotesque Bold Condensed No. 4)
527: Grotesque Bold Condensed Titling Roman

display matrices:

size:	72pt
line:	T.9700

150: Grotesque Bold Extended No. 1 Roman/italic

composition matrices: 6pt-12pt, 7pt and 9pt only italic

size:	6pt (6D)	7pt (7D)	8pt (8D)	9pt (8D)	10pt (9D)	11pt (10D)	12pt (11D)
UA. rom:	22	.	40	.	40	40	40
UA. curs.	309	310	310	310	310	310	130
set:	6.5	8.75	10	11	12	13	14
line:	M.1200	M.1245	M.1280	M.1306	M.1365	M.1395	M.1470

large composition:

size:	18pt (18D)	24pt (24D)
set:	19.5	26
line:	T.1948	T.2640

display matrices:

size:	14pt	18pt	22pt	24pt	30pt	36pt	42pt	48pt	60pt	72pt
line:	T.1533	T.1948	T.2308	T.2640	T.3194	T.3884	T.4576	T.5268	T.6651	T.7930

168: Grotesque Bold Extended (cancelled in 1967)
524: Grotesque Bold Titling Roman

display matrices:

size:	72pt
line:	T.9700

_33: Grotesque Condensed No. 2 Roman

composition matrices: UA.2 = 6pt-13.5pt

size:	6pt (6D)	7pt (7D)	8pt (8D)	9pt (8D)	10pt (9D)	11pt (10D)	12pt (11D)	13pt (12D)	13.5pt (14D)
set:	6.75	7	8	8.5	9.25	9.75	11.25	11.25	12.5
line:	M.1255	M.1255	M.1285	M.1315	M.1365	M.1395	M.1455	M.1440	M.1517

large composition, UA.395 = 22pt :

size:	22pt (20D)
set:	14
line:	T.2350

display matrices:

size:	14pt	18pt	22pt	24pt	30pt	36pt	42pt	48pt	60pt	72pt
line:	T.1533	T.1948	T.2308	T.2640	T.3194	T.3884	T.4576	T.5268	T.6651	T.7930

318: Grotesque Condensed Roman

composition matrices: UA.388 = 5D, 6pt, UA.300 = 6D-13pt

size:	5D at 6pE	6pt (6D)	6D at 7pE	7D at 8pE	8pt (8D)	9pt (8D)	10pt (9D)	11pt (10D)	12pt (12D)	13pt (12D)
set:	5	5.25	5.5	6.5	6.75	7.5	8.25	9.25	10.25	11
line:	M.1220	M.1248	M.1264	M.1307	M.1328	M.1373	M.1410	M.1459	M.1505	M.1551

display matrices:

size:	14pt	18pt	24pt	30pt	36pt	48pt
line:	T.1544	T.1948	T.2640	T.3332	T.4022	T.5406

383: Grotesque Condensed No. 4 Roman

composition matrices: UA.341 = 5D-12D

size:	6D at 7pE	8D at 9pE	10D at 11pE	12D at 13pE
set:	5	6	7	8
line:	M.1280	M.1358	M.1410	M.1500

display matrices:

size:	14D at 16pE	18D at 20pE	24D at 30pE	30D at 36pE	36D at 36pE	42pt at 48pE	48D at 60pE	60D at 72pE	72pt
line:	T.1626	T.2074	T.2776	T.3565	T.4164	T.4879	T.5620	T.7030	T.7890

__4: Grotesque Condensed (see: Gothic Series No. 4)
383: Grotesque Condensed Heavy (see: 383 Grotesque Condensed)
523: Grotesque Condensed Titling Roman

display matrices:

size:	72pt
line:	T.9700

215: Grotesque Half Fat (see: 215 Grotesque No. 1)
126: Grotesque Light No. 1 Roman/italic

composition matrices: UA.420/UA.431 = 5pt-5.5pt, UA.64/UA.396 = 6.5pt-13pt

size:	5pt (5D)	5.5pt (5D)	6.5pt (6D)	7.5pt (7D)	8pt (8D)	9pt (8D)	10pt (9D)	11pt (10D)	13pt (12D)
set:	5.25	5.75	6.75	7.5	7.75	8.5	9.5	10.25	12.5
line:	M.1208	M.1231	M.1265	M.1287	M.1292	M.1322	M.1371	M.1405	M.1495

display matrices:

size:	14D at 16pE	18D at 20pE	24D at 30pE	30D at 36pE	36D at 36pE	48D at 60pE
line:	T.1630	T.2076	T.2780	T.3565	T.4164	T.5570

389: Grotesque Light (synonym: 389 Grotesque No. 2) (cancelled in 1967)

composition matrices: UA.2 = 8pt-12pt

size:	8pt (8D)	9pt (8D)	10pt (9D)	11pt (10D)	12pt (12D)
set:	9.5	10.25	11.25	12.5	15.5
line:	M.1235	M.1265	M.1291	M.1315	M.1444

274: Grotesque Light Condensed No. 2 Roman

composition matrices: UA.427 =5D, UA.94 = 6D-13pt

size:	5D at 6pE	6D at 7pE	7D at 8pE	8pt (8D)	9pt (8D)	10pt (9D)	11pt (10D)	12pt (12D)	13pt (12D)
set:	5	5.5	6.5	6.75	7.5	8.25	9.25	10.25	11
line:	M.1220	M.1264	M.1307	M.1328	M.1373	M.1410	M.1459	M.1505	M.1551

204: Grotesque Light Condensed (synonym: 204 Light face Gothic) (cancelled in 1967)

composition matrices: UA.58 = 12pt

size:	12pt (12D)
set:	10.25
line:	M.1360

display matrices:

size:	14pt	18pt
line:	T.1395	T.1810

405: Grotesque Light Condensed (cancelled in 1967)
405: Grotesque Narrow (see: 405 Grotesque Light Condensed)
177: Grotesque Newspaper Smalls (see: 177 Newspaper Small Ads)
216: Grotesque 3/4 Fat (see: 216 Grotesque Bold No. 1)
502: Grotesque Timetable (cancelled in 1967)
524: Grotesque Titling (see: 524 Grotesque Bold Titling)

- Gwendolin

208: Gwendolin (cancelled in 1967)

- Gustavus

484: Gustavus Bold (cancelled in 1965)
497: Gustavus Light (cancelled in 1965)

==== H ====
- Haarlemmer

531: Haarlemmer Roman (withdrawn in 1967) design: Jan van Krimpen

composition matrices: UA.408 = 14D

size:	14D
set:	12.75
line:	M.1500

- Half Fat Modern Mediaeval

_52: Half Fat Modern Mediaeval Roman (synonym: 52 Schurmann Antiqua Halbfette) (withdrawn in 196(?) )

composition matrices: UA.5

size:	6D op 7pE	7D op 8pE	9pt (8D)	10pt (9D)	11pt (10D)	12D op 13pE
set:	7.75	9	9.25	9.75	10.5	12.7
line:	M.1264	M.1307	M.1338	M.1399	M.1425	M.1517

- Headline bold

595: Headline Bold Roman/italic

composition matrices: UA.443 = 6-14pt

size:	6pt (6D)	7pt (7D)	8pt (8D)	9pt (9D)	10pt (10D)	11pt (11D)	12pt (12D)	14pt (14D)
set:	6.75	8	8.75	9.75	10.75	11.75	12.75	14.75
line:	M.1245	M.1287	M.1320	M.1358	M.1397	M.1431	M.1474	M.1624

display matrices:

size:	14pt	18pt	24pt	30pt	36pt	42pt	48pt	60pt	72pt
line:	T.1533	T.1948	T.2640	T.3194	T.3884	T.4576	T.5268	T.6651	T.7930

- Heavy

223: Heavy Antique (see: Devonshire Bold)
282: Heavy Egyptian (see: 282 Egyptian Bold Condensed) (synonym Egyptian Heavy)
365: Heavy Narrow Gothic (see: 365 Grotesque Bold Condensed) (cancelled in 1967)
435: Heavy Shadow French (cancelled in ??)
337: Heavy Small Caps (cancelled in 1974)

- Helvetica

765: Helvetica Roman/italic

combines with 766 Helvetica Medium, equivalent with Stempel's Helvetica halbfett, and Linotype Helvetica Bold
composition matrices: UA.508 = 6D-12D

size:	6D op 7pE	7D op 8pE	8D op 9pE	9D op 10pE	10D op 11pE	12D op 13pE
set:	7	7.75	8.75	9.75	10.75	12.75
line:	M.1230	M.1255	M.1290	M.1328	M.1360	M.1430

766: Helvetica Medium Roman/italic

composition matrices: UA.508 = 6D-12D

size:	6D at 7pE	7D at 8pE	8D at 9pE	9D at 10pE	10D at 11pE	12D at 13pE
set:	7	7.75	8.75	9.75	10.75	12.75
line:	M.1230	M.1255	M.1290	M.1328	M.1360	M.1430

- Horley Old Style

261: Horley Old Face Heavy (see: 261 Horley Old Style Bold)
188: Horley Old Style (replaced by 199, cancelled in 1965)
199: Horley Old Style Roman/italic

composition matrices: UA.56 = 6-13pt, UA.362 = 14pt

size:	6pt (6D)	8pt (8D)	9pt (9D)	10pt (9D)	11pt (10D)	12pt (12D)	13pt (12D)	14pt (14D)
set:	6.75	8.25	9.25	10	10.75	11.75	12.75	13
line:	M.1250	M.1296	M.1328	M.1362	M.1392	M.1435	M.1473	M.1520

large composition: Roman = UA.367

size:	18pt	24pt
set:	16.6	22
line:	T.1828	T.2390

display matrices:

size:	14pt	18pt	24pt	30pt	36pt
line:	T.1422	T.1828	T.2390	T.2944	T.3634

261: Horley Old Style Bold Roman/italic

composition matrices: UA.80 = 6-13pt

size:	6pt (6D)	8pt (8D)	9pt (9D)	10pt (9D)	11pt (10D)	12pt (12D)	13pt (12D)
set:	6.75	8.25	9.25	10	10.75	11.75	12.75
line:	M.1250	M.1296	M.1328	M.1362	M.1392	M.1435	M.1473

display matrices:

size:	14pt	18pt	24pt	30pt	36pt	42pt	84pt	60pt	72pt
line:	T.1422	T.1828	T.2390	T.2944	T.3634	T.4276	T.4898	T.6150	T.7380

- 923: Hungry Dutch, roman

composition matrices, 12pt, no italic available
Design: Russell Maret, a revival of a typeface cut in 1686 by Peter van Walpengen for Bishop John Fell of Oxford. After 50 years this was in 2020 the first design for a font to cast in composition.

==== I ====
- Imprint

101: Imprint Roman/italic

combines with series 310 or 410
composition matrices: UA.4 = 6-12pt, UA.4a = 13.5pt

size:	6pt (6D)	6.5pt (6D)	7pt (7D)	8pt (8D)	9pt (8D)	10pt (9D)	11pt (10D)	12pt (11D)	13.5pt on 14pE
set:	7	7.75	7.75	8.5	9.25	9.5	10.25	11.75	13.25
line:	M.1237	M.1257	M.1257	M.1285	M.1312	M.1300	M.1325	M.1375	M.1440

large composition:

size:	16pt (16D)	18pt (18D)	24pt (24D)
UA.Roman	106	106	107
UA.italic	missing	128	129
set:	16	18	24
line:	T.1609	T.1810	T.2364

display matrices:

size:	14pt	16pt	18pt	20pt	24pt	30pt	36pt
line:	T.1395	T.1609	T.1810	T.1998	T.2364	T.2918	T.3608

310: Imprint Bold Roman/italic

combines with series 101
composition matrices: UA.98 = 6pt-13.5pt

size:	6pt (6D)	6.5pt (6D)	7pt (7D)	8pt (8D)	9pt (8D)	10pt (9D)	11pt (10D)	12pt (11D)	13.5pt at 14pE
set:	7	7.75	7.75	8.5	9.25	9.5	10.25	11.75	13.25
line:	M.1237	M.1257	M.1257	M.1285	M.1312	M.1300	M.1325	M.1375	M.1440

410: Imprint Bold No. 2 Roman/italic

combines with series 101
composition matrices: 6-13.5pt

size:	6pt (6D)	7pt short desc. op 6.5pE (6D)	7pt (7D)	8pt (8D)	9pt (8D)	10pt (9D)	11pt (10D)	11pt large face (11D)	12pt 12D)	13.5pt on 14pE (14D)
UA.Roman	348	348	348	348	348	348	348	348	348
UA.italic	76	76	76	76	76	76	76	geen italic	76	76
set:	7	7.75	7.75	8.5	9.25	9.5	10.25	11	11.75	13.25
line:	M.1237	M.1257	M.1257	M.1285	M.1312	M.1300	M.1325	M.1346	M.1375	M.1440

310: Imprint Heavy No. 1 (see: 310 Imprint Bold)
410: Imprint Heavy No. 2 (see: 410 Imprint Bold)
101: Imprint Old Face (see: 101 Imprint)
190: Imprint Shadow Roman/italic

display matrices

size:	60pt	72pt
line:	T.6237	M.7516

- Indicateur

462: Indicateur (cancelled in 1967)

- Inflex Bold

366: Inflex Bold Roman

composition matrices: UA.344 = 5pt-9pt, combines with: Series No. 342 Ionic

size:	5pt (5D)	5.5pt (6D)	6pt (6D)	7pt (7D)	8pt (8D)	9pt (9D)
set:	5.5	6	6.75	7.5	8.5	9.25
line:	M.1220	M.1242	M.1270	M.1290	M.1327	M.1355

- Inflex Timetable

503: Inflex Timetable (see: Bold Face)

- Ionic

__6: Ionic (see: 6 Modern no.4) (cancelled in 1967)
265: Ionic No. 1 Roman/italic (cancelled in 1967)

composition matrices: UA.321 = 6pt-6.5pt

size:	6pt (6D)	6.5pt (6D)
set:	7	7.75
line:	M.1237	M.1248

342: Ionic No. 2 Roman/italic (see also: 562 Ionic 2-line

composition matrices: UA.317 = 5pt-9pt

size:	5pt (5D)	5.5pt (6D)	6pt (6D)	7pt (7D)	8pt (8D)	9pt (9D)
set:	5.5	6	6.75	7.5	8.5	9.25
line:	M.1220	M.1242	M.1270	M.1290	M.1327	M.1355

184: Ionic No. 3 Roman (synonym : 184 Egyptian) (cancelled in 1967)

composition matrices: UA.51 = 6pt

size:	6pt (6D)
set:	6.75
line:	M.1255

153: Ionic No. 4 Roman (cancelled in 1967)

composition matrices: UA.1 = 8pt

size:	8pt (8D)
set:	10.75
line:	M.1285

416: Ionic No. 5 Roman/italic (cancelled in 1967)

composition matrices: UA.1 = 7D-8D

size:	7D op 8pE	8D op 9pE
set:	9.25	9.75
line:	M.1266	M.1329

451: Ionic No. 6 Roman/italic (cancelled in 1967)

composition matrices: UA.380 = 6pt-7pt

size:	6pt (6D)	7pt (7D)
set:	6.75	7.5
line:	M.1270	M.1290

476: Ionic (destroyed in a bombardment)
562: Ionic Two-line Roman only 10 pt high capitals, numbers and signs (see also: 342 Ionic)

composition matrices: UA.317(?) = 5pt,
In a die case combined with series 342-5pt this produces 10pt large initials, to produce advertisements. All can be done in one machine-run.

size:	5pt (5D)
set:	8.25
line:	M.1610

- Iroquois Condensed

_23: Iroquois Condensed Roman (cancelled in 1964)

UA.2, 8pt, 10pt, 12 pt

size:	8pt (8D)	10pt (9D)	12pt (12D)
set:	8.5	9.75	12
line:	M.1305	M.1390	M.1480

- Italian Old Style

108: Italian Old Style Roman/italic

composition matrices: UA.4 = 6pt-13pt

size:	6pt (6D)	7pt (7D)	8pt (8D)	9pt (9D)	10pt (9D)	11pt (10D)	12pt (11D)	13pt (12D)
set:	6.75	7.5	8.25	9	9.75	10.5	12	13
line:	M.1237	M.1268	M.1286	M.1313	M.1338	M.1364	M.1420	M.1448

display matrices:

size:	14pt	18pt	24pt	30pt	36pt
line:	T.1533	T.1948	T.2640	T.3194	T.3884

149: Italian Old Style Bold Roman

composition matrices: UA.5 = 6pt-13pt

size:	6pt (6D)	7pt (7D)	8pt (8D)	9pt (9D)	10pt (9D)	11pt (10D)	12pt (11D)	13pt (12D)
set:	6.75	7.5	8	8.75	9.75	10.5	12	13
line:	M.1237	M.1268	M.1286	M.1313	M.1338	M.1364	M.1420	M.1448

display matrices:

size:	14pt	16pt	18pt	20pt	24pt	30pt	36pt
line:	T.1533	T.1737	T.1948	T.2152	T.2640	T.3194	T.3884

149: Italian Old Style Display (see: 149 Italian Bold Style Bold & Veronese (typeface))

- Italic Display

_54: Italic Display (see: 54 Modern Bold Italic)

==== J ====
- Jacno

579: Jacno (experimental)

- Janson

646: Janson (cancelled in 1972)
Am. 401 Janson Roman
Am. 4011 Janson italic

- Jenson

Am. 58 Jenson Old Style
Am. 258 Jenson Condensed

- Joanna

478: Joanna Roman/italic

composition matrices: UA.449 = 8pt-14pt

size:	8pt (8D)	9pt (9D)	10pt (10D)	11pt (11D)	12pt (12D)	14pt (14D)
set:	8.5	9.5	10	11	12	14
line:	M.1230	M.1260	M.1283	M.1310	M.1340	M.1460

display matrices:

size:	18pt	24pt	30pt	36pt
line:	T.1755	T.2364	T.2918	T.3504

- Jocunda

369: Jocunda Roman only capitals, numbers and signs (cancelled in 1967)

display matrices:

size:	36pt
line:	T.3606

==== K ====
- Kaatskill

311: Kaatskill (cancelled in 1967)

- Kennerley

Am:

- Kino

305: Kino Roman

display matrices:

size:	18pt	24pt	30pt	36pt
line:	T.1927	T.2572	T.3154	T.3854

- Klang

593: Klang italic

display matrices:

size:	14pt	18pt	24pt	30pt	36pt	42pt	48pt	60pt	72pt
line:	T.1533	T.1948	T.2640	T.3194	T.3884	T.4576	T.5268	T.6651	T.7930

==== L ====
- Lamp

490: Lamp (cancelled)

- Latin Antique

__9: Latin Antique Roman

composition matrices: UA-2 (6-13pt) (synonym: Latin Antique)

size:	6pt (6D)	7pt (7D)	8pt (8D)	9pt (8D)	10pt (9D)	11pt (10D)	12pt (12D)	13pt (12D)
set:	6.5	7.25	8	9	9.5	10.5	12	12.5
line:	M.1230	M.1258	M.1270	M.1300	M.1310	M.1370	M.1380	M.1388

_60: Latin Antique Roman (synonym: 60 Latin Antique No. 2

composition matrices: UA.2 = 8-12pt

size:	8pt (8D)	10pt (9D)	11pt (10D)	12pt (12D)
set:	8	9	9.75	11.25
line:	M.1223	M.1301	M.1323	M.1369

_78: Latin Antique Roman

composition matrices: UA.2 = 6-13pt

size:	6pt (6D)	7pt (7D)	8pt (8D)	9pt (8D)	10pt (9D)	11pt (10D)	12pt (12D)	13pt (12D)
set:	7.75	8.25	9.25	9.75	10	11	12.25	13
line:	M.1245	M.1240	M.1270	M.1280	M.1301	M.1323	M.1369	M.1388

_84: Latin Antique (cancelled) (synonym: 84 Latin Antique no. 4)

composition matrices: UA.2 = 6-12pt

size:	6pt (6D)	9pt (8D)	11pt (10D)	12pt (12D)
set:	7	8.5	10.25	11.75
line:	M.1235	M.1262	M.1323	M.1369

419: Latin Condensed Roman

display matrices:

size:	24D op 30pE	28D op 30pE	36D op 36pE	48D op 60pE	60D op 72pE	72pt
line:	T.2686	T.3182	T.4044	T.5410	T.6800	T.7630

164: Latin Wide (cancelled in 1967)

composition matrices: UA.19 = 8pt

size:	8pt (8D)
set:	7.5
line:	M.1250

- Laudian Old Style

450: Laudian Old Style Roman/italic

composition matrices: UA.1 = 5.5pt-7.75pt

size:	5.5pt (5.5D)	7.75pt (8D)
set:	6.75	8.5
line:	M.1270	M.1282

454: Laudian Old Style (destroyed by bombs)

- Lectern Missal

538: Lectern Missal Roman (see: Missal 393)

- Leysbourne

348: Leysbourne (cancelled in 1965)

12 pt 10.5 set line.1325 UA.359

- Light

505: Light Extra Condensed (see: 505 Placard light Extra Condensed)
204: Light Face Gothic (see: 204 Grotesque Light Condensed)
113: Light Face Plantin (see: 113 Plantin Light)
522: Light Placard Titling (see: 522 Placard Condensed Titling)
475: Light Script (see: 475 Script Light)

- Littleworth

284: Littleworth (cancelled in 1967)

UA.=317, composition: 12pt = 10.5 set line.1336, 16pt display matrices line.1557

- Lombardic Capitals

293: Lombardic Capitals (see: 292 Goudy Text 292)

- L.P.T.B. Titling

517: L.P.T.B. Titling (cancelled in 1965)

- Lutetia, this early design of Jan van Krimpen was modified for Monotype. Jan van Krimpen had given his permission to change his design for hand composing of Lettergieterij Amsterdam to edit it for machine composition. Later he had to admit that the result was very good. But he added immediately that "if" he had known this in advance ... he never would have agreed ... to get as close as possible to the original design to be able to stay, it was necessary to make another unit-arrangement for each size. Consequently, it was a very expensive for the printer customers, since each size with another wedge had to be poured. Also on the keyboard keybanks for each size was another requirement, and extra wedges also had to be purchased.

255: Lutetia Roman/italic

composition matrices Unit arrangements different for each size

size:	8D	10D	12D	14D	16D	20D
UA Roman:	334	306	307	308	170	172
UA italic:	334	306	308	308	171	172
set:	7.5	8	10.75	11.75	13.5	16.5
line:	M.1215	M.1276	M.1305	M.1488	M.1488	M.1980

display matrices:

size:	28D	36D	48D
line:	T.2754	T.3554	T.4790

==== M ====
- Mardersteig

347: Mardersteig

Never produced, only one proof-set was made for Giovanni Mardersteig himself. The matrices were lost.

- Matura

496: Matura script

display matrices:

size:	18pt	24pt	30pt	36pt	42pt	48pt
line:	T.1841	T.2458	T.3014	T.3674	T.4316	T.4958

- Matura scriptorial Capitals

528: Matura scriptorial Capitals (combines with 496 Matura)

display matrices:

size:	24pt
line:	T.3170

- Mediaeval

125: Mediaeval Roman (cancelled in 1965)
134: Mediaeval Roman (cancelled in 1965)
136: Mediaeval Roman (cancelled in 1965)
_88: Mediaeval Modern (see: 88 Modern Mediaeval)
_52: Mediaeval Modern Half-Fat (see: 52 Half-Fat Modern Mediaeval) (synonyms: 52 Schurmann Antiqua Halbfette, Half-Fat Modern Mediaeval) (cancelled in 196?)
_67: Mediaeval Old Style (see: 67 Old Style)

- Menhart

397: Menhart Roman/italic

composition matrices: UA.378 = 10D-14

size:	10D at 11pE	14D at 16pE
set:	9.5	13.5
line:	M.1314	M.1596

display matrices:

size:	18D at 20pE	24D at 30pE
line:	T.1841	T.2536

- Mercurius Bold Script

583: Mercurius Bold Script

display matrices:

size:	14D at 16pE	18D at 20pE	24D at 30pE	30D at 36pE	36D at 36pE	48D at 60pE	60D at 72pE	72pt
line:	T.1556	T.1985	T.2656	T.3405	T.3974	T.5360	T.6720	T.7540

- Missal

336: Missal
393: Missal Roman
448: Missal No. 3
459: Missal No. 4

- Modern

__1: Modern No. 1 Roman/italic

1901, after a design of Miller & Richards
composition matrices: UA-1 (6-12pt), UA-1a(14pt),

size:	6pt (6D)	7pt (7D)	8pt (8D)	9pt (8D)	10pt (9D)	11pt (10D)	12pt (12D)	14pt (small face)(14D)
set:	6.75	7	8	8.5	9.25	9.75	11.25	13.5
line:	M.1210	M.1208	M.1237	M.1260	M.1290	M.1310	M.1360	M.1405

_80: Modern No. 2 (cancelled in 1967)

190?, composition matrices: UA-1,

size:	9D (8D)	10pt (9D)	11pt (10D)	12pt (12D)
set:	8.75	9.25	10	11.25
line:	M.1257	M.1290	M.1310	M.1369

189: Modern No. 3 Roman/italic

190?, composition matrices: UA-1,

size:	6D	7D at 8pt	8pt (8D)	9pt (9D)	10pt (9D)	11pt (10D)
set:	7	8	8.5	9.25	9.75	11.25
line:	M.1208	M.1237	M.1260	M.1290	M.1310	M.1360

__6: Modern No. 4 (cancelled in 1967) (synonym: Ionic)

190?, composition matrices: UA-1,

size:	8pt (8D)	10pt (9D)
set:	8	9.25
line:	M.1240	M.1290

_95: Modern No. 5 Roman/italic (cancelled in 1967)

composition matrices: UA-1 = 11pt

size:	11pt (10D)
set:	10.25
line:	M.1332

250: Modern No. 6 Roman (synonym: 250 Modern Condensed no.5)

composition matrices: UA.92 = 6.5pt UA=418 = 7D

size:	6.5pt (6D)	7D op 8pE
set:	6.5	7.5
line:	M.1230	M.1267

422: Modern No. 7 Roman/italic (cancelled in 1965)

composition matrices: UA.376 = 12 pt

size:	12pt (12D)
set:	13
line:	M.1380

471: Modern No. 8 Roman (cancelled in 1967)

composition matrices: UA.1 8D-10D

size:	8D at 9pE	9D at 10pE	10D at 11pE
set:	9	9.5	10.5
line:	M.1310	M.1365	M.1380

183: Modern Roman (synonym: 183 Modern no. 6) (cancelled in 1967)

display matrices,

size:	18pt
line:	T.1948

211: Modern Roman (see: 211 Century no.1)
257: Modern (synonym: 257 Modern Wide)

composition matrices: UA.1

size:	10pt (9D)	11pt (10D)
set:	10.5	11.25
line:	M.1294	M.1310

444: Modern (cancelled in 1936)
570: Modern Bold Roman, combines with: Modern Series No. 7

composition matrices: UA.2,

size:	6pt (6D)	7pt (7D)	8pt (8D)	9pt (8D)	10pt (9D)	11pt (10D)	12pt (11D)
set:	7	7.75	8.5	9.25	9.75	10.5	12
line:	M.1235	M.1210	M.1235	M.1260	M.1200	M.1310	M.1360

_54: Modern Bold Italic italic (synonym: 54 Italic-Display)

composition matrices: UA.3 = 6-12pt

size:	6pt (6D)	6.5pt (6D)	7D	8pt (8D)	9pt (8D)	10pt (9D)	11pt (10D)	12pt (12D)
set:	6.75	7.75	8.5	8.75	9.5	10	10.75	12.5
line:	M.1202	M.1216	M.1238	M.1235	M.1257	M.1391	M.1315	M.1363

display matrices:

size:	14pt (14D)	18pt (18D)
line:	T.1395	T.1810

263: Modern Cancellation Fount Roman (see: 263 Modern Extended 17)
_13: Modern Condensed No. 1 Roman/italic

composition matrices UA.1 = 6pt

size:	6pt (6D)
set:	6.5
line:	M.1185

_14: Modern Condensed No. 2 Roman/italic

composition matrices: UA.1 = 7 pt

size:	7pt (7D)
set:	7.25
line:	M.1220

_39: Modern Condensed No. 3 Roman/italic

composition matrices: UA.1,

size:	6.5pt (6D)	7.5pt (7D)	9pt (8D)	10pt (9D)	11pt (10D)	13pt (12D)
set:	6.5	7.5	8	8.75	9.5	11.25
line:	M.1225	M.1250	M.1260	M.1290	M.1320	M.1390

_79: Modern Condensed No. 4 Roman/italic (cancelled in 1965)

composition matrices: UA.1 = 11pt

size:	11pt (10D)
set:	8.75
line:	M.1375

250: Modern Condensed No. 5 Roman

composition matrices: UA.92 = 6.5pt, UA.418 = 7D

size:	6.5pt (6D)	7D op 8pE
set:	6.5	7.5
line:	M.1230	M.1267

__7: Modern Extended No. 1 Roman/italic,

1902, some bit wider version of Modern no.1
composition matrices: UA.1 = 6pt-12pt

size:	6pt (6D)	7pt (7D)	8pt (8D)	9pt (8D)	10pt (9D)	11pt (10D)	12pt (12D)
set:	7	7.75	8.5	9.25	9.75	10.5	12
line:	M.1235	M.1210	M.1235	M.1260	M.1290	M.1310	M.1360

_77: Modern Extended No. 2 Roman/italic (cancelled in 1967)

composition matrices, UA1 = 9pt-11pt

size:	9pt (8D)	11pt (10D)
set:	9.5	10.5
line:	M.1290	M.1375

447: Modern Extended No. 3 (cancelled in 1965)

composition matrices, UA1 = 8D-9D

size:	8D op 9pE	9D op 10pE
set:	8.75	9.5
line:	M.1341	M.1375

237: Modern French
247: Modern French (cancelled in 1965)
_88: Modern Mediaeval (cancelled in 1964)
_52: Modern Mediaeval (Half-Fat) (see: 52 Half-Fat Modern Mediaeval) (synonyms: 52 Schurmann Antiqua Halbfette, Half-Fat Modern Mediaeval) (cancelled in 196?)
500: Modern Timetable (cancelled in 1967)
179: Modern Titling Roman/italic (synonyms: 179 Titling 179, Titling Italic)

composition matrices: UA.1 = UA.8-12pt

size:	8pt (8D)	9pt (8D)	10pt (9D)	11pt (10D)	12pt (12D
set:	8.75	10.5	14.75	19.5
line:	M.1341	M.1455	M.1642	M.1755

_16: Modern Wide No. 1 Roman/italic

composition matrices: UA.1 = 5pt

size:	5pt (5D)
set:	6.5
line:	M.1240

_18: Modern Wide No. 2 Roman/italic (synonym: Modern Wide)

composition matrices: UA.1 = 6pt

size:	6pt (6D)
set:	7.75
line:	M.1245

_25: Modern Wide No. 3 Roman/italic (synonym: Modern Wide, also referred to as: Romano)

composition matrices UA.2 = 6pt - 12pt

size:	9pt (8D)	10pt (9D)	11pt (10D)	12pt (12D)
set:	9.25	10.25	11	12.5
line:	M.1260	M.1300	M.1318	M.1360

_26: Modern Wide No. 4 Roman/italic (synonym: Modern Wide)

composition matrices: UA.1 = 4.5pt-5pt

size:	4.5pt op 5pE (5D)	5pt (5D)
set:	5.5	5.5
line:	M.1173	M.1173

_30: Modern Wide No. 5 Roman/italic (synonym: Modern Wide)

composition matrices: UA.1 = 7pt-8pt

size:	7pt (7D)	8pt (8D)
set:	8.25	9.25
line:	M.1240	M.1270

_75: Modern Wide No. 6 (synonym: 75 Modern Wide) (cancelled in 1967)

composition matrices: UA.1 = 7Dt

size:	7D op 8pE
set:	9.5
line:	M.1262

257: Modern Wide No. 7 (cancelled in 1967)

composition matrices: UA.1 = 10pt-11pt

size:	10pt (9D)	11pt (10D)
set:	10.5	11.25
line:	M.1294	M.1320

- Modernistic

a297: Modernistic (Sorts) (cancelled vóór 1966)

- Morrison Face

537: Morrison Face (cancelled in 1964)

- Monoline Script

351: Monoline Script

- Musical signs

210: Musical signs
382: Musical signs

==== N ====
- Narrow

294: Narrow Bembo Italic (see: 294 Bembo Condensed Italic)
166: Narrow Gothic (see: 166 Grotesque Bold Condensed Titling)
527: Narrow Gothic Titling (see: 527 Grotesque Bold Condensed Titling)
405: Narrow Grotesque (see: 405 Grotesque Light Condensed)

- Nastaliq

402: Nastaliq (cancelled)

- Neo Didot

_27: Neo Didot Roman/italic

composition matrices: UA.1 = 6.5-13pt

size:	6.5pt (6D)	7.5pt (7D)	9pt (8D)	10pt (10D)	11pt (10D)	12pt (12D)	13pt (12D)
set:	7.75	8	9	9.75	10.5	11.5	12.5
line:	M.1235	M.1238	M.1270	M.1300	M.1320	M.1360	M.1390

_65: Neo Didot Roman/italic

composition matrices: UA.1 = 6.5-13pt

size:	6.5pt (6D)	7.5pt (7D)	9pt (8D)	10pt (10D)	11pt (10D)	12pt (12D)	13pt (12D)
set:	7.75	8.5	9.75	10	11	12.25	13
line:	M.1225	M.1240	M.1260	M.1290	M.1320	M.1360	M.1390

- New Clarendon

617: New Clarendon Roman/italic combines with: 618 New Clarendon Bold

composition matrices: UA.481 = 6-14pt

size:	6pt (6D)	8pt (8D)	10pt (10D)	12pt (12D)	14pt (14D)
set:	8	9.75	11.75	14	16.5
line:	M.1220	M.1285	M.1318	M.1380	M.1495

display matrices:

size:	14pt	16pt	18pt	24pt	30pt	36pt	42pt	48pt	60pt	72pt
line:	T.1395	T.1610	T.1805	T.2433	T.2987	T.3608	T.4231	T.4853	T.6098	T.7308

618: New Clarendon Bold Roman/italic

composition matrices: UA.481 = 6-14pt

size:	6pt (6D)	8pt (8D)	10pt (10D)	12pt (12D)	14pt (14D)
set:	8	9.75	11.75	14	16.5
line:	M.1220	M.1285	M.1318	M.1380	M.1495

display matrices:

size:	14pt	16pt	18pt	24pt	30pt	36pt	42pt	48pt	60pt	72pt
line:	T.1395	T.1610	T.1805	T.2433	T.2987	T.3608	T.4231	T.4853	T.6098	T.7308

- New Emerald Bible

610: New Emerald Bible

- New Face

606: New Face (cancelled in 1964)
607: New Face Bold (cancelled in 1964)
615: New Grotesque (cancelled in 1974) (apart from "A")
616: New Grotesque Bold (cancelled in 1974) (apart from "A")
666: New Grotesque Light (cancelled in 1967) (apart from "A")

- News Advertisements

229: News Advertisements (see: Newspaper Small Ads)

- Newspaper Small Ads

177: Newspaper Small Ads (cancelled in 1965)
229: Newspaper Small Ads (cancelled in 1965)

- Newspaper Smalls

115: Newspaper Smalls Roman (cancelled vóór 1966)

Available matrices: capitals, small capitals and lower case plus double large capitals and numbers.
These four alphabets could be cast in one machine-run, the double capitals overhanging at the bottom, relying on the "high-white" of neighbouring character. These high-blanks were cast from a blank matrix and adapted exactly under the overhanging characters.
composition matrices: UA.30 = 5.5-7pt

size:	5.5pt (6D)	6pt (6D)	7pt (7D)
set:	10	10.25	12.5

163: Newspaper Smalls (cancelled in 1967)
193: Newspaper Smalls (cancelled in 1965)
333: Newspaper Smalls (The Times) (see: Times Newspaper Smalls)
335: Newspaper Smalls (The Times) (see: Times Newspaper Smalls)

==== O ====
- Octavian

603 : Octavian Roman/italic

Design: about 1960 by Will Carter and David Kindersley. Used the first time in June 1961 for a text taken from the introduction to Stanley Morison's "The Typographic Book", intended for the members of the "Double Crown Club".
composition matrices: UA.485 = 14pt

size:	14pt (14D)
set:	11.75
line:	M.1500

- Old English text

456: Old English text frakture typeface

composition matrices: UA.318 = 8-12pt

size:	8pt (8D)	10pt (10D)	12pt (12D)
set:	8.75	10.25	12.25
line:	M.1321	M.1394	M.1470

display matrices:

size:	14pt	18pt	24pt	30pt	36pt	42pt	48pt	60pt	72pt
line:	T.155	T.1991	T.2660	T.3264	T.3984	T.4686	T.5368	T.6750	T.8090

356: Old English Text frakture typeface (cancelled in 1967)

composition matrices: UA.318 = 8-12pt

size:	8pt (8D)	10pt (10D)	12pt (12D)
set:	8.75	10.25	12.25
line:	M.1321	M.1394	M.1470

456: Old English Text Light (see: 456 Old English Text)

- Old Face

_43: Old Face (see: _43 Scotch Roman No. 3)
_46: Old Face (see: _46 Scotch Roman No. 1)
137: Old Face (see: 137 Scotch Roman No. 2)
154: Old Face (see: 154 Chiswell Old Face)
240: Old Face (cancelled in 1964)

composition matrices: UA.385 = 9pt

size:	9pt (9D)
set:	9
line:	M.1354

159: Old Face Heavy (see: 159 Old Style Bold No. 2)
_20: Old Face (Special) (cancelled in 1967)

UA.6, 6.5pt - 12 pt

size:	6.5pt (6D)	7pt (7D)	8pt (8D)	9pt (8D)	10pt (9D)	11pt (10D)	12pt
set:	6.5	6.5	7.25	8	8.75	9.75	11.25
line:	M.1196	M.1196	M.1220	M.1240	M.1260	M.1290	M.1350

_45: Old Face Standard (cancelled in 1967)

- Old Style

__2: Old Style No. 2 Roman/italic

UA.1: 6 tot 12 punt, UA.1a: 14pt

size:	6pt	7pt	8pt	9pt	10pt	11pt	12pt	14pt
set:	6.5	7.75	8.5	9.25	9.75	10.5	12	13.25
line:	M.1200	M.1230	M.1230	M.1250	M.1295	M.1315	M.1360	M.1405

151: Old Style No. 4 Roman/italic

composition matrices: UA.20 = 6-11pt, UA.20a = 12pt, UA.52 = 14pt

size:	6pt (6D)	7pt (7D)	8pt (8D)	9pt (8D)	10pt (10D)	11pt (10D)	12pt (11D)	13.5pt op 14pE (13D)
set:	6.5	7.5	8	8.75	9.5	10.5	11.75	13.5
line:	M.1220	M.1250	M.1250	M.1266	M.1294	M.1331	M.1360	M.1405

large composition: Roman = UA.133 italic = UA.358

18pt (18D) Roman/italic, 24Pt (24D) Roman

size:	18pt (18D)	24pt (24D)
set:	18	24
line:	T.1810	T.2364

display matrices:

size:	14pt	18pt	24pt	30pt	36pt
line:	T.1374	T.1810	T.2364	T.2918	T.3608

_67: Old Style Roman/italic (cancelled in 1967)

UA.1 = 9-12pt

size:	9pt	10pt	11pt	12pt
set:	8	9.5	10.25	12
line:	M.1260	M.1290	M.1320	M.1360

104: Old Style Roman/italic(cancelled in 1964)

UA.1 = 11pt

size:	11pt
set:	11.25
line:	M.1355

__3: Old Style Antique (see: __3 Antique Old Style)
124: Old Style Antique (see: 124 Antique Old Style)
161: Old Style Antique (see: 161 Antique Old Style)
232: Old Style Antique Italic (cancelled in 1965)
_53: Old Style Bold No. 1 Roman/italic

composition matrices: UA.3,3a: 53-12 italic, 53-14 & 18 : UA 100, 53-24: UA 101, italic: UA 76
Large composition matrices only available in roman.

corps:	5.5pt (6D)	6pt (6D)	6.5pt (6D)	7pt (7D)	8pt (7D)	9pt (8D)	10pt (9D)	11pt (10D)	12pt (12D)	14pt	18pt	24pt
set:	6.75	6.75	7.75	7.75	8.5	9.25	9.5	10.5	12	15.5	19.5	26
line:	.1202	.1202	.1250	.1250	.1235	.1257	.1291	.1315	.1364	.1533	.1948	.2640

Display-matrijzen:

corps:	14pt	18pt	22pt	24pt	30pt	36pt
line:	.1533	.1948	.2308	.2640	.3194	.3884

159: Old Style Bold No. 2 Roman

composition matrices: UA.32 = 8-12pt, UA.112 = 14pt

size:	8pt (8D)	10pt (9D)	12pt (12D)	14pt (14D)
set:	8.75	10.75	12.25	14
line:	M.1280	M.1414	M.1450	M.1533

large composition: UA.112

size:	14pt (14D)	18pt (18D)	24pt (24D)
set:	14	18	24
line:	T.1533	T.1948	T.2640

display matrices:

size:	14pt	18pt	22pt	24pt	30pt	36pt	42pt	48pt	60pt	72pt
line:	T.1533	T.1948	T.2308	T.2604	T.3194	T.3884	T.4576	T.5268	T.6651	T.7930

544: Old Style Bold No. 5 Roman

composition matrices: UA.2 = 6-12pt

size:	6pt (6D)	8pt (8D)	10pt (9D)	12pt (12D)
set:	6.5	8.5	9.75	12
line:	M.1200	M.1230	M.1295	M.1360

253: Old Style Bold (synonym: 253 Bold Face No. 2) (cancelled in 1967)

composition matrices: UA.3 = 8-9pt

size:	8pt (8D)	9pt (8D)
set:	8.5	9.25
line:	M.1285	M.1312

245: Old Style Bold Italic italic (synonym: 245 Bold Face Italic No. 2) (cancelled in 1967)

composition matrices: UA.76 = 8-12pt

size:	8pt (8D)	10pt (9D)	12pt (12D)
set:	8	10	12.25
line:	M.1308	M.1385	M.1474

176: Old Style Bold Outline Roman

composition matrices: UA.100 = 12pt

size:	12pt (12D)
set:	12.75
line:	M.1450

large composition: UA.100

size:	18pt
set:	19.5
line:	T.1948

display matrices:

size:	14pt	18pt	24pt
line:	T.1533	T.1948	T.2640

__8: Old Style Condensed Roman/italic (cancelled in 1967)

UA.1, = one size only: 10pt (9D) = 9 set, line.1295

size:	10pt (9D)
set:	9
line:	M.1295

_50: Old Style Condensed (cancelled in 1967)

composition matrices: UA.1 = 8-10pt

size:	8pt	9pt	10pt
set:	7.5	8.25	9
line:	M.1240	M.1265	M.1290

_55: Old Style Italic Display (see: 55 Gloucester Bold Italic)
122: Old Style (Prumyslava) Roman

- Onyx
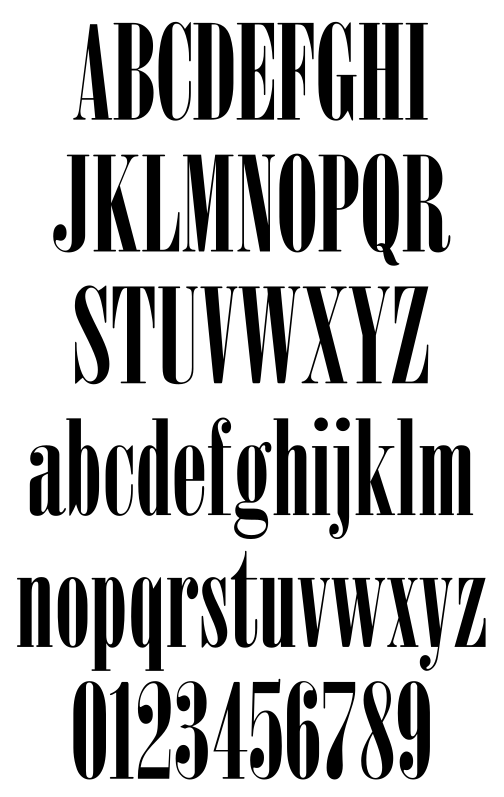

591: Onyx Roman
Onyx was created in 1937 and was inspired by the Stephanie typeface created by Bauer Type Foundry in 1870.

display matrices:

size:	14pt	18pt	24pt	30pt	36pt	42pt	48pt	60pt	72pt
line:	T.1533	T.1948	T.2640	T.3194	T.3884	T.4576	T.5268	T.6651	T.7930

Am 404): Onyx Roman

- Opus

652: Opus (cancelled in 1966)

- Othello

246: Othello Roman capitals

composition matrices: UA.85 = 10pt-12

size:	10pt (9D)	12pt (11D)
set:	12	14.5
line:	M.1620	M.1770

display matrices:

size:	14pt	18pt	24pt	30pt	36pt
line:	T.1868	T.2395	T.3200	T.3934	T.4804

248: Othello Shadow (cancelled in 1967)

- Outline

176: Outline (see: 176 Old Style Bold Outline)

==== P ====
- Palace script

429: Palace Script italic

Overhanging character that can only be cast with special moulds.
display matrices:

size:	14pt	18pt	24pt	30pt	36pt	42pt
line:	T.1434	T.1871	T.2422	T.3204	T.3554	T.4506

- Pastonchi

206: Pastonchi Roman/italic

composition matrices: UA.69 = 9-13 pt, UA.175 = 14D.

size:	9pt(8D)	10pt(9D)	11pt	13pt(12D)	14D (op 16pt)
set:	7.75	8.5	9.5	11.75	13.5
line:	M.1226	M.1248	M.1276	M.1338	M.1430

display matrices:

size:	14D op 16pt	16D op 18pt	20D op 22pt	24D op 30pt	30D op 36pt	36D op 36pt
line:	T.1430	T.1634	T.2044	T.2452	T.3085	T.3704

- Pegasus

508: Pegasus Roman

display matrices:

size:	16pt
line:	T.1677

- Pepita

613: Petita script

display matrices

size:	14D at 16pt	18D at 20pt	24D at 30pt	30D at 36pt	36D at 36pt	42D at 38pt	48D at 60pt	60D at 72pt
line:	T.1283	T.1642	T.2194	T.2825	T.3274	T.3829	T.4410	T.5520

- Perpetua

239: Perpetua Roman/italic

introduction: 1930, design: Eric Gill,
composition matrices UA.96 = 5.5pt - 18pt

size:	5.5pt	6pt	8pt	9pt	10pt (9D)	11pt (10D)	12pt (12D)	13pt (12D)	14pt (14D)
set:	7.5	7.25	8	8.5	9	10	11	11.75	13
line:	M.1205	M.1205	M.1221	M.1210	M.1212	M.1237	M.1260	M.1278	M.1380

large-composition matrices: 18pt(18D) 16.5 set line T.1635
display matrices:

size:	14pt	18pt	24pt	30pt	36pt	42pt	48pt	60pt	72pt
line:	T.1380	T.1635	T.2204	T.2744	T.3344	T.3926	T.4508	T.5683	T.6823

316: Perpetua No. 3 (cancelled in 1967)

registered design No. 751804,
composition matrices: UA.96 = 9pt

size:	9pt (9D)
set:	10.5
line:	M.1305

386: Perpetua No. 2 (cancelled in 1967)

composition matrices: UA.96 = 14pt

size:	14pt (14D)
set:	13
line:	M.1440

461: Perpetua Bold Roman/italic

composition matrices UA.379 = 6pt - 14pt

size:	5.5pt	6pt	8pt	9pt	10pt (9D)	11pt (10D)	12pt (12D)	13pt (12D)	14pt (14D)
set:	7.5	7.25	8	8.5	9	10	11	11.75	13
line:	M.1205	M.1205	M.1221	M.1210	M.1212	M.1237	M.1260	M.1278	M.1380

display matrices:

size:	14pt	18pt	24pt	30pt	36pt	42pt	48pt	60pt	72pt
line:	T.1380	T.1635	T.2204	T.2744	T.3344	T.3926	T.4508	T.5683	T.6823

200: Perpetua Bold Titling Roman

composition matrices: UA. 145 : 12pt(12D) = 11.25 set line.1753
display matrices:

size:	14pt	18pt	24pt	30pt	36pt	42pt	48pt	60pt	72pt
line:	T.1753	T.1848	T.2371	T.3894	T.4754	T.5606	T.6418	T.8060	T.9680

480: Perpetua Light Titling Roman

display matrices:

size:	14pt	18pt	24pt	30pt	36pt	42pt	48pt	60pt	72pt
line:	T.1730	T.2224	T.2970	T.3644	T.4444	T.5236	T.5998	T.7540	T.9050

561: Perpetua Semi-Bold (cancelled in 1963)
258: Perpetua Titling Roman

composition matrices: UA. 97 = 10pt - 12pt

size:	10pt (10D)	11pt (11D)	12pt (12D)
set:	10.5	11.5	12.5
line:	M.1546	M.1593	M.1652

display matrices:

size:	14pt	18pt	24pt	30pt	36pt	42pt	48pt	60pt	72pt
line:	T.1730	T.2219	T.2950	T.3644	T.4444	T.5236	T.5998	T.7540	T.9050

543: Perpetua Titling (cancelled in 1967)
480: Perpetua Titling Light Face (see: 480 Perpetua Light Titling)

- Pierre Didot

411: Pierre Didot (cancelled in 1965)

composition matrices: UA.375 = 9pt

size:	9D at 10pE
set:	10
line:	M.1234

- Pitman i.t.a.

453: Pitman's i.t.a. (see: Ehrhardt 453)
573: Pitman's i.t.a. (see: Ehrhardt Semi Bold 573)

- Placard

506: Placard Bold Condensed No. 1 Roman

composition matrices: UA.387 = 6D-12D

size:	6D at 7pE	7D at 8pE	8D at 9pE	10D at 11pE	12D at 13pE
set:	6	7	7.75	9.5	11.5
line:	M.1280	M.1330	M.1368	M.1450	M.1540

display matrices:

size:	14D at 16pE	16D at 18pE	20D at 22pE	24D at 30pE	28D at 30pE	36D at 36pE	42D at 48pE	48D at 60pE
line:	T.1728	T.1964	T.2478	T.2996	T.3442	T.4414	T.5179	T.5960

515: Placard Bold Condensed No. 2 Roman

display matrices:

size:	30pt	36pt	42pt	48pt	60pt
line:	T.3524	T.4299	T.5066	T.5808	T.7300

568: Placard Condensed Roman (synonym: 568 Placard Medium Condensed)

composition matrices: UA.387 = 6D-12D

size:	6D op 7pE	7D op 8pE	8D op 9pE	9D op 10pE	10D op 11pE	12D op 13pE
set:	5.5	6	6.5	7	7.5	8.75
line:	M.1327	M.1380	M.1436	M.1487	M.1543	M.1650

display matrices:

size:	14D at 16pE	16D at 18pE	20D at 22pE	24D at 30pE	28D at 30pE	36D at 36pE	42D at 48pE	48D at 60pE	60D at 72pE	72pt
line:	T.1806	T.2052	T.2544	T.3076	T.3592	T.4614	T.5409	T.6330	T.7800	T.8760

522: Placard Condensed Roman (see: 522 Placard Condensed Titling)
522: Placard Condensed Titling Roman (synonym: 522 Placard Condensed)

display matrices:

size:	72pt
line:	T.9700

505: Placard light Extra Condensed Roman

composition matrices: UA.387 = 10D

size:	10D op 11pE
set:	6
line:	M.1540

display matrices:

size:	14D at 16pE	16D at 18pE	20D at 22pE	24D at 30pE	28D at 30pE	36D at 36pE	42D at 48pE	48D at 60pE
line:	T.1860	T.2037	T.2674	T.3236	T.3722	T.4774	T.5589	T.6440

568: Placard Medium Condensed (see: 568 Placard Condensed)

- Plantin

110: Plantin Roman/italic

composition matrices: UA.4 = 5.5pt-12pt, UA.4a= 13.5pt, UA.363 = 14pt

pica:	5.5pt	6pt	6.5pt	7pt	7.5pt	7.5D	8pt	8pt	9pt	10pt	10pt	10pt	10pt	11pt	11pt	11pt	12pt	12pt	13.5pt	14pt
cast:	5.5pt	6pt	6.5pt	7pt	7.5pt	8pt	8pt	10pt	9pt	10pt	10pt	12pt	10pt	11pt	11pt	14pt	11pt	12pt	14pt	14pt
didot:	6D	6D	6D	7D	7D	7.5D	8D	10D	8D	9D	9D	11D	10D	10D	10D	14D	11D	11D	14D	14D
spec.				short desc.		short desc.	short desc.		long asc. & desc.	short desc.		long desc.	long asc. & desc.	short desc.		long asc. & desc.	short desc.			Large; Face
set:	7	7	7.75	7.75	8.5	9.25	8.5	8.5	9.25	9.5	9.5	9.5	9.5	10.25	10.25	10.25	11.75	11.75	13.25	14
line:	M.1237	M.1237	M.1257	M.1257	M.1285	M.1312	M.1285	M.1285	M.1312	M.1332	M.1332	M.1332	M.1332	M.1360	M.1360	M.1360	M.1415	M.1415	M.1465	M.1620

large composition matrices:

size:	18pt (18D)	18pt (18D)	24pt (24D)	24pt (24D)
	UA.106	UA.128	UA.107	UA.129
	Roman	italic	Roman	italic
set:	18	18	24	24
line:	T.1948	T.1948	T.2640	T.2640

display matrices:

size:	14pt	18pt	22pt	24pt	30pt	36pt	42pt	48pt	60pt	72pt
line:	T.1533	T.1948	T.2351	T.2640	T.3194	T.3884	T.4576	T.5268	T.6651	T.7930

194: Plantin Bold Roman/italic

can be combined with: 110 Plantin and 113/773 Plantin light
composition matrices: Roman UA.5 = 6pt-12pt, italic UA.3 = 6pt-12pt, UA.5a= 13.5pt, UA.158/159 = 14pt

pica:	6pt	6.5pt	7pt	7.5pt	8pt	9pt	10pt	11pt	12pt	13.5pt	14pt
cast:	6pt	6.5pt	7pt	7.5pt	8pt	9pt	10pt	11pt	12pt	14pt	14pt
didot:	6D	6D	7D	7D	8D	8D	9D	10D	11D	11D	14D
spec.		7pt short desc.		short desc.
set:	7	7.75	7.75	8.5	8.5	9.25	9.5	10.25	11.75	13.25	14
line:	M.1237	M.1257	M.1257	M.1285	M.1285	M.1312	M.1332	M.1360	M.1415	M.1465	M.1620

display matrices:

size:	14pt	18pt	22pt	24pt	30pt	36pt	42pt	48pt	60pt	72pt
line:	T.1533	T.1948	T.2351	T.2640	T.3194	T.3884	T.4576	T.5268	T.6651	T.7930

287: Plantin Bold (synonym: 287 Plantin Heavy No. 2) (cancelled in 1968)

composition matrices: UA.5 = 6.5pt-7.5pt

size:	6.5pt op 7pE	7.5pt op 8pE
set:	7	8
line:	M.1265	M.1308

236: Plantin Bold Condensed Roman/italic

composition matrices: UA.72 = 6pt-14pt

size:	6pt (6D)	6.5 at 7pE (6D)	8pt (8D)	9pt (8D)	10pt (9D)	11pt (10D)	12pt (12D)	13pt (12D)	14pt (14D)
set:	7	7.5	8.5	9.25	9.5	10.25	11.75	12.5	14
line:	M.1237	M.1252	M.1285	M.1312	M.1332	M.1360	M.1415	M.1442	M.1620

display matrices:

size:	14pt	18pt	22pt	24pt	30pt	36pt	42pt	48pt	60pt	72pt
line:	T.1533	T.1948	T.2351	T.2640	T.3194	T.3884	T.4576	T.5268	T.6651	T.7930

289: Plantin Condensed Roman/italic (cancelled in 1967)

composition matrices: UA.4 = 7.5ptt

size:	7.5pt op 8pE (7D)
set:	8
line:	M.1318

194: Plantin Heavy (see: 194 Plantin Bold)
236: Plantin Heavy Condensed (see: 236 Plantin Bold Condensed)
287: Plantin Heavy No. 2 (see: 287 Plantin Bold)
113: Plantin Light Roman/italic

composition matrices: UA.4 = 6pt-12pt

size:	6pt (6D)	7pt (7D)	8pt (8D)	9pt (8D)	10pt (9D)	11pt (10D)	12pt (12D)	12pt op 13pE
didot:	6D	7D	8D	8D	9D	10D	12D	12D long desc.
set:	7	7.75	8.5	9.25	10	10.75	11.75	11.75
line:	M.1237	M.1257	M.1285	.1312	M.1342	M.1370	M.1426	M.1426

large composition matrices:

size:	18pt (18D)	18pt (18D)	24pt (24D)	24pt (24D)
	UA.106	UA.128	UA.107	UA.129
	Roman	italic	Roman	italic
set:	18	18	24	24
line:	T.1948	T.1948	T.2640	T.2640

display matrices:

size:	14pt	18pt	24pt	30pt	36pt	42pt	48pt	60pt	72pt
line:	T.1533	T.1948	T.2640	T.3194	T.3884	T.4576	T.5268	T.6651	T.7930

773: Plantin Light Roman/italic
113: Plantin Light Face (see: 113 Plantin Light)

composition matrices: UA.4 = 10pt-11pt
The two sizes of Series 773 are alternatives for Series 113, with identical set and lining', for use in combination with Series 194 and 663. Other sizes of Series 113 comply with this.

size:	10pt (9D)	11pt (10D)
set:	9.5	10.25
line:	M.1322	M.1360

281: Plantin Old Style No. 2 (cancelled in 1967)

composition matrices: UA.305 = 9pt-11pt

size:	9pt (8D)	11pt (10D)
set:	9.5	11.25
line:	M.1330	M.1400

663: Plantin Semi Bold Roman/italic

composition matrices: Roman=UA.5, italic= UA.3, 6pt-12pt

size:	6pt (6D)	7pt (7D)	8pt (8D)	9pt (8D)	10pt (9D)	11pt (10D)	12pt (12D)
set:	7	7.75	8.5	9.25	9.5	10.75	11.75
line:	M.1237	M.1257	M.1285	M.1312	M.1332	M.1360	M.1414

438: Plantin Titling Roman

display matrices:

size:	72pt
line:	T.9640

- Plate Gothic

139: Plate Gothic (see: 139 Spartan Light)
140: Plate Gothic (see: 140 Spartan)
141: Plate Gothic (see: 141 Spartan Bold)
142: Plate Gothic (see: 142 Spartan Light Condensed)
143: Plate Gothic (see: 143 Spartan Condensed)
145: Plate Gothic (see: 145 Spartan Wide)
144: Plate Gothic Italic (see: 144 Spartan Italic)

- Poliphilus

170: Poliphilus Roman

composition matrices: UA.53: 10pt - 13pt, for the italic see: 119 Blado Italic

size:	10pt (9D)	11pt (10D)	12pt (12D)	13pt (12D)
set:	8.5	9.25	10.75	11.5
line:	M.1299	M.1326	M.1374	M.1399

large-composition matrices: 16pt = UA.139

size:	16pt
set:	13.5
line:	T.1577

display matrices:

size:	24pt
line:	T.2352

230: Poliphilus Titling Roman

display matrices in 2 sizes

size:	18pt	24pt
line:	T.2359	T.3192

- Poltawski

394, Poltawski Roman

composition matrices: UA.156: 6D, 8D, 10D, 12D

size:	6D at 7pica	8D at 9 pica	10D at 11pica	12D at 13pica
set:	6.5	8.5	10.75	13
line:	M.1206	M.1275	M.1337	M.1405

398: Poltawski Bold Roman

composition matrices: UA.156: 6D, 8D, 10D, 12D

size:	6D at 7pica	8D at 9 pica	10D at 11pica	12D at 13pica
set:	6.5	8.5	10.75	13
line:	M.1206	M.1275	M.1337	M.1405

- Prayer Bookface

532: Prayer Book Face (OUP) (cancelled)

==== R ====
- Rockwell

371: Rockwell Roman/italic

composition matrices: UA.338 = 6-14pt:

size:	6pt (6D)	7D at 8pE	8pt (8D)	9pt (9D)	10pt (10D)	12pt (12D)	14pt (14D)
set:	6.75	8	9.5	10.75	12.5	15.75
line:	M.1220	M.1256	M.1275	M.1307	M.1340	M.1400	M.1624

display matrices:

size:	14pt	18pt	22pt	24pt	30pt	36pt	42pt	48pt	60pt	72pt
line:	T.1533	T.1948	T.2392	T.2640	T.3194	T.3884	T.4576	T.5268	T.6651	T.7930

391: Rockwell Bold Roman/italic

composition matrices: UA.338 = 6-14pt, combines with: 371 Rockwell

size:	6pt (6D)	7D at 8pE	8pt (8D)	9pt (9D)	10pt (10D)	12pt (12D)	14pt (14D)
set:	6.75	8	8.5	9.5	10.75	12.5	15.75
line:	M.1220	M.1256	M.1275	M.1307	M.1340	M.1400	M.1624

display matrices:

size:	14pt	18pt	22pt	24pt	30pt	36pt	42pt	48pt	60pt	72pt
line:	T.1533	T.1948	T.2392	T.2640	T.3194	T.3884	T.4576	T.5268	T.6651	T.7930

359: Rockwell Bold Condensed Roman

composition matrices: UA.411 = 11pt

size:	11pt (10D)	11pt (11D)
except.	short desc.
set:	11.75	11.75
line:	M.1376	M.1376

display matrices:

size:	14pt	18pt	24pt	30pt	36pt	42pt	48pt	60pt	72pt
line:	T.1533	T.1948	T.2640	T.3194	T.3884	T.4576	T.5268	T.6651	T.7930

414: Rockwell Condensed Roman

display matrices:

size:	14pt	18pt	24pt	30pt	36pt	42pt	48pt	60pt	72pt
line:	T.1533	T.1948	T.2640	T.3194	T.3884	T.4576	T.5268	T.6651	T.7930

424: Rockwell Extra Bold Roman

composition matrices: UA.162 = 6-12pt

size:	6pt (6D)	8pt (8D)	10pt (10D)	12pt (12D)
set:	6.75	8.5	10.75	12.5
line:	M.1220	M.1275	M.1340	M.1400

display matrices:

size:	14pt	18pt	24pt	30pt	36pt	42pt	48pt	60pt	72pt
line:	T.1533	T.1948	T.2640	T.3194	T.3884	T.4576	T.5268	T.6651	T.7930

424: Rockwell Extra Heavy (see: 424 Rockwell Extra Bold)
391: Rockwell Heavy (see: 391 Rockwell Bold)
359: Rockwell Heavy Condensed (see: 359 Rockwell Bold Condensed)
390: Rockwell Light Roman/italic

composition matrices: UA.338 = 6-14pt

size:	6pt (6D)	7D op 8pE	8pt (8D)	9pt (9D)	10pt (10D)	12pt (12D)	14pt (14D)
set:	6.75	8	8.5	9.5	10.75	12.5	15.75
line:	M.1220	M.1256	M.1275	M.1307	M.1340	M.1400	M.1624

display matrices:

size:	14pt	18pt	24pt	30pt	36pt	42pt	48pt	60pt	72pt
line:	T.1533	T.1948	T.2640	T.3194	T.3884	T.4576	T.5268	T.6651	T.7930

582: Rockwell Light Condensed (Film Sub-titles) Roman/italic
175: Rockwell Shadow Roman

display matrices:

size:	18pt	24pt	30pt	36pt	42pt	48pt	60pt	72pt
line:	T.2363	T.3144	T.3864	T.4724	T.5566	T.6368	T.8000	T.9600

175: Rockwell Shadow Titling (see: Rockwell Shadow)

- Romulus

458: Romulus Roman/italic

Jan van Krimpen started in 1931 with the design of this typeface, which eventually led to a whole font family. With the permission of the firm Enschede & Sons in Haarlem, "Series 458" was cut in 1936. It was a contemporary font that combined characteristics of many old fonts. The colour is matched to antique characters, but the serifs are almost horizontal and vertical. The font runs quite wide and the color is fairly light. The italic is an experiment: the oblique Roman is of the same width as the Roman.
composition matrices: UA.405 = 8D-14D

size:	8Dpt op 9pE	9D op 10pE	10D op 11pE	12D op 13pE	14D op 16pE
set:	7.75	8.5	9	10.75	12.75
line:	M.1225	M.1245	M.1264	M.1320	M.1478

large composition: UA.406

size:	16D op 18pE	20D op 14pE
set:	16.5	20.5
line:	T.1602	T.1994

display matrices:

size:	24D at 30pE	28D at 30pE	36D at 36pE	48D at 60pE	60D at 72pE
line:	T.2404	T.2812	T.3584	T.4810	T.6030

520: Romulus Bold Roman/italic (synonym: 520 Van Krimpen Bold)

composition matrices: UA.405 = 8D-14D

size:	8Dpt at 9pE	9D at 10pE	10D at 11pE	12D at 13pE	14D at 16pE
set:	7.75	8.5	9	10.75	12.75
line:	M.1225	M.1245	M.1264	M.1320	M.1478

- Ronaldson

_10: Ronaldson Roman/italic

composition matrices: UA-1 (6-12pt) (synonym: Ronaldson Old style)

size:	6pt (6D)	7pt (7D)	8pt (8D)	9pt (8D)	10pt (9D)	11pt (10D)	12pt (12D)
set:	6.75	7.75	8.5	9.25	9.75	10.5	12
line:	M.1200	M.1230	M.1230	M.1250	M.1295	M.1315	M.1360

_10: Ronaldson Old Style (see: Ronaldson)

- Runic Condensed

420 : Runic Condensed Roman

==== S ====
- Sabon

This font was designed by Jan Tschichold. Characters for hand composing can (still) be ordered from the company D. Stempel AG (foundry) in formerly Frankfurt (now Darmstadt); Linotype matrices were available at Linotype GmbH (Berlin and Frankfurt); and Monotype matrices could be ordered from the Monotype Setzmachinen-Fabrik GMbH (Frankfurt and Berlin). This can still be done at the Type Museum in London, because the "patterns" and punches and production archives survived there.

The shape of the letter was identical for all three systems. Hand-composing type could be mixed with Linotype and Monotype composition rules. The letter had a limited success. There was also criticism: the letter suffered from the combined disadvantages of the three systems. For example: the Roman and italic faces are as wide as those on a Linotype matrix when combined. And Jan van Krimpen had objections to what he considered the too rigid unit-system of Monotype.

669: Sabon Roman/italic

composition matrices: UA.503 8D-12D

size:	6D at 7pE	8D at 9pE	9D at 10pE	10D at 11pE	12D at 13pE
set:	6.75	8.5	9.25	10.25	12.25
line:	M.1237	M.1308	M.1383	M.1383	M.1459

693: Sabon Semi-Bold Roman

composition matrices: UA.503 8D-12D

size:	6D at 7pE	8D at 9pE	9D at 10pE	10D at 11pE	12D at 13pE
set:	6.75	8.5	9.25	10.25	12.25
line:	M.1237	M.1308	M.1383	M.1383	M.1459

- Sachsenwald Mager

499: Sachsenwald Mager (cancelled in 1965)

- Sans Serif

_15: Sans-Serif (see: 15 Grotesque Bold Condensed No. 2)
_81: Sans-Serif (see: 81 Grotesque Bold Condensed)
267: Sans-Serif (cancelled in 1965)
318: Sans-Serif Condensed (see: 318 Grotesque Condensed)

- Schmale Nürnburger Gotisch

186: Schmale Nürnburger Gotisch fraktuur (cancelled in 1965)

display matrices in 6 sizes

size:	14D	18D	20D	24D	28D	36D
line:	T.1671	T.2054	T.2560	T.3052	T.3524	T.4574

- Schoeffer

_22: Schoeffer (cancelled in 1964)

composition matrices UA.2, 8pt, 10pt, 12 pt

size:	8pt (8D)	10pt (9D)	12pt (12D)
set:	8	9.25	11.25
line:	M.1270	M.1310	M.1378

- Schurmann Antiqua Halbfette

_52: Schurmann Antiqua Halbfette Roman (synonym: 52 Modern Mediaeval (Half-Fat) (cancelled in 1967)

- Scotch Roman

_46: Scotch Roman Roman/italic

composition matrices: UA.1 = 6-12pt

size:	6pt at 5.5pE	6pt	7pt	7D at 8pE	8pt	9pt at 8pE	9pt	10pt	11pt	12pt
didot:	6D	6D	7D	7D	8D	8D	8D	9D	10D	12D
bijz.	short desc.					short desc.
set:	7	7	8	8.5	8.5	9.25	9.25	10	10.75	12.25
line:	M.1220	M.1220	M.1250	M.1235	M.1235	M.1257	M.1257	M.1290	M.1320	M.1360

137: Scotch Roman Roman/italic

composition matrices: 8-12pt

size:	8pt (8D)	9pt (8D)	10pt (9D)	11pt (10D)	12pt (11D)
UA.	13	14	15	16	17
set:	8.25	8.5	9.25	10.25	12.25
line:	M.1260	M.1262	M.12603	M.1285	M.1362

large composition: UA.144 = Roman, UA.151 = italic

size:	14pt (14D)	18pt (18D)	24pt (24D)
special feature			no italic available
set:	13.5	17	23
line:	T.1395	T.1810	T.2364

display matrices:

size:	14pt	18pt	24pt	30pt	36pt	42pt	48pt
line:	T.1395	T.1810	T.2364	T.2918	T.3608	T.4300	T.4854

- Script

322: Script (see: 322 Script Bold)
574: Script Ashley (see: 574 Ashley Script)
322: Script Bold script

display matrices:

size:	14pt	18pt	24pt	30pt	36pt	42pt	48pt	60pt	72pt
line:	T.1452	T.1863	T.2488	T.3054	T.3724	T.4376	T.4968	T.6300	T.7560

436: Script Dorchester (see: 436 Dorchester Script)
493: Script Grosvenor (see: 493 Grosvenor Script)
475: Script Light

display matrices:

size:	24pt
line:	T.2488

351: Script Monoline (see: 351 Monoline Script)
429: Script Palace (see: 429 Palace Script)
455: Script Temple (see: 455 Temple Script)
385: Script Wenceslas (see: 385 Wenceslas Script) (cancelled in 196?)

- Shadow French

434: Shadow French (cancelled)

- Shakespeare Titling

234: Shakespeare Titling (cancelled in 1967)

display matrices:

size:	36pt
line:	T.4434

- Sheldon

552: Sheldon

- Solus

276: Solus Roman (cancelled in 1967)

composition matrices: UA.320 = 12pt-14pt

size:	12pt (12D)	14pt (14D)
set:	11	13
line:	M.1310	M.1437

display matrices:

size:	18pt	48pt
line:	T.1841	T.4982

368: Solus Bold Roman (cancelled in 1967)

composition matrices: UA.320 = 12pt-14pt

size:	11pt (10D)
set:	11.5
line:	M.1375

368: Solus Heavy (see: Solus Bold)

- Spartan

Imitation of stone inscriptions of chopped capitals: the font contains only capital letters, numbers, and punctuation. Each size has of the capitals four sizes, which can be combined, with the little ones functioning as lower case.

140: Spartan Roman

composition matrices: UA.16 = 6-12pt

size:	6pt (6D)	12pt (12D)
set:	7	11
line:	M.1282	M.1420

large composition: UA.157 = 24pt

size:	24pt (24D)	24pt (24D)
sizes:	4 and 5	2 and 3
set:	19.5	26
line:	T.3060	T.3060

display matrices:

size:	24pt
line:	T.3060

141: Spartan Bold Roman

composition matrices: UA.18 = 6-12pt

size:	6pt (6D)	12pt (12D)
set:	7	11
line:	M.1282	M.1420

display matrices:

size:	24pt
line:	T.3060

143: Spartan Condensed Roman

composition matrices: UA.18 = 6-12pt

size:	6pt (6D)	12pt (12D)
set:	5	9
line:	M.1282	M.1420

144: Spartan Italic italic

composition matrices: UA.18 = 6-12pt

size:	6pt (6D)	12pt (12D)
set:	7	12
line:	M.1240	M.1420

139: Spartan Light Roman

composition matrices: UA.18 = 6-12pt

size:	6pt (6D)	12pt (12D)
set:	7	12
line:	M.1282	M.1420

display matrices:

size:	24pt
line:	T.3060

142: Spartan Light Condensed Roman

composition matrices: UA.18 = 6-12pt

size:	6pt (6D)	12pt (12D)
set:	7	9
line:	M.1282	M.1420

145: Spartan Wide Roman

composition matrices: UA.18 = 6-12pt

size:	6pt (6D)	12pt (12D)
set:	8.5	12.75
line:	M.1282	M.1420

- Spectrum

556: Spectrum Roman/italic

This font designed by Jan van Krimpen was originally intended for printing a Bible at the Spectrum publishing house in Utrecht (Netherlands). The project was cancelled. Nevertheless, the font was rather successful. Therefore, in collaboration with Enschede & Sons it was decided to cut the complete series. The font is open and seems fairly robust. The character produces a fairly compact composition.
composition matrices: UA. 428 = 6D-12D

size:	6D at 7pE	8D at 9pE	10D at 11pE	12D at 13pE
set:	6.25	7.5	8.75	10.25
line:	M.1215	M.1250	M.1297	M.1350

display matrices:

size:	14D at 16pE	16D at 18pE	20D at 24pE	24D at 30pE	28D at 30pE	36D at 36pE	48D at 60pE	60D at 72pE
line:	T.1454	T.1656	T.2060	T.2483	T.2912	T.3714	T.5000	T.6270

- Surrey Old Style

196: Surrey Old Style Roman (cancelled in 1967)

display matrices:

size:	14pt	18pt	24pt	30pt	36pt
line:	T.1533	T.1948	T.2640	T.3194	T.3884

- Swing Bold

583: Swing Bold script

display matrices:

size:	14pt	18pt	24pt	30pt	36pt
line:	T.1301	T.1668	T.2229	T.2724	T.3324

==== T ====
- Temple Script

455: Temple Script

composition matrices: UA.386 = 10D-12D

size:	10D at 11pE	12D at 13pE
set:	9.25	11.25
line:	M.1453	M.1549

display matrices:

size:	14D at 16pE	16D at 18pE	20D at 22pE	24D at 30pE	28D at 30pE	36D at 36pE	48D at 60pE	60D at 72pE	72pt
line:	T.1684	T.1916	T.2378	T.2874	T.3362	T.4304	T.5810	T.7280	T.8170

- The Times

355: The Times Hever Titling Roman (synonym: 355 Times Hever Titling)

composition matrices: UA.323 = 9pt-12pt

size:	9pt (9D)	10pt (10D)	11pt (11D)	12pt (12D)
set:	9	10	11	12
line:	M.1320	M.1357	M.1391	M.1430

display matrices:

size:	14pt	18pt	24pt	30pt
line:	T.1510	T.1887	T.2502	T.3056

- Times

334: Times Bold Roman/italic

to be used in combination with Times New Roman Series 327
composition matrices: Roman = UA.324, italic = UA 325, 5.5pt-14pt
matrices for long-descenders are available in several sizes

size:	5.5pt	6pt	6pt	6D	6.5pt	7pt	7pt	7.5pt	7.5pt	8pt	8pt	9pt	9pt	10pt	10pt	11pt	11pt	12pt	12pt	14pt
op:	5.5pE	6pE	6.5pE	7pE	6.5pE	7pE	7.5pE	7.5pE	8pE	8pE	9pE	9pE	10pE	10pE	11pE	11pE	12pE	12pE	14pE	14pE
didot:	5D	6D	6D	6D	6D	7D)	7D	7D	8D)	8D	9D)	8D	10D	10D	11D	10D	12D	12D	14D	14D
special features			long. desc.	7pt short desc.		long desc.			long desc.		long desc.		long desc.		long desc.		long desc.		long desc.
set:	6.5	6.75	6.75	7.75	7.25	7.75	7.75	8.25	8.25	8.25	8.25	9	9	9.75	9.75	10.25	10.25	12	12	12.75
line:	M.1239	M.1239	M.1239	M.1268	M.1250	M.1268	M.1268	M.1286	M.1286	M.1298	M.1298	M.1325	M.1325	M.1338	M.1338	M.1368	M.1368	M.1420	M.1420	M.1470

display matrices:

size:	14pt	16pt	18pt	20pt	22pt	24pt	30pt	36pt	42pt	48pt	60pt	72pt
line:	T.1458	T.1672	T.1873	T.2150	T.2363	T.2640	T.3194	T.3884	T.4576	T.5268	T.6651	T.7930

345: Times Bold No. 2 Roman (see also: 360 Times Bold)

composition matrices: UA.324 = 5pt-6pt

size:	7pt (7D)	9pt (8D)	11pt (10D)	12pt (12D)
set:	7.75	9	10.5	12
line:	M.1268	M.1325	M.1368	M.1420

360: Times Bold Roman

composition matrices: UA.324 = 5pt-6pt

size:	5pt (5D)	6pt (6D)
set:	6.25	6.75
line:	M.1210	M.1239

328: Times Bold Titling No. 2 Roman

composition matrices: UA.324 = 5pt-6pt

size:	8pt (8D)	9pt (8D)	10pt (10D)	11pt (10D)	12pt (12D)
set:	9.25	10.25	10.25	11.5	13
line:	M.1360	M.1382	M.1410	M.1440	M.1500

display matrices:

size:	14pt	18pt	24pt	30pt	36pt	42pt	48pt	60pt	72pt
line:	T.1671	T.1948	T.2640	T.3194	T.3884	T.4576	T.5248	T.6651	T.7930

332: Times Bold Titling Roman

display matrices:

size:	18pt	24pt	30pt	36pt	48pt	60pt	72pt
line:	T.1948	T.2640	T.3194	T.3884	T.5248	T.6651	T.7930

639: Times Cosmoli Titling (cancelled in 1966)
339: Times Extended Titling Roman

composition matrices: UA.327 = 7pt-14pt

size:	7pt (7D)	8pt (8D)	9pt (8D)	10pt (10D)	11pt (10D)	12pt (12D)	14pt (14D)
set:	8.5	9.5	10.25	11	11.75	13.25	17
line:	M.1356	M.1360	M.1376	M.1410	M.1440	M.1500	M.1738

display matrices:

size:	14pt	16pt	18pt	24pt	30pt	36pt	42pt	48pt	60pt	72pt
line:	T.1671	T.1921	T.2224	T.2534	T.2918	T.3714	T.4406	T.5008	T.6235	T.7515

569: Times Four-line Mathematics
355: Times Hever Titling (see:355 The Times Hever Titling)
333: Times Newspaper Smalls
335: Times Newspaper Smalls
329: Times Titling Roman

composition matrices: UA.328 = 14pt

size:	14pt (14D)
set:	15.75
line:	M.1500

display matrices:

size:	14pt	16pt	18pt	24pt	30pt	36pt
line:	T.1533	T.1707	T.1948	T.2640	T.3194	T.3884

358: Times Titling (cancelled in 1967)

- Times New Roman

327: Times New Roman Roman/italic
421: Times New Roman Semi-bold Roman/italic

composition matrices: UA.325 = 7pt-14pt

size:	6pt (6D)	6.5pt (6D)	7pt (7D)	8pt (8D)	9pt (8D)	10pt (10D)	11pt (11D)	12pt (12D)	14pt (14D)
set:	7	7.5	8.25	9	9.75	10.75	11.75	12.75	14.5
line:	M.1245	M.1265	M.1291	M.1310	M.1300	M.1329	M.1358	M.1395	M.1600

display matrices:

size:	14pt	18pt	24pt	36pt	48pt	60pt	72pt
line:	T.1533	T.1948	T.2640	T.3884	T.5268	T.6651	T.7930

427: Times New Roman Wide Roman/italic
627: Times New Roman Book Roman/italic

Series 627 consist of the special "long-descender" characters and the normal "non-descender" characters of Series 427
composition matrices: UA.327 = 7pt-14pt

size:	7.5pt (7D)	10pt (10D)	11pt (11D)	12pt (12D)	14pt (14D)	14D op 16pE
set:	7.75	9	10.25	11.25	12.25	13.25
line:	M.1267	M.1328	M.1370	M.1405	M.1438	M.1450

large composition: UA.426, 14pt only Roman

size:	24pt (24D)
set:	21.5
line:	T.2230

display matrices:

size:	20pt	24pt
line:	T.1827	T.2230

474: Times New Roman Heavy Book (destroyed in a bombardment)
727: Times New Roman (Light Caps) Roman
827: Times New Roman (French) Roman/italic (see: Times New Roman 727)

alternative matrices for:

small capitals and Roman capitals C G Q R Ç
italic capitals C Q R and lower case g and k

composition matrices: UA.325 = 6pt-12pt

size:	6pt (6D)	7pt (7D)	8pt (8D)	9pt (9D)	10pt (10D)	11pt (10D)	12pt (12D)
set:	6.75	7.75	8.25	9	9.75	10.5	12
line:	M.1230	M.1268	M.1298	M.1325	M.1338	M.1368	M.1420

- Titling

179: Titling (see: 179 Modern Titling)

synonyms: 179 Titling Modern No. 1, 179 Titling Italic

180: Titling (see: 180 Victoria Bold Condensed Titling) (synonym: 180 Victoria Bold Condensed)
181: Titling (see: 181 Victoria Condensed Titling)
182: Titling (see: 182 Victoria Titling)
183: Titling (see: 183 Modern)
209: Titling (see: 209 Caslon Titling)
234: Titling (see: 234 Shakespeare Titling)
440: Titling (cancelled in 1965)
522: Titling (see: 522 Placard Condensed Titling)
332: Titling Bold (The Times) (see: 332 Times Bold Titling)
__H: Titling (Caps) Roman
180: Titling Condensed (see: 180 Victoria Bold Condensed Titling)
339: Titling Extended (The Times) (see: 339 Times Extended Titling)
328: Titling Heavy (The Times) (see: 328 Times Bold Titling)
355: Titling Hever (The Times) (see: 355 Times Hever Titling)
179: Titling Italic (cancelled before 1966) (see: 179 Modern Titling)

synonyms: 179 Titling 179 Modern Titling No. 1

179: Titling Modern No. 1 (see: 179 Modern Titling)

synonyms: 179 Titling, 179 Titling Italic

329: Titling (The Times) (see: 329 Times Titling)

- Tonic-Sol-Fa

325; Tonic-Sol-Fa

- Traveller

629: Traveller Roman

display matrices:

size:	30pt	36pt	42pt	48pt	60pt	72pt
line:	T.2918	T.3538	T.4161	T.4715	T.5960	T.7100

- Treyford

226: Treyford

- Trojan

114: Trojan Roman (cancelled in 1967)

composition matrices: UA.81 = 9pt-11pt

size:	9pt (8D)	11pt (10D)
set:	9.5	11.25
line:	M.1306	M.1370

display matrices:

size:	14pt	18pt	24pt	36pt
line:	T.1502	T.1929	T.2576	T.3854

- Typewriter

Typewriter is a general style of fonts. All characters are of the same width, or "monospaced"; they are cast with a "flat" wedge. Consequently, all the typewriter font characters are cast with the same die case layout, key banks and wedge. There was more than enough space for all the underlined characters in the die case as well.
Printers used these fonts to print mailings for large companies. The print was made to look like a hand-typed personal letter. The press was covered with previously used, worn paper combined with a thin cloth silk tissue. In this way, the type did not receive equal pressure and ink on the paper. Thus it appeared that the letter was typed by a somewhat inexperienced secretary.

_82: Typewriter No. 1 Roman

composition matrices: UA.28 = 10pt-12pt

Series:	82	100	105	235	301	302	344
size:	10pt (9D)	12pt (11D)	12pt (12D)	12pt(11D)	10pt (10D)	12pt (11D)	12pt (12D)
set:	12	14.5	14.5	13.25	12	14.5	14.5
line:	M.1291	M.1364	M.1550	T.1302	M.1291	M.1364	M.1355

100: Typewriter No. 2 Roman (see: 100 Typewriter 82)
105: Typewriter No. 3 Roman (see: 105 Typewriter 82)
127: Typewriter No. 4 Roman

composition matrices: UA.28 = 8pt-12pt

size:	8pt (8D)	10pt (9D)	12pt (12D)
set:	10	12	14.5
line:	M.1270	M.1296	M.1364

235: Typewriter No. 5 Elite Roman (see: 235 Typewriter 82)
301: Typewriter No. 6 Elite Roman (see: 301 Typewriter 82)
602: Typewriter IBM "Executive" Roman

This font is an exception to the rule: it has character of different widths, "unit values". Therefore, a special wedge was needed to cast it. The keyboard also needed additional equipment: the key bars, a kind of mechanical arrangement to translate the keystrokes on the keyboard into the punches in the ribbon. For the print shop it was a very expensive font to purchase.
Underlined character were cast at 12 pt, with a 2pt wide stripe (Rule R39 2pt)
composition matrices: UA.442 = 14pt

size:	14pt (13D)
set:	13.5
line:	M.1475

_82: Typewriter Underlined Roman
100: Typewriter Underlined Roman
105: Typewriter Underlined Roman

==== U ====
- Ultra Bodoni

120: Ultra Bodoni (see: 120 Bodoni Ultra Bold)

- Univers

Univers was developed in cooperation with the French type foundry Deberny & Peignot.
It was possible to cast characters in lining with the character bought in France.

693: Univers Bold Roman/italic

composition matrices: UA.486 = 5D-12D, extra &: S16511, S16512, superior: L225,

size:	5D at 6pE	6D at 7pE	7D at 8pE	8D at 9pE	8.5D at 9pE	9D at 10pE	10D at 11pE	11D at 12pE	12D at 13pE
set:	7	7.75	8.75	9.5	10.5	11.25	13	14	15
line:	M.1220	M.1234	M.1265	M.1290	M.1320	M.1350	M.1408	M.1436	M.1468

display matrices:

size:	14D at 16pE	16D at 18pE	18D at 20pE	22D at 24pE	28D at 30pE	36D at 36pE	48D at 60pE
line:	T.1587	T.1818	T.2048	T.2538	T.3252	T.4024	T.5420

694: Univers Bold Condensed Roman/italic
692: Univers Bold Expanded Roman

composition matrices: UA.491 = 6D-10D, extra &: S16511, superior: L228,

size:	6D at 7pE	8D at 9pE	8.5D at 9pE	9D at 10pE	10D at 11pE
set:	9.5	11.75	13.75	16
line:	M.1234	M.1290	M.1350	M.1408

display matrices:

size:	12D at 13pE	14D at 16pE	16D at 18pE	18D at 20pE	22D at 24pE	28D at 30pE	36D at 36pE	48D at 60pE
line:	T.1356	T.1587	T.1818	T.2048	T.2538	T.3252	T.4024	T.5420

696: Univers Extra Bold Roman

composition matrices: UA.484 = 5D-12D, extra &: S16511, S16512, superior: L223, inferior: L255

size:	5D at 6pE	6D at 7pE	7D at 8pE	8D at 9pE	8.5D at 9pE	9D at 10pE	10D at 11pE	11D at 12pE	12D at 13pE
set:	7	7.75	8.75	9.5	10.5	11.25	13	14	15
line:	M.1220	M.1234	M.1265	M.1290	M.1320	M.1350	M.1408	M.1436	M.1468

display matrices:

size:	14D at 16pE	16D at 18pE	18D at 20pE	22D at 24pE	28D at 30pE	36D at 36pE	48D at 60pE
line:	T.1587	T.1818	T.2048	T.2538	T.3252	T.4024	T.5420

695: Univers Extra Bold Expanded Roman/italic

composition matrices: UA.491 = 6D-10D, extra &: S16511, superiors: L268,

size:	6D at 7pE	8D at 9pE	8.5D at 9pE	9D at 10pE	10D at 11pE
set:	9.5	11.75	13.75	16
line:	M.1234	M.1290	M.1350	M.1408

display matrices:

size:	12D at 13pE	14D at 16pE	16D at 18pE	18D at 20pE	22D at 24pE	28D at 30pE	36D at 36pE	48D at 60pE
line:	T.1356	T.1587	T.1818	T.2048	T.2538	T.3252	T.4024	T.5420

684: Univers Extra Light Extra Condensed Roman/italic

display matrices: extra &: S16511, superior: L292,

size:	18D at 20pE	22D at 24pE	28D at 30pE	36D at 36pE	48D at 60pE
line:	T.2048	T.2538	T.3252	T.4024	T.5420

685: Univers Light Roman/italic

composition matrices: UA.483 = 6D-12D, extra &: S16511, S16512, superior: L295,

size:	6D at 7pE	7D at 8pE	8D at 9pE	8.5D at 9pE	9D at 10pE	10D at 11pE	11D at 12pE	12D at 13pE
set:	7.75	8.75	9.5	10.5	11.25	13	14	15
line:	M.1234	M.1265	M.1290	M.1320	M.1350	M.1408	M.1436	M.1468

display matrices:

size:	14D at 16pE	16D at 18pE	18D at 20pE	22D at 24pE	28D at 30pE	36D at 36pE	48D at 60pE
line:	T.1587	T.1818	T.2048	T.2538	T.3252	T.4024	T.5420

686: Univers Light Condensed Roman/italic

composition matrices: UA.492 = 5D-12D, extra &: S16511, S16512, superiors: L250,

size:	5D at 6pE	6D at 7pE	7D at 8pE	8D at 9pE	8.5D at 9pE	9D at 10pE	10D at 11pE	11D at 12pE	12D at 13pE
set:	5.5	6	6.75	7.25	8	8.5	9.75	10.5	11.25
line:	M.1220	M.1234	M.1265	M.1290	M.1320	M.1350	M.1408	M.1436	M.1468

display matrices:

size:	14D at 16pE	16D at 18pE	18D at 20pE	22D at 24pE	28D at 30pE	36D at 36pE	48D at 60pE
line:	T.1587	T.1818	T.2048	T.2538	T.3252	T.4024	T.5420

687: Univers Light Extra Condensed Roman/italic

composition matrices: UA.501 = 10D-12D, extra &: S16511, superior: L292,

size:	10D at 11pE	12D at 13pE
set:	7	8
line:	M.1408	M.1468

display matrices:

size:	14D at 16pE	18D at 20pE	22D at 24pE	28D at 30pE	36D at 36pE	48D at 60pE
line:	T.1587	T.2048	T.2538	T.3252	T.4024	T.5420

689: Univers Medium Roman/italic

composition matrices: UA.483 = 5D-12D, extra &: S16511, S16512, superiors: L222, inferiors: L254

size:	5D at 6pE	6D at 7pE	7D at 8pE	8D at 9pE	8.5D at 9pE	10D at 11pE	11D at 12pE	12D at 13pE
set:	7	7.75	8.75	9.5	10.5	13	14	15
line:	M.1220	M.1234	M.1265	M.1290	M.1320	M.1408	M.1436	M.1468

display matrices:

size:	14D at 16pE	16D at 18pE	18D at 20pE	22D at 24pE	28D at 30pE	36D at 36pE	48D at 60pE
line:	T.1587	T.1818	T.2048	T.2538	T.3252	T.4024	T.5420

690: Univers Medium Condensed Roman/italic

composition matrices: UA.484 = 5D-12D, extra &: S16511, S16512, superior: L251
5D was not supplied after 1969

size:	5D at 6pE	6D at 7pE	7D at 8pE	8D at 9pE	8.5D at 9pE	9D at 10pE	10D at 11pE	11D at 12pE	12D at 13pE
set:	5(?)	6	6.75	7.25	8	8.5	9.75	10.5	11.25
line:	M.1220	M.1234	M.1265	M.1290	M.1320	M.1350	M.1408	M.1436	M.1468

display matrices:

size:	14D at 16pE	16D at 18pE	18D at 20pE	22D at 24pE	28D at 30pE	36D at 36pE	48D at 60pE
line:	T.1587	T.1818	T.2048	T.2538	T.3252	T.4024	T.5420

688: Univers Medium Expanded Roman

composition matrices: UA.484 = 6D-10D, extra &: S16511, superior: L266

size:	6D at 7pE	8D at 9pE	9D at 10pE	10D at 11pE
set:	9.5	11.75	13.75	16
line:	M.1234	M.1290	M.1350	M.1408

display matrices:

size:	12D at 13pE	14D at 16pE	16D at 18pE	18D at 20pE	22D at 24pE	28D at 30pE	36D at 36pE	48D at 60pE
line:	T.1365	T.1587	T.1818	T.2048	T.2538	T.3252	T.4024	T.5420

691: Univers Medium Extra Condensed Roman

composition matrices: UA.500 = 8D-12D, extra &: S16511, superior: L263

size:	8D at 9pE	9D at 10pE	10D at 11pE	12D at 13pE
set:	5.5	6	7	8
line:	M.1290	M.1350	M.1408	M.1460

display matrices:

size:	14D at 16pE	18D at 20pE	22D at 24pE	28D at 30pE	36D at 36pE	48D at 60pE
line:	T.1587	T.2048	T.2538	T.3252	T.4024	T.5420

697: Univers Ultra Bold Expanded Roman

composition matrices: UA.490 = 6D-10D, extra &: S16511, superior: L269

size:	6D at 7pE	8D at 9pE	9D at 10pE	10D at 11pE
set:	9.5	11.75	13.75	16
line:	M.1234	M.1290	M.1350	M.1408

display matrices:

size:	12D at 13pE	14D at 16pE	16D at 18pE	18D at 20pE	22D at 24pE	28D at 30pE	36D at 36pE	48D at 60pE
line:	T.1365	T.1587	T.1818	T.2048	T.2538	T.3252	T.4024	T.5420

==== V ====
- Van Dijck

203: Van Dijck Roman.italic

composition matrices: UA.354 = 7pt-14pt

size:	7pt (6D)	7pt (7D)	8pt (7D)	8pt (8D)	10pt op 8D	10pt (10D)	11pt op 9D	11pt (11D)	12pt (12D)	13pt (12D)	14pt (14D)
special features	short desc.		short desc.		short desc.		short desc.
set:	7.5	7.5	8	8	8.75	8.75	9.75	9.75	10	11	12
line:	M.1235	M.1235	M.1255	M.1255	M.1286	M.1286	M.1310	M.1310	M.1331	M.1462	M.1457

large composition: UA.423

size:	16pt (16D)	18pt (18D)
set:	13.25	14.75
line:	T.1601	T.1797

display matrices:

size:	16pt	18pt	24pt	30pt	36pt
line:	T.1601	T.1797	T.2398	T.2944	T.3584

- Van Krimpen Bold

520: Van Krimpen Bold (see: 520 Romulus Bold)

- Veronese

_59: Veronese (cancelled in 1967)

composition matrices: UA.4 = 11pt-12pt

size:	11pt (10D)	12pt (12D)
set:	10.5	12
line:	M.1364	M.1420

large-composition matrices:

size:	14pt (14D)	18pt (18D)	24pt (24D)
UA. Roman:	106	106	107
UA. italic:	128	128	129
set:	14	18	24
line:	T.1533	T.1948	T.2640

display matrices:

size:	14pt	18pt	24pt	30pt	36pt
line:	T.1533	T.1948	T.2640	T.3194	T.3884

- Victoria

180: Victoria Bold Condensed Roman (see: 180 Victoria Bold Condensed Titling)
180: Victoria Bold Condensed Titling Roman (synonym: 180 Victoria Bold Condensed)

composition matrices: UA.49 = 10pt-12pt

size:	10pt (10D)	12pt (12D)
set:	8.75	10.75
line:	M.1420	M.1500

display matrices:

size:	14pt	18pt	24pt	30pt	36pt
line:	T.1671	T.1948	T.2640	T.3194	T.3884

181: Victoria Condensed Titling Roman

composition matrices: UA.50 = 12pt

size:	12pt (12D)
set:	12.25
line:	M.1715

display matrices:

size:	14pt	18pt	24pt	30pt	36pt
line:	T.1809	T.2224	T.2960	T.3608	T.4436

182: Victoria Titling Roman (synonym: 182 Titling)

display matrices:

size:	14pt	16pt	18pt	24pt	30pt	36pt
line:	T.1533	T.1809	T.1948	T.2640	T.3194	T.3884

==== W ====
- Walbaum

374: Walbaum Roman/italic

composition matrices: UA.349 = 6D-12D, UA.351 = 14pt, UA.352 = 14D, UA.353 = 16D

size:	6D at 7pE	8D at 9pE	9D at 10pE	10D at 11pE	11D at 12pE	12D at 13pE	14pt (14D)	14D at 16pE	16D
set:	7.75	9	9.75	10	10.75	11.75	13.75	14	15
line:	M.1227	M.1225	M.1254	M.1277	M.1285	M.1290	M.1533	M.1533	M.1810

display matrices:

size:	14pt	16D at 18pE	20D at 22pE	24D at 30pE	30D at 36pE	36D at 36pE	42D at 48pE	48D at 60pE	60D at 72pE	72pt
line:	T.1308	T.1740	T.2110	T.2546	T.3355	T.4044	T.4739	T.5450	T.6830	T.7670

674: Walbaum Roman/italic (see: 374 Walbaum)
375: Walbaum Medium Roman/italic

composition matrices: UA.349 = 6D-12D, UA.351 = 14pt, UA.352 = 14D, UA.353 = 16D

size:	6D at 7pE	8D at 9pE	9D at 10pE	10D at 11pE	11D at 12pE	12D at 13pE	14pt (14D)	14D at 16pE	16D
set:	7.75	9	9.75	10	10.75	11.75	13.75	14	15
line:	M.1227	M.1225	M.1254	M.1277	M.1285	M.1290	M.1533	M.1533	M.1810

display matrices:

size:	14pt	16D at 18pE	20D at 22pE	24D at 30pE	30D at 36pE	36D at 36pE	42D at 48pE	48D at 60pE	60D at 72pE	72pt
line:	T.1308	T.1740	T.2110	T.2546	T.3355	T.4044	T.4739	T.5450	T.6830	T.7670

- Wenceslas Script script

385: Wenceslas Script (cancelled in 1967)

display matrices:

size:	18pt
line:	T.1865

Designed by Karel Svolinsky, (11 January 1896, Heiligenberg near Olmütz, Mähren - 16 September 1986, Prague) Czech painter, graphic designer and book illustrator. He studied at the school of arts and crafts in Prague. Later, he taught as a Professor at this University. Svolinsky Antiqua (1925), Wenceslas Script(1933) Grotesk(1943)
One incomplete set survives at the BookArtMuseum, Lodz, Poland

- Wide Gothic

_97: Wide Gothic Roman (see: 97 Grotesque Bold)

- Wide Latin

164: Wide Latin Roman (see: 164 Latin Wide)

- Wigan Condensed

273: Wigan Condensed (cancelled in 1965)

display matrices:

size:	18pt
line:	T.1945

- Worcester Old Face

123: Worcester Old Face (cancelled in 1965)

== Fraktur ==
- _89: Fraktur Antiqua Roman (cancelled voor 1966) (see also Neudeutsche Fraktur)
- _98: Alte 'Monotype' Fraktur (cancelled in 1972)

composition matrices: UA. 5F

size:	6D (6.5pt E)	8D (9pt E)	9D (10pt E)	10D (11pt E)	12D (13pt E)	14
set:	6.75	8.25	9.25	10	13	13.5
line:	.1276	.1349	.1396	.1431	.1530	.1533

display matrices:

size:	18	20D	24	24D	30	36	48D	60D
line:	.2011	.2382	.2724	.2880	.3299	.4014	.5820	.7300

- 449: Alte 'Monotype' Fraktur Halbfette (see: Alte Fraktur Fette)
- 102: Alte Schwabacher (cancelled in 1972)
- _31: Armin Fraktur
- _32: Armin Fraktur Fette
- _34: Armin Fraktur Halbfette
- _37: Bamberger Fraktur (cancelled in 1967)
- _49: Bamberger Fraktur Fette (cancelled in 1967)
- _48: Bamberger Fraktur Halbfette (cancelled in 1964)
- 521: Berliner Fraktur (cancelled in 1965)
- 387: Blücher Fraktur Fette (cancelled in 1967)
- 116: Breitkopf Fraktur (cancelled in 1972)
- 367: Breitkopf Fraktur (cancelled in 1972)
- 256: Breitkopf Fraktur Fette (cancelled in 1972)
- 413: Breitkopf Fraktur Halbfette
- 256: Dürer Fraktur
- 513: Dürer Fraktur Fette (cancelled in 1965)
- 512: Dürer Fraktur Halbfette (cancelled in 1965)
- 363: Enge Fraktur Halbfette (cancelled in 1967)
- 498: Enschedé Fraktur (cancelled in 1967)
- 296: Erfurter Fraktur (cancelled in 1964)
- 379: Essener Fraktur Fette (cancelled in 1967)
- _38: Fraktur (cancelled in 1964)
- _94: Große Moderne Fraktur (cancelled in 1967)
- 308: Helen Fraktur (cancelled in 1964)
- 384: Hessen Fraktur (cancelled in 1964)
- 202: Hessen Fraktur Halbfette (cancelled in 1964)
- 417: Hessen Fraktur Halbfette (cancelled in 1964)
- 315: Hutten Fraktur (cancelled in 1964)
- 423: Jean Paul Fraktur (cancelled in 1967)
- _40: Kasseler Fraktur
- _41: Kasseler Fraktur Halbfette
- _56: Koelner Fraktur
- _58: Koelner Fraktur halbfette
- 118: Mainzer Fraktur
- 132: Mainzer Fraktur Halbfette
- _64: Moderne Fraktur
- _66: Moderne Fraktur Fette
- _86: Moderne Schwabacher
- _93: Moderne Schwabacher Halbfette
- _35: Neue Schwabacher
- _36: Neue Schwabacher
- 463: Rundgotisch
- 186: Schmale Nürnburger Gotisch (cancelled in 1965)

display matrices in 6 sizes

size:	14D	18D	20D	24D	28D	36D
line:	T.1671	T.2054	T.2560	T.3052	T.3524	T.4574

- 187: Schmalfette Frankfurter Fraktur

display matrices in 7 sizes

size:	14D	16D	20D	24D	28D	36D	48D
line:	T.1671	T.2086	T.2620	T.3102	T.3584	T.4654	T.6282

- 483: Uhlen Rundgotisch
- 205: Unger Fraktur
- 277: Unger Fraktus Halbfette
- _28: Wittenberg Fraktur
- _29: Wittenberg Fraktur
- _83: Wuerzburger Fraktur

== Non-Latin-typefaces ==
=== Amharic ===
599: Amharic

composition matrices: 9D-12D

size:	9D	12D
set:	9.5	11.75

display matrices: 14D

624: Amharic

composition matrices: 10D

size:	10D
set:	10

=== Arabic ===
409: Arabic (cancelled in 1946. replaced by series 549)
542: Arabic Bold (destroyed in a bombardement)
415: Arabic Display (cancelled in 1950)
549: Arabic Naskh

composition matrices: 8D-18D, for 8D a special mould was needed.

size:	8D	10D	12D	14D	16D	18D
set:	9.25	11.5	11.5	11.5	13.25	16.5

display matrices:

size	24D	36D	48D matrices-holder Xb6SL was needed for casting

589: Arabic Naskh Accented

large composition matrices:

size:	20D	24
set:	13.5	16.5

649: Arabic Naskh Bold

composition matrices: 8D-18D

size:	8D	10D	12D	14D	16D	18D
set:	9.25	11.5	11.5	11.5	13.25	16.5

display matrices:

size	24D	30D	36D	42D	48D	54D

559: Arabic Solloss

Display matrices:

size	54D with holder Xb7SL

507: (see: 507 Urdu)
707: (see: 707 Urdu)
721: Farsi

composition matrices: 10D-12D

size:	10D	12D
set:	10.75	13

display matrices:

size	18D	24D	36D	48D

=== Armenian ===
638: Armanian

composition matrices: 8D-12D

size:	8D	10D	12D
set:	8.5	10.25	12.5

=== Bangali ===
470: Bengali

composition matrices: 8D-12D

size:	10pt	12pt	14pt
set:	7.5	9	10.25

700: Bengali

composition matrices: 8D-12D

size:	10pt	12pt	14pt
set:	7.5	9	10.5

701: Bengali Bold

composition matrices: 8D-12D

size:	10pt	12pt	14pt
set:	7.5	9	10.5

670: Bengali Bold (cancelled in 1967)

=== Burmese ===
558: Burmese Light

composition matrices: 12pt-18pt

size:	12pt	14pt	16pt	18pt
set:	9	10.5	12	12.75

578: Burmese Bold

composition matrices: 12pt-18pt

size:	12pt	14pt	18pt
set:	9	10.5	12	12.75

=== Chinese ===
633: Chinese (cancelled in 1974)
133: Chu Yin (cancelled in 1967)

=== Coptic ===
609: Louvain Coptic

=== Cyrillic ===
(Russian, Serbian, Bulgarian and Macedonian)
_42: Albion

composition matrices: 6.5(6D)-13pt(12D)

size:	6.5pt (6D)	9pt (8D)	10pt (9D)	11pt (10D)	13pt (12D)
cast at:	7pE	9pE	10pE	11pE	13pE
set:	7.75	9	9.75	10.5	12.5
line:	M.1235	M.1270	M.1300	M.1320	M.1390

_63: Albion

composition matrices: 9(8D)-13pt(12D)

size:	9pt (8D)	11pt (10D)	13pt (12D)
set:	8.25	9.5	11.5
line:	M.1270	M.1320	M.1390

_70: Albion

composition matrices: 6.5(6D)-13pt(12D)

size:	6.5pt (6D)	9pt (8D)	11pt (10D)	13pt (12D)
cast at:	7pE	9pE	11pE	13pE
set:	7.75	9.75	11	13
line:	M.1225	M.1280	M.1327	M.1387

169: Baskerville (Russian) Roman / italic

composition matrices: 9pt-11pt

size:	9pt (8D)	11pt (10D)
line:	M.1266	M.1320

display matrices: Roman

size:	18pt	24pt	36pt
line:	T.1672	T.2226	T.3332

370: Bembo Titling

display matrices: 36pt-42pt

size:	36pt	42pt
line:	T.4436	T.5196

260: Bodoni Bold Roman / italic

display matrices: 14pt-72pt

size:	14pt	18pt	24pt	30pt	36pt	48pt	60pt	72pt
line:	T.1356	T.1741	T.2324	T.2914	T.3474	T.4716	T.5823	T.7100

529: Bodoni Bold Condensed

display matrices: 14pt-36pt

size:	14pt	18pt	24pt	30pt	36pt
line:	T.1356	T.1741	T.2324	T.2914	T.3444

120: Bodoni Ultra Bold (Cyrillic) Roman

display matrices: 14pt-42pt

size:	14pt	18pt	24pt	30pt	36pt	42pt
line:	T.1472	T.1876	T.2502	T.3094	T.3746	T.4436

_17: Cushing (cancelled in 1967)
_68: French Old Style

composition matrices: 6.5(6D)-13pt(12D)

size:	6.5pt (6D)	9pt (8D)	11pt (10D)	13pt (12D)
cast at:	7pE	9pE	11pE	13pE
set:	7.5	8.75	10.25	12.25
line:	M.1215	M.1260	M.1320	M.1388

_69: French Old Style Bold

composition matrices: 6.5(6D)-13pt(12D)

size:	6.5pt (6D)	9pt (8D)	11pt (10D)	13pt (12D)
cast at:	7pE	9pE	11pE	13pE
set:	7.5	8.75	10.25	12.25
line:	M.1215	M.1260	M.1320	M.1388

display matrices:

size:	14pt	18pt	24pt	30pt	36pt	42pt	48pt	60pt	72pt
line:	T.1533	T.1948	T.2640	T.3194	T.3884	T.4576	T.5268	T.6651	T.7930

_44: French Round Face

composition matrices: 6.5pt-13pt

size:	6.5pt (6D)	9pt (8D)	11pt (10D)	13pt (12D)
set:	7.75	9.75	11	13
line:	M.1237	M.1285	M.1332	M.1415

201: Garamond Bold (Cyrillic Roman

display matrices:

size:	18pt	24pt	30pt
line:	T.1810	T.2364	T.2918

262: Gill Sans

composition matrices: 6pt-12pt

size:	6pt (6D)	8pt (8D)	9pt (9D)	10pt (10D)	11pt (11D)	12pt (12D)
set:	6.5	8	9	9.5	10.25	11.25
line:	M.1220	M.1255	M.1285	M.1302	M.1327	M.1360

display matrices:

size:	14pt	16pt	20pt	24pt
line:	T.1395	T.1611	T.2002	T.2480

275: Gill Sans Bold

composition matrices: 6pt-12pt

size:	6pt (6D)	8pt (8D)	9pt (9D)	10pt (10D)	11pt (11D)	12pt (12D)
set:	6.5	8	9	9.5	10.25	11.25
line:	M.1220	M.1255	M.1285	M.1302	M.1327	M.1360

display matrices:

size:	14pt	16pt	20pt	24pt
line:	T.1395	T.1611	T.2002	T.2480

373: Gill Sans Bold Condensed Titling

display matrices:

size:	14pt	18pt	24pt	30pt	36pt	48pt
line:	T.1811	T.2363	T.3193	T.3886	T.4714	T.6418

233: Gill Sans Cameo Roman

display matrices:

size:	24pt
line:	T.2890

485: Gill Sans Condensed

display matrices: 14pt-36pt

size:	14pt	18pt	24pt	30pt	36pt
line:	T.1395	T.1841	T.2480	T.2918	T.3606

362: Gill Sans Light

composition matrices: 6pt-12pt

size:	6pt (6D)	8pt (8D)	10pt (9D)	12pt (12D)
set:	6.5	8	9.5	11.25
line:	M.1220	M.1255	M.1302	M.1360

display matrices:

size:	14pt	16pt	20pt	24pt	30pt	36pt
line:	T.1395	T.1611	T.2002	T.2480	T.2918	T.3606

_96: Gothic (cancelled in 1965)
_51: Grotesque

composition matrices: 6pt-12pt

size:	6pt (6D)	8pt (8D)	10pt (9D)	12pt (12D)
set:	7.75	9.5	11.5	15.5
line:	M.1220	M.1235	M.1291	M.1444

display matrices:

size:	14pt	18pt	24pt	30pt	36pt	42pt	48pt
line:	T.1533	T.1948	T.2640	T.3194	T.3884	T.4576	T.5268

_97: Grotesque Bold (cancelled in 1967)
_11: Grotesque Bold Condensed (cancelled in 1967)
166: Grotesque Bold Condensed (Cyrillic) Roman (synonym: 166 Grotesque Bold Condensed Titling)

display matrices:

size:	14pt	18pt	24pt	30pt	36pt	42pt	48pt	60pt	72pt
line:	T.1671	T.2085	T.2778	T.3470	T.4299	T.4991	T.5821	T.7204	T.8623

166: Grotesque Bold Condensed Titling Roman (see: 166 Grotesque Bold Condensed (Cyrillic))
_33: Grotesque Condensed Roman

composition matrices: 6pt-13pt

size:	6pt (6D)	9pt (8D)	11pt (10D)	13pt (12D)
set:	6.75	8.5	9.75	11.5
line:	M.1255	M.1315	M.1395	M.1440

display matrices:

size:	14pt	18pt	24pt	30pt	36pt	42pt	48pt
line:	T.1533	T.1948	T.2640	T.3194	T.3884	T.4576	T.5268

383: Grotesque Condensed Roman

composition matrices: 6pt-13pt

size:	6D op 7pE	8D op 9pE	10D op 11pE	12D op 13pE
set:	5	6	7	8
line:	M.1280	M.1358	M.1410	M.1500

display matrices:

size:	14D at 16pE	18D at 20pE	24D at 30pE	30D at 36pE	36D at 36pE	48D at 60pE	60 at 72pE	72pt
line:	T.1626	T.2074	T.2776	T.3565	T.4164	T.5620	T.7030	T.7890

383: Grotesque Condensed

composition matrices: 6D-12D

size:	6D at 7pE	8D at 9pE	10D at 11pE	12D at 13pE
set:	5	6	7	8
line:	M.1280	M.1358	M.1410	M.1500

display matrices:

size:	14D	18D	24D	30D	36D	48D	60D op 72pE	72pt
line:	T.1626	T.2074	T.2776	T.3565	T.4164	T.5620	T.7030	T.7890

_39: Modern Condensed

composition matrices: 6.5pt-13pt

size:	6.5pt (6D)	9pt (8D)	11pt (10D)	13pt (12D)
set:	6.5	8	9.5	11.5
line:	M.1225	M.1260	M.1320	M.1390

_77: Modern Extended (cancelled in 1967)
_75: Modern Wide (cancelled in 1967)
_27: Neo Didot

composition matrices: 6.5pt-13pt

size:	6.5pt (6D)	9pt (8D)	10pt (9D)	11pt (10D)	13pt (12D)
set:	7.75	9	9.75	10.5	12.5
line:	M.1235	M.1270	M.1300	M.1320	T.1390

506: Placard Bold Condensed

display matrices:

size:	14D at 16pE	16D at 18pE	20D at 22pE	24D at 30pE	28D at 30pE	36D at 36pE	42D at 48pE	48pt at 60pE
line:	T.1728	T.1964	T.2478	T.2996	T.3442	T.4414	T.5179	T.5960

515: Placard Bold Condensed

display matrices:

size:	36pt	48pt	60pt	72pt
line:	T.4299	T.5808	T.7300	T.8760

568: Placard Condensed

display matrices:

size:	14D op 16pE	16D op 18pE	20D op 22pE	22D op 30pE	28D op 30pE	36D op 36pE	48D op 60pE	60D op 72pE
line:	T.1806	T.2052	T.2544	T.3076	T.3592	T.4614	T.6230	T.7800

522: Placard Condensed Titling

display matrices:

size:	72pt
line:	T.9700

194: Plantin Bold (Russian) Roman

composition matrices: 6pt-12pt

size:	6pt (6D)	8pt (8D)	10pt (9D)	12pt (12D)
set:	7	8.5	9.5	11.75
line:	M.1237	M.1285	M.1332	M.1415

display matrices:

size:	14pt	18pt	24pt	30pt	36pt	42pt	48pt	60pt
line:	T.1533	T.1948	T.2640	T.3194	T.3884	T.4576	T.5268	T.6651

113: Plantin Light (Russian) Roman / italic

composition matrices: 6pt-12pt

size:	6pt (6D)	8pt (8D)	10pt (9D)	12pt (12D)
set:	7	8.5	10	11.75
line:	M.1237	M.1285	M.1342	M.1426

display matrices:

size:	14pt	16pt	24pt	30pt	36pt	42pt	48pt	60pt
line:	T.1533	T.1948	T.2640	T.3194	T.3884	T.4576	T.5268	T.6651

327: Times New Roman

composition matrices: 6pt-12pt

size:	6pt (6D)	7pt (7D)	8pt (8D)	9pt (9D)	10pt (9D)	12pt (12D)
set:	6.75	7.75	8.25	9	9.76	12
line:	M.1230	M.1268	M.1298	M.1325	M.1338	M.1420

display matrices:

size:	14pt	18pt	24pt	30pt	36pt	42pt	48pt	60pt	72pt
line:	T.1438	T.1948	T.2640	T.3194	T.3884	T.4576	T.5268	T.6651	T.7930

334: Times Bold

composition matrices: 6pt-12pt

size:	6pt (6D)	7pt (7D)	8pt (8D)	9pt (9D)	10pt (9D)	12pt (12D)
set:	6.75	7.75	8.25	9	9.76	12
line:	M.1230	M.1268	M.1298	M.1325	M.1338	M.1420

display matrices:

size:	14pt	18pt	24pt	30pt	36pt	42pt	48pt	60pt	72pt
line:	T.1438	T.1948	T.2640	T.3194	T.3884	T.4576	T.5268	T.6651	T.7930

=== Devenagari ===
155: Devenagari

composition matrices: 12pt-16pt

size:	12pt	14pt	16pt
set:	9	10.5	12

display matrices:

size:	20pt	24pt	36pt	48pt

346: Devenagari Bold

composition matrices: 10pt-16pt, voor 10pt is een speciale gietvorm nodig

size:	10pt	12pt	14pt	16pt
set:	7.5	9	10.5	12

755: Devenagari Italic

composition matrices: 10pt-16pt

size:	10pt	12pt	14pt	16pt
set:	7.5	9	10.5	12

Display matrices 18pt, 24pt, 30pt, 36pt

=== Gaelic ===
_24: Gaelic

composition matrices: UA.23: 8pt, 10pt, 12 pt, UA.108: 14 pt, 18pt, UA.109: 24 pt

size:	6pt (6D)	8pt (8D)	10pt (10D)	12pt (12D)
set:	6.25	8.25	9.25	11.25
line:	.1200	.1248	.1330	.1387

large composition matrices: UA.108 = 14 pt, 18pt, UA.109 = 24 pt

size:	14pt	18pt	24pt
set:	14	18	24
line:	.1533	.1948	2640

display matrices: 14pt - 72pt

size:	14pt	18pt	24pt	30pt	36pt	42pt	48pt	60pt	72pt
line:	.1533	.1948	.2640	.3194	.3884	.4576	.5268	.6651	.7930

117: Gaelic (see: 117 Gaelic Sans-Serif)
121: Colum Cille (see: 121 Gaelic Colm Cille)
121: Gaelic Colm Cille
_85: Gaelic Display
117: Gaelic Display (see: 117 Gaelic Sans-Serif)
117: Gaelic Sans Serif

=== Georgian ===
539: Georgian Light (cancelled in 1972)

display matrices: 16D

540: Georgian Bold (cancelled in 1972)

display matrices: 24D

587: Georgian

composition matrices: 8D-10D

size:	8D	10D
set:	8.75	10.75

=== Glagolitic ===
598: Glagolitic (see also: 597 Old Bulgarian)

composition matrices: 12pt:

size:	12pt
set:	11.75
line:	M.1415

=== Greek ===
259: Antigone

composition matrices: UA.432 = 13pt:

size:	13pt (12D)
set:	9.25
line:	M.1330

672: Gill Sans Bold Upright

is used as "bold" in combination with series 571 & 572

585: Gill Sans Condensed

display matrices:

size:	14pt	18pt	24pt	30pt	36pt
line:	T.1395	T.1841	T.2480	T.2918	T.3606

625: Gill Sans Bold Upright

composition matrices: UA.452 = 8-12pt:

size:	8pt (8D)	10pt (10D)	11pt (11D)	12pt (11D)
set:	8	9.5	10.25	11.25
line:	M.1255	M.1302	M.1327	M.1360

display matrices:

size:	14pt	18pt	24pt	30pt	36pt
line:	T.1395	T.1841	T.2480	T.2918	T.3606

571: Gill Sans Inclined italic

Is used as italic in combination with series 572 and 672, data similar with Series 572:

572: Gill Sans Upright Roman

composition matrices: UA.451 = 8-12pt:

size:	8pt (8D)	10pt (10D)	11pt (11D)	12pt (11D)
set:	8	9.5	10.25	11.25
line:	M.1255	M.1302	M.1327	M.1360

display matrices:

size:	14pt	18pt	24pt	30pt	36pt
line:	T.1395	T.1841	T.2480	T.2918	T.3606

473: Greek (cancelled in 1967)
_91: Greek: Inclined

composition matrices: UA.26 = 6-13pt:

size:	6pt (6D)	8pt (8D)	9pt (8D)	10pt (9D)	11pt (10D)	13pt (12D)
set:	6.75	8.25	9	9.75	10.5	12.5
line:	M.1198	M.1245	M.1270	M.1300	M.1320	M.1390

_92: Greek: Bold Upright (see also: 92 Greek Upright Display)

composition matrices: UA.26 = 6-13pt:

size:	6pt (6D)	9pt (8D)	10pt (9D)	11pt (10D)	13pt (12D)
set:	6.75	9	9.75	10.5	12.5
line:	M.1198	M.1270	M.1300	M.1320	M.1390

472: Greek: Inclined

composition matrices: UA.434 = 8-11pt:

size:	8pt (8D)	9pt (9D)	10pt (9D)	11pt (10D)
set:	8.5	9.25	9.75	10.5
line:	M.1235	M.1260	M.1290	M.1310

_90: Greek: Upright

composition matrices: UA.26 = 6-13pt:

size:	6pt (6D)	8pt (8D)	9pt (8D)	10pt (9D)	11pt (10D)	13pt (12D)
set:	7.5	8	9	9.75	10.5	12.5
line:	M.1235	M.1250	M.1270	M.1300	M.1320	M.1390

_92: Greek Upright Display (Synoniem: 92 Greek Bold Upright)

composition matrices: UA.27 = 9-13pt:

size:	9pt (8D)	11pt (10D)	13pt (12D)
set:	9	10.5	12.5
line:	M.1270	M.1320	M.1390

683: Grotesque Condensed Upright

display matrices: 14D-36D

size:	14D at 16pE	18D at 20pE	24D at 30pE	30D at 36pE	36D at 26pE
line:	T.1616	T.2074	T.2776	T.3565	T.4164

718: Grotesque Condensed Upright

display matrices: 14pt-36pt

size:	14pt	18pt	24pt	30pt	36pt
line:	T.1544	T.1948	T.2640	T.3332	T.4022

486: Heavy Greek (see: 486 Sans-Serif)
192: New Hellenic Greek

composition matrices: UA.73 = 7-12pt:

size:	7pt (7D)	9pt (8D)	10pt (9D)	11pt (10D)	12pt (11 of 12D)
set:	7.25	8.75	9.75	10.5	12
line:	M.1225	M.1273	M.1307	M.1332	M.1380

display matrices:

size:	18pt
line:	T.1807

553: Old Style Bold Inclined

composition matrices: UA.436 = 9-11pt:

size:	9pt (9D)	11pt (10D)
set:	9.25	10.5
line:	M.1257	M.1315

283: Perpetua (cancelled in 1967)
605: Placard Extra Light Condensed

display matrices: 14D-36D

size:	14D at 16pE	16D at 18pE	24D at 30pE	28D at 30pE	36D at 16pE
line:	T.1860	T.2114	T.3236	T.3722	T.4774

668: Placard Condensed Upright

display matrices: 14D-36D

size:	14D at 16pE	16D at 18pE	20D at 22pE	24D at 30pE	28D at 30pE	36D at 16pE
line:	T.1806	T.2052	T.2544	T.3076	T.3592	T.4614

106: Porson

composition matrices: UA.26 = 5.5-12pt:

size:	5.5pt (5.5D)	8pt (8D)	10pt (9D)	11pt (10D)	12pt (12D)
set:	6.5	8	9.75	10.5	12
line:	M.1195	M.1250	M.1294	M.1315	M.1356

404: Porson Condensed (cancelled in 1967)
486: Greek: Sans Serif

composition matrices: UA.415 = 8-10pt:

size:	8pt (8D)	10pt (10D)
set:	8	9.75
line:	M.1250	M.1294

739: Spartan Light Upright

Only capitals in 4 sizes, the small sizes are used as lower case with the larger sizes
composition matrices: UA.454 = 6-12pt:

size:	6pt (6D)	12pt (11D)
set:	7	11
line:	M.1282	M.1420

740: Spartan Upright

Only capitals in 4 sizes, the small sizes are used as lower case with the larger sizes
composition matrices: UA.454 = 6-12pt:

size:	6pt (6D)	12pt (11D)
set:	7	11
line:	M.1282	M.1420

741: Spartan Bold Upright

Only capitals in 4 sizes, the small sizes are used as lower case with the larger sizes
composition matrices: UA.454 = 6-12pt:

size:	6pt (6D)	12pt (11D)
set:	7	12
line:	M.1282	M.1420

565: Times Upright

composition matrices: UA.437 = 6-12pt:

size:	6pt (6D)	7pt (7D)	8pt (8D)	9pt (8D)	10pt (10D)	11pt (10D)	12pt (12D)
set:	6.75	7.75	8.25	9	9.75	10.5	12
line:	M.1230	M.1268	M.1298	M.1325	M.1338	M.1368	M.1420

display matrices:

size:	14pt	18pt
line:	T.1438	T.1948

566: Times Inclined was used as italic with Series 565 Times Upright

composition matrices: UA. 438 = 6pt-12pt, large composition matrices 14pt-18pt, (lining-data more equal)

567: Times Bold Upright

composition matrices: UA.439 = 6-12pt:

size:	6pt (6D)	8pt (8D)	10pt (10D)	12pt (12D)
set:	6.75	8.25	9.75	12
line:	M.1239	M.1298	M.1338	M.1420

display matrices:

size:	14pt	18pt	24pt	30pt	36pt
line:	T.1458	T.1873	T.2640	T.3194	T.3884

667: Times Bold Inclined

composition matrices: UA.439 = 6-12pt:

size:	6pt (6D)	8pt (8D)	10pt (10D)	12pt (12D)
set:	6.75	8.25	9.75	12
line:	M.1239	M.1298	M.1338	M.1420

display matrices:

size:	14pt	18pt	24pt	30pt	36pt
line:	T.1458	T.1873	T.2640	T.3194	T.3884

893: Univers Bold Upright

composition matrices: UA.439 = 6-12pt:

size:	8D at 9pE	9D at 10pE	10D at 11pE
set:	9.5	11.25	13
line:	M.1290	M.1350	M.1408

989: Univers Medium Inclined

composition matrices: UA.439 = 6-12pt:

size:	8D at 9pE	9D at 10pE	10D at 11pE
set:	9.5	11.25	13
line:	M.1290	M.1350	M.1408

889: Univers Medium Upright

composition matrices: UA.439 = 6-12pt:

size:	8D at 9pE	9D at 10pE	10D at 11pE
set:	9.5	11.25	13
line:	M.1290	M.1350	M.1408

=== Gujerathi ===
460: Gujerathi

composition matrices:

size:	10pt	12pt	14pt
set:	7.5	9	10.5

518: Gujerathi Bold

composition matrices:

size:	10pt	12pt	14pt
set:	7.5	9	10.5

display matrices:

size:	18pt	24pt	30pt	36pt

704: Gujerathi

composition matrices:

size:	10pt	12pt	14pt
set:	7.5	9	10.5

=== Gurmukhi ===
601: Gurmukhi Bold

composition matrices: 12-16pt:

size:	12pt	14pt	16pt
set:	9	10.5	12

604: Gurmukhi

composition matrices: 12-16pt:

size:	12pt	14pt	16pt
set:	9	10.5	12

604: Gurmukhi Light (see: 604 Gurmukhi)

=== Hebrew ===
219: Ashurith (unpointed)

composition matrices: 7-8pt:

size:	7pt at 12pE (7D)	8pt at 13pE (8D)
set:	6.5	7

487: Gill (cancelled in 1967)
222: Hebrew

composition matrices: 6-8pt:

size:	6pt at 9pE (6D)	7pt at 10pE (7D)	8pt at 13pE (8D)
set:	7	7	7

219: Hebrew Ashurith (see: 219 Ashurith)
221: Hebrew Levenim (see: 221 Levenim)
220: Hebrew Peninim (see: 220 Peninim)
228: Hebrew Rabbinic (see: 228 Rabinnic)
547: Hebrew Schocken No. 1 (cancelled in 1974)
550: Hebrew Schocken No. 2 (cancelled in 1967)
551: Hebrew Schocken No. 3 (cancelled in 1967)
218: Hebrew Sonzino (pointed) (see: 218 Sonzino)
221: Levênim (unpointed)

composition matrices: 7pt:

size:	7pt op 9pE (7D)
set:	7.25

492: Mayer
488: Mayer Pointed
220: Peninim (unpointed)

composition matrices: 5-7pt:

size:	5pt at 8pE	6pt at 9pE	7pt at 11pE
set:	5	5.5	7.25

display matrices: size: 14pt, 18pt, 24pt

489: Peninim
217: Peninim Pointed

composition matrices: 6-8pt:

size:	6pt (6D)	7pt	8pt
set:	5	5.5	7

228: Rabbinic

composition matrices: 11-12pt:

size:	11pt (10D)	12pt (12D)
set:	6.5	7

218: Sonzino

composition matrices: 9-12pt: extra point-matrices available for 9pt, when cast at 9pt Didot

size:	9pt	12pt
set:	7.5	10

display matrices: 18pt point S5469 to S5476 cast at 6 point

=== Kannada ===
588: Kannada

composition matrices: 10-16pt:

size:	10pt	12pt	14pt	16pt
set:	9.75	11.5	13.75	15.75

590: Kannada (see: 590 Malayalam)
788: Kannada
787: Kannada Semi-Bold

=== Malayalam ===
590: Malayalam (synonym: 590 Kannada)

composition matrices: 10-12pt:

size:	8pt	10pt	12pt
set:	9.75	12.5	14.75

660: Malayalam

composition matrices: 8pt:

size:	8pt
set:	11

=== Old Bulgarian ===
597: Old Bulgarian (see also: 598 Glagolitic)

composition matrices: 10-12pt:

size:	10pt (9D)	12pt (11D)
set:	9.5	11.75
line:	M.1332	M.1415

=== Oriya ===
706: Oriya

=== Sangalese ===
557: Sangalese

composition matrices: 8-14pt:

size:	8pt	10pt	12pt	14pt
set:	7.75	9.25	11	13

657: Sangalese Bold

composition matrices: 8-14pt:

size:	8pt	10pt	12pt	14pt
set:	7.75	9.25	11	13

698: Sangalese Italic

composition matrices: 8-14pt:

size:	8pt	10pt	12pt
set:	7.75	9.25	11

699: Sangalese Bold Italic

composition matrices: 8-14pt:

size:	8pt	10pt	12pt
set:	7.75	9.25	11

=== Syriac ===
564: Syriac "Estrangelo"

composition matrices: 8-10pt:

size:	8D	10D
set:	8.75	10.75

=== Tamil ===
280: Tamil

composition matrices:

size:	8pt	10pt
set:	912	15

340: Tamil Bold

composition matrices: 8pt-10pt

size:	8pt	10pt
set:	12	15

display matrices:

12pt	14pt	18pt	24pt

581: Tamil Bold (cancelled)
340: Tamil Heavy (see: 340 Tamil Bold)
580: Tamil Medium\

composition matrices:

size:	8pt	9pt	10pt	11pt	12pt
set:	9.75	11	12.5	13.5	14.75

708: Tamil Medium

composition matrices:

size:	8pt	9pt	10pt	11pt	12pt	14pt
set:	9.75	11	12.5	13.5	14.75	17

=== Telugu ===
426: Telugu (cancelled in 1969)
626: Telugu Medium

composition matrices:

size:	12pt
set:	12

726: Telugu Bold

=== Thai ===
577: Thai

composition matrices:

size:	12pt	16pt	18pt
set:	9	12	13.5

608: Thai Light

composition matrices:

size:	12pt	16pt	18pt
set:	8.5	11.5	12.75

611: Thai Bold

composition matrices:

size:	12pt	16pt	18pt
set:	9	12	13.5

621: Thai Medium

display matrices:

size:	24pt	30pt	36pt	48pt

628: Thai Light Italic

composition matrices:

size:	16pt	18pt
set:	11.5	12.75

=== Urdu ===
507: Urdu

composition matrices: 9D-16D

size:	9D	12D	14D	16D
cast at:	12pE at 12D	16pE at 16D duplex	18pE at 18D duplex	20pE at 20D duplex
set:	10.5	13	14.75	17

707: Urdu Bold

composition matrices: 9D-16D

size:	9D	12D	14D	16D
cast at:	12pE at 12D	16pE at 16D duplex	18pE at 18D duplex	20pE at 20D duplex
set:	10.5	13	14.75	17

display matrices:

size:	18D	24D	30D	42D	54D
cast at:	24pE at 24D	30pE at 30D	36pE at 36D	48pE at 48D	60pE at 60D
holder:				Xb7SL	Xb7SL
