= Bembo =

Old-style serif typeface

- Category: Serif
- Classification: Garalde; Old-style
- Designers: Francesco Griffo; Giovanni Antonio Tagliente; Monotype drawing office; Alfred Fairbank
- Foundry: Monotype
- Date created: 1495–96, 1928–29
- Variations: Bembo Titling; Bembo Condensed Italic (Fairbank)
- Shown here: ET Bembo

Bembo is a serif typeface created by the British branch of the Monotype Corporation in 1928–1929 and most commonly used for body text. It is a member of the "old-style" of serif fonts, with its regular or roman style based on a design cut around 1495 by Francesco Griffo for Venetian printer Aldus Manutius, sometimes generically called the "Aldine roman". Bembo is named after Manutius's first publication with it, a small 1496 book by the poet and cleric Pietro Bembo. The italic is based on work by Giovanni Antonio Tagliente, a calligrapher who worked as a printer in the 1520s, after the time of Manutius and Griffo.

Monotype created Bembo during a period of renewed interest in the printing of the Italian Renaissance, under the influence of Monotype executive and printing historian Stanley Morison. It followed a previous more faithful revival of Manutius's work, Poliphilus, whose reputation it largely eclipsed. Monotype also created a second, much more eccentric italic for it to the design of calligrapher Alfred Fairbank, which also did not receive the same attention as the normal version of Bembo.

Since its creation, Bembo has enjoyed continuing popularity as an attractive, legible book typeface. Prominent users of Bembo have included Penguin Books, the Everyman's Library series, Oxford University Press, Cambridge University Press, the National Gallery, Yale University Press and Edward Tufte. Bembo has been released in versions for phototypesetting and in several revivals as digital fonts by Monotype and other companies.

== History ==
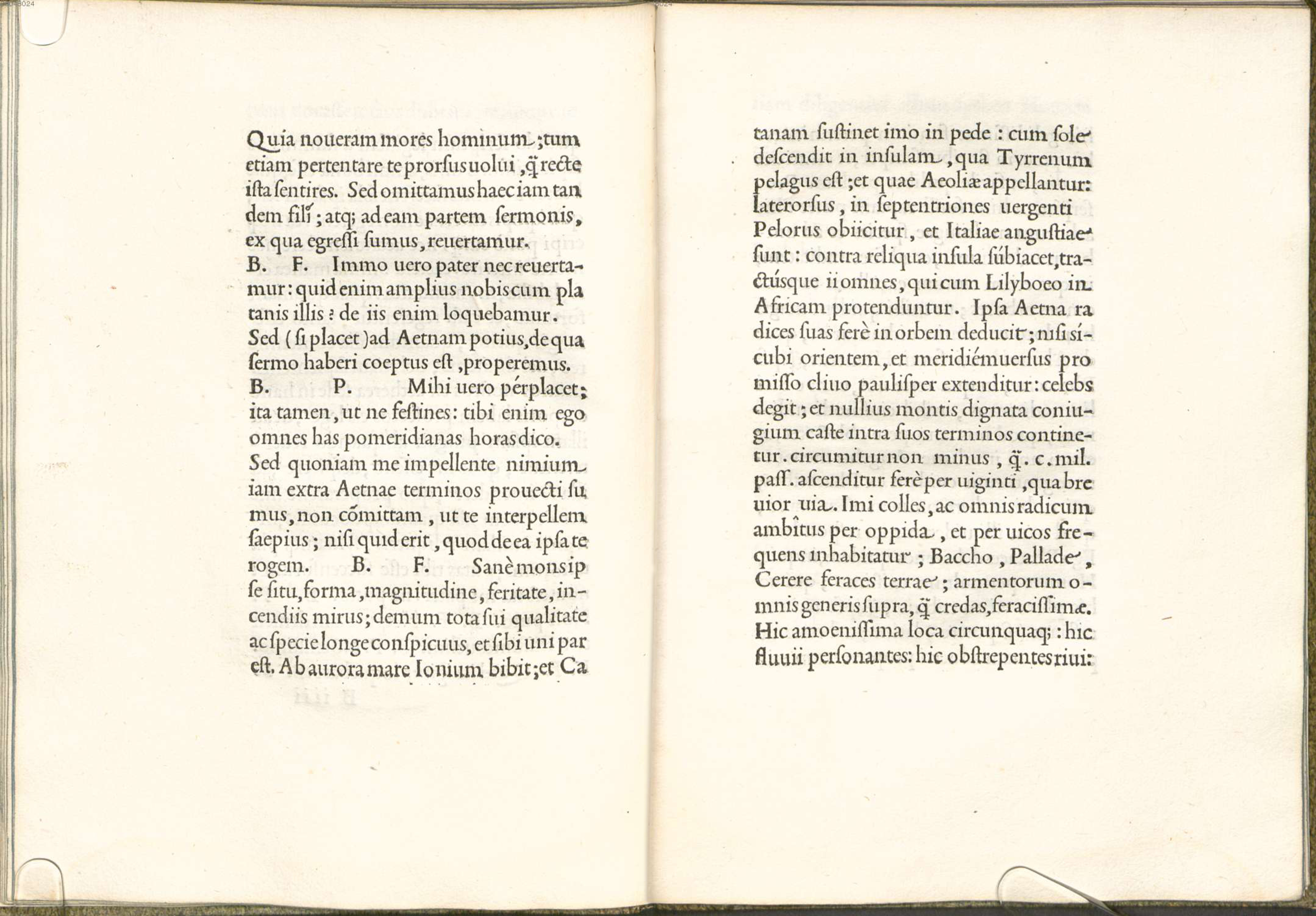
A page spread from De Aetna, the model for Bembo

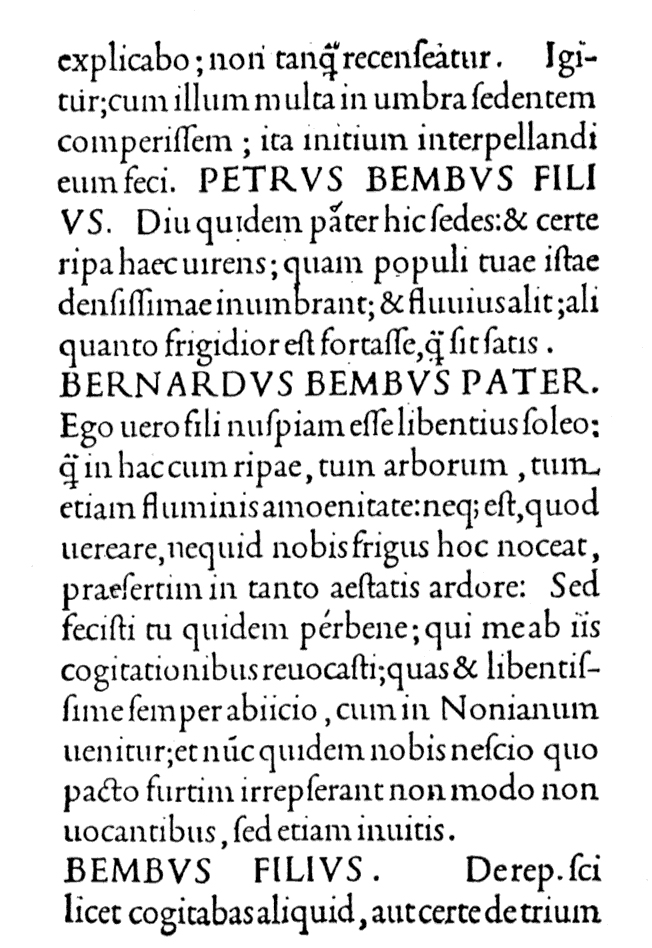
Text sample from De Aetna

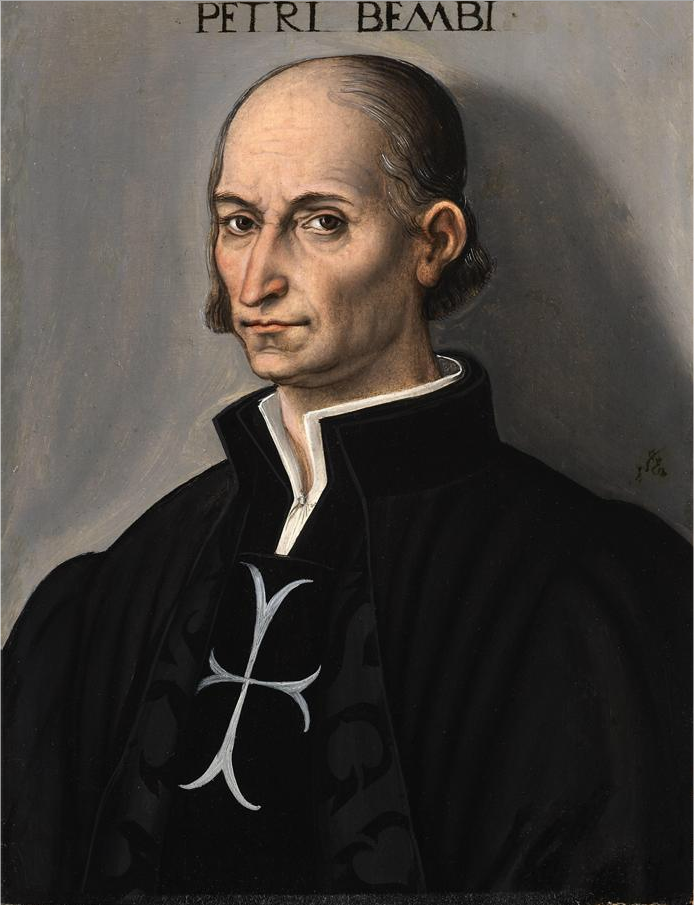
Pietro Bembo in the mid-1530s, painted by Lucas Cranach the Younger

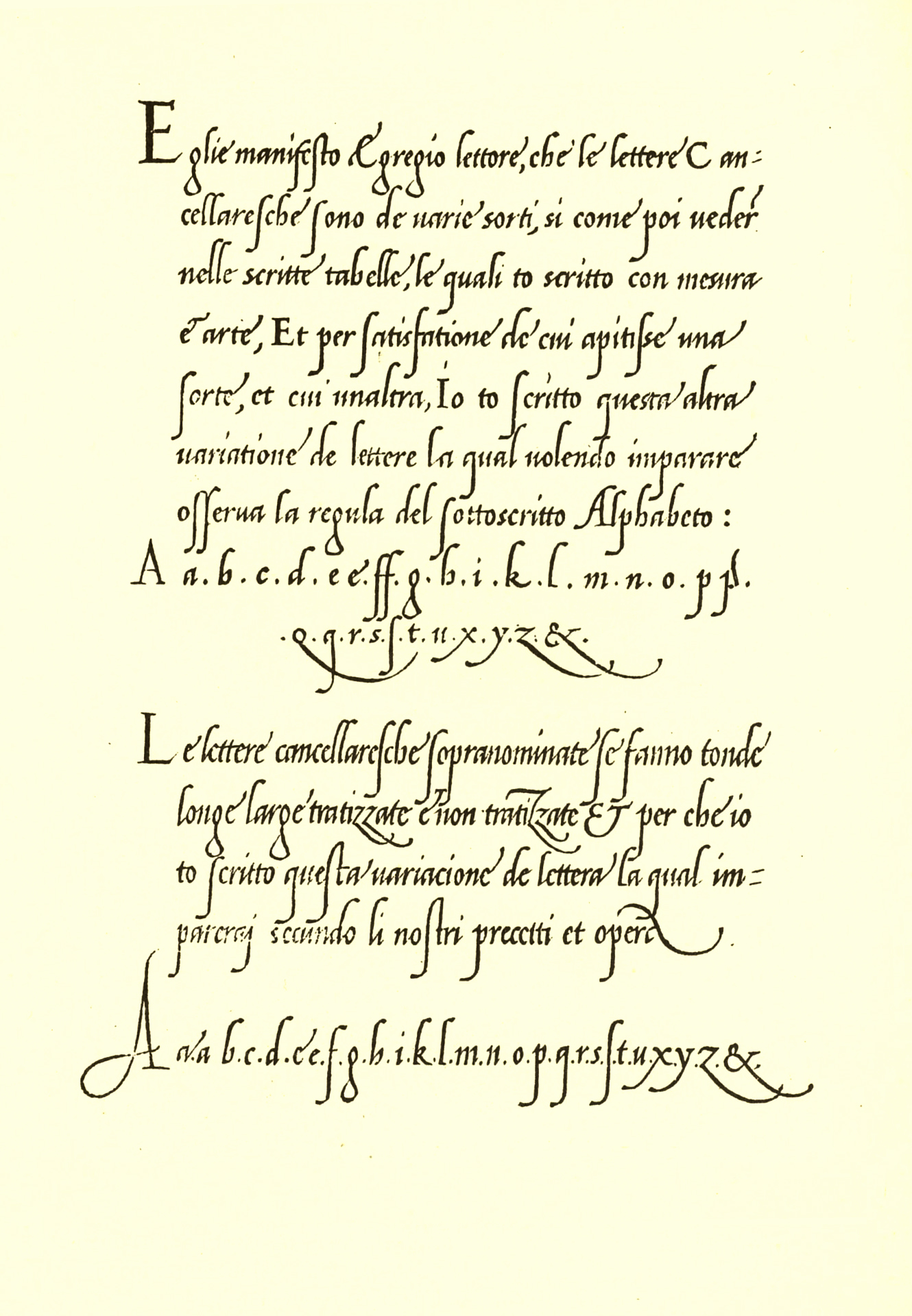
Giovanni Antonio Tagliente's 1524 writing manual, which inspired Bembo's italic. This section is engraved as a simulation of Tagliente's handwriting; other parts were set in a typeface of similar design.

The regular (roman) style of Bembo is based on Griffo's typeface for Manutius. Griffo, sometimes called Francesco da Bologna (of Bologna), was an engraver who created designs by cutting punches in steel. These were used as a master to stamp matrices, the moulds used to cast metal type.

Manutius at first printed works only in Greek. His first printing in the Latin alphabet, in February 1496 (1495 by the Venetian calendar), was a book entitled Petri Bembi de Aetna Angelum Chabrielem liber. This book, usually now called De Aetna, was a short 60-page text about a journey to Mount Etna, written by the young Italian humanist poet Pietro Bembo, who would later become a Cardinal, secretary to Pope Leo X and lover of Lucrezia Borgia.

Griffo was one of the first punchcutters to fully express the character of the humanist hand that contemporaries preferred for manuscripts of classics and literary texts, in distinction to the book hand humanists dismissed as a gothic hand or the everyday chancery hand. One of the main characteristics that distinguished Griffo's work from most of the earlier "Venetian" tradition of roman type by Nicolas Jenson and others is the now-normal horizontal cross-stroke of the "e", a letterform which Manutius popularised. Modern font designer Robert Slimbach has described Griffo's work as a breakthrough leading to an "ideal balance of beauty and functionality", as earlier has Harry Carter. The type is sometimes known as the "Aldine roman" in reference to Aldus Manutius's given name.

In France, his work inspired many French printers and punchcutters such as Robert Estienne and Claude Garamond from 1530 onwards, even though the typeface of De Aetna with its original capitals was apparently used in only about twelve books between 1496 and 1499. Historian Beatrice Warde suggested in the 1920s that its influence may have been due to the high quality of printing shown in the original De Aetna volume, perhaps created as a small pilot project. De Aetna was printed using a mixture of alternate characters, perhaps as an experiment, which included a lower-case p in the same style as the capital letter with a flat top. (Note: An alternative suggestion has been made by printer and type designer Giovanni Mardersteig, who suggested that the use of a limited number of alternative forms was intended to suggest the writing of a scribe.) In 1499, Griffo recut the capitals, changing the appearance of the typeface slightly. This version was used to print Manutius' famous illustrated volume Hypnerotomachia Poliphili.

Griffo's roman typeface, with several replacements of the capitals, continued to be used by Manutius's company until the 1550s, when a refresh of its equipment brought in French typefaces which had been created by Garamond, Pierre Haultin and Robert Granjon under its influence. UCLA curators, who maintain a large collection of Manutius's printing, have described this as a "wholesale change ... the press followed precedent; popular in France, [these] types rapidly spread over western Europe". Ultimately, old-style fonts like all of these fell out of use with the arrival of the much more geometric Didone types of the eighteenth and nineteenth centuries. They returned to popularity later in the century, with the arrival of the Arts and Crafts movement.

In 1500, Manutius released the first books printed using italic type, again designed by Griffo. This was originally not intended as a complementary design, as is used today, but rather as an alternative, more informal typeface suitable for small volumes.

=== Italic ===
Bembo's italic is not based directly on the work of Griffo, but on the work of calligrapher and handwriting teacher Giovanni Antonio Tagliente (sometimes written Giovannantonio). He published a writing manual, The True Art of Excellent Writing, in Venice in 1524, after the time of Manutius and Griffo, with engravings and some text set in an italic typeface presumably based on his calligraphy. (Note: This is a shortened form of the full title.) (Tagliente did not only publish on handwriting, but also self-help guides on learning to read, arithmetic, embroidery and a book of model love letters.) It too was imitated in France, with imitations appearing from 1528 onwards. Another influential italic type created around this time was that of Ludovico Vicentino degli Arrighi, also a calligrapher who became involved in printing. His almost upright italic design was also imitated in France and would also become influential to twentieth-century font designs. Morison continued to be interested in Tagliente's work and late in life curated a book, Splendour of Ornament, on Tagliente's decorative pattern designs. (Note: Published posthumously, it featured restorations of Tagliente's artwork by Victor Lardent, the designer who had thirty years before drawn the designs of Times New Roman, art directed by Morison.)

== Monotype history ==
Bembo showing its diagonal axis (strokes are thinnest to the left of top centre, simulating handwriting done by the right hand) and e with a level stroke. Below is Monotype's contemporary design Centaur, based on a slightly earlier style of printing from the 1470s, with a tilted e. Both designs show classic old-style features, including top serifs with a moderate downward slope.

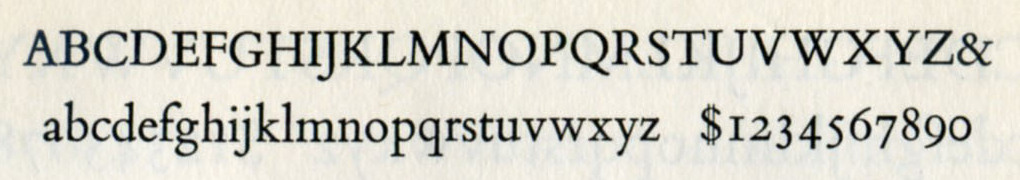

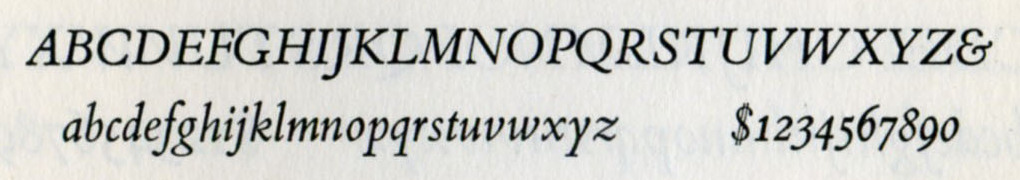
Bembo in metal type.

Monotype Bembo is one of the most famous revivals of the Aldine typeface of 1495. It was created under the influence of Monotype executive and printing historian Stanley Morison by the design team at the Monotype factory in Salfords, Surrey, south of London. While most printers of the Arts and Crafts movement of the previous sixty years had been more interested in the slightly earlier typefaces of Nicolas Jenson, Morison greatly admired Aldus Manutius' typeface above others of the period. The main reasons for his admiration were the balance of the letter construction, such as the evenness of the 'e' with a level cross-stroke and the way the capitals were made slightly lower than the ascenders of the tallest lower-case letters. (Note: As noted above, it is now accepted that the "Aldine roman was the key influence on new French renaissance typefaces of the 1530s cut by artisans including Claude Garamond and therefore on almost all typefaces created since. Morison and his collaborator at Monotype Beatrice Warde were crucial promoters of this conclusion.) He described the Aldine roman as "inspired not by writing, but by engraving; not script but sculpture." His friend printer Giovanni Mardersteig similarly suggested the appeal of the Aldine face in his commentary that "Griffo...rid himself of the influence of the characteristic round forms of letters written with a pen; he developed instead a more narrow and it might be said a more modern form, which was better suited to [engraving]...whereas Jenson's style made a strong appeal to the sense of beauty prevalent in the period of Art Nouveau, today our taste in architecture and typography inclines towards simpler and more disciplined forms."

Bembo's development took place following a series of breakthroughs in printing technology which had occurred over the last fifty years without breaking from the use of metal type. Pantograph engraving had allowed punches to be precisely machined from large plan drawings. This gave a cleaner result than historic typefaces whose master punches had been hand-carved out of steel at the exact size of the desired letter. It also allowed rapid development of a large range of sizes. In addition, hand printing had been superseded by the hot metal typesetting systems of the period, of which Monotype's was one of the most popular (in competition with Linotype's). Both allowed metal type to be quickly cast under the control of a keyboard, eliminating the need to manually cast metal type and slot it into place into a printing press. With no need to keep type in stock, just the matrices used to cast the type, printers could use a wider range of fonts and there was increasing demand for varied typefaces. Artistically, meanwhile, the preference for using mechanical, geometric Didone and “modernised old style” fonts introduced in the nineteenth century was being displaced by a revival of interest in "true old style" serif fonts developed before this, a change that has proved to be lasting. At the same time, hot metal typesetting had imposed new restrictions: in Monotype's system (while less restrictive than Linotype's), in order to mechanically count the number of characters that could be fitted on a line, letters could only be certain widths, and care was needed to produce letters that looked harmonious in spite of this.

Morison was interested in the history of the 15th century Italian printing, and had discussed the topic with his correspondent, the printer Giovanni Mardersteig, in correspondence with whom he wrote a series of letters discussing Bembo's development. He also discussed the project in his letters with the Poet Laureate Robert Bridges, who had some interest in printing. (Note: Two late publications of Bridges would be set in Monotype typefaces reviving Italian renaissance printing as a result of this interest. Bridges' poem The Tapestry had been printed in Arrighi and The Testament of Beauty was printed to a design by Morison in Bembo italic.) For the project Morison bought a copy of De Aetna which he then sold to Monotype as a model.

Bembo's technical production followed Monotype's standard method of the period. The characters were drawn on paper in large plan diagrams by the highly experienced drawing office team, led and trained by American engineer Frank Hinman Pierpont and Fritz Stelzer, both of whom Monotype had recruited from the German printing industry. The drawing staff who executed the design was disproportionately female and in many cases recruited from the local area and the nearby Reigate art school. From these drawings, Benton-pantographs were used to machine metal punches to stamp matrices. It was Monotype's standard practice at the time to first engrave a limited number of characters and print proofs from them to test overall balance of colour on the page, before completing the remaining characters.

Monotype's publicity team described the final italic as "fine, tranquil" in a 1931 showing, emphasising their desire to avoid a design that seemed too eccentric. It was, however, not the only design considered. Morison initially commissioned from the calligrapher Alfred Fairbank a nearly upright italic design based on the work of Arrighi, and considered using it as Bembo's companion italic before deciding it was too eccentric for this purpose. Monotype ultimately created a more conventional design influenced by Tagliente's typeface and sold Fairbank's design as Bembo Condensed Italic. It was digitised as "Fairbank" in 2003, and sold independently of Monotype's Bembo digitisations. Morison conceded in his memoir that the Fairbank design "looked its best when given sole possession of the page". Fairbank later complained that he had not been told that his italic was intended to be a complementary design, and that he would have designed it differently if he had been.

As was normal in metal type fonts of the period from Monotype and other companies, the font was drawn differently at different sizes by modifying Griffo's original single-size design, a quite large letter at an approximate size of 15 points. The changes made were looser spacing, higher x-height (taller lower-case letters) and a more solid colour of impression at smaller sizes, and a finer, more graceful and tightly spaced design at large sizes. (Note: As an example of how this scaling was carried out, experienced Linotype designer Chauncey Griffith commented some years later that in a type he was working on for newspapers, the 6 point size was not half as wide as the 12 point size but about 71% the width.)

== Characteristics ==
Comparison of two digitisations of Bembo in some of its more distinctive characters, with some other common book fonts.

Among Bembo's more distinctive characteristics, the capital "Q"'s tail starts from the glyph's centre, the uppercase "J" has a slight hook and the sides of the "M" splay outwards slightly. The 'A' has a flat top. Many lowercase letters show subtle, sinuous curves; the termination of the arm of both the r and the e flare slightly upward and outward. The lowercase "c" and "e" push slightly forwards. Characters "h", "m", and "n" are not quite vertical on their right-hand stems, with a subtle curve towards the left going down the stroke. (Note: In the digital period, Monotype designer Steve Matteson has noted that this characteristic is problematic for onscreen display on low-resolution screens.) In italic, the k has an elegantly curved stroke in the lower-right and descenders on the p, q and y end with a flat horizontal stroke. In the 1950s, Monotype noted that its features included: "serifs fine slab, fine-bracketed and in l.c. prolonged to right along baseline." This meant that many of the serifs (especially the horizontals, for example on the W) are fine lines of quite uniform width, rather than forming an obvious curve leading into the main form of the letter. The ascenders reach above the cap height.

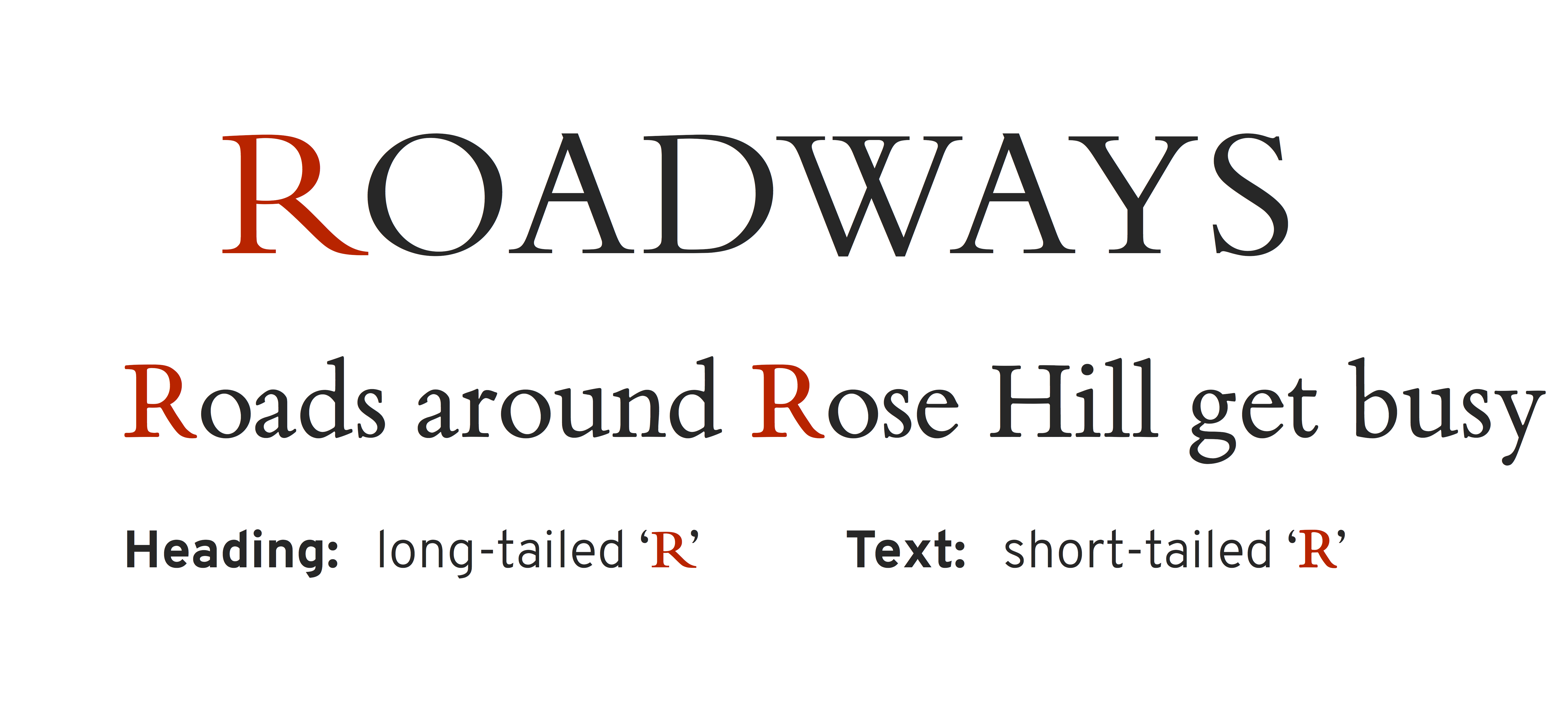
The two "R" designs of Bembo. Not all digitisations include both. (Note: For this image, the quite delicate "Bergamo" digitisation of Bembo from Fontsite is used for the heading, and the open-source ET Book for the body text. Monotype's Bembo Book digitisation is one of the few digital releases to include both styles.)

In metal type, Bembo includes two capital "R"s, one with a long, extended leg following Griffo's original engraving, and another with a more tucked-in leg for body text if a printer preferred it.

Bembo does not attempt to strictly copy all the features of Renaissance printing, instead blending them with a twentieth-century sensibility and the expectations of contemporary design. An eccentricity of Griffo's first De Aetna capitals was an asymmetrical M that does not seem to have a serif at top right. So odd it has been suggested it may have been the result of faulty casting of type, it was nonetheless often copied in French imitations by Garamond and his contemporaries. The final release of Monotype's revival did not follow this, although it was available by special order. (Note: An example specimen showing the alternative 'M' is the Neon Type Division catalogue of 1962. It was used in a British Museum exhibition catalogue.) Monotype also did not copy the curving capital Y used by Manutius in the tradition of the Greek letter upsilon which had been used in some versions of Poliphilus and Blado, although not in the digitisation of Poliphilus. (Note: A more muted form of it is used in Hermann Zapf's Palatino.) Nesbitt has described the capitals as "a composite design in the spirit of [Griffo's] type". Historian James Mosley reports that other changes from the earliest versions were reduction in the weight of the capitals and alteration of the 'G' by adding the conventional right-hand serif, and widening the 'e', and suggests that the numerals of Bembo were based on those Monotype had already developed for the typeface Plantin.

In the italic, the expansive ascenders of Tagliente's type were shortened and the curl to the right replaced with more conventional serifs. Monotype also cut italic capitals sloped to match the lower-case, whereas in the Renaissance italics were used with upright capital letters in the Roman inscriptional tradition. The bold (Monotype's invention, since Griffo and his contemporaries did not use bold type) is extremely solid, providing a very clear contrast to the regular styles, and Monotype also added lining (upper-case height) figures as well as the text figures (at lower-case height) used in the fifteenth and sixteenth centuries.

Book designer Elizabeth Friedländer drew some rarely-seen swash capitals for Bembo for capital introductions to Churchill's history of the second world war.

== Related fonts ==
=== Poliphilus and Blado ===
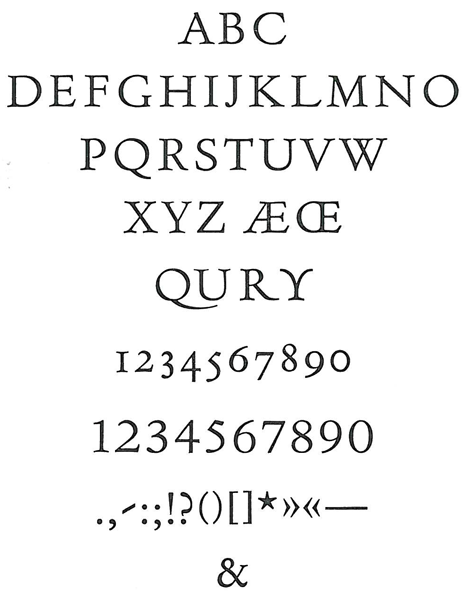
A specimen sheet of Monotype Poliphilus's capitals. Design includes an alternate 'palm Y' in the style of Manutius.

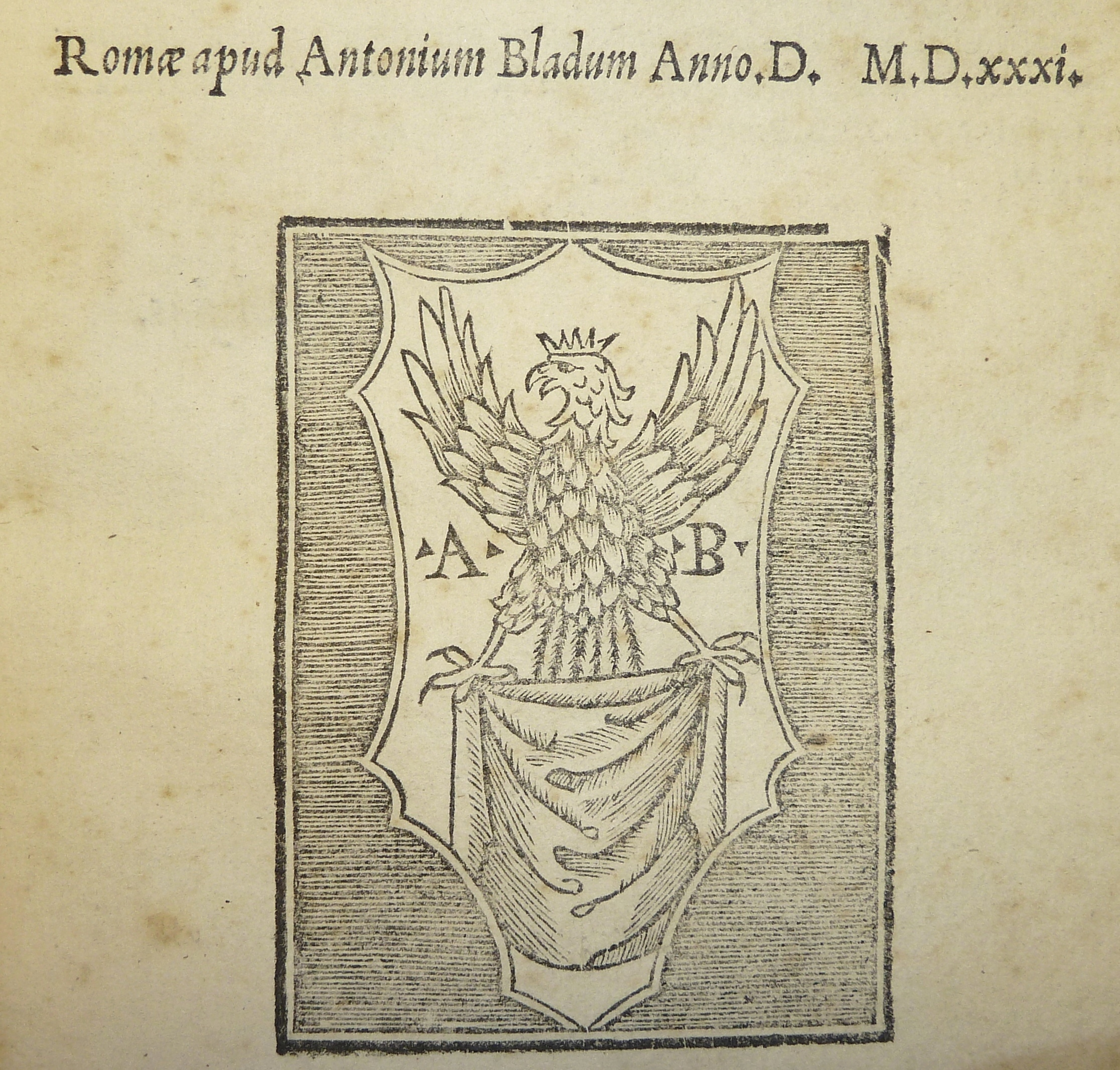
A book published by Antonio Blado in 1531, using italics as was normal in the period: lower-case italics, upper-case upright capitals. The modern concept of an italic using sloped capitals had not become popular at this point.

Monotype had already designed two other types inspired by the same period of Italian printing and calligraphy, the roman Poliphilus and italic Blado (both 1923). Made more eccentric and irregular than the sleek lines of Bembo to evoke the feel of antique printing, these remained in Monotype's catalogue and have been digitised, but are much less known today. Bembo can therefore be seen as an iteration of a preexisting design concept towards mass market appeal, taking the basic idea of the Griffo design and (unlike Poliphilus) updating its appearance to match the more sophisticated printing possible by the 1920s. Bembo's original working name was "Poliphilus Modernised".

Poliphilus is named after the book Hypnerotomachia Poliphili, one of Manutius's most famous books in the Latin alphabet, which was printed with the same roman as De Aetna but recut capitals; it was made for the Medici Society, who planned to create an English translation. Blado is named after the printer Antonio Blado, a colleague of Arrighi. Morison preferred Bembo's roman and was somewhat dismissive of Poliphilus. Unlike Bembo, both in metal featured a Greek-influenced Y with a curving head, as in the original.

=== Centaur ===
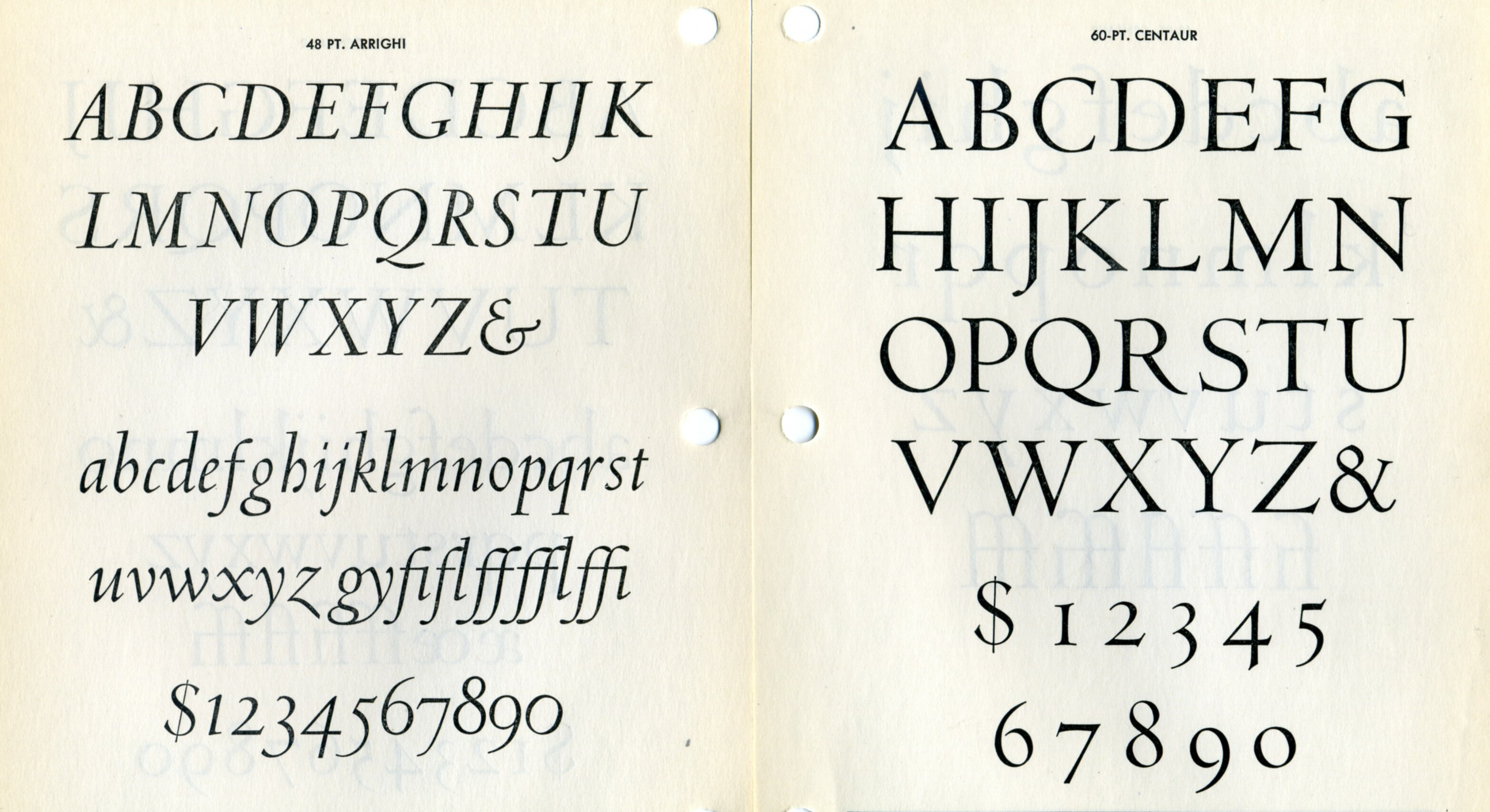
Arrighi & Centaur on a metal type specimen book, at a large size

Monotype licensed and released the font Centaur around the same time as Bembo. It was drawn by the American book designer Bruce Rogers. Its roman is based on a slightly earlier period of Italian renaissance printing than Bembo, the work of Nicolas Jenson in Venice around 1470. Like Bembo, its italic (by Frederic Warde) comes from the 1520s, being again loosely based on the work of Arrighi from around 1520. Compared to Bembo it is somewhat lighter in structure, something particularly true in its digital facsimile. (Note: Unlike Bembo, Centaur's first rather spindly digitisation was never augmented with a more text-oriented one, possibly because it is particularly commonly used in titles anyway.) Penguin often used it for headings and titles of 'classic' editions, particularly its capitals and italic; its lower-case does not so effectively harmonise with Bembo due to the different letter shapes such as the tilted 'e'.

=== Griffo and Dante ===
Although Bembo went on to dominate British book printing in the twentieth century, in the words of John Dreyfus "Morison was not entirely satisfied by the way Griffo's roman had been recut", feeling that "the real charm of the original had not been brought out in the mechanical recutting". His friend printer Giovanni Mardersteig made two attempts at designing an alternative revival for use in his fine printing house, the Officina Bodoni, first in discussion with Morison and cut by hand by punchcutter Charles Malin, who some years later had also cut a version of Perpetua for Morison. This more delicate "Griffo" revival (1929) was used in handprinting and not developed for use outside Mardersteig's company.

In the 1940s, Mardersteig developed plans for a second design, Dante, which was again cut by Malin slowly from 1946 onwards but taken also up by Monotype. Monotype Dante Series 592, Dante Semi Bold Series 682 and Dante Titling Series 612, were only produced in Didot-sizes. It was a more eccentric revival of the Aldine face than Bembo, it did not attract as much popularity.

=== Titling fonts ===
Monotype's Felix Titling font, based on humanist capitals designed by Felice Feliciano and inspired by Roman square capitals.

Monotype created several titling designs based on Renaissance printing that could be considered complementary to Bembo: Bembo Titling (based directly on Bembo's capitals, but more delicate to suit a larger text size) and the more geometric Felix Titling in 1934, inspired by humanist capitals drawn by Felice Feliciano in 1463. In the hot metal type era Monotype also issued a titling version of Centaur, which was often used by Penguin; Monotype's digitisations of Centaur do not include it.

== Timeline ==
=== The Renaissance ===
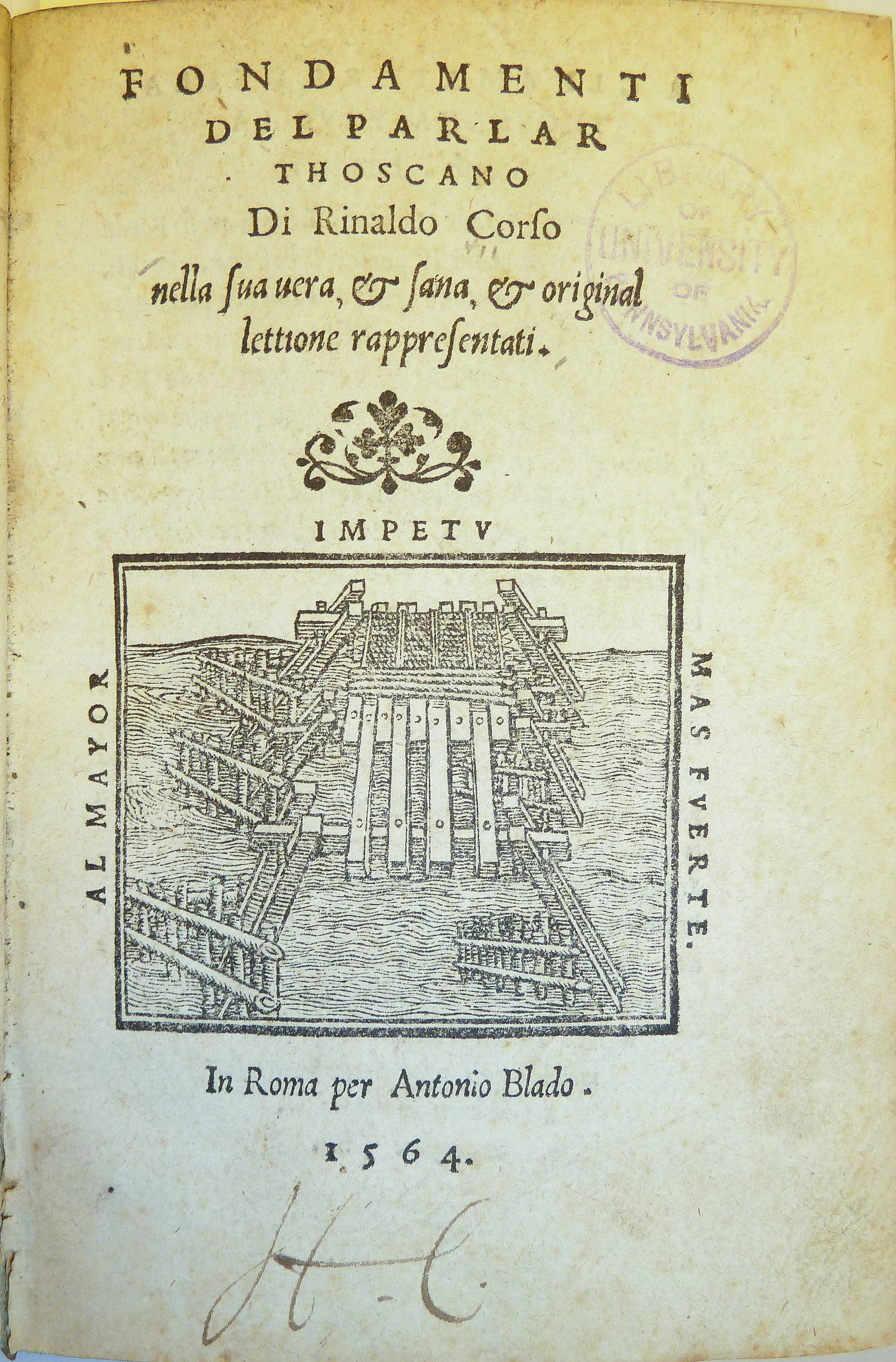
A title page printed in Rome by Antonio Blado in 1564, after the death of Griffo, Manutius, Arrighi and Tagliente.

- 1496 Griffo's roman
- 1501 Griffo's italic; development of italic type follows over the next fifty years.
- 1515 Death of Manutius.
- 1518 Death of Griffo.
- 1520s Tagliente publishes in Venice, Ludovico Vicentino degli Arrighi in Rome (possibly also Venice). Both are former calligraphers who publish writing manuals.
- 1522–25 Tagliente publishes a writing manual The True Art of Excellent Writing, as does Arrighi, La Operina... around the same time. (Note: Arrighi's book had a complex publication history apparently involving a dispute between Arrighi and his publisher, making its dating and printing location(s) both somewhat involved.) Arrighi's friend Gian Giorgio Trissino writes of Arrighi that "in calligraphy he has surpassed all other men of our age so [he now does] in print all that was formerly done with the pen, in his beautiful types he has gone beyond all other printers." His contemporary Antonio Blado publishes in Rome in an italic apparently derived from Arrighi's work.
- 1527 War in central Italy. Arrighi disappears from history; he may have been killed in the Sack of Rome.
- 1528 Tagliente dies in Venice.
- 1535 Blado appointed printer to the papacy and remains in this role until his death in 1567.
- 1530s–1550s France becomes a centre of the typefounding industry under the influence of the work of Manutius and others. French typefaces replace old Italian designs at the Aldine Press in Venice. Tradition that italic capitals should slope like the lower case established.

=== 20th century ===
- 1910s The italic calligraphy style of the Italian renaissance is revived by calligraphers including Edward Johnston and Alfred Fairbank.
- 1923 Monotype releases Monotype series 119, an italic based on the work of Arrighi and Antonio Blado, and Poliphilus Monotype series 170, a roman based on the work of Griffo.
- 1926 Edward Johnston develops a font based on his italic calligraphy, but it remains obscure.
- 1926 Frederic Warde creates an italic based on the work of Arrighi. Monotype series 252 It is now almost always used as the companion italic of the font Centaur, but initially had an independent existence.
- 1928–29 Monotype develops and releases Bembo, Monotype series 270 based on the work of Griffo but much smoother in texture. After considering releasing an italic by Fairbank-based the work of Arrighi, Monotype abandons the idea, making Bembo's default italic on the Tagliente model. Hot metal matrices for Fairbank's italic or "Bembo Condensed Italic" Monotype series 294 were only made in 4 sizes: 10pt, 12pt, 13pt and 16pt.
- 1929 Monotype releases Centaur and the Warde italic as a matching set.
- 1960s Monotype releases Bembo for phototypesetting. Other companies also release versions.

== Reception ==
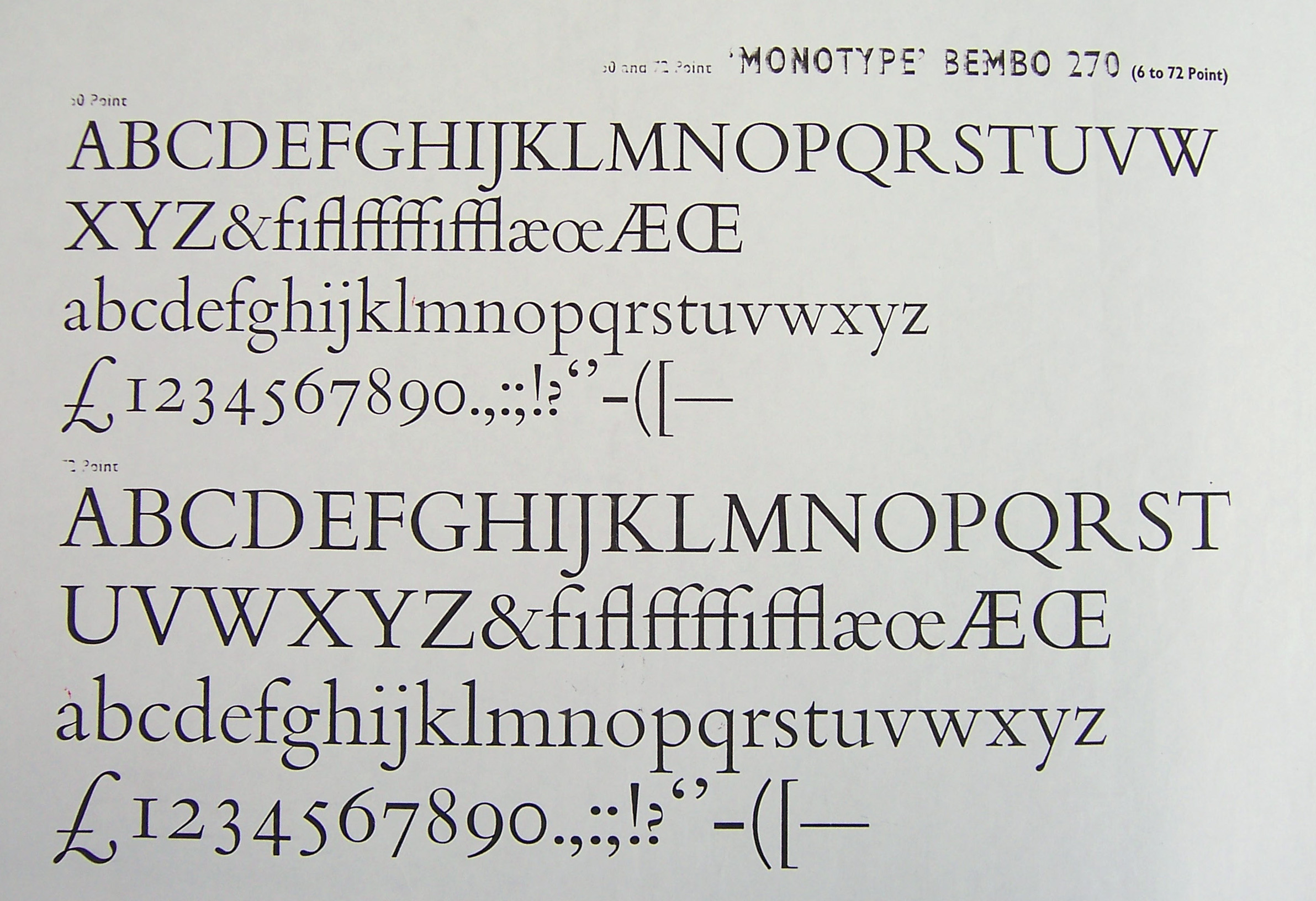
Two larger sizes of Bembo, at 60 and 72 pt. Different drawings were used in the metal type period at sizes larger than 24 point, and the greater delicacy is clear. In addition, ascenders such as the f stand far above the cap line.

Bembo has been very popular in book publishing, particularly in Britain. It was also recommended by HMSO in its style guide for outsourced printing jobs. Cambridge University Press's history describes Bembo as one of its most commonly used typefaces; Morison was closely connected to Cambridge and his personal archive (as well as much of Monotype's) went to the university after his death.

Among reviews of typefaces, writing in the anthology Typographic Specimens: The Great Typefaces, Jeff Price commented that Bembo became noted for its ability to "provide a text that is extremely consistent in colour", helping it to "remain one of the most popular book types since its release". Roger Black commented in 1983 "For me, Bembo is the all-time classic roman; if I were stuck on a desert island with only one typeface, that would be it." Digital font designer Nick Shinn has also commented, "Bembo has a sleek magnificence, born of high-precision technology at the service of accomplished production skills, which honours the spirit of the original, and an exotic grace of line which humbles most new designs made more ostensibly for the new technology." Oxford University Press editor John Bell also borrowed the name for his set of comic verse lampooning publishing, Mutiny on the Bembo.

== Digitisations and derivatives ==
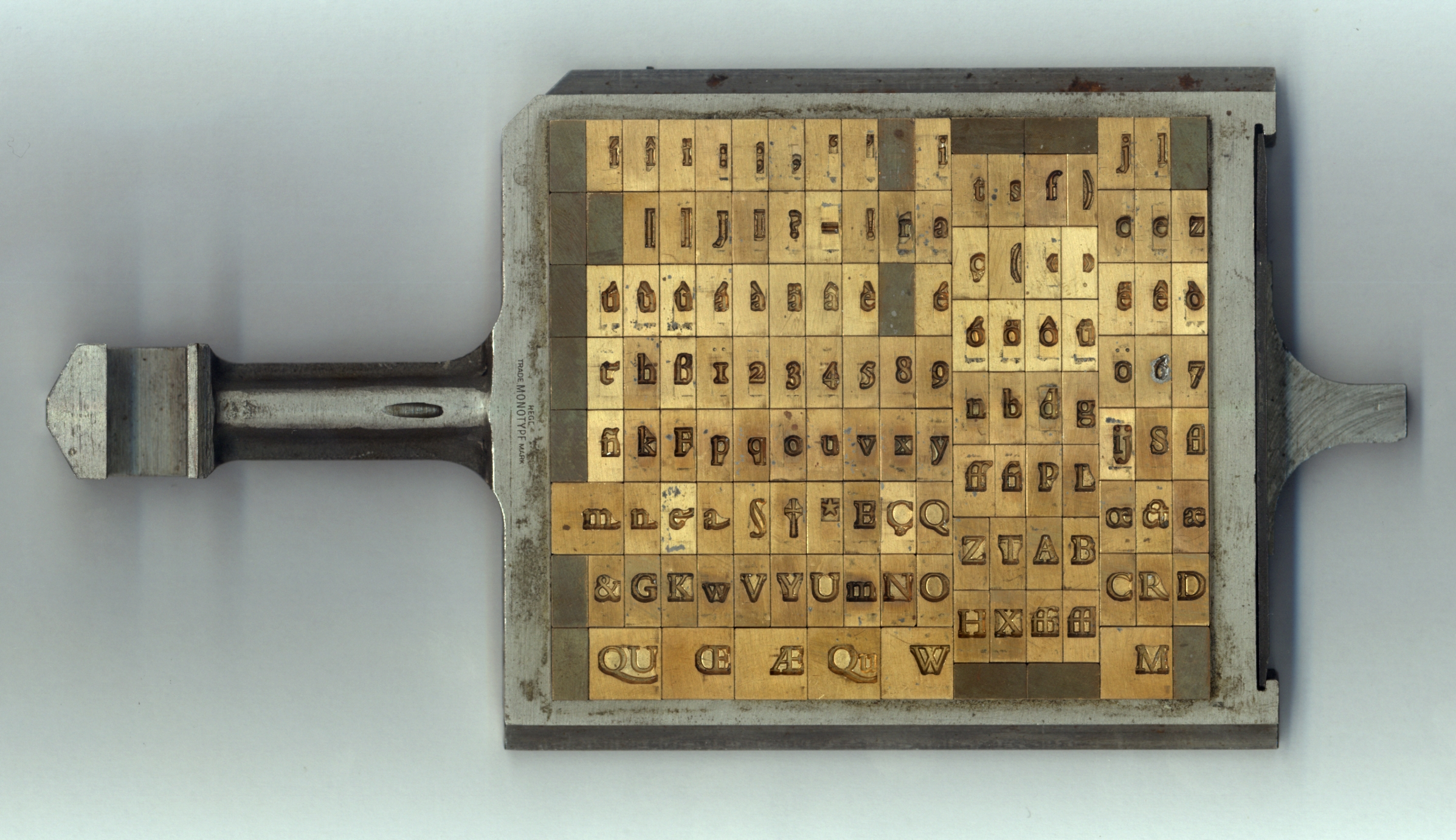
Large composition matrix-case with Bembo 270-16 roman, prepared for casting with a standard wedge S5-13.75 set. Hot metal typesetting systems cast type using machine-made matrices under the control of a keyboard.

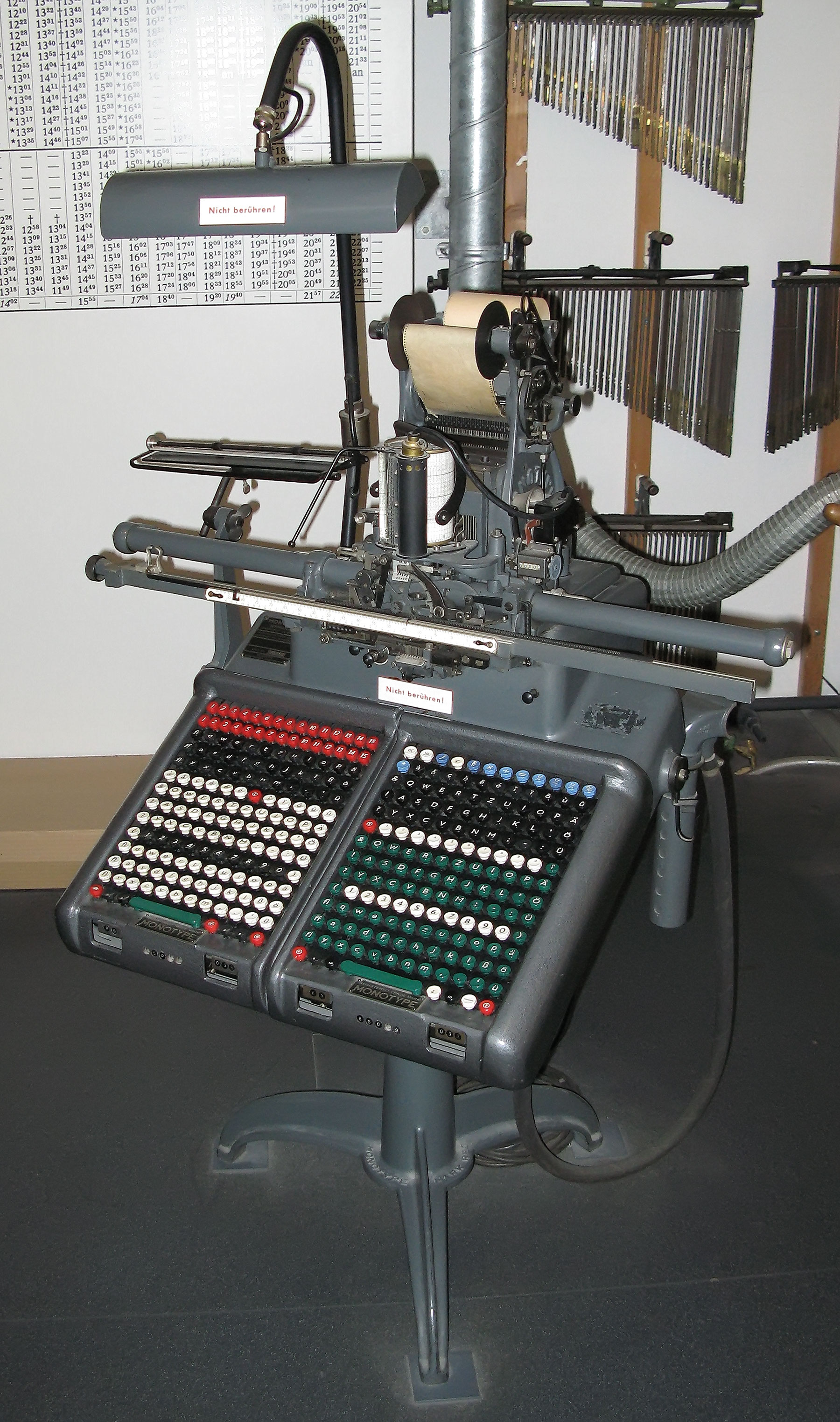
A Monotype machine keyboard; the characters to be printed are recorded on a paper reel at the top.

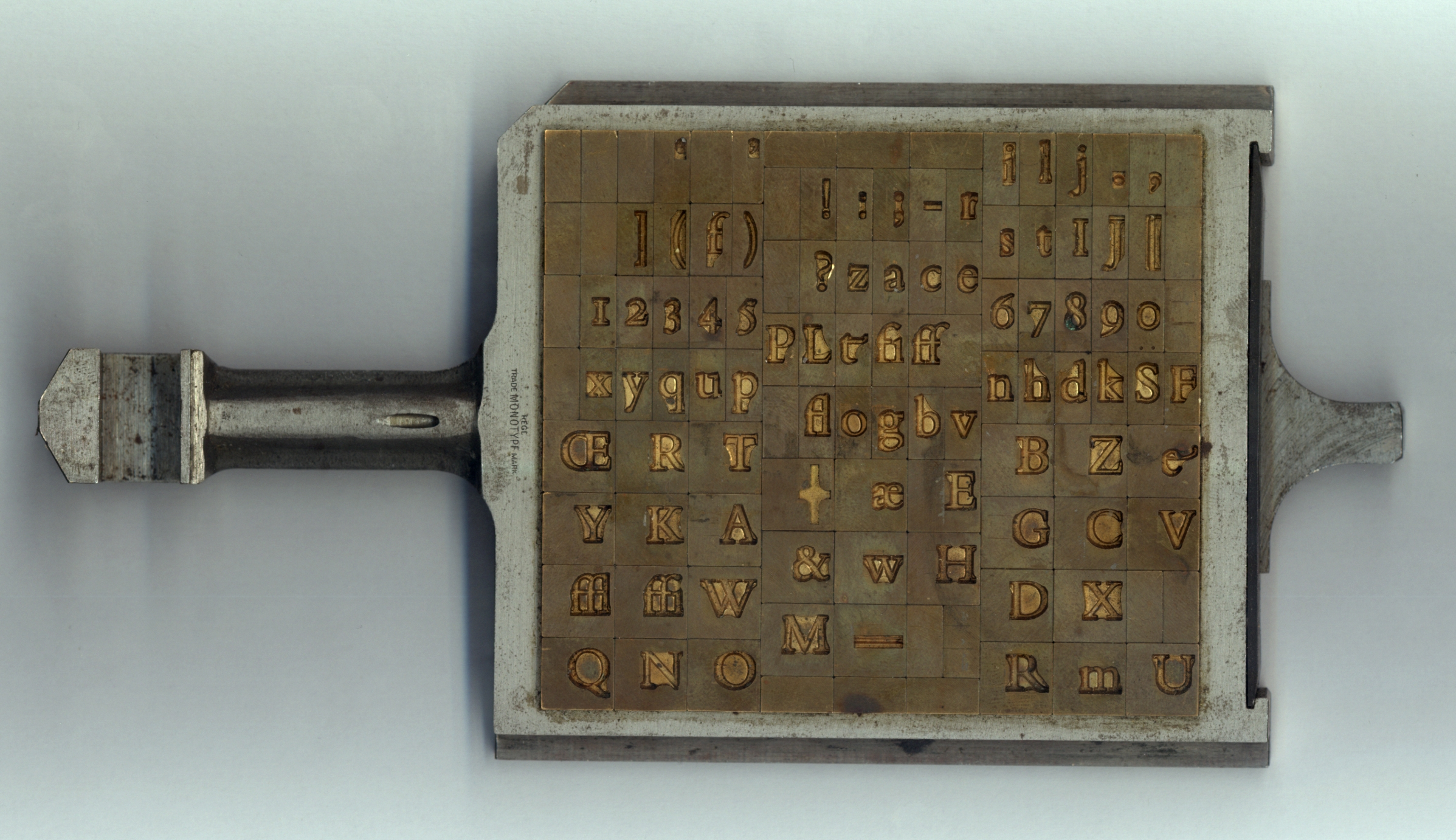
Large composition matrix-case with Bembo 270-24 pt roman, 19.5 set

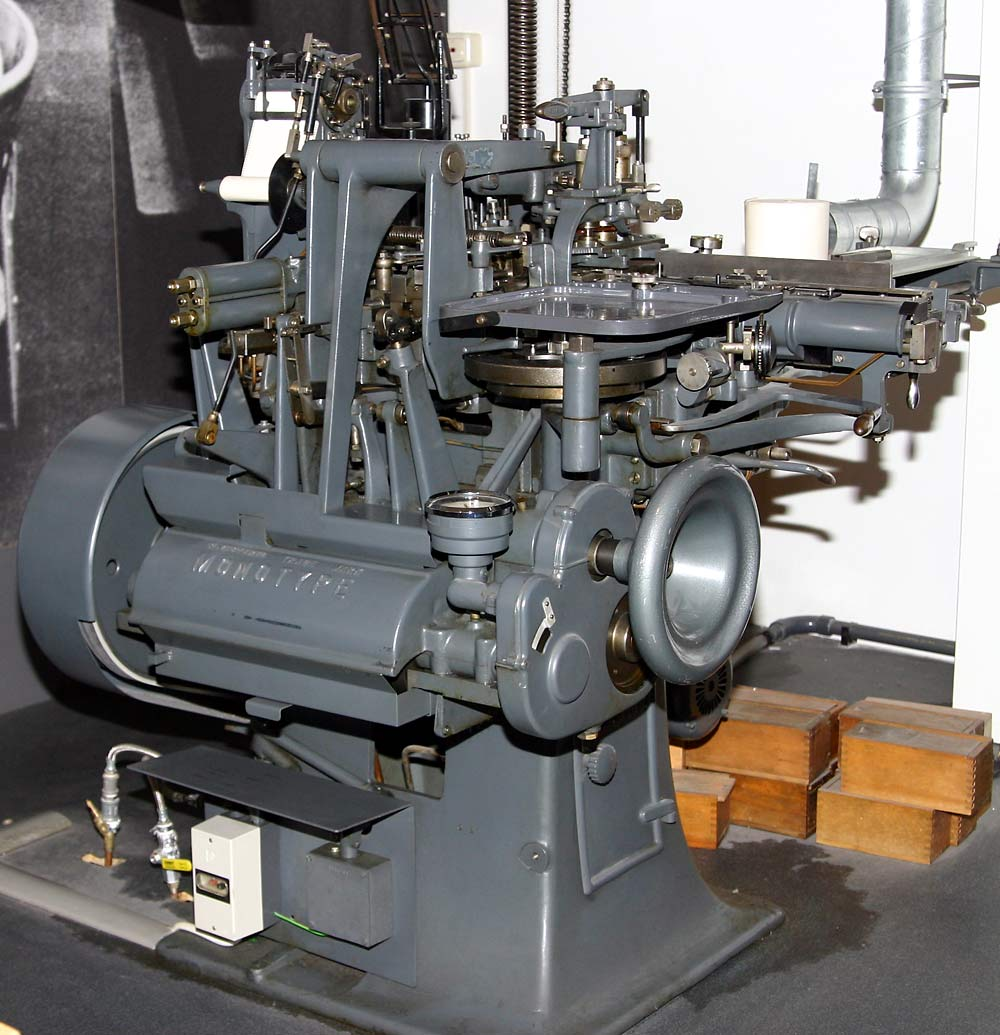
A Monotype caster, used to cast metal type.

=== Monotype digitisations ===
Monotype has released two separate digitisations named Bembo and more recently Bembo Book, as well as the more slender caps-only display font Bembo Titling and the alternate italic design Fairbank. Bembo Book is considered to be superior by being thicker and more suitable for body text, as well as for offering the alternate shorter R for better-spaced body text.

Monotype's original, early digitisation of Bembo was widely seen as unsuccessful. Two main problems have been cited with it: being digitised from drawings, it was much lighter in type colour than the original metal type which gained weight through ink spread, much reduced on modern printing equipment. In addition, the digital Bembo was based on the 9-pt metal drawings, creating a font with different proportions to the metal type in the point sizes at which Bembo was most often used in books; Sebastian Carter has pointed particularly to the 'M' being drawn too wide. This made the proportions of the digital font appear wrong, failing to match the subtlety of the metal type and phototypesetting release, which was released in three different optical sizes for different print sizes. (Note: Many early typeface digitisations now look too light even when they were digitised from the original metal type drawings. The type was made lighter than the desired appearance on paper to take account of the fact that the ink would spread as it soaked into the paper. However, modern printing methods show less ink spread than metal type.) Future Monotype executive Akira Kobayashi commented that the original digitisation was "a kind of compromise ... the types that were originally designed for hot-metal often looked too light and feeble ... Bembo Book is more or less what I expected."

While Bembo Book is considered the superior digitisation, the original continues to offer the advantages of two extra weights (semi- and extra-bold) and infant styles with simplified a and g characters that resemble handwriting; its lighter appearance may also be of use on printing equipment with greater ink spread. Cross-licensing has meant that it is sold by a range of vendors, often at very low prices. As an example of this, Fontsite obtained the rights to resell a derivative of the original digitisation, using the alternative name Borgia and Bergamo, upgrading it by additional OpenType features such as small capitals and historical alternative characters. Neither version includes digitisations of the larger size versions of Bembo, which had a more delicate and elegant design.

=== Other Griffo-inspired fonts ===
A major professional competitor to Bembo is Agmena, created by Jovica Veljović and released by Linotype in 2014. Intended as a unified serif design supporting Roman, Greek and a range of Cyrillic alphabets such as Serbian, it features a more calligraphic italic than Bembo with swash capitals and support for Greek ligatures.

A looser interpretation of the Griffo designs is Iowan Old Style, designed by John Downer and also released by Bitstream. With a larger x-height (taller lower-case letters) than the print-oriented Bembo and influences of signpainting (Downer's former profession), it was intended to be particularly clear for reading at distance, in displays and in signage. It is a default font in the Apple Books application.

Not explicitly influenced by Bembo but also influenced by Griffo is Minion by Slimbach. Released by Adobe, a 2008 survey ranked it as one of the most popular typefaces used in modern fine printing.

Besides designs with similar inspiration, a number of more direct copies and digitisations of Bembo have been made, both in the phototypesetting and digital periods. As "Bembo" is a Monotype trademark, these versions were released under alternate names; for example one unofficial phototypesetting version was named "Biretta" after the hat worn by Roman Catholic clergy, and another by Erhard Kaiser was created for the East German printing concern Typoart. In the digital period, Rubicon created a version named "Bentley" intended for small sizes and Bitstream made a version under the name of "Aldine 401". Its licensee ParaType later created a set of Cyrillic characters for this in 2008.

=== Free and open-source fonts ===
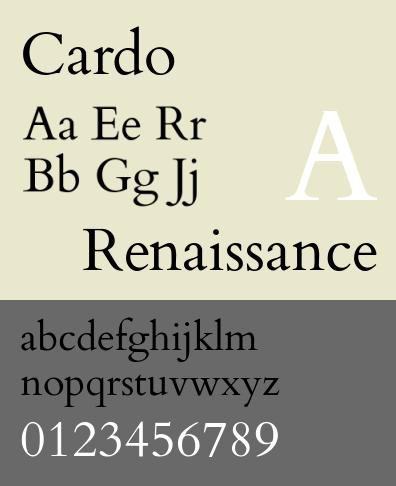
The Cardo font is based on Bembo.

Two open-source designs based on Bembo are Cardo and ET Book. The Cardo fonts, developed by David J. Perry for use in classical scholarship and also including Greek and Hebrew, are freely available under the SIL Open Font License. Unimpressed by the first Bembo digitisation, statistician and designer Edward Tufte commissioned an alternative digitisation for his books in a limited range of styles and languages, sometimes called 'ET Bembo'. He released it publicly under the MIT License as an open-source font named 'ET Book' in September 2015. In 2019, Daniel Benjamin Miller released XETBook (extended ET Book) under the SIL OFL. XETBook then was further developed into ETbb by Michael Sharpe, which is available under the LaTeX Project Public License on CTAN.

=== Privately used fonts ===
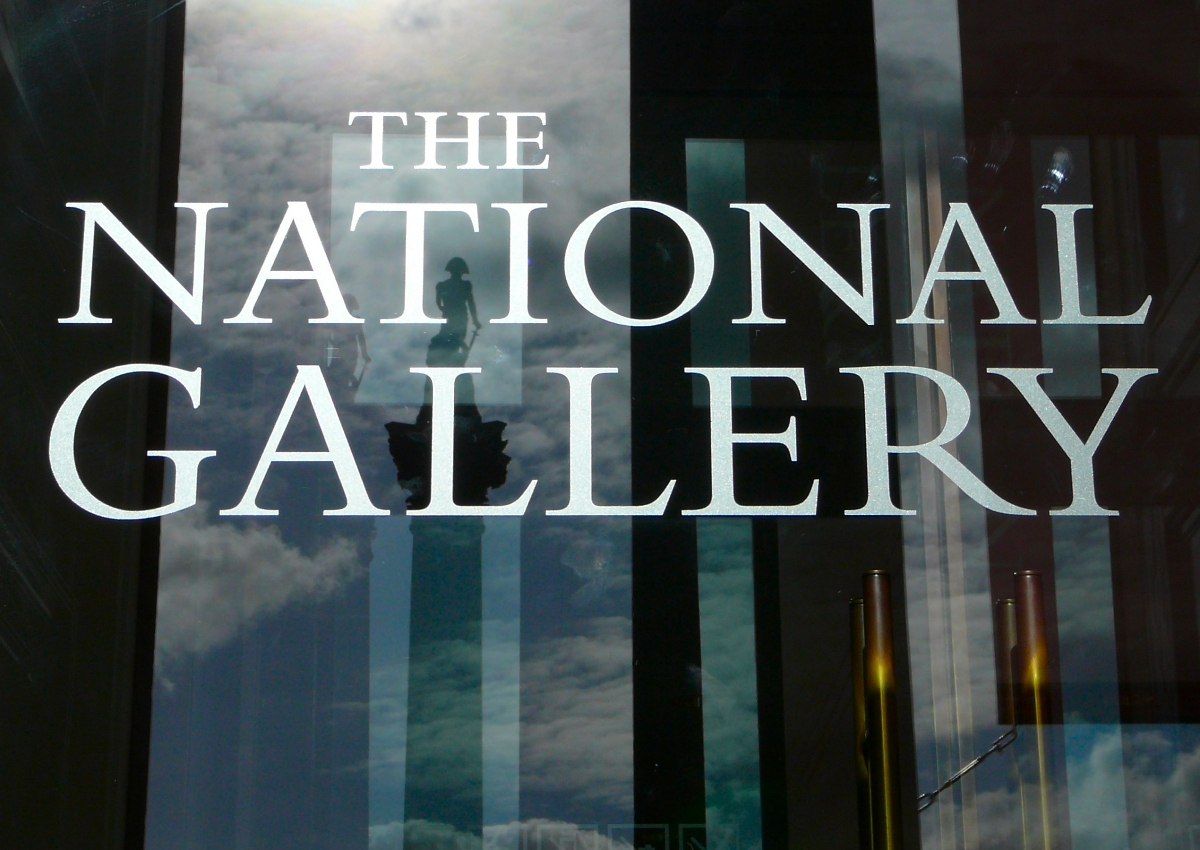
The National Gallery of London's wordmark is based on Bembo.

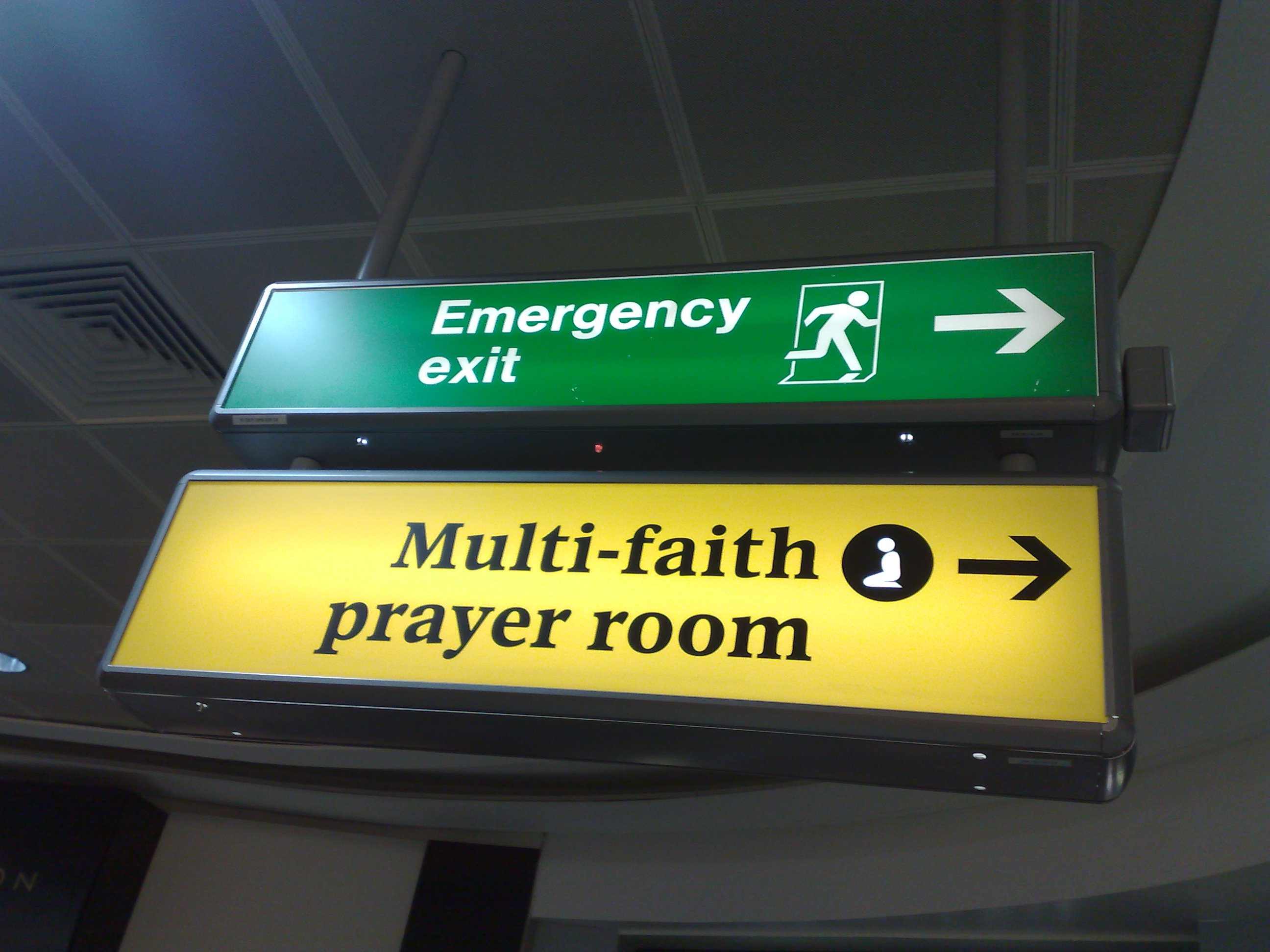
A sign at Heathrow in BAA Bembo

Heathrow and other British airports used a highly divergent adaptation of Bembo for many years. Designed by Shelley Winters and named BAA Bembo or BAA Sign, it was very bold with a high x-height.

The National Gallery in London used Bembo, then its corporate font, as a plan for the carving of its name into its frontage.

The Yale face, developed by Matthew Carter as a corporate font for Yale University, is based on Griffo's work; Yale commissioned a custom font from Carter, a member of the university faculty, after being dissatisfied with digital versions of Bembo. Carter commented on the design that "John Gambell, the Yale University printer who initiated and ran the project, also liked the idea of an Aldine face ... Monotype Bembo had been used for University printing at an earlier time, so there was a useful precedent." It is available exclusively to "Yale students, employees, and authorized contractors for use in Yale publications and communications. It may not be used for personal or business purposes, and it may not be distributed to non-Yale personnel."

In the pre-digital period, IBM offered Aldine, a font inspired by Bembo, as a font for the IBM Composer. This was an ultra-premium electric golfball typewriter system, intended for producing copy to be photographically enlarged for small-scale printing projects, or for high-quality office documents. Ultimately the system proved a transitional product, as it was displaced by cheaper phototypesetting, and then in the 1980s by word processors and general-purpose computers.

== See also ==
- Antiqua
- History of Western typography
- Typography
