= Ron Carpenter =

Ron Carpenter may refer to:

- Ron Carpenter (linebacker) (born 1941), American football player
- Ron Carpenter (defensive lineman) (born 1948), American football player
- Ron Carpenter (designer) (born 1950), British typographer
- Ron Carpenter (defensive back) (born 1970), American football player
