= Francesco Griffo =

15th-century Italian punchcutter

Francesco Griffo (1450–1518), also called Francesco da Bologna, was a fifteenth-century Italian punchcutter, born in Bologna. He worked for Aldus Manutius, designing the printer's more important humanist typefaces, including the first italic type. He cut Roman, Greek, Hebrew and the first italic type. Aldus gives Griffo credit in the introduction of the Virgil of 1501. However, as Manutius had achieved a monopoly on italic printing and Greek publishing with the permission of the Venetian government, he had a falling-out with Griffo. Griffo then went to work for Gershom Soncino, whose family were Hebrew printers. It was with Soncino that Griffo's second italic type was cut in 1503. In 1516 he returned to Bologna where he began print publishing. In 1518 Griffo was charged with the murder of his son-in-law, who had been beaten to death with an iron bar. This is his last appearance in the historical record. He is presumed to have been executed.

== Influence ==
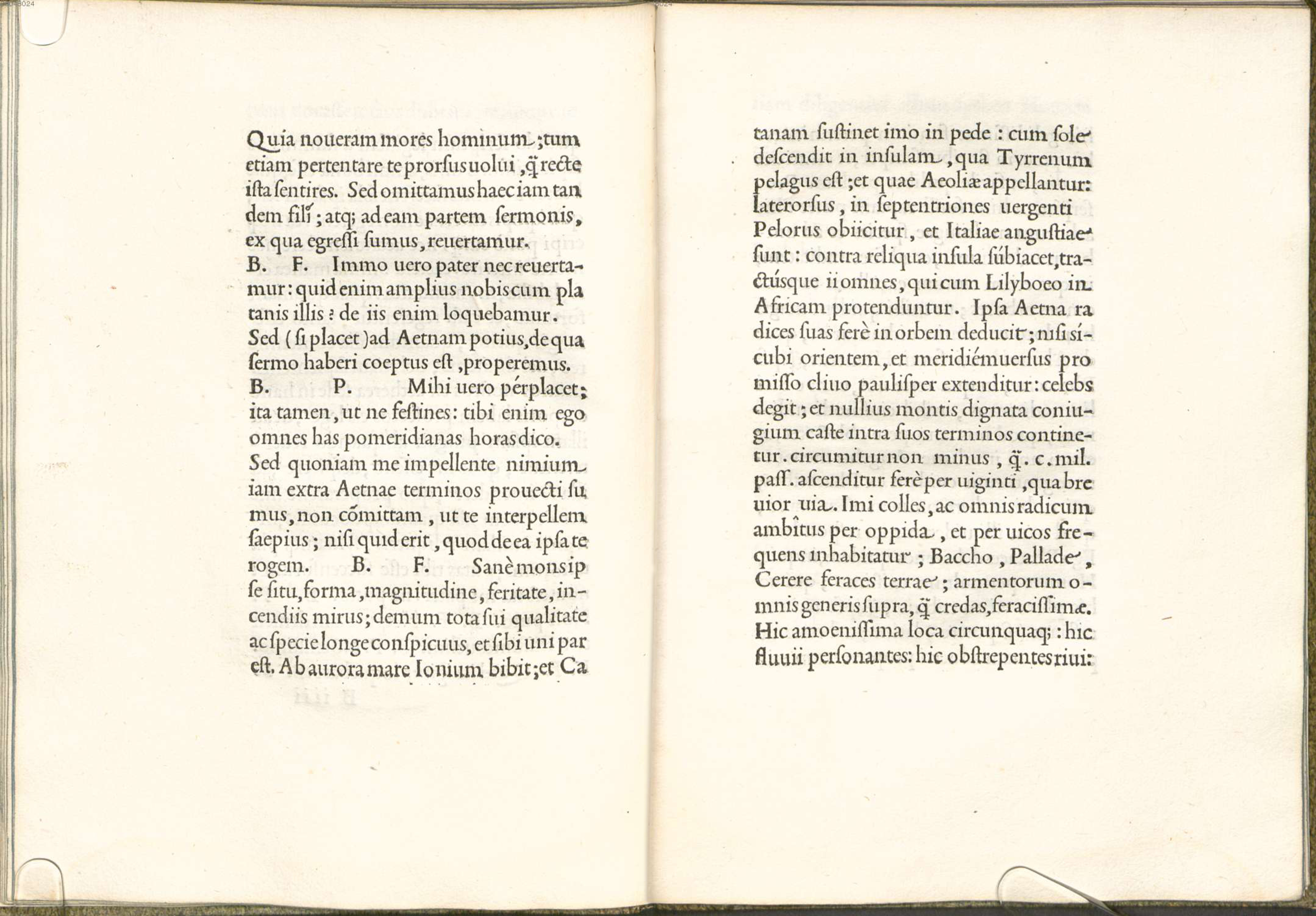
De Aetna 1495

Griffo's typefaces have been very influential. His Romans show a degree of abstraction from calligraphy not present in the work of the earlier master Nicolas Jenson, while his italic and Greek types are notably cursive. Philip B. Meggs wrote in A History of Graphic Design, "Griffo researched pre-Caroline scripts to produce a roman type that was less artistic but more authentic than Jenson's designs". The italic type was designed to look like handwriting of the humanist scholars. This more personal form of type became widely popular in Europe.

Typefaces based on his work include Monotype Poliphilus roman, Bembo Book roman, Bembo Titling, Morris Fuller Benton's Cloister Old Style italic, Jack Yan's JY Aetna roman, Bitstream Aldine 401 roman, and Franko Luin's Griffo Classico roman and italic; more distant descendants include the romans of Claude Garamond, Giovanni Mardersteig's Dante, Robert Slimbach's Minion and Matthew Carter's Yale Typeface.

== Publications ==
The publications of Francesco Griffo's at Bologna as cited by Francesco Griffo da Bologna: Fragments & glimpses: a compendium of information & opinions about his life and work.

- Canzoniere et triomphi di messer Francesco Petrarcha, 20 September 1516.
- Archadia del Sannazaro, 3 October 1516.
- Gli Asolani di Messer Pietro Bembo, 30 October 1516.
- Labirinto d amore de Messer Giovanni Bocaccio nomato il Corbaccio, 9 December 1516.
- M. Tull. Ciceronis Epistolae familiares accuratius recognitae, 20 December 1516.
- Volerii Maximi dictorum et factorum memorabilium libri nouem, 24 January 1517.
