= Ron Carpenter (designer) =

English typographer (born 1950)

Ron Carpenter (born 1950 in Dorking) is an English typographer. He was trained as a cartographer and later became a typeface designer. He works for independent font foundry, Dalton Maag.

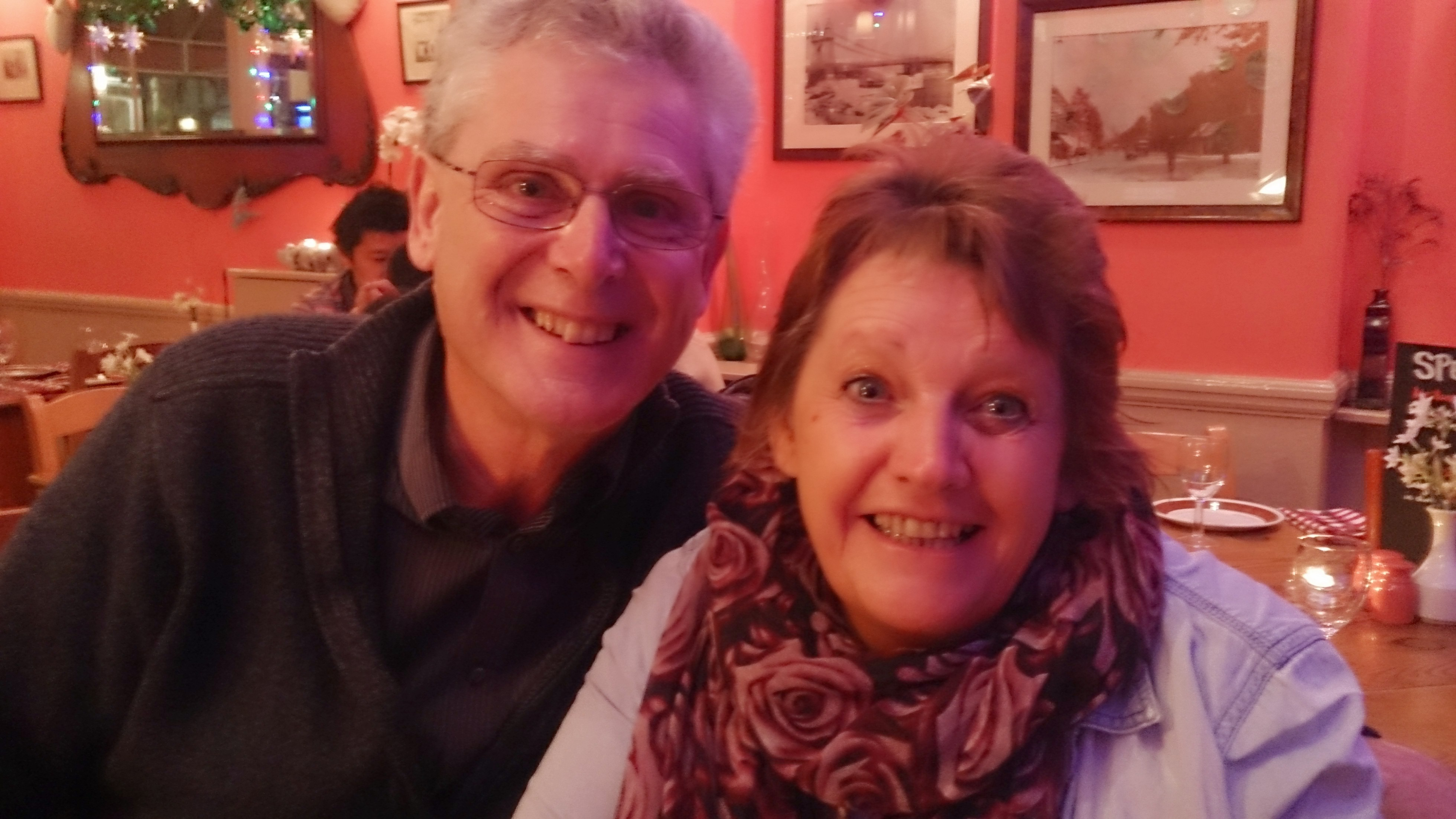
Carpenter and his wife Julie

== Early life ==
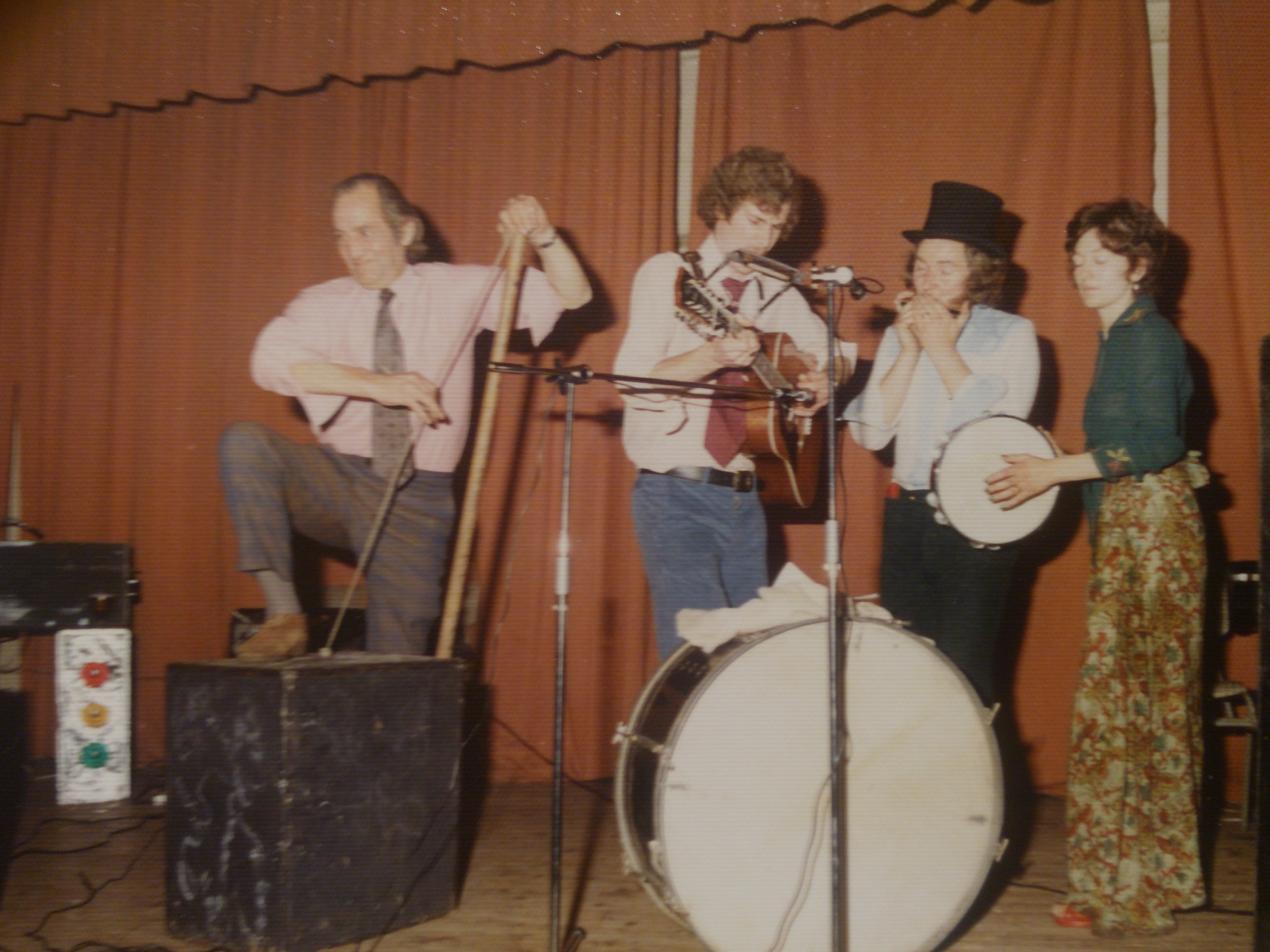
Carpenter, second from left, performing with his band

Carpenter grew up in the village of Brockham, Surrey, as the younger of two brothers born to George and Audrey Carpenter. He attended Brockham Village School before finishing his studies at Sondes Place School.

== Career ==
Out of school at the age of 16, Carpenter trained as a cartographer. His work involved the surveying for and hand drawing of Ordnance Survey maps. During this time he developed an interest in typography and obtained a job at Monotype.

In 1986, Carpenter designed and developed the font, Calisto MT, an old style serif. The Calisto face is intended to function as both a text and display face.

After leaving Monotype in 1992, he worked for a time as a freelance typographer before joining Bruno Maag in his start-up company Dalton Maag.

== Personal life ==
In 1979—at a Christmas Eve party in the local Brockham Village Hall—he was introduced to the sister of one of his friends, Julie. After a lengthy engagement he married Julie in 1990; together they moved into a flat in Reigate, before buying a house shortly before their first and only son, Morgan was born in 1992.

== Fonts ==
Carpenter has designed the following type fonts: Cantoria (1986), Calisto, Amasis (1992), Dante (1993). He has also designed Aktiv Grotesk, Co, Kings Caslon, Lexia, Plume, Stroudley and Viato as part of his design work for Dalton Maag.
