= Kirti N. Chaudhuri =

Indian historian

Kirti Narayan Chaudhuri (born 8 September 1934) is a historian, author, writer, graphic artist, and lately, a film-maker. He is the second son of the Indian writer Nirad C. Chaudhuri. Chaudhuri has spent most of his adult life travelling and working in the Middle East, North Africa, South America, and Europe. He is a member of the British Academy and the Academia Europaea. Chaudhuri was ranked Number 58 on The Daily Telegraph's list of the "Top 100 Living Geniuses".

He is the author of several historical monographs, over thirty artist's books and the director of twelve feature films.

== Early life and education ==
Chaudhuri was born in Calcutta and spent his childhood in Kolkata and Delhi. In his early life, he was also a pianist and a general musician. He sat for the entrance examination for the University of London and studied history at the School of Oriental and African Studies, University College London, Birkbeck College, and the London School of Economics. His teachers included Arthur Llewellyn Basham, Cyril Philips, William G. Beasley, C. R. Boxer, Bernard Lewis, Eric Hobsbawm, G.J. Renier, Michael Oakeshott, and Karl Popper. Chaudhuri graduated with first-class honours in 1959 and was awarded the Derby Fellowship for Doctoral Research Studies.

Chaudhuri completed his PhD in 1961, in just over two years. His dissertation was on the early history of the English East India Company. He was immediately offered a position at the University of London and became a lecturer, reader, and professor of economic history.

== Academic career ==
Chaudhuri's first monograph The English East India Company: the Study of an Early Joint Stock Company 1600–1640, was published in 1965, and it is still regarded as one of the seminal works on the history of the East India Company since W.R. Scott published his classic three volume work in 1912. After the publication of the monograph, Chaudhuri began in 1966 a major research project on the later history of the East India Company. It was supported by a substantial research grant from UK Social Science Research Council. British economic historian Sir John Habakkuk, chairman of the SSRC, personally expressed his appreciation and support for Chaudhuri’s still-unproven research and methodology. The research grant enabled Chaudhuri to computerise the vast array of quantitative data on the Company’s transcontinental trade and shipping. The research was published by the Cambridge University Press in 1978 under the title The Trading World of Asia and the English East India Company 1660–1760. The Cambridge University Press reprinted the work in 2006. The methodology of the book was based on computerised data processing and rigorous statistical methods and systems analysis. This provided historians with a wide range of reliable statistical data on early modern trade and shipping, and Chaudhuri's conclusions point to the way early modern capitalism and business methods developed in Europe and the Indian Ocean. Economic History Net described the book as one of the most significant works in twentieth century economic history.

In 1980, the Cambridge University Press commissioned Chaudhuri to write a two-volume work on the history of the Indian Ocean similar in scope and narrative to the work of the French historian Fernand Braudel. Chaudhuri was profoundly influenced by Braudel's approach and remained in close touch with the French historian until the latter's death in 1985. The Cambridge University Press contract led to the publication in 1985 of The Trade and Civilisation in Indian Ocean from the Rise of Islam to 1750 and Asia before Europe in 1990.

Whereas Trade and Civilisation mainly follows the traditional descriptive method of a historian, Asia before Europe is a study, using mathematical set theory, of the dynamic interaction between economic life, society, and civilisation in the regions around and beyond the Indian Ocean during the period from the rise of Islam to 1750. It raises and answers the question how the identity of different Asian civilisations is established in the first place and then goes on to examine the structural features of food habits, clothing, architectural styles, and housing. The analysis of the different modes of economic production is followed by a description of the role of crop raising, pastoral nomadism, industrial activities, and the history of urbanisation for the main regions of the Indian Ocean. The book also presents a distinctive theory of comparative history. An extension of Fernand Braudel's theory of time and space, the methodology sets out precisely the logical foundation of the historical perceptions of unities and disunities, continuities, ruptures, and thresholds. The analysis of the historical evidence leads to the conclusion that Indian Ocean societies were united or separated from one another by a conscious cultural and linguistic identity. Below this surface level of awareness was a deeper structure of unities created by a common ecology, technology of economic production, traditions of government, theory of political obligations rights, and shared historical experience. The theory makes it possible to show that the name or the linguistic sign "Indian Ocean" is an arbitrary construction with a narrow range of meaning: the real Indian Ocean was an area which extended historically from the Red Sea and the Persian Gulf to the sea which lies beyond Japan. The "axiom of choice" in mathematical set theory is used to show that even the great deserts of Asia can be included in the "set" Indian Ocean through the logic of dialectical opposition.

=== Criticism and impact ===
Santhi Hejeebu, of the Department of Economics at the University of Iowa, in her general critique of the Trading World of Asia and English East India Company, commented on the use of systems theory to describe the East India Company: “He writes of the Company as a trading system, one in which the decision-rules employed by management can be mapped to a sequence of physical inputs and outputs, suggesting the Company operated like an engine." She noted that the use of systems theory was unusual approach to organisational analysis, though it could still be useful to economic history, particularly when you need to understand the details of a very complex operation. The gargantuan task of synthesising the thousands of volumes of records pertaining to the Company over the period indeed required a coherent approach embedded in a structural model of the Company's various operations.

“The drawback to systems theory is that it is a static model of the organization and it therefore offers no guidance on how to ask the deeper questions about efficiency or organizational change. Writes Chaudhuri, 'For a model cannot without destroying itself take account of the passage of time which affects its structural boundaries and parameters'. Theories of institutional change are of fundamental concern and those that are not amenable to changes over time appear to have little explanatory power. Thus while useful as an organising heuristic, systems analysis seems rather unlikely to yield insights regarding organizational change.”

Clive Dewey noted that the Trading World of Asia "represented the work of a lifetime, not only—or even mainly—in the sense that it took a significant proportion of [the author's] working life to write, but in the sense that such a book is only likely to be written once in a lifetime." Ten productive years of archival work (involving English, French, Dutch, and Belgian sources) went into the production of Trading World of Asia.

Dewey goes on to write, “The book influenced numerous literatures within economics and history. Chaudhuri's emphasis on the efficiency of the East India Company resonates in the literature on the origins of the multinational organization and on the character of the English chartered companies. While Chaudhuri used systems theory, others (Anderson et al. 1983 and Carlos and Nicholas, 1988) have employed transactions cost analysis, agency theory, and Chandlerian analysis of firm structure to argue that the East India Company was an organizational innovation on par with a modern multinational firm such as General Motors. They emphasize the efficacy of the firm's internal operations as its main commercial legacy. They de-emphasize the firm's imperial legacy. Other studies by contrast have highlighted the significance of "merchant empires" to European expansion. These works have also drawn on Chaudhuri's insights."

On Asia before Europe, Sugata Bose, Gardiner Professor of History at Harvard University, wrote: “Yet it remains an open question whether the recourse to mathematical precision fares much better than a historian’s intuitive presumptions in resolving the problem of the spatial limits of an interregional arena of human interaction.”

In 1991, Chaudhuri was invited to become the first Vasco da Gama Professor of the History of European Expansion at the European University Institute in Florence, Italy, with the support of the Portuguese National Commission for Maritime Discoveries. Chaudhuri completed his contract in 1999 and has returned to his earlier activities as a creative writer and an artist.

Chaudhuri was elected to the British Academy (1990), the Royal Historical Society (1993), and Academia Europaea (1994). The Portuguese government and National Commission for Discoveries awarded him the Don John de Castro Prize in International History (1994).

== Later literary and artistic works ==
In 1994, Kirti Chaudhuri founded Gallery Schifanoia and its associated imprint house Schifanoia Firenze to exhibit, print, and publish his artistic and literary works along with the works of other artists and writers. The chance purchase of two rare books, the facsimile edition of the Calligraphic Models of Ludovico Degli Arrighi surnamed Vicento (1525) and the Socratic dialogue Crito by Plato, hand printed by Hans Mardersteig in Montagnola in 1926, led Chaudhuri to the idea of founding a printing and publishing enterprise similar to Mardersteig’s Officina Bodoni, which was later transferred to Verona and joined to the letter-press printing house Stamperia Valdonega. The press has published thirty titles so far and further projects are being planned for future publication. The activities of Schifanoia Firenze as a private press and a publishing house belong to the same genre and the tradition created by Ambroise Vollard at the beginning of the twentieth century, a tradition that was actively taken up by other art dealers and art publishers such as Daniel Henry Kahnweiler, Albert Skira, Tériade, and Fabiani.

Schifanoia Firenze has tried to maintain the standards of bookwork set by Gutenberg, Nicholas Jensen, Aldus Manutius, Claude Garamond, Bodoni, and modern designers such as Jan Tschischold, Hans Mardersteig, Bruce Rogers, and Frederick Warde. The search for fine printing paper led Chaudhuri to the high narrow valley of Pescia in Tuscany where fifteenth-century methods are still being followed in the paper mill of Cartiere Enrico Magnani. The exquisite Japanese Kozo bark paper and the Gampi vellum are used for special reserve copies, which are bound by famous designer binders in full Morocco leather. Some of these examples can be seen at the National Art Library, Victoria; the Albert Museum in London; and in the British Library. Chaudhuri’s graphic work, large prints and photographic images, have been exhibited in Florence, London, and Paris.

His artistic work took a new direction with an audio play, Four Nights in Tunis. He wrote and directed the production of the compact disk in June 2007 and it is part of an audio book. The audio play was recorded at the professional sound studio A1 Vox and mastered at Iguana Music Studio, London. The parts were played by Beverley Beer and Andy Rowe. Chaudhuri was the narrator. From 2008 Chaudhuri became actively involved in the direction and production of films and created a completely new genre, a mixture of semiotic films, narration, and fictional documentary. The first film which he directed, produced, and wrote the screen play was released in 2009 under the title The Downfall and the Redemption of Dr John Faustino. This was followed by a two part series entitled In Santuario del Milagro with Jaguar of Chaco as the first part and Dolor de Rosita Valdez as the second. Then came a trilogy in 2011, Night Blooming Flower of the Poison Thicket. In 2013, Chaudhuri produced the trilogy Double Insanity Nostos Algos? Nostalgia?, Guilt from a Night of the Full Moon, and Dr Johannes von Faust. The cinematic and audio creations were produced two by the production studios Schifanoia Films and Centre Polyphony.

== Selected publications ==
1. The English East India Company; the Study of an Early Joint-Stock Company, 1600–1640. London: F. Cass, 1965. Reviewed in Bulletin of the School of Oriental and African Studies
2. The Economic Development of India under the East India Company 1814–58; a Selection of Contemporary Writings. Cambridge [Eng.]: University Press, 1971. Reviewed in The Journal of Asian Studies
3. The Trading World of Asia and the English East India Company, 1660–1760. Cambridge [Eng.]; New York: Cambridge University Press, 1978. Reviewed in The Economic Journal
4. With Dewey, Clive (eds), Economy and Society: Essays in Indian Economic and Social History. Delhi; New York: Oxford University Press, 1979. Reviewed in The Journal of Asian Studies
5. Trade and Civilisation in the Indian Ocean: An Economic History from the Rise of Islam to 1750. Cambridge [Cambridgeshire]; New York: Cambridge University Press, 1985.
