= Giovanni Antonio Tagliente =

Italian calligrapher

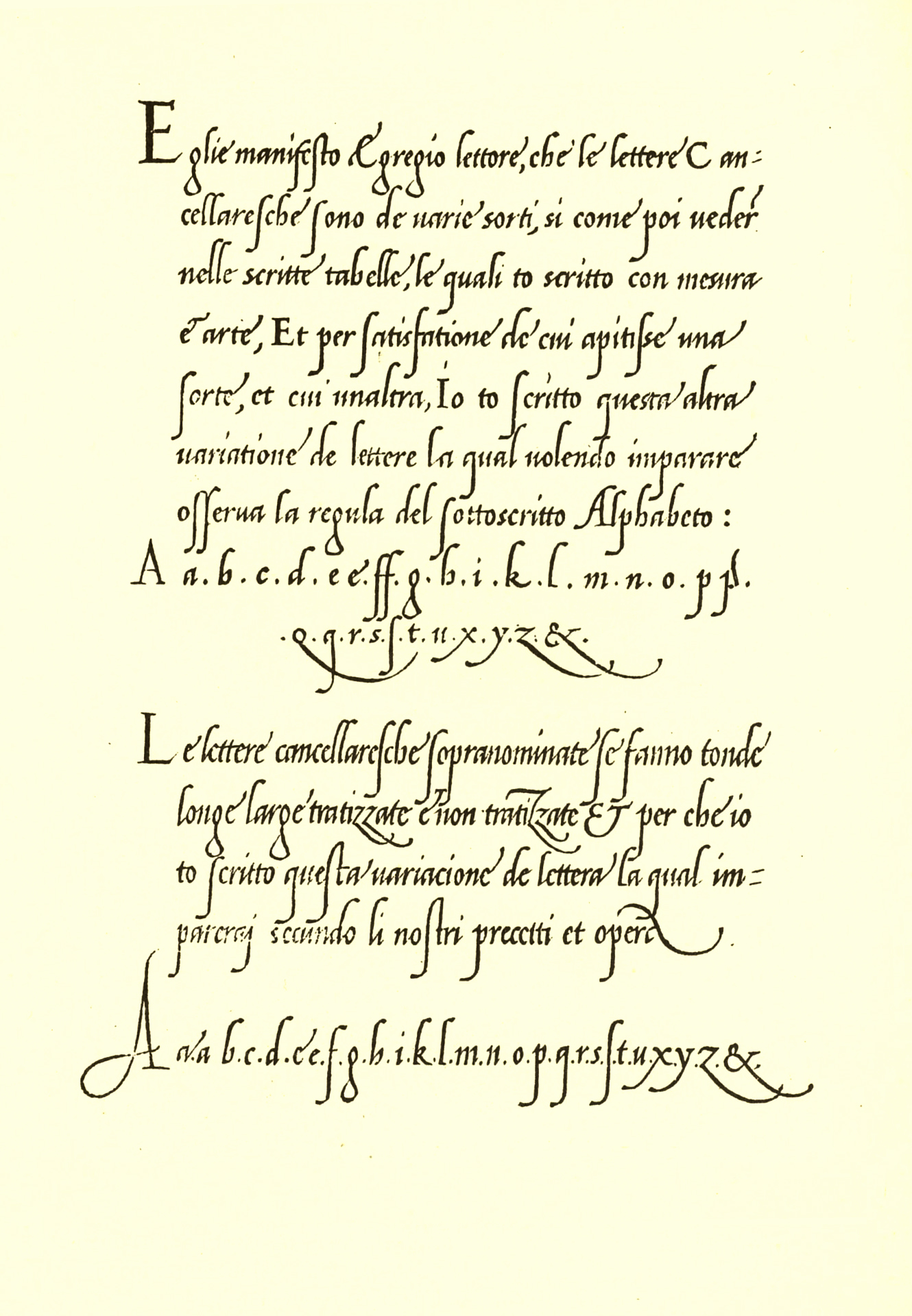
Giovanni Antonio Tagliente's 1524 writing manual. This section is engraved as a simulation of Tagliente's handwriting; other parts were set in a typeface of similar design.

Giovanni Antonio Tagliente (sometimes written Giovannantonio) (c. 1460s – c. 1528) was a calligrapher, author, printer and publisher based in Venice during the Renaissance period.

Tagliente began his life as a calligrapher and taught around Italy before returning to Venice in 1491. He worked for the Venetian Chancery and was given a sinecure by the senate, becoming a publisher late in life.

Tagliente's publications were textbooks and self-help volumes. These included guides on learning to read, arithmetic, accounting, embroidery patterns, textile production and a book of model love letters. Some of his books were very popular and were issued in dozens of editions. They have come to attention of feminist and social historians for their promotion of reading for women and the uneducated; his textbook on reading aimed to teach reading "in a period of two months, more or less depending on the intelligence of the reader." He also wrote for a target market of potential civil servants. Tagliente published a writing manual, The True Art of Excellent Writing or Lo presente libro, in Venice in 1524, with engravings and some text set in an italic typeface presumably based on his calligraphy.

Tagliente's typeface was an inspiration for historically inclined typeface designers in modern times, becoming the inspiration for the italic of the popular 1928 book typeface Bembo. Historian Alfred F. Johnson reprinted his work, along with his contemporary Ludovico Vicentino degli Arrighi.
