= Nokia Pure =

Typeface

- Category: Sans serif
- Classification: Neo-grotesque
- Foundry: Dalton Maag
- Date created: 2011
- Trademark: Nokia
- Sample

Nokia Pure is a typeface designed by London-based type foundry Dalton Maag for Nokia. It was designed primarily for use in digital media, in Nokia devices, and mobile environments. It has been the company's main typeface since its introduction. Its designers include Vincent Connare, creator of the classic font Comic Sans.

The typeface was developed to support Latin, Cyrillic, Greek, Arabic, Hebrew, Devanagari and Thai scripts when released in 2011 and extended to support Armenian, Ethiopic, Malayalam, Tamil, Kannada, Telugu, Gurmukhi, Gujarati, Bengali, Oriya, Sinhala, Khmer, Chinese and Klingon by 2013 The Nokia Pure typeface includes regular, light and bold fonts that also have been hinted to ensure a high quality image rendition for displays.

The font was launched in an exhibition called the "Nokia Pure Exhibition" with artists sponsored to come up with posters using the typeface. The posters were sold at the exhibition and online to raise money for the British Dyslexia Association.

Other merchandise featuring Nokia Pure has also been created, including postcards and mugs.

== Usage ==
The Nokia X logo, using the Nokia Pure font – 'Nokia' here is bold, whereas 'X' is light.

Comparison of Nokia Sans and Nokia Pure, both in regular form

The font was first introduced on 28 March 2011. It replaced the Nokia Sans font, which was designed by Erik Spiekermann and used since 2002. The first notable appearance of Nokia Pure was on the N9 smartphone. A Nokia Pure version of the Connecting People slogan was briefly used in 2011.

Pure was used to advertise the flagship Lumia series, but it was not present on the software because the devices ran Windows Phone which uses Microsoft's Segoe font. On Symbian smartphones, Pure was available in software updates in 2011, however Nokia Sans was still the default font even with the Anna and Belle updates the next year. Nokia Sans also continued to be used for Series 40 and Series 30 devices until 2015.

Nokia Pure is also used by Microsoft Mobile and its successor HMD Global in the software of their Nokia-branded feature phones, including Series 30+ and the former Nokia X and Asha software platforms.

== Designs of the Year 2012 ==
On 12 January 2012 it was announced that Nokia Pure had been nominated for a Design Museum Designs of the Year 2012 award in the Graphics category. It went on to win the Graphics category. The Nokia Pure typeface became part of the Designs of the Year 2012 exhibition which ran from 8 February to 4 July 2012.

== See also ==
- Nokia Sans
- Segoe
