= Calisto MT =

- Category: Serif
- Classification: Old style serif
- Designer: Ron Carpenter
- Foundry: Monotype Imaging
- Date released: 1987
- Sample

Calisto MT is an old-style serif typeface designed for the Monotype Corporation foundry in 1986 by Ron Carpenter, a British typographer.

Calisto MT is intended to function as both a typeface for body text and display text. Its stroke contrast is minimal and it preserves an even color, especially in smaller point sizes, which contributes to its great legibility. Its Roman and italic glyphs are animated by serifs and terminals that are cut on an angle to the baseline, and are concavely indented on the terminals, reminiscent of the Belwe and Palatino typefaces. Minuscule glyphs are of a somewhat large corpus size.
