= Dalton Maag =

Type foundry

- Industry: Font Design; Branding
- Founded: London, UK, 1991
- Founder: Bruno Maag
- Headquarters: London, UK
- Area served: Worldwide
- Key people: Bruno Maag (Chairman); Fabio Haag (Creative Director, Brazil); Lukas Paltram (Creative Director); David Marshall (managing director); Ron Carpenter; Vincent Connare
- Number of employees: 45 (2016)
- Website: daltonmaag.com

Dalton Maag is an independent font foundry with offices in London, UK, and São Paulo, Brazil. It designs fonts for use in corporate identities, logos, and other text uses. Dalton Maag has a library of 30 retail fonts as of 2016 and offers custom font creation and modification services to its clients.

== Typefaces ==
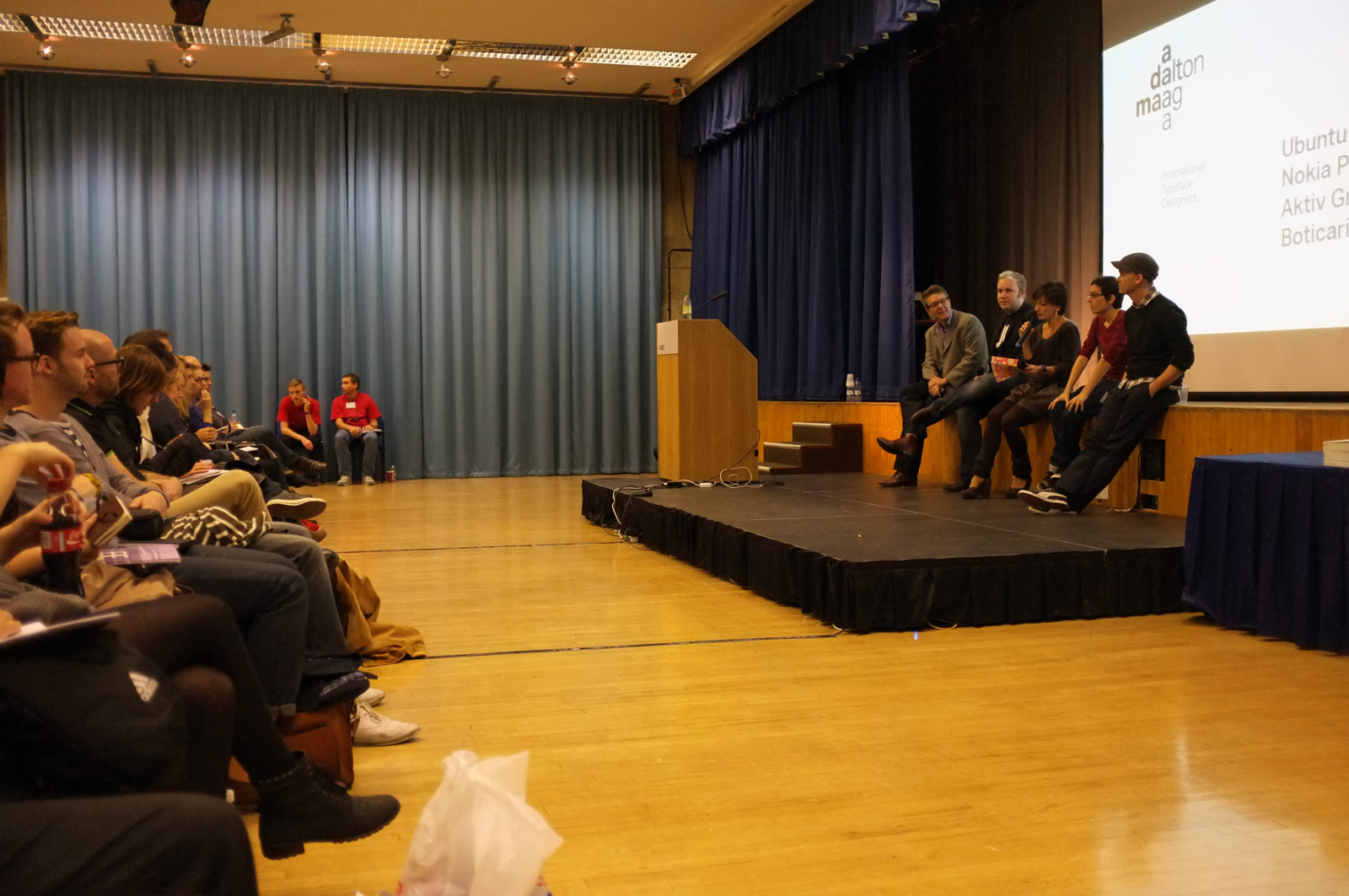
Dalton Maag staff speaking at the TYPO London conference in 2011

Many of Dalton Maag's typefaces have been designed for corporate clients. Dalton Maag's larger clients include AT&T, Airbnb, Netflix, BBC, Wix, Amazon, McDonald's, Ducati, DHL, Nokia, BMW, DeviantArt, Intel, Pitney Bowes, EMST, Korean Air, Repsol, Vodafone, Ubuntu, Maker’s Mark and Toyota. They also have a library of typefaces available to purchase from their website. Transport-related typefaces have included "Pantograph" for Manchester Metrolink and "Barlow", named after William Henry Barlow, for St Pancras railway station and the associated High Speed 1 signage. "Barlow" was created from a typeface called "Stroudley", which itself was descended from "Casey", designed for the KCR Corporation in Hong Kong.

The Ubuntu typeface was notable for being created for open source software company Canonical Ltd to use in their Ubuntu operating system, branding and publicity material. It was the first typeface to be designed with the intention that it should be expanded upon by the Open Source community. Because of the free and open-source nature of the Ubuntu operating system, the font is available to download for free.

Dalton Maag attracted some publicity when they created Nokia Pure for the Finnish mobile phone company Nokia, which replaced the earlier Nokia Sans font created by Erik Spiekermann. Spiekermann commented that he was disappointed that Dalton Maag had not consulted him on the new design and accused it of blandness. However, the new design was generally well received elsewhere, and in February 2012 Nokia Pure was nominated for the Design Museum Designs of the Year 2012 award in the graphics category. The font went on to win the Graphics category.

In July 2012 the Rio 2016 Olympic Games released their brand font created by Dalton Maag. It was based on the letters and numbers within the logo already created by Brazilian design agency, Tátil. The typeface took eight months to create and comprises 5448 characters. The design work was mainly done by Dalton Maag's Brazilian office, which worked with the London team during the font engineering stage, and also with Brazilian consultant Gustavo Soares, who worked as the technical interface between Dalton Maag and the Rio 2016 team.

Dalton Maag's library of typefaces include Lexia, Aktiv Grotesk, Elevon, Magpie, Effra, Objektiv, and Bressay. Elevon was originally created for the Virgin Galactic spaceflight programme.

Magpie was designed by Vincent Connare, who is known for designing Comic Sans. It was called Magpie because of the distinctive descenders in the italic form which are said to resemble the tails of magpies.

In 2015, Dalton Maag designed the Bookerly typeface and was released to be the default, exclusive font for reading on Amazon's Kindle devices.
