= Officina Bodoni =

Italian private press

The Officina Bodoni was a private press operated by Giovanni Mardersteig from 1922. It was named after the great eighteenth-century Italian typographer Giambattista Bodoni. The Officina Bodoni is known for printing books of the very highest quality and the finest craftsmanship.

== Giovanni Mardersteig ==
Giovanni Mardersteig' (born Hans Mardersteig, January 8, 1892, in Weimar, Germany; died December 27, 1977, in Verona, Italy) was a publisher, printer, typographer and historian. He was born into an artistic family. After early contact with art and literature, he studied law from 1910 to 1915 in Bonn, Kiel, Jena and Vienna. In 1922 Mardersteig moved to Montagnola di Lugano in Switzerland, founded a hand press, the Officina Bodoni, and began producing books.

Mardersteig moved his press to Verona, Italy, in 1927, partly in order to print a state-funded edition of the complete works of Gabriele D'Annunzio, which was completed in 1936. Mardersteig quickly developed a reputation for very fine typographical work, and for his scholarly approach to book design and production. He printed with a Dingler hand press on hand or mould-made papers or vellum, and often had his books bound in quarter vellum or leather with a decorated paper on the boards, in the tradition of European private presses.

Mardersteig was responsible for designing several typefaces for use at the press – Dante, Griffo and Zeno among them – all based on Humanist types of the early years of European printing; the punches for all three types were cut by Charles Malin. He was also involved with other twentieth-century type revivals, and was instrumental in designing Fontana for Collins Cleartype of Glasgow in the 1930s.

Mardersteig designed his own printer's mark after fifteenth-century models. A few of the approximately twenty versions of the design included the initials of the company and its location ("O B M" or "O B V"), but he seems to have preferred a simpler version without initials, especially for book covers according to Thomas Walker.

The Officina Bodoni printed and published some 200 books and pamphlets, including reprints of a number of early treatises on the book arts, notably on letter-forms and calligraphy, as well as literary and bibliographical works of all sorts, often commissioned by other publishers and institutions. Mardersteig printed books for the Limited Editions Club of New York, Duval and Hamilton and Faber and Faber among others. For the last, he printed new editions of T. S. Eliot's poems The Waste Land (1961) and Four Quartets (1960). From 1948, Mardersteig also ran a mechanized press which he named the Stamperia Valdonega. Here he was able to produce books in larger editions, and more quickly, but still applying the same standards of typographical excellence.

Giovanni Mardersteig was the first honoree of the Gutenberg Prize of the International Gutenberg Society and the City of Mainz.

== After Mardersteig's death ==
Following Mardersteig's death in 1977 his son, Martino Mardersteig, took over the running of the Stamperia Valdonega, and still occasionally used the Officina Bodoni imprint for works he printed on his father's hand-presses.

The books of the Officina Bodoni are widely collected, and generally admired by typographers and bibliophiles. There are good collections in many major European and American libraries. The Bodleian Library at Oxford holds a particularly rich collection, based partly on books and ephemera acquired from the typographical scholar John Ryder.
