= Stroudley (typeface) =

Sans-serif typeface

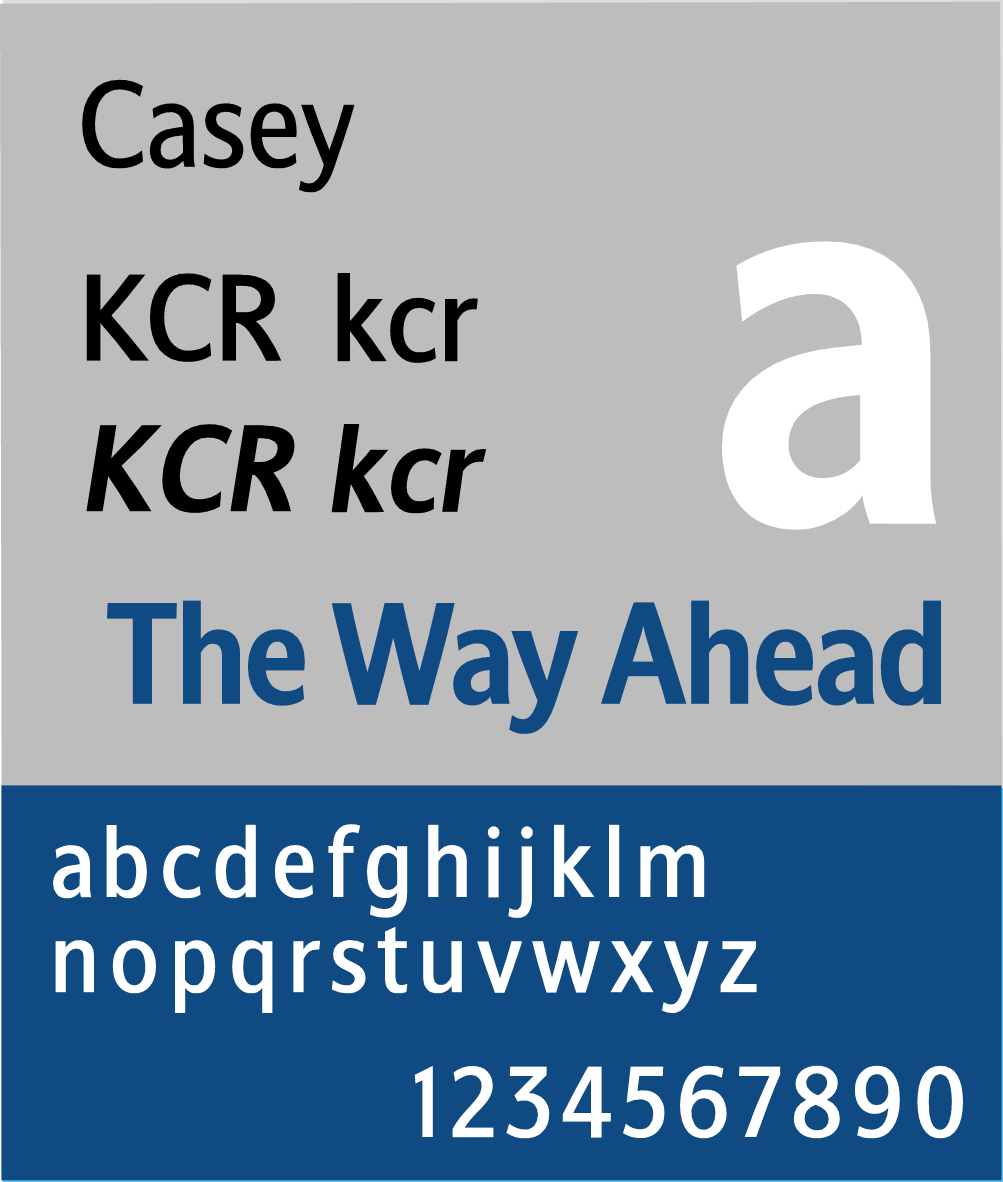
- Category: Sans-serif
- Classification: Humanist
- Commissioned by: Kowloon-Canton Railway Corporation
- Foundry: Dalton Maag
- Date created: 1996
- Also known as: Casey (KCRC version)
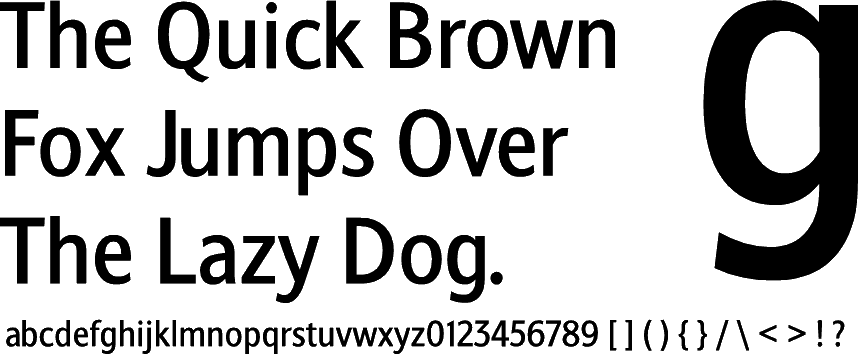
- Sample
- Shown here: Casey

Stroudley is a sans-serif typeface, created in 1996 by Dalton Maag as commissioned by Kowloon-Canton Railway Corporation (KCRC), a transit operator in Hong Kong, for use on the corporate identity of its railway system; the version used by the rail company was named Casey.

== History ==
Casey was introduced in 1996 by the KCRC. It is a condensed humanist sans-serif akin to wider Frutiger or Myriad (letters), and the name Casey comes from KC, the first 2 letters of KCRC.

Dalton Maag later amended Casey and released it as a commercial font named "Stroudley". Stroudley then served as a template for the Barlow typeface made for the signage at London St Pancras International station.

== Usage ==
Casey was commissioned by KCRC for the use of its corporate identity on its railway system. Its first usage was on the KCRC logo, which was revised in 1996. When the Metro Cammell EMU of the KCR East Rail (now East Rail line) was modernised, their fleet number was clearly posted in Casey. The same practice was done when the new SP1900 trains came into service.

When the KCR West Rail (now Tuen Ma Line with merger of Ma On Shan Rail) started operation, its usage expanded to all signage and station nameboards in the WR stations, and even became the font used in the leaflets and brochures distributed by the Corporation.

While most of the ex-KCR signage has been replaced to match MTR style (using the typeface Myriad) following the railway merger, Casey is still visible on certain signage today.

In 2019, the font began its usage in the public transport system of Singapore, first introduced during the opening of Canberra MRT station and Thomson–East Coast MRT line, replacing the previous font, Ocean Sans. The font also began its usage in Changi Airport, since post-COVID, these include security screening signboards, immigration/duty-free signboards and boarding gate signboards.

== See also ==
- Humanist sans-serif

== Link ==
- Dalton Maag
