= Dante (typeface) =

Typeface

- Category: Serif
- Classification: Old-style
- Designer(s): Giovanni Mardersteig, Ron Carpenter
- Foundry: Officina Bodoni (original), Monotype Imaging (digitization)

Dante is a mid-20th-century old-style serif typeface designed by Giovanni Mardersteig, originally for use by the Officina Bodoni for books. The original type was cut by Charles Malin. The type is a serif face influenced by (but not directly indebted to) the types cut by Francesco Griffo between 1449 and 1516. Mardersteig had become acquainted with Griffo's type in the design of his previous typeface, called Griffo. One of the primary objectives in designing Dante was in keeping a visual balance between the roman and italics (in Griffo's time typefaces were cut in roman style and italic style, but not both).

The name of the typeface comes from the first book in which it was first used, Boccaccio's Trattatello in Laude di Dante, published in 1955 by the Officina Bodoni. The book used types cut by Malin between 1946 and 1952. The date of the typeface is sometimes given as 1954. Dante would become one of the most used types by Mardersteig.

Originally Dante was cut for use on the private handpress, but Monotype had already expressed interest in issuing Dante for machine composition before 1955. This was about the same time that Malin died, and Monotype was also interested in adding a semibold weight to the Dante family. Matthew Carter, in his twenties at the time, was recruited to cut some of the initial punches of the semibold. Monotype issued its Dante in 1957.

Dante was redrawn for digital use by Monotype's Ron Carpenter in 1993.
