= Bruno Maag =

Swiss typographer

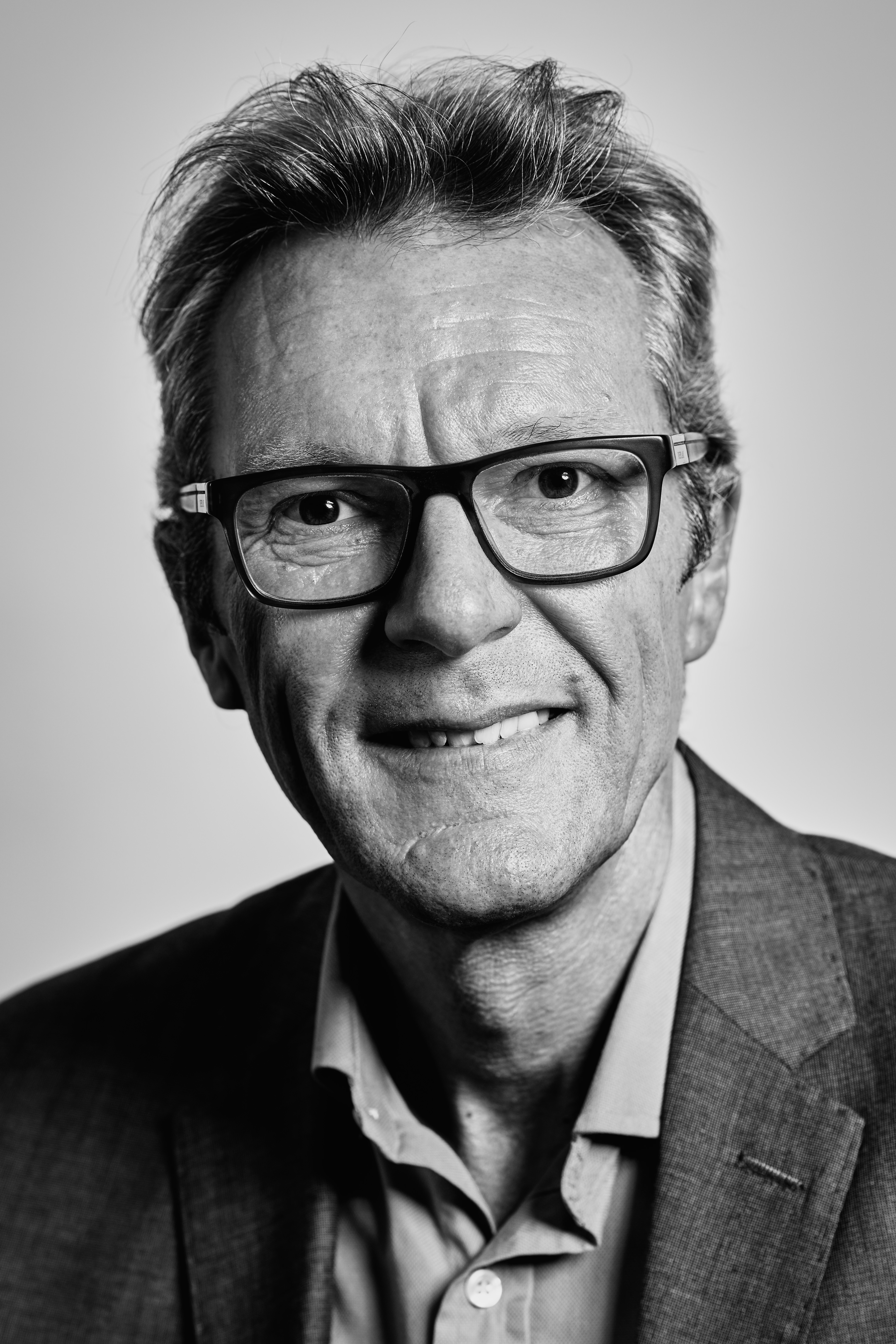
Bruno Maag, 2018

Bruno Maag (born 1962) is a Swiss type designer and founder of type design company Dalton Maag.

Maag began his career with an apprenticeship as a typesetter for the Tages Anzeiger, Switzerland's largest daily paper. This led him to study Visual Communication at Basel School of Design. During a work experience placement at Stempel, he met Rene Kerfante, who later moved to Monotype and then invited him to join him there. He worked for Monotype both in the UK and in the USA, where he designed fonts for The New Yorker.

He established Dalton Maag in London in 1991.

He is renowned in the typographic community for his strong dislike of the typeface Helvetica.

== Typefaces ==
Maag has designed several typefaces as part of his design work at Dalton Maag: Aktiv Grotesk, Co, Dedica, Elevon, InterFace, Plume, Royalty, Stroudley and Viato.
