= Giovanni Mardersteig =

- Born: 8 January 1892; Weimar
- Died: 27 December 1977 (aged 85); Verona
- Occupation: Graphic designer
- Awards: Grand Officer of the Order of Merit of the Italian Republic (1954); Gold Medal of the Italian Order of Merit for Culture and Art (1962)

Giovanni Mardersteig (born Hans Mardersteig 8 January 1892 – 27 December 1977) was a German-born printer and typographer, making much of his career in Italy. He is particularly known for founding and running Officina Bodoni, a small press producing high-quality editions, and his typeface Dante.

== Early life ==
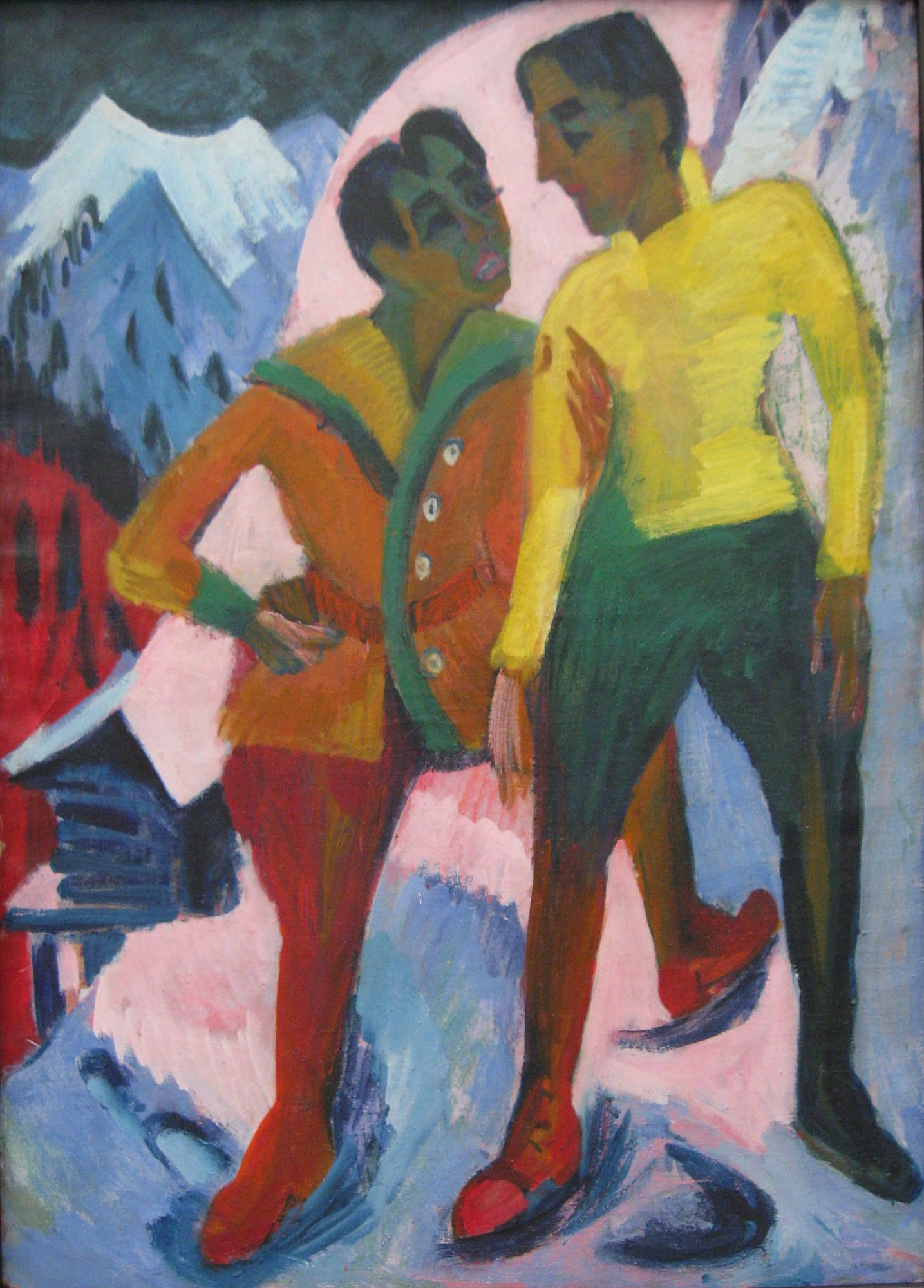
Ernst Ludwig Kirchner: Zwei Brüder M., 1921, depicting Hans (Giovanni) and his brother Arnold Mardersteig

Mardersteig was born Hans Mardersteig on 8 January 1892 in Weimar, Germany, to August Mardersteig and Klara Blaeser.

His father was a lawyer and insisted that Hans would study law as well. So, after his Abitur Hans studied law in the universities of Bonn, Vienna (Austria), Kiel, and Jena, where he earned his doctorate from in 1915. Although he completed his traineeship, he never practiced law. Instead, he went to Zuoz, Switzerland, where he briefly acted as a teacher.

In addition to being skilled with law, his family was very literate and artistically oriented. His grandfather had been a painter, and Hans had already specialized in the history of art during his university years in Vienna. In 1917 in Switzerland, he helped organize a section of German expressionists in a Zürich art exhibition covering German visual artists from the 19th and 20th centuries. It was through an association with Harry Graf Kessler, a patron of publishing, that Mardersteig was drawn toward that trade specifically. He returned to Germany later in 1917, joining the publishing house of Kurt Wolff, first in Leipzig and later in Munich, where he supervised production and edited art books. He also founded and edited the publisher's short-lived art magazine of only six issues, Genius: Zeitschrift für alte und werdende Kunst, together with Carl Georg Heise and Kurt Pinthus from 1919 to 1921. The magazine became a platform for notables like Franz Kafka and Oskar Kokoschka.

== Career ==
=== Founding of Officina Bodoni ===
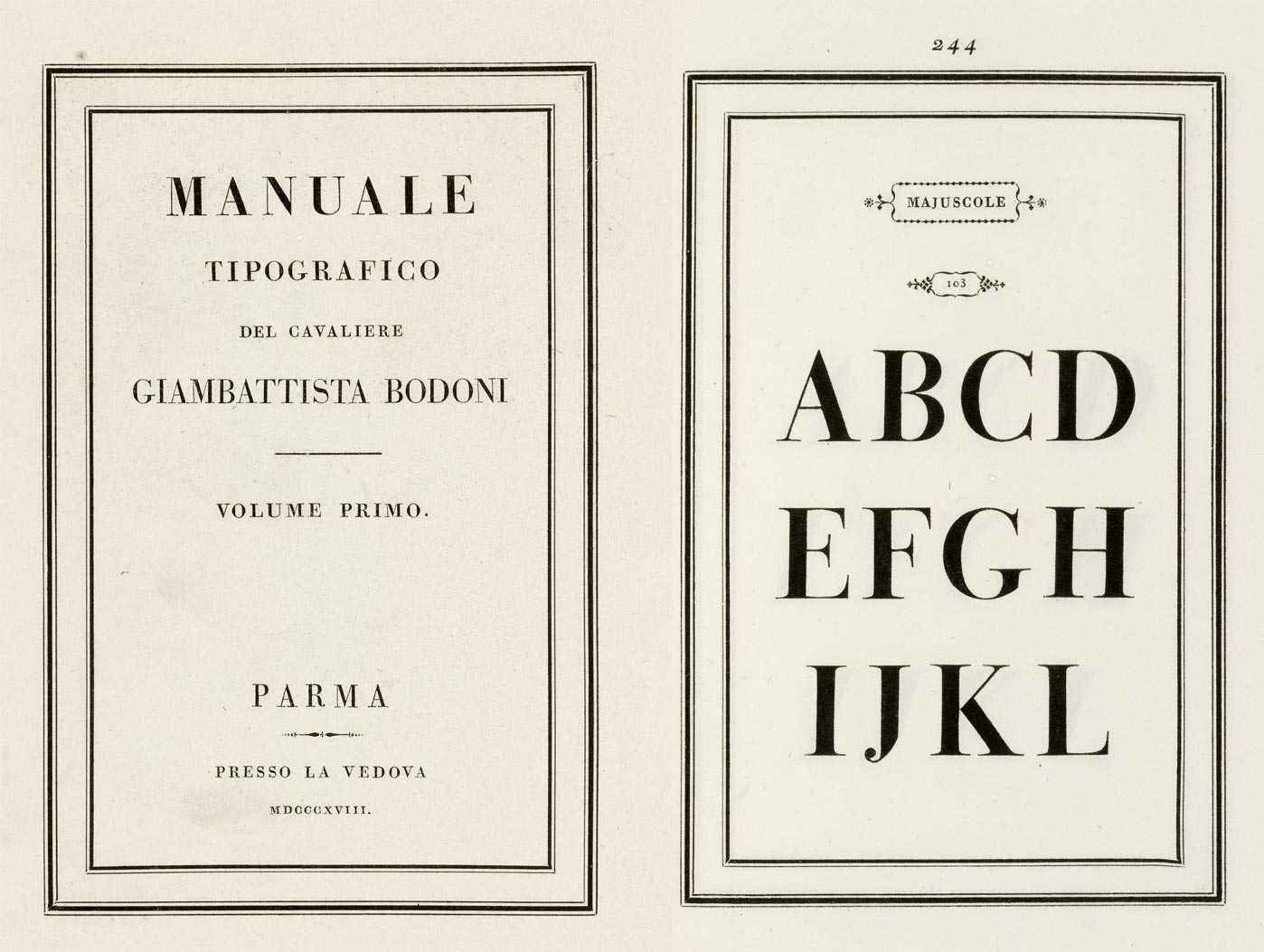
Bodoni font

Mardersteig developed in particular an interest in the famed engraver Giambattista Bodoni. After Mardersteig received permission from the Bodoni Museum of Parma to use his typefaces, known as Bodoni fonts, he relocated back to Switzerland, to Montagnola, in 1922, motivated by poor health. There with the help of a friend he founded Officina Bodoni, a private press named after Bodoni. A test run of Johann Wolfgang von Goethe's Urworte Orphisch using Bodoni's typeface was finished by December. Initially working alone using a handpress, Mardersteig later hired assistants but continued to head the press. Officina Bodoni's first published book, Poliziano's L'Orfeo, was published in April the next year and was soon followed by Percy Bysshe Shelley's Epipsychidion, William Shakespeare's The Tempest, and Dante Alighieri's La Vita Nuova.

After Mardersteig had won a competition to become the printer of a new national edition of the complete works of the Italian poet and war hero Gabriele D'Annunzio, he transferred the ownership of Officina Bodoni to Arnoldo Mondadori in 1926. The press, and Mardersteig, moved to Verona, Italy, where Mondadori had printing facilities. Mardersteig would work intensely for the next five years on the edition consisting of 48 volumes and an index in Verona near Annunzio's home. Annunzio, his contemporary who had personally the competition winner and was known for flamboyancy, would often summon Mardersteig to his home by Lake Garda to inspect his work in person and page by page. D'Annunzio's complete works finally appeared in 1936.

=== Typefaces ===
In 1936, after he had finished with D'Annunzio's work, Mardersteig sojourned in Scotland for a year with the Glasgow-based Collins Cleartype Press, designing the Fontana typeface that would go on to be used in Collins dictionaries. Other typefaces designed by him include Dante, Griffo, Zeno, and Pacioli, all for Officina Bodoni, sometimes with the help of French punchcutter Charles Malin. Of all his typefacces his last, Dante, is the most famous and considered one of the finest. It derived its name from Giovanni Boccaccio's Trattatello in laude di Dante, a 1955 edition of which by Mardersteig was the first to use the typeface.

=== Later career ===
During World War II Mardersteig helped political dissidents, hiding them and aiding them in their escape. When northern Italy was controlled by the Nazis in 1945, Mardersteig's press printed 200 copies of sonnets against them written by the German author Rudolf Hagelstange who was stationed with the Wehrmacht in the Veneto region. Mardersteig continued his work at Officina Bodoni in Verona, where printing operations were back to normal after the war. Hans Mardersteig became an Italian citizen in 1946 and officially changed his first name to Giovanni, a name he had used since 1927 when he moved to Italy. Books edited by Mardersteig from the Italian period of Officina Bodoni include Felice Feliciano's Alphabetum Romanum (1960) and The Alphabet of Francesco Torniello (1971) based on the work of Francesco Torniello.

In 1946 Mardersteig founded another printing press, the Stamperia Valdonega, also in Verona. This printer was more commercially oriented and worked with major publishers like Adelphi Edizioni, Collins, Folio, Sansoni, and Salani.

Late in life, Mardersteig partnered with his son Martino Mardersteig. The last books made under Giovanni Mardersteig's supervision were the Scottish poet Hugh MacDiarmid's Selected Lyrics and sayings of ancient Greek philosophers under the title The Seven Sages of Greece in Italian and English translation. For the last six months of his life, Mardersteig was hospitalized with an incurable illness. After Mardersteig died on 27 December 1977 in Verona, his widow, son Martino and Martino's wife took over both Officina Bodoni and the Stamperia.

== Personal life ==
His brother Arnold Mardersteig (1898–1988) was a journalist. Giovanni Mardersteig was of Protestant (evangelisch) faith. Mardersteig married Irmi Krayer in 1932. Mardersteig was fluent in many languages, including Greek and Latin.

== Legacy ==
Mardersteig's Officina Bodoni work on "small editions, printed with meticulous care on an old-fashioned handpress that occupied a room in his house" earned him considerable international reputation. The press stayed operational until the year of his death, and "No other hand press achieved its international success and developed such a huge impact within the graphic arts industry." Called the "prince of printers", he was considered a "perfectionist and printed exquisite books of the highest typographical standards", which according to Rudolf Hagelstange came as close to ideal as possible. He is considered "one of the most important historians for typography, book and font." According to Alexander Lawson, writing in 1990: "Future typographic historians will probably be surprised that his efforts to maintain the scholarly heritage came at a time when technological change was creating an atmosphere uniformly antithetic to the continuance of this old printing tradition: it is because of the success of his efforts that this great tradition was preserved." Giovanni Mardersteig chose to keep a low profile, but the following can be considered a public statement of his design philosophy: "First, service to the author, searching for the form best suited to his theme. Second, service to the reader, making reading as pleasant and light for him as possible. Third, the giving of the whole and attractive appearance without imposing too much of self-will." He is today considered a master printmaker.

Mardersteig was made Grand Officer of the Order of Merit of the Italian Republic in 1954 and received the Italian Medal of Merit for Culture and Art in Gold in 1962. He was an Honorary Foreign Corresponding member of the Grolier Club since 1964, the inaugural recipient of the Gutenberg Prize of the International Gutenberg Society and the City of Mainz (1968), a recipient of the Bodoni Prize of the City of Parma, AIGA Medal (1968), and the Frederic W. Goudy Award (1972).

== See also ==
- Fine press
- History of Western typography
- Small press
- Type design
