= Codex Vaticanus (disambiguation) =

The Codex Vaticanus (in Latin, "Vatican's codex") is one of the oldest and most valuable extant manuscripts of the Greek Bible (Gregory number: B/03). In addition to that most common reference, however, the term may refer to any other of the (thousands of) manuscripts preserved in the Vatican Library, a partial list of which follows:

== Manuscripts of Aristotle ==
- Codex Vaticanus 253, manuscript of the On the Soul of Aristotle, 13th century
- Codex Vaticanus 260, manuscript of the On the Soul of Aristotle, 11th century
- Codex Vaticanus 266, manuscript of the On the Soul of Aristotle, 14th century
- Codex Vaticanus 1026, manuscript of the On the Soul of Aristotle, 13th century
- Codex Vaticanus 1339, manuscript of the On the Soul of Aristotle, 14th-15th century

== Manuscripts of Catullus ==
- Codex Vaticanus Ottobonianus Latinus 1829, late 14th century

== Manuscripts of the Bible ==
- Codex Vaticanus 354, a Greek manuscript of the Gospels
- Codex Vaticanus 2061, a Greek manuscript of the Acts, Catholic epistles, and Pauline epistles written on vellum
- Codex Vaticanus 2066, a Greek manuscript of the Book of Revelation written on vellum
- Codex Vaticanus gr. 2061, uncial manuscript of the four Gospels
- Codex Vaticanus gr. 665, minuscule manuscript of the New Testament
- Codex Vaticanus Palatinus 220, minuscule manuscript of the New Testament
- Codex Vaticanus gr. 2125, uncial manuscript of Septuaginta
- Codex Vaticanus Gr. 2302, uncial manuscript of the Acts

== Manuscripts of Virgil ==
- Codex Vaticanus Latinus 3256, 4th century
- Codex Vaticanus Latinus 3225, early 5th century
- Codex Vaticanus Latinus 3867, 5th century

== Renaissance manuscripts ==
- Codex Vaticanus Latinus 5314, dated 7 December 1451, contains a copy of Lorenzo Valla's treatise on the Donation of Constantine

== Other ==
- Codex Vaticanus Graecus 64, dated to 1270, contains Socrates Letters
- Codex Vaticanus 3868

== Mesoamerican manuscripts ==
- Codex Ríos, known as Codex Vaticanus A, or Codex Vaticanus 3738
- Codex Vaticanus B, Codex Vaticanus 3773, Aztec ritual document
