= Vaticanus =

Vaticanus may refer to:

- Vatican Hill (in Latin, Vaticanus Mons), a location of Holy See
- Vagitanus or Vaticanus, an Etruscan god

== See also ==
- Codex Vaticanus (disambiguation)
