= Codex Bembinus =

Codex Bembinus is the oldest surviving manuscript containing the comedies of the Roman playwright Terence. It dates back to the 4th or 5th century, and is stored in the Vatican Archives. It is written in Rustic capitals. The manuscript was once owned by Bernardo Bembo, and subsequently Fulvio Orsini, before entering the archives in 1600.

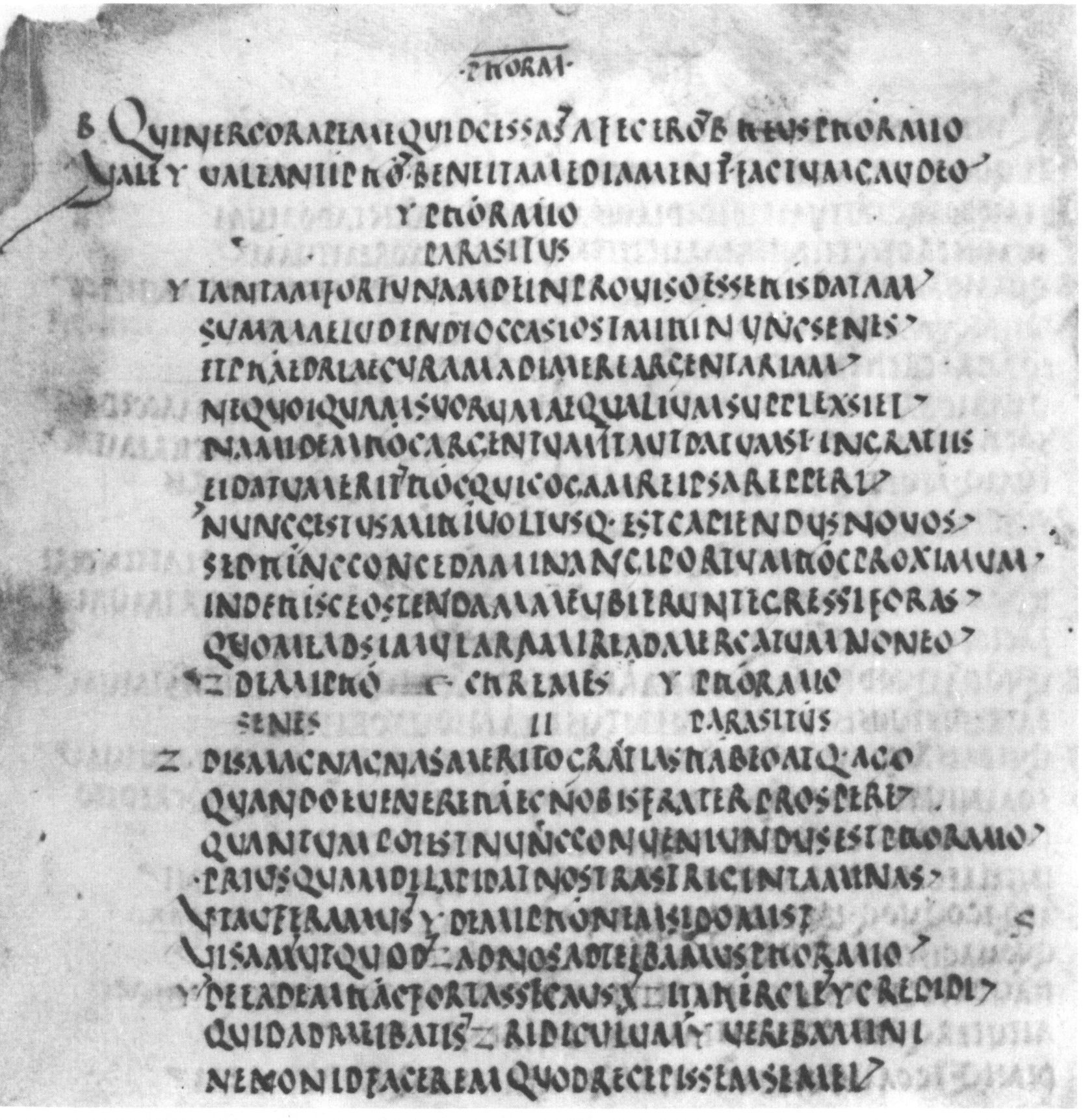
Manuscript page
