= Alphabetum Romanum =

1463 Latin book by Felice Feliciano

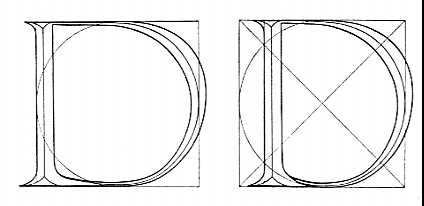
Design for the letter 'D', from Felice Feliciano, Alphabetum Romanum Codex Vaticanus 6852

The Alphabetum Romanum, by Felice Feliciano, published in 1463, is a text that covers how to create Roman square capital letters geometrically based on the subdivision of a square.

The codex, probably printed in Verona, is the first humanistic treatise on the construction of Roman capital letters. It contains a complete Roman alphabet, two letters on each sheet, below which the rules for their design are given. The final part includes a recipe for colors. The original is hand-colored with text both in Italian and Latin with an epigram by Paolo Ramusio published in 1463 in Volume Codex Vaticanus Latinus 6852. The original is preserved in the Vatican Apostolic Library.
