= Charles César Baudelot de Dairval =

French antiquarian and collector (1648 - 1722)

- Born: November 29, 1648; Beauvais, France
- Died: June 27, 1722 (aged 73); Paris, France
- Occupations: Antiquarian, collector, lawyer
- Known for: Member of the Académie des Inscriptions et Belles-Lettres
- Notable work: De l'utilité des voyages et de l'avantage que la recherche des antiquités procure aux sçavans Histoire de Ptolémée Aulètes

Charles César Baudelot de Dairval (29 November 1648 – 27 June 1722) was a French antiquarian and collector.

== Biography ==
Charles César Baudelot de Dairval began his education with his uncle, the theologian Louis Hallé, in Beauvais. He then continued his studies at the Sorbonne under Abbé Pierre Danet and devoted himself entirely to law. After graduating, he was employed as a lawyer at the Parlement of Paris.

He first became interested in antiquity when he was in Dijon on business. During this time, he began to collect antiquities and books himself. After returning to Paris, he began to devote himself exclusively to his studies of antiquities. At the end of the 1690s, he became supervisor of the medal and coin cabinet of Elisabeth-Charlotte of Orléans in Paris.

Baudelot de Dairval was a member of the Académie des Inscriptions et Belles-Lettres.

== Works ==
- De l'utilité des voyages et de l'avantage que la recherche des antiquités procure aux sçavans
- Histoire de Ptolémée Aulètes, dissertation sur une pierre gravée antique du cabinet de Madame (1698)
- Voyage du sieur Paul Lucas au Levant
- Portraits d'hommes et de femmes illustres du recueil de Fulvius Ursinus (1720).
