= Felice Feliciano =

Felice Feliciano (Verona 1433 - Rome 1479) was a fifteenth-century calligrapher, composer of alchemical sonnets, collector of drawings and expert on Roman antiquity, especially inscriptions on stone.

== Biography ==
He lived just long enough to see printing arrive in Italy. He was the first to recreate geometrically the alphabet of Roman inscriptions, in 1463. The original copy of Alphabetum Romanum, his treatise on the geometrical construction of Roman capital letters using the square and circle, is preserved in the Vatican Library (Codex Vat. lat. 6852). In 1470 while in Bologna as Vicario di Castel San Giorgio, he became acquainted with Sabadino degli Arienti, who mentioned him in his III and IV Porretane. He started printing in 1476 in Poiano, near Verona. In 1478, he travelled to Rome, visiting his friend Francesco Porcari.

== Felix Titling font ==
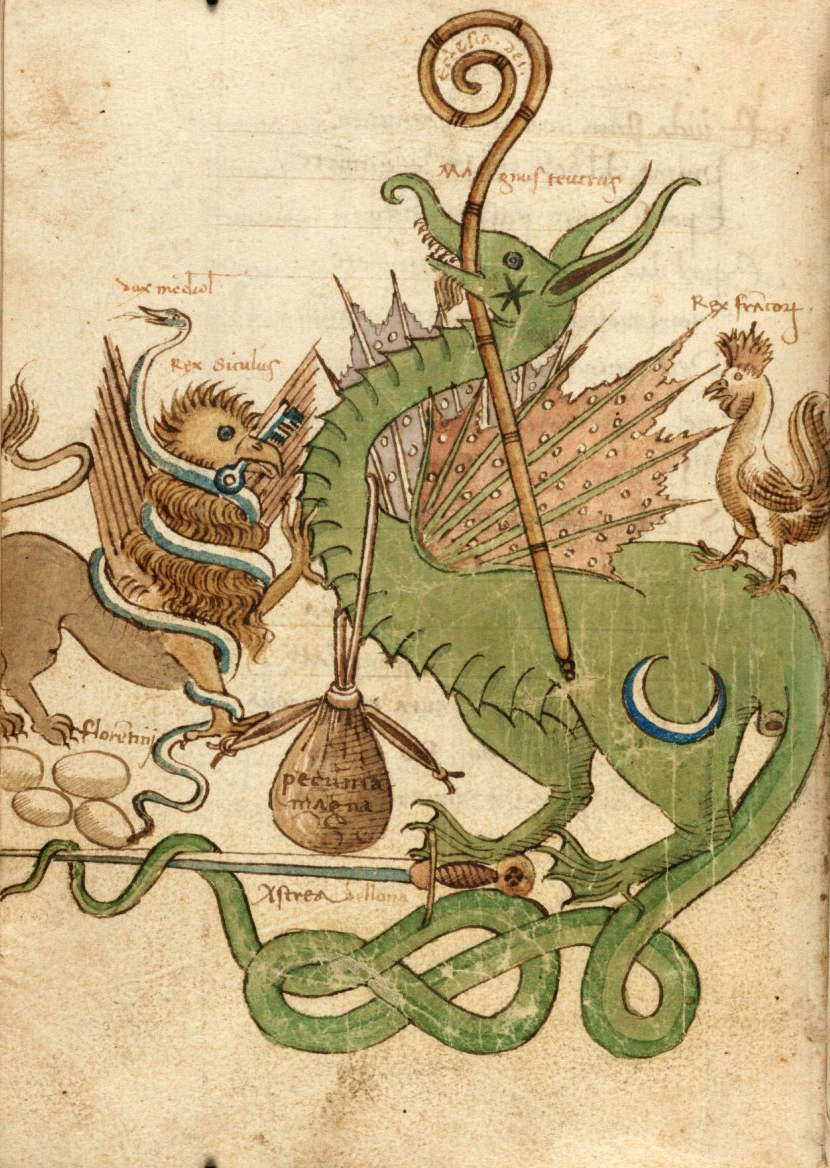
From manuscript of Poems and Epistles

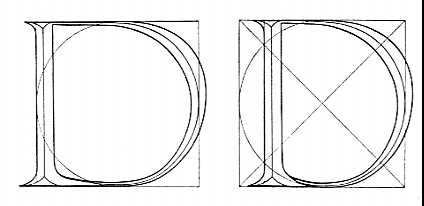
Design for the letter 'D', from Felice Feliciano, Alphabetum Romanum Codex Vaticanus 6852.

Monotype's Felix Titling (1934) is based on a 1463 alphabet of Feliciano.

== Works ==
- Alphabetum Romanum (1463)
- Poems and epistles : with novellas by other authors (1471–1472)
