= Vergilius Romanus =

5th century illustrated manuscript

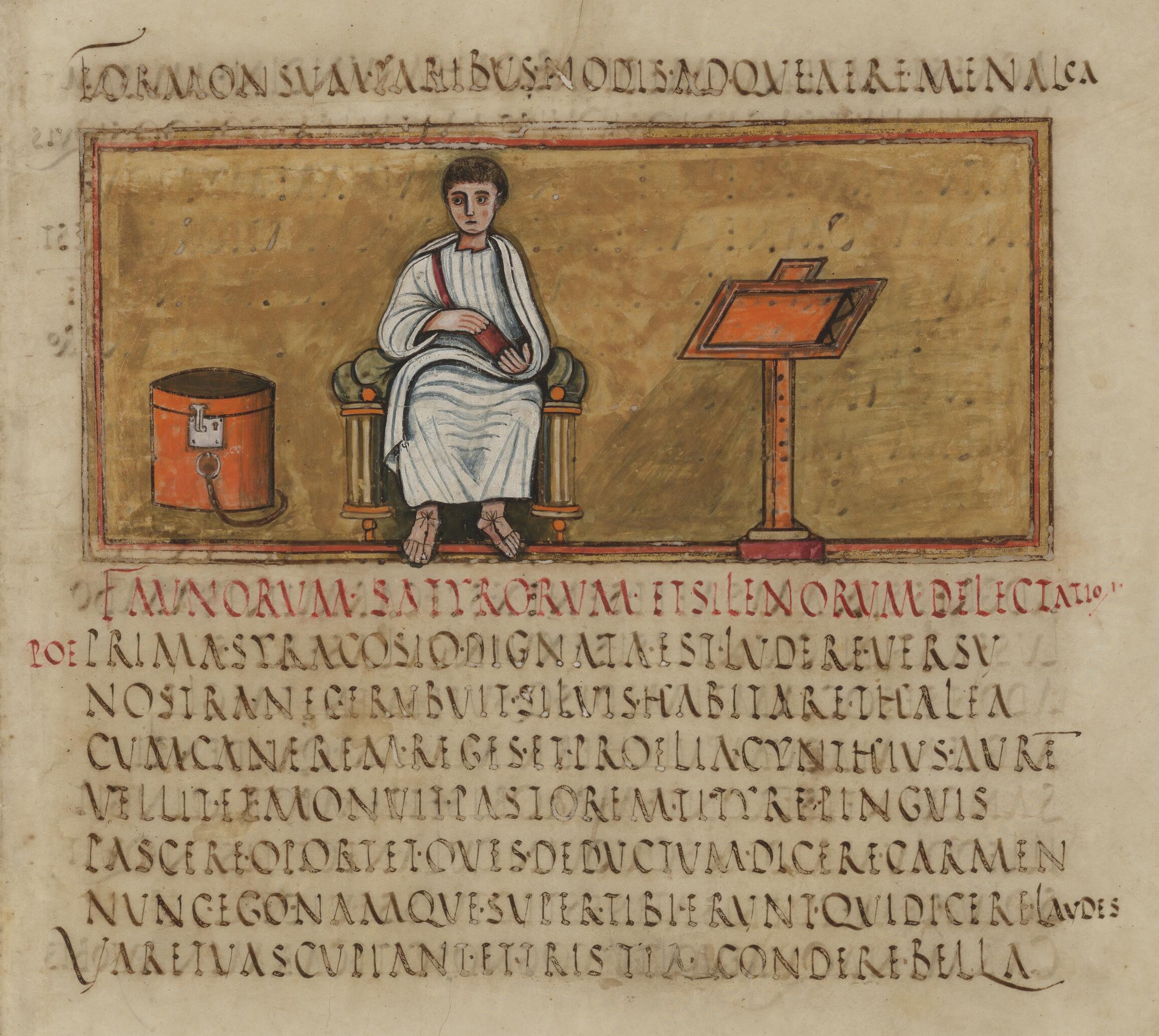
Folio 14 recto of the Vergilius Romanus contains an author portrait of Virgil.

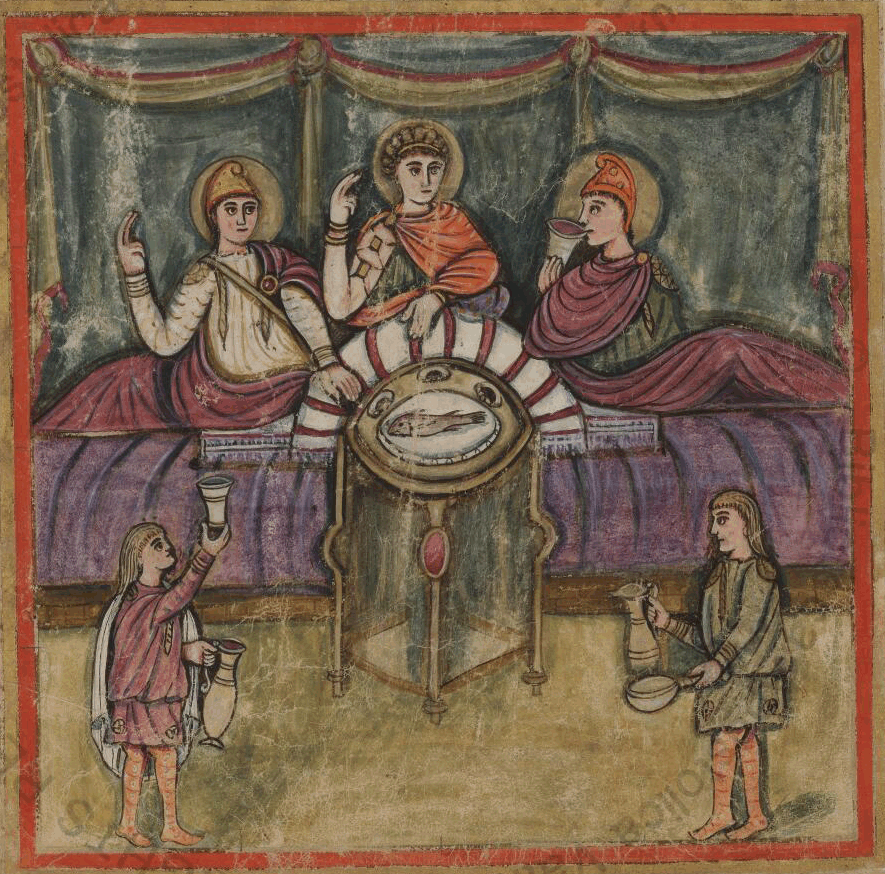
Folio 100 verso. Dido and Aeneas at the banquet.

The Vergilius Romanus (Vatican City, Biblioteca Apostolica, Cod. Vat. lat. 3867), also known as the Roman Vergil, is a 5th-century illustrated manuscript of the works of Virgil. It contains the Aeneid, the Georgics, and some of the Eclogues. It is one of the oldest and most important Vergilian manuscripts. It is 332 by 323 mm with 309 vellum folios. It was written in rustic capitals with 18 lines per page.

== Decoration ==
The Vergilius Romanus is one of the few surviving illustrated classical manuscripts. As such, its importance to art history is hard to overstate. The manuscript has 19 surviving illustrations, painted by at least two artists, both of whom are anonymous. The style of both artists represents the beginning of a break with classical style. The human form becomes abstracted and flattened and the naturalistic depiction of space is abandoned.

The first artist painted a single miniature on folio 1 recto, an illustration for the First Eclogue. In it a cowherd, Tityrus, plays a flute while sitting under a tree. The heads of three cows look out from behind the tree. Meanwhile a standing goatherd, Meliboeus, leads a goat by its horns under a tree. More goats look out from behind that tree. This miniature shows some remnants of classical style. The cows and goats looking out from behind the trees are an attempt, albeit an unsuccessful one, at creating the appearance of space. The garments of the two men are draped naturally and the heads are shown in three quarter view. The miniature, unlike any miniature in this manuscript, is unframed which shows a connection to the tradition of papyrus roll illustration.

The second artist demonstrates a more radical break from the classical tradition in the remaining miniatures. All of these miniatures are framed in red and gold. The artist seems to have no real understanding of the portrayal of the human body, and is incapable of handling a contorted pose, such as is seen on folio 100 verso, where a reclining figure is portrayed in an utterly unconvincing manner. Faces are no longer portrayed in three quarter position but are either frontal or full profile. The clothing no longer drapes naturally but is instead reduced to rhythmic curving lines. The page is often divided into separate compartments (See, for example, Folio 108r). When a landscape is depicted there is no attempt to depict a three-dimensional space. There is no ground line and items are spread evenly over the field. Care is taken so that items do not overlap each other. The effect is remarkably similar to some Roman floor mosaics, which may have served as inspiration (see folios 44 verso and 45 recto.

The manuscript contains three author portraits (Folios 3v, 9r, and 14 r). These portraits show a reliance on the early papyrus scroll tradition of manuscript portraits. They are inserted into the text column within a frame. The portraits show Vergil sitting on a chair between a lectern and a locked chest. The portrait on folio 3v has the lectern on Vergil's right on the chest on his left, which is reversed in the other two portraits.

== Provenance ==
The Vergilius Romanus was produced in an undetermined province. Based on the style of some aspects of the illumination, Martin Henig has suggested that it was produced in Britain. If this is true it would make it the oldest surviving British codex. It was at the Abbey of St Denis until the 15th century but it is not known how it came to be at St Denis or in the Vatican.

The Vergilius Romanus is not to be confused with the Vergilius Vaticanus (Vatican City, Biblioteca Apostolica, Cod. Vat. lat. 3225) or the Vergilius Augusteus, other ancient Vergilian manuscripts in the Biblioteca Apostolica.

== Gallery ==
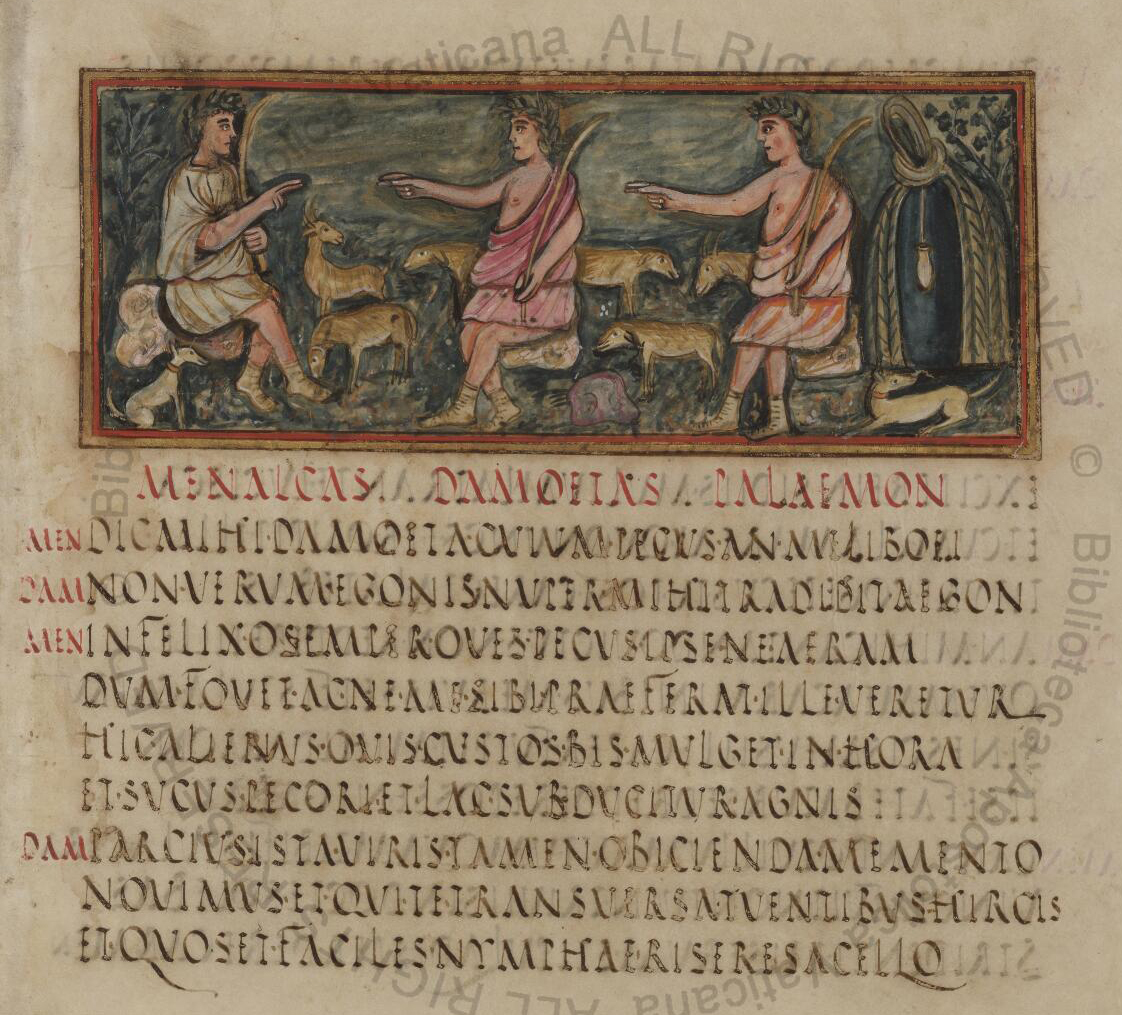
Folio 6 recto

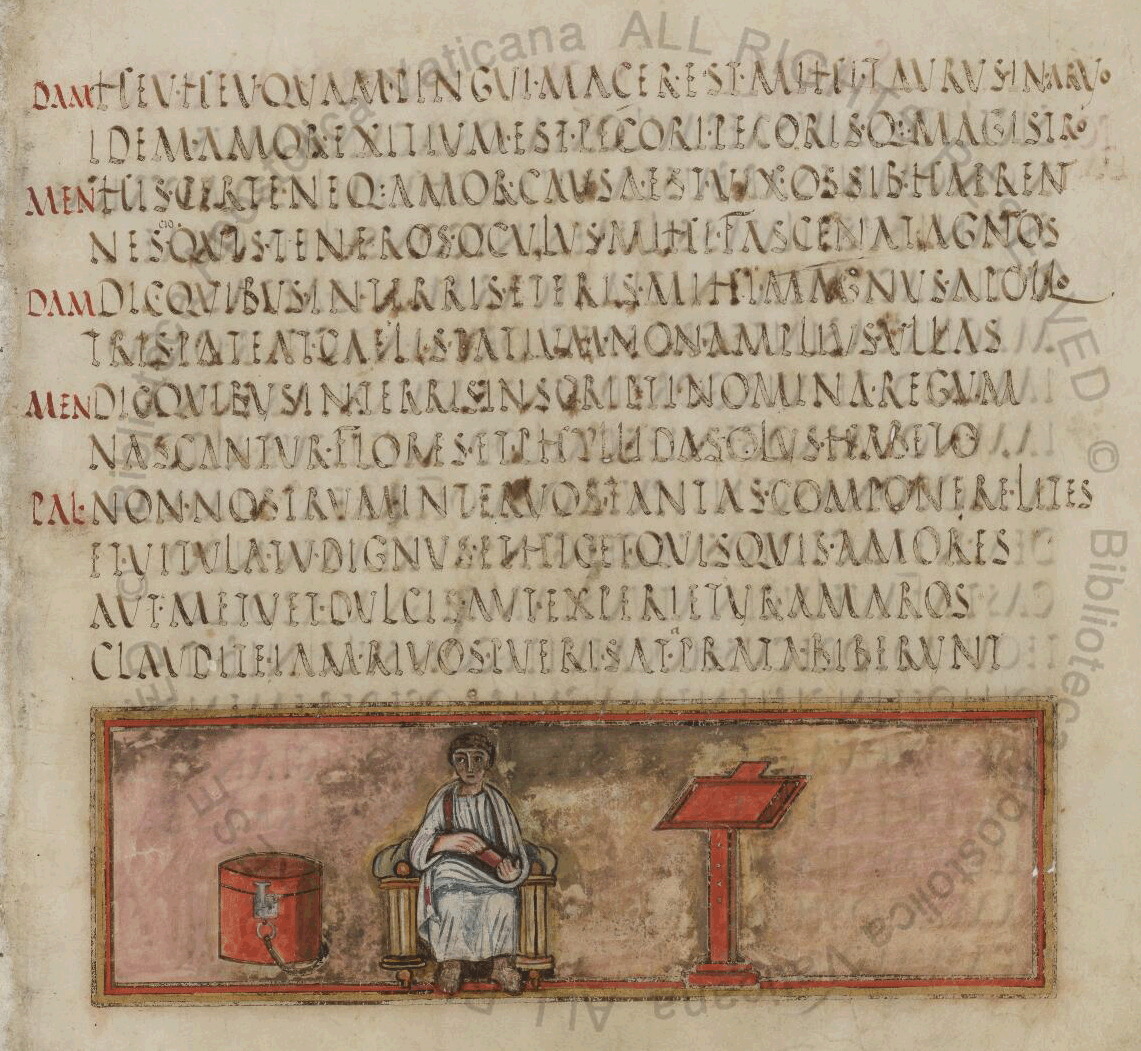
Folio 9 recto. Second author portrait

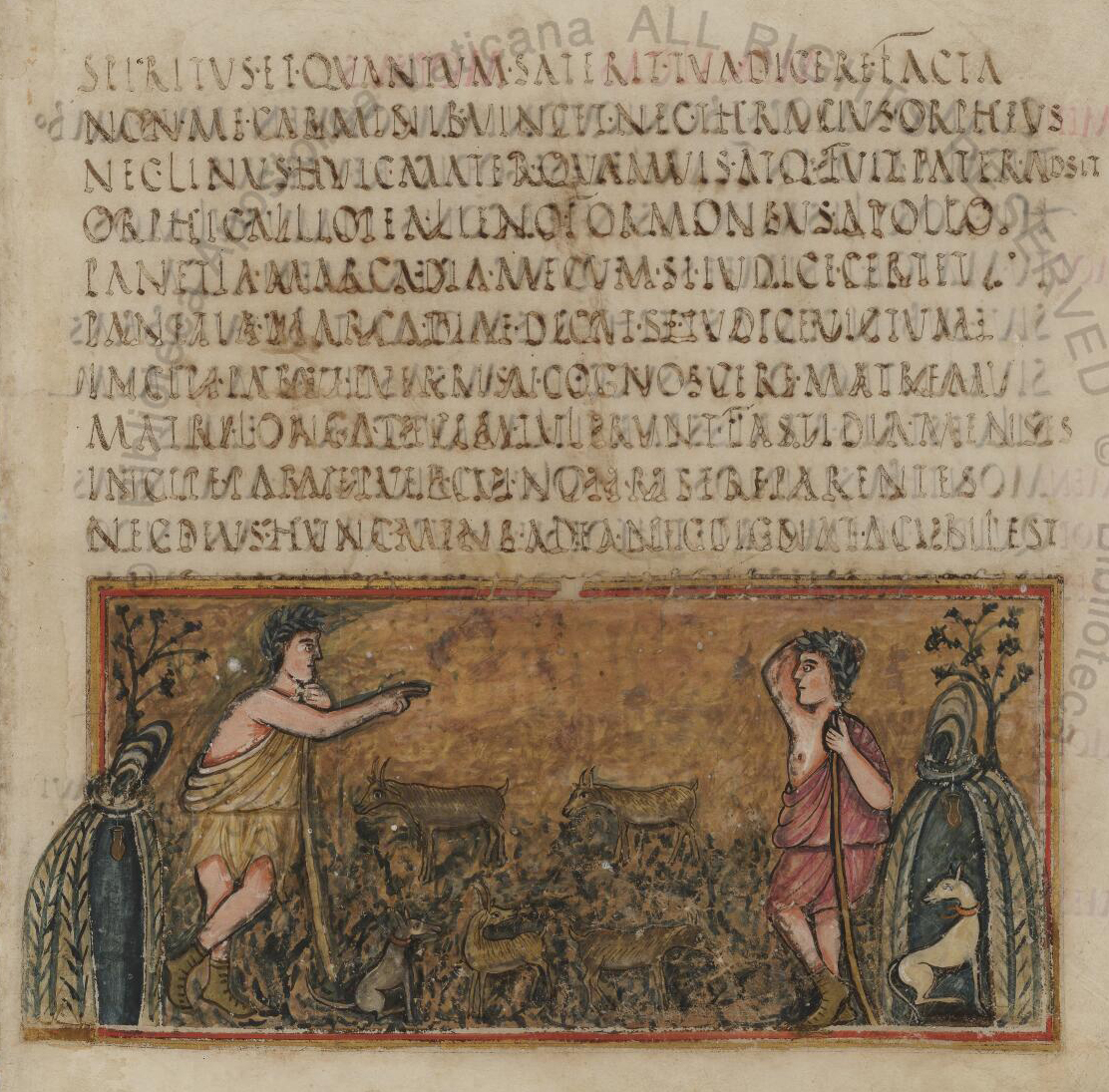
Folio 11 recto

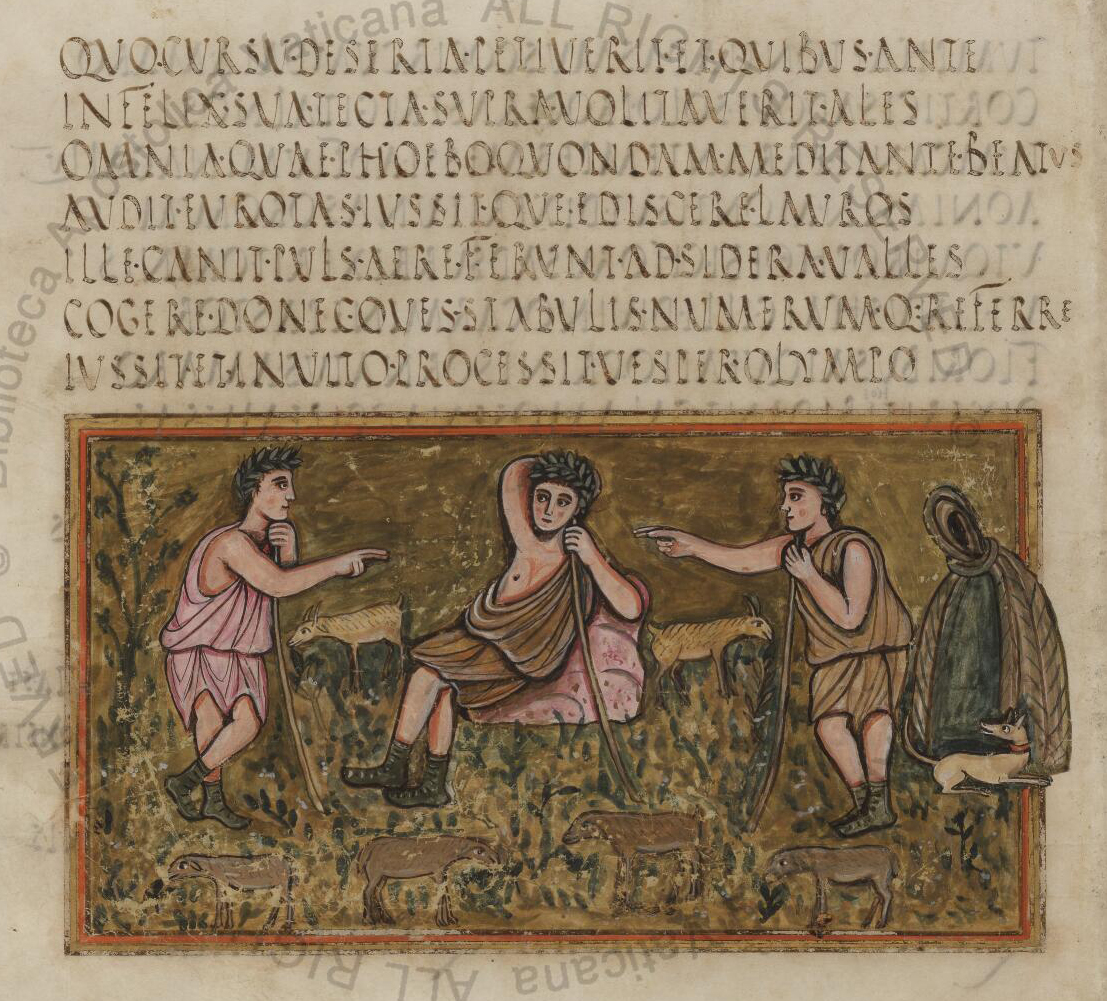
Folio 16 recto

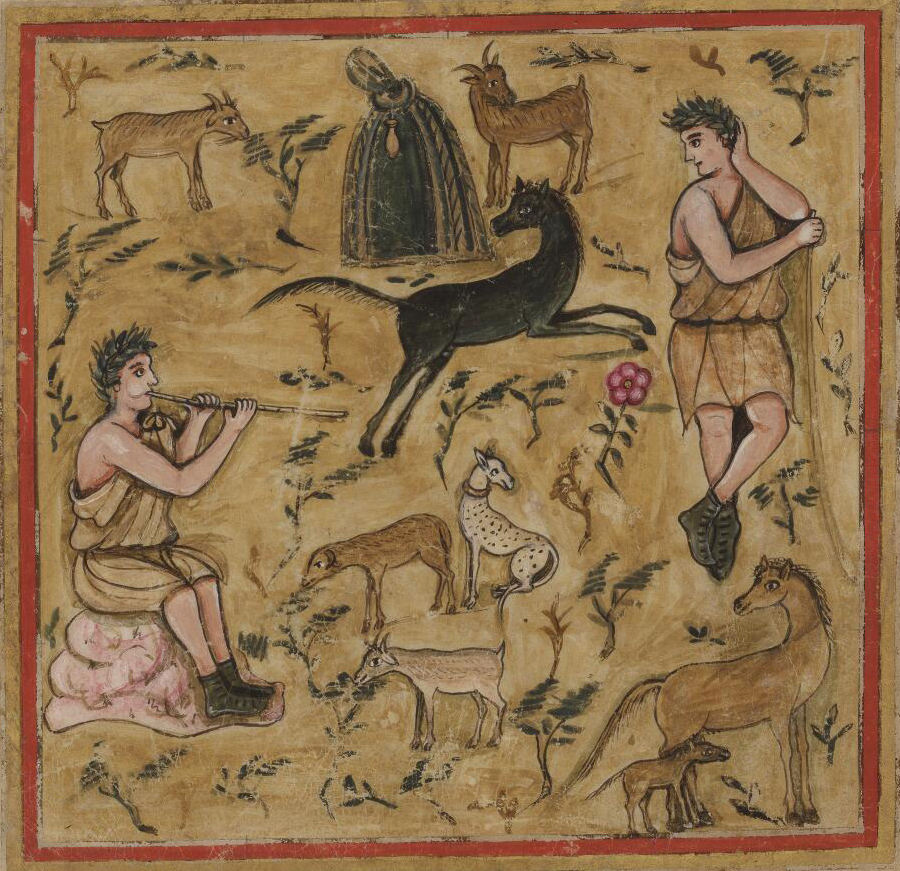
Folio 44 verso

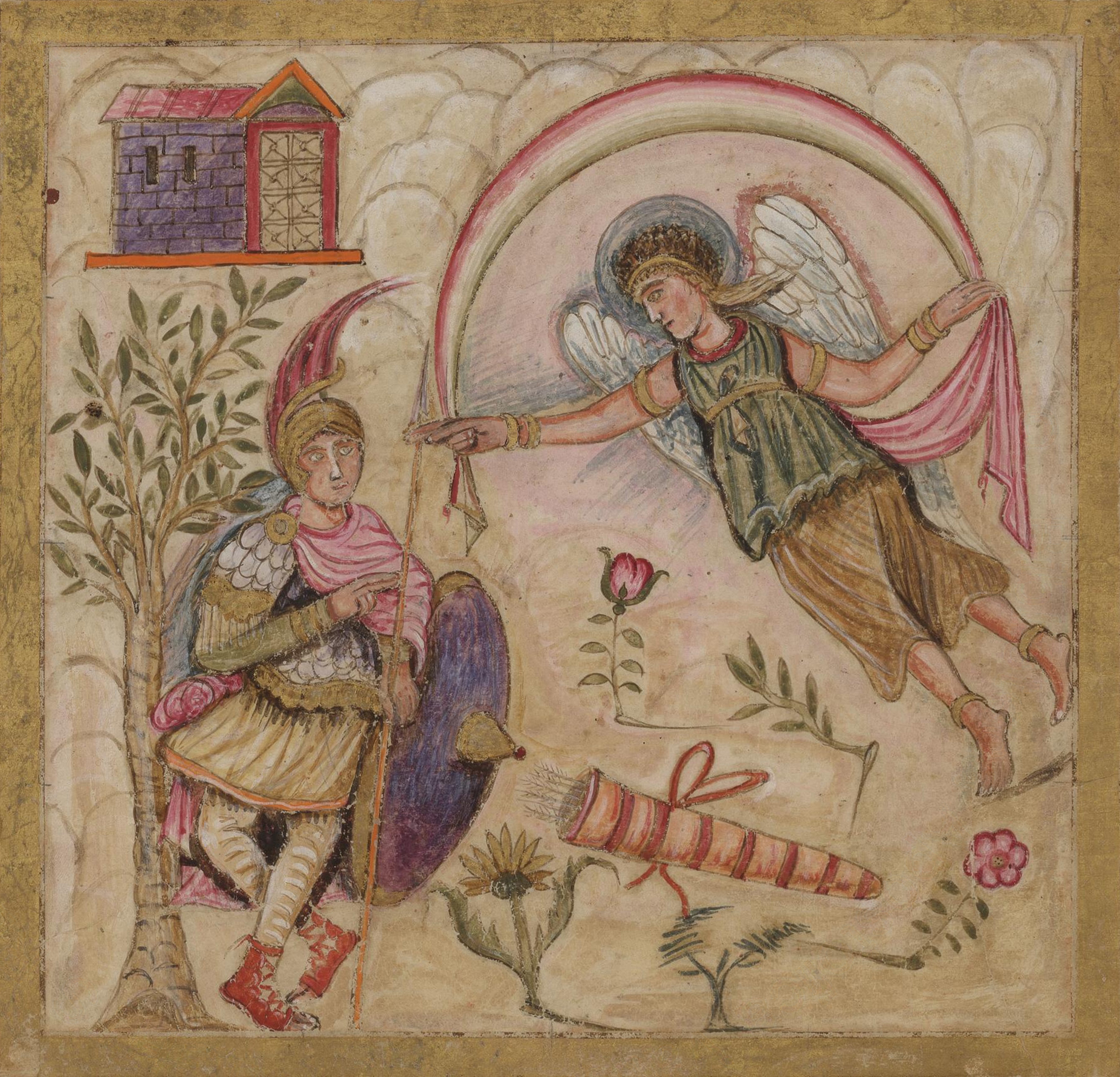
Folio 74 verso

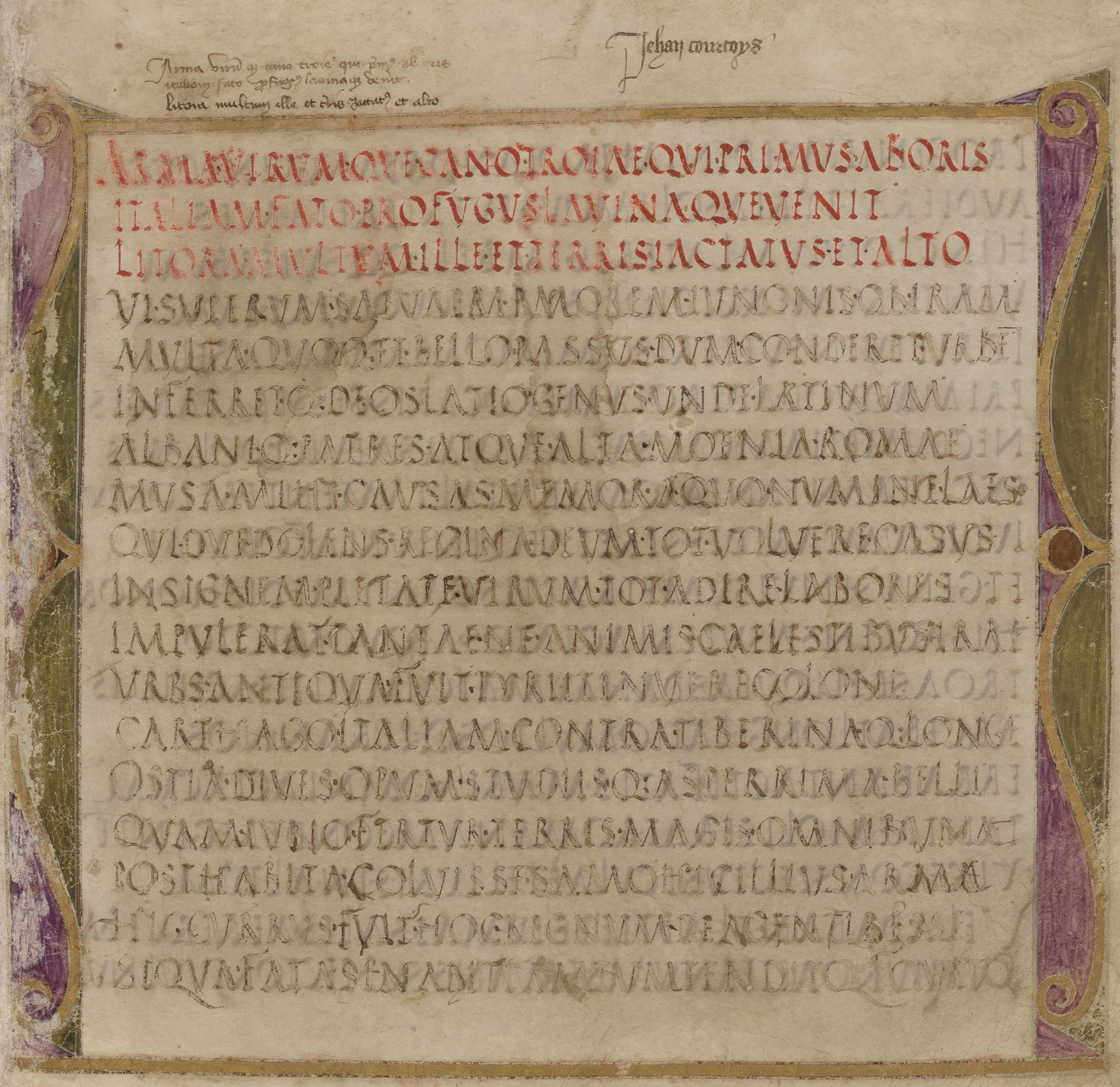
Folio 78 recto

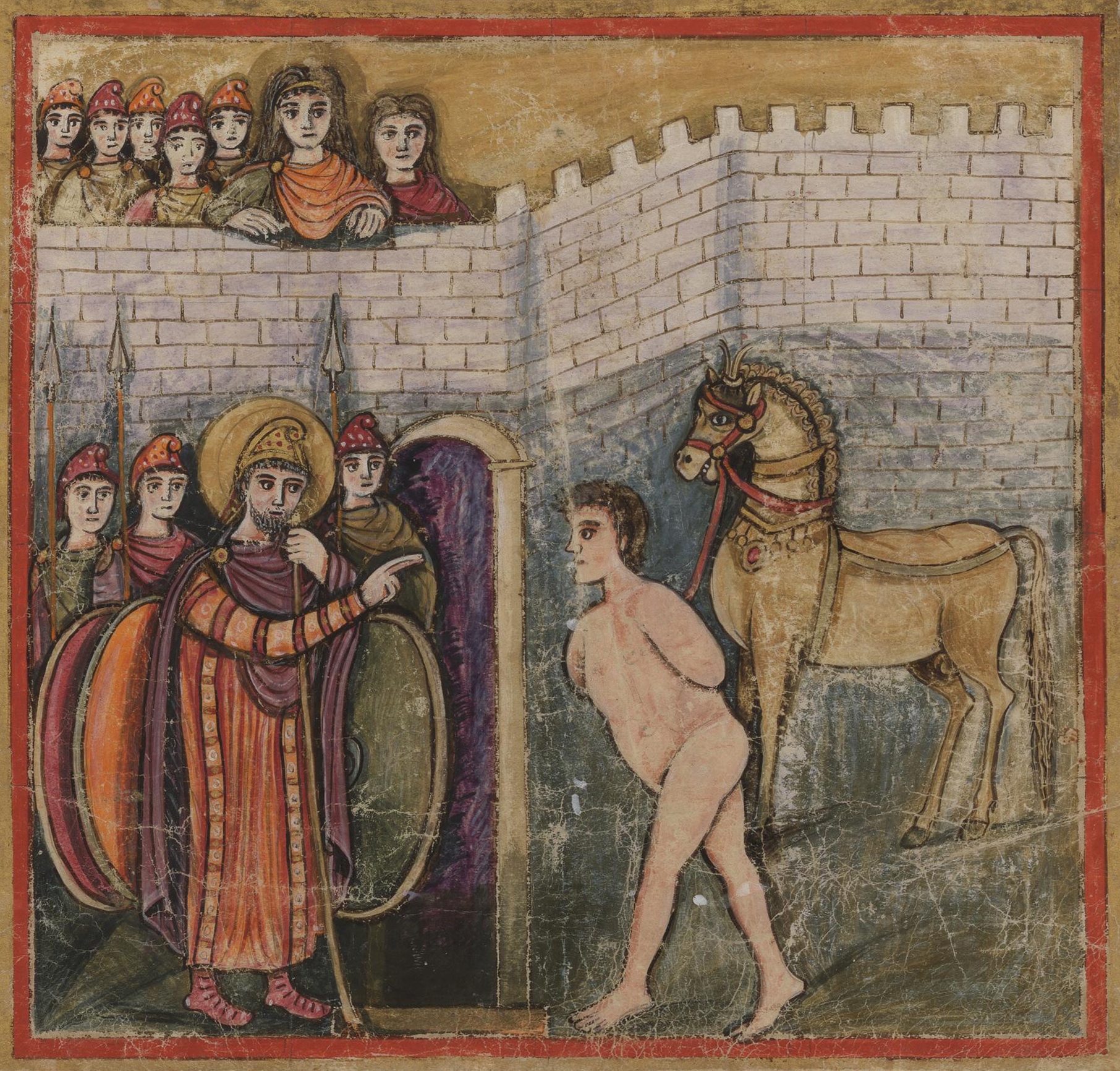
Folio 101 recto

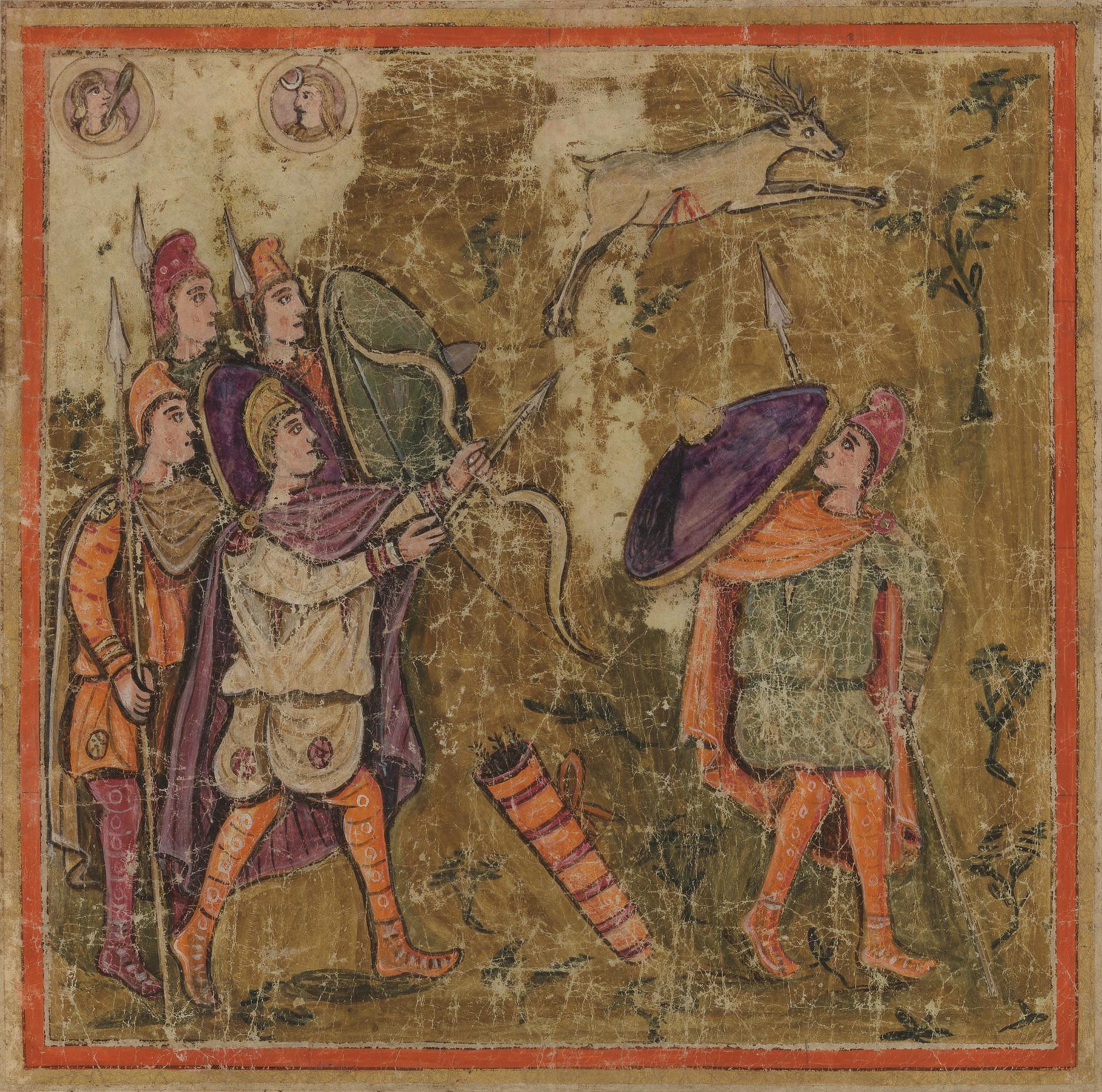
Folio 163 recto

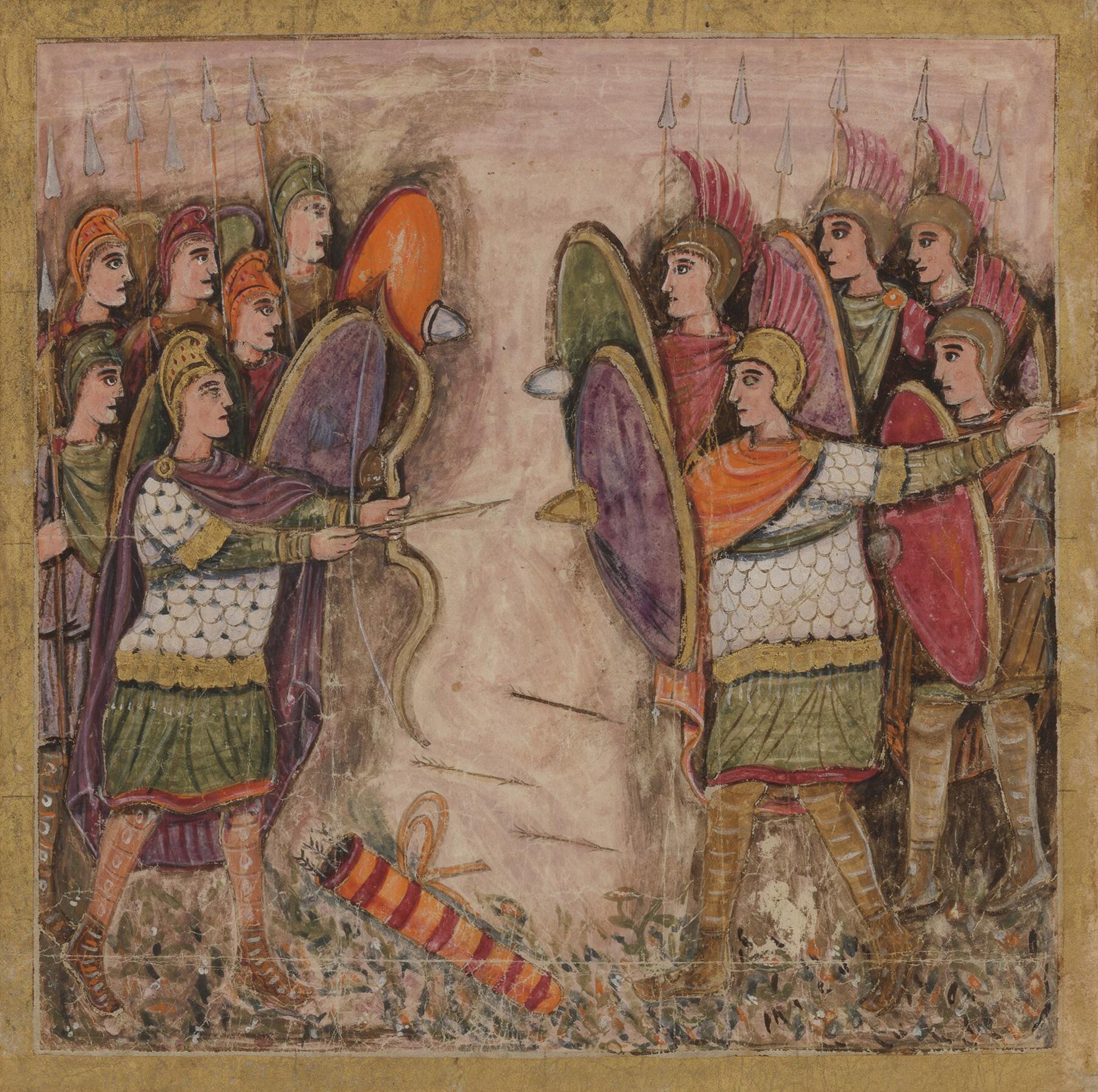
Folio 188 verso

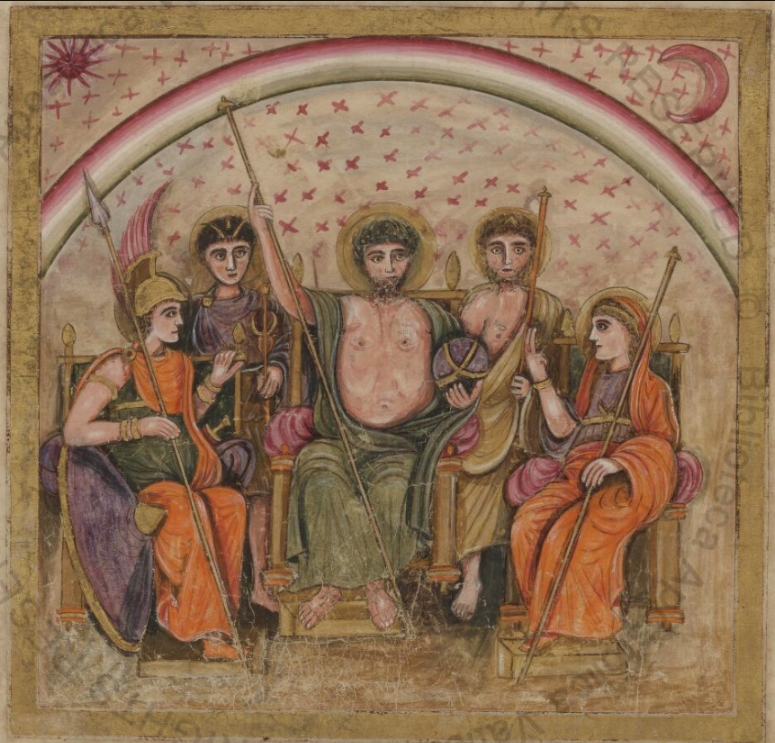
Folio 234 verso

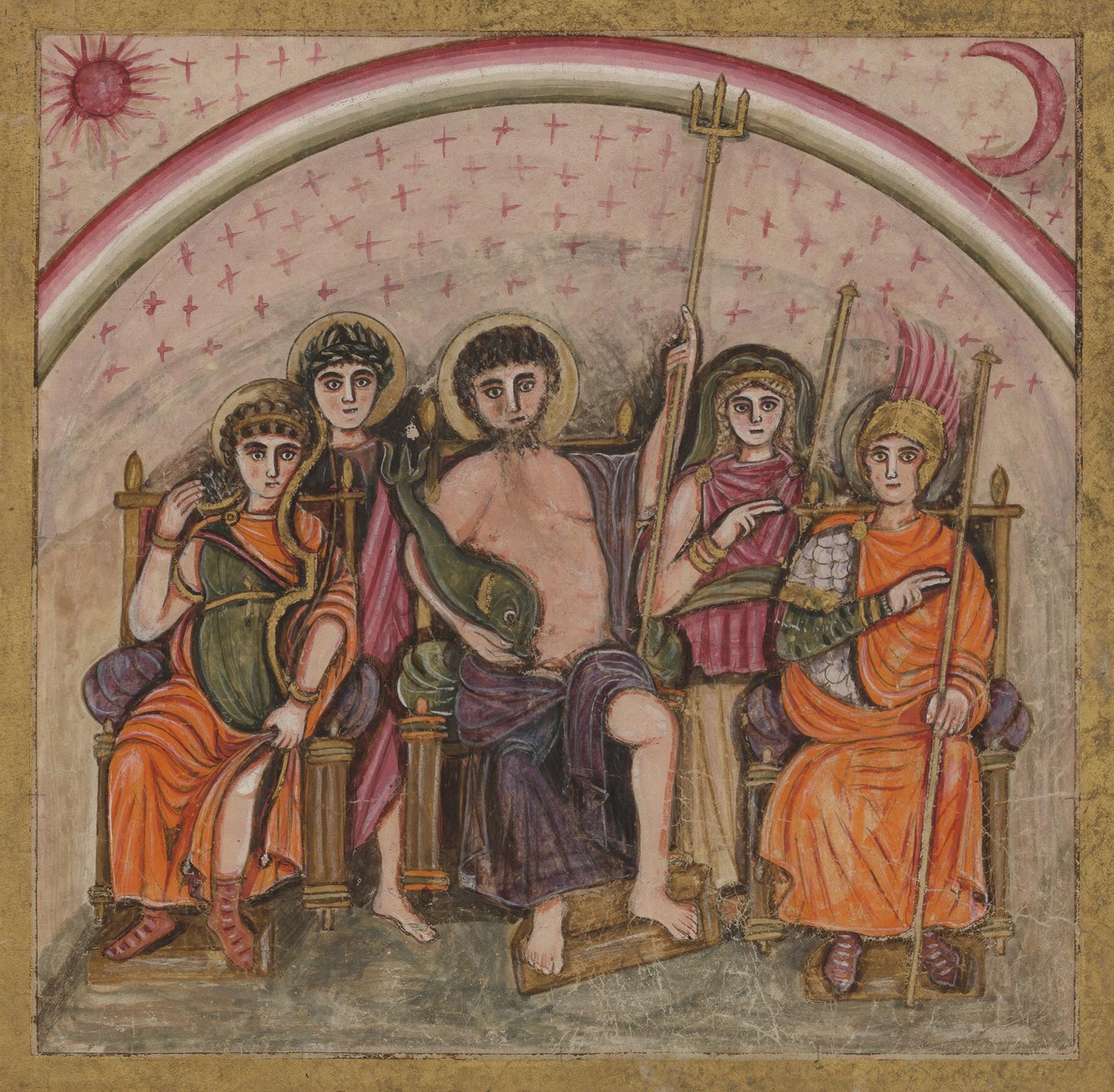
Folio 235 verso
