= Vergilius Vaticanus =

Early illustrated copy of Virgil

The Vergilius Vaticanus
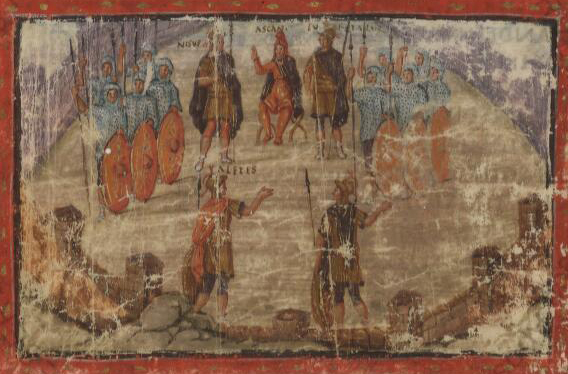
- Ascanius and Trojan council, Folio 73 verso
- Also known as: Vatican Virgil
- Language: Latin
- Date: 4th century
- Provenance: Monastery of Saint-Martin
- Manuscript(s): MSCod.Vat. lat. 3225
- Sources: Aeneid, Georgics

The Vergilius Vaticanus, also known as Vatican Virgil (Vatican, Biblioteca Apostolica, Cod. Vat. lat. 3225), is a Late Antique illuminated manuscript containing fragments of Virgil's Aeneid and Georgics. It was made in Rome in around 400 CE, and is one of the oldest surviving sources for the text of the Aeneid. It is the oldest of just three remaining ancient illustrated manuscripts of classical literature.

== Contents ==
The two other surviving illustrated manuscripts of classical literature are the Vergilius Romanus and the Ambrosian Iliad. The Vergilius Vaticanus is not to be confused with the Vergilius Romanus (Vatican City, Biblioteca Apostolica, Cod. Vat. lat. 3867) or the unillustrated Vergilius Augusteus, two other ancient Vergilian manuscripts in the Biblioteca Apostolica.

Virgil created a classic of Roman literature in the Aeneid. He used vivid locations and emotions to create images through poetry in the story. It discusses Aeneas and his Trojan comrades wandering into the seas until reaching their final destination in Italy after escaping the city of Troy after the Trojan War. The narrative includes themes of love, loss, and war. The Trojan War is an inspiration and a catalyst in a long line of epic poetry that came after Virgil.

== Attribution ==
The illustrations were added by three different painters, all of whom used iconographic copybooks. The first worked on the Georgics and parts of the Eclogues; the other two worked on the Aeneid. Each individual artist's illustrations are apparent based on his ability. The first artist is distinguished by his knowledge of spatial perspective and anatomy. His illustrations creates in the Georgics and Eclogues focus on his skill of creating distances and landscapes. The illustration of the herd being led to water is found in the artist's illustration of the Georgics. Each figure and object in the background is distinguishable with a realistic spatial arrangement.

Compared to the first artist, the second artist, who worked on the Aeneid, lacks the same familiarity with spatial perspective. The inclusion of crowds with buildings, people and mountains creates a striking contrast in the discovery of Carthage. There are ideas of spatial perspective, realistic space and figures in the third artist's illustrations. He used his ability to depict a realistic background based on his skill in human anatomy. One example was where the deceased Dido lays in repose in her decorated bedchamber in the Lamentation Over Dido.

== Description ==
There are 76 surviving leaves in the manuscript with 50 illustrations. If, as was common practice at the time, the manuscript contained all of the canonical works of Virgil, the manuscript would originally have had about 440 leaves and 280 illustrations. The illustrations are contained within frames and include landscapes and architectural and other details.

Many of the folios survive in fragments. Some fragments are grouped in fours or fives. There are 50 damaged illustrations in poor condition. It is simple to reconstruct the original book based on each fragment.

Of the several editions of Virgil, the Vergilius Vaticanus is the first edition in codex form. It may have been copied from a set of scrolls, which caused a lack of clarity with the transmission of the text. There was a well-organized workshop that created the Vergilius Vaticanus. By leaving spaces at certain places in the text, a master scribe planned the inclusion of illustrations when copying the text.

Out of tradition and convenience, there were iconographic models that were from three different artists who filled in the illustrations. For the painter to finish this work, a set of illustrated rolls was studied and adapted which were to serve as iconographic models for the Aeneid.

These kinds of small illustrations were placed in the columns of text which was written in papyrus style on rolls.

=== Text and script ===
The text was written by a single scribe in rustic capitals. As was common at the time, words are not separated by whitespace; a dot is used instead. One scribe used a late antique brown ink to write the entire text. Using eight-power magnification, the ink is grainless which appears smooth and well-preserved. The Vergilius Vaticanus is in very good condition, compared to other manuscripts from the same time period, which had been inefficiently prepared causing the parchment to break from oak gallnuts and ferrous sulphate. For distinctions to be made between thick and thin strokes the scribe used a trimmed broad pen. The pen was nearly held at 60 degrees where most strokes would occur.

=== Illustrations ===
The miniatures are set within the text column, although a few miniatures occupy a full page. The human figures are painted in classical style with natural proportions and drawn with vivacity. The illustrations often convey the illusion of depth quite well. The gray ground of the landscapes blend into bands of rose, violet, or blue to give the impression of a hazy distance. The interior scenes are based on earlier understanding of perspective, but occasional errors suggest that the artists did not fully understand the models used. The style of these miniatures has much in common with the surviving miniatures of the Quedlinburg Itala fragment and have also been compared to the frescos found at Pompeii. Each miniature had a proportional figure with a landscape creating a hazy effect, featuring classical architecture and clothing.

Popular myths such as Hylas and the Nymphs were represented by the nine surviving illustrations of the Georgics through a command of pastoral and genre scenes by competent artists. The illustrations in the Aeneid are mixed with the Georgics; however, the Georgics’ artistic ingenuity is greater than the Aeneid illustrations. Without decorated frames and painted backgrounds or landscape settings, the illustrated verses used only the essentials for telling a story using minimal figures and objects. Neither framed nor painted in the background, the Vergilius Vaticanus uses a roll of illustrations in the Papyrus style.

==== Miniatures ====
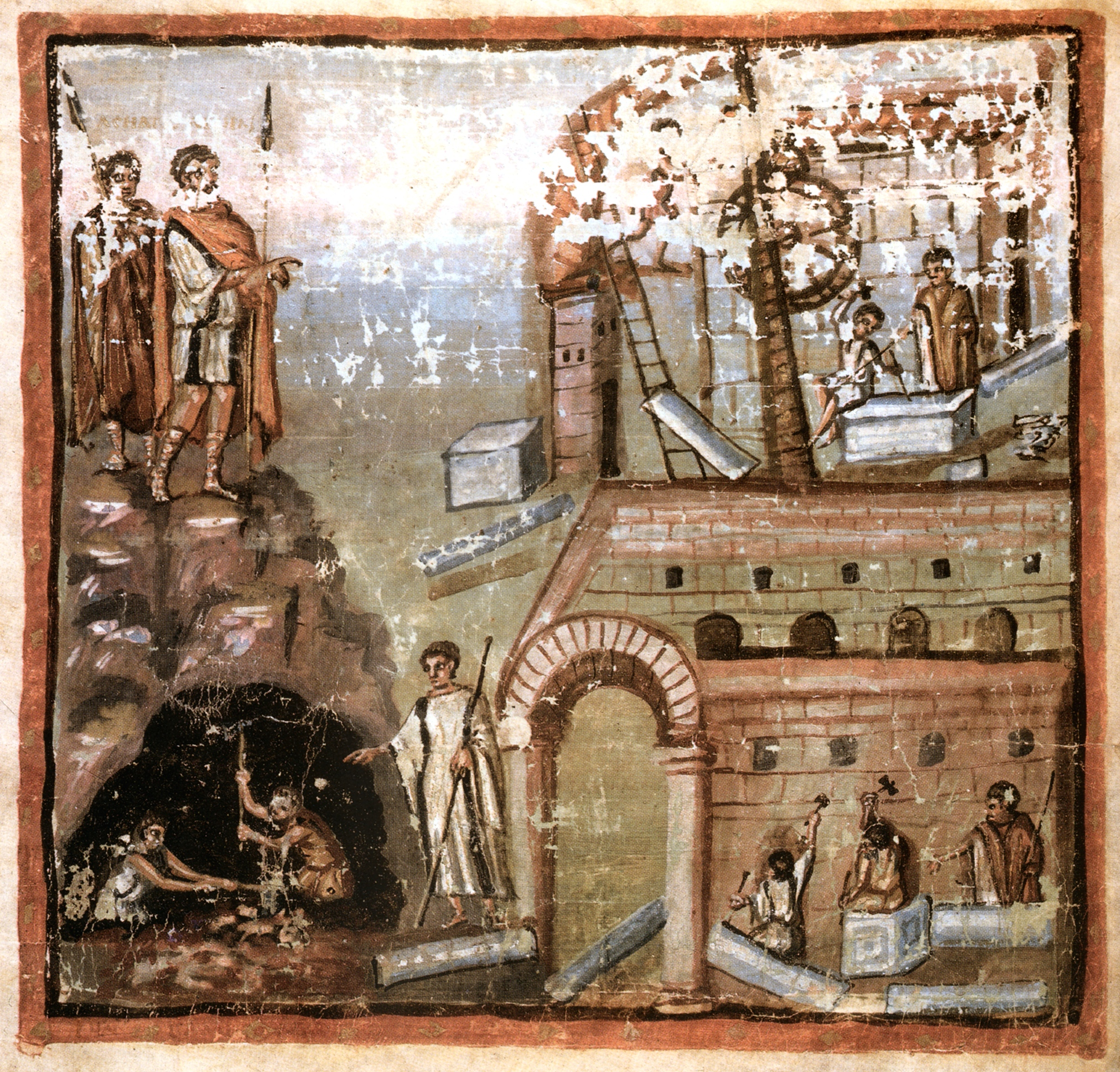
Aeneas and Achates Discover Carthage, Folio 13 recto

One important miniature depicts Aeneas and Achates discovering Carthage (folio 13). The artist sacrificed style for pictorial accuracy in order to capture the city in its urgent progress and unity. There are two Trojans standing on a cliff surveying Carthage in an image that lacks perspective. Achates and Aeneas are identified with labels above their heads. Aeneas’ body provides material for examination such as deteriorated drapes of clothes which prevents Achates’ body from being examined. Aeneas’s awkwardly composed anatomy is created with the artist’s smooth and thick brushstrokes. The drapery unnaturally positions the legs after covering the body. Aeneas’s body, in contrast to Achates, implies speech based on the extended stance. Maintaining textual accuracy, there is a clumsy perspective on the right of Aeneas which outlines Carthage. Two workers and an overseer, in the quarry below Aeneas, extracts raw materials for construction. There are stonemasons being watched by the supervisors in the background. Only stone arches and walls are being displayed, not the actions in progress.

=== Materials ===
Preparing 220 sheets of parchment paper measured from 25 by 43 centimeters (10 by 17 in) was the first step in the bookmaking process. This is comparable to other luxurious manuscripts of the time, some of which required approximately 74 sheep in order for the manuscript to be created. Despite a few holes in the Vergilius Vaticanus, it remained in excellent quality. Parchment is very thin with a smooth polished surface which are described by being the best books of the period. The hair side is slightly yellow creating a curl while the side of the flesh is white. The usage of the parchment at extensive length will lead to deterioration, fortunately the parchment can be used at great length based on its stiffness.

== Provenance ==
The manuscript was probably made for a pagan noble. This late antique illuminated manuscript remained actively used for at least 200 years in Italy. The first record of the almost complete manuscript showed up at the monastery of Saint-Martin in Tours during the mid-ninth century. Before the manuscript was broken up and parts lost, the illustrations from the manuscript were studied delicately by artists. Those artists later established one of the most influential painting schools of Carolingian painting. One of those artists copied two figures from the manuscript to use in the Vivian Bible.

In 1448, the Italian humanist Giovanni Pontano studied and collected the manuscript. At that time, the manuscript was missing around 164 folios. In addition, several folios appeared to have been cut by someone else. In around 1514, the manuscript, after it disappeared and suffered more dismemberment, showed up in Rome in the circle of Raphael where several of the surviving illustrations were copied and adapted for other purpose. People feared that the manuscript would eventually completely deteriorate, so a copy of all the illustrations from the manuscript was created in the circle of Raphael (now Princeton MS104). In 1513, the manuscript was transferred to Rome, to the library of the humanist Pietro Bembo. When Pope Leo X died in 1521, Bembo retired to Padua and brought the manuscript with him. Next, Pietro Bembo passed down the manuscript to his son, Torquato Bembo. Finally in 1579, the manuscript returned to Rome and some folios got trimmed down. Fulvio Orsini bought the manuscript from Torquato Bembo. Fulvio Orsini eventually bequeathed his library to the Vatican library in 1600. Shortly after 1642, the manuscript was altered due to rebinding the codex and added patches on the parchment.

== Facsimiles ==
The manuscript was published with color reproductions in 1980.

Print Facsimile: Wright, David H. Vergilius Vaticanus: vollständige Faksimile-Ausgabe im Originalformat des Codex Vaticanus Latinus 3225 der Biblioteca Apostolica Vaticana. Graz, Austria: Akademische Druck- u. Verlagsanstalt, 1984.

Digital Facsimile: Vatican Library

All the illustrations are online, with commentary, in Wright, David H., The Vatican Vergil, a Masterpiece of Late Antique Art, Berkeley, University of California Press, 1993, google books, full online text
