= Vergilius Augusteus =

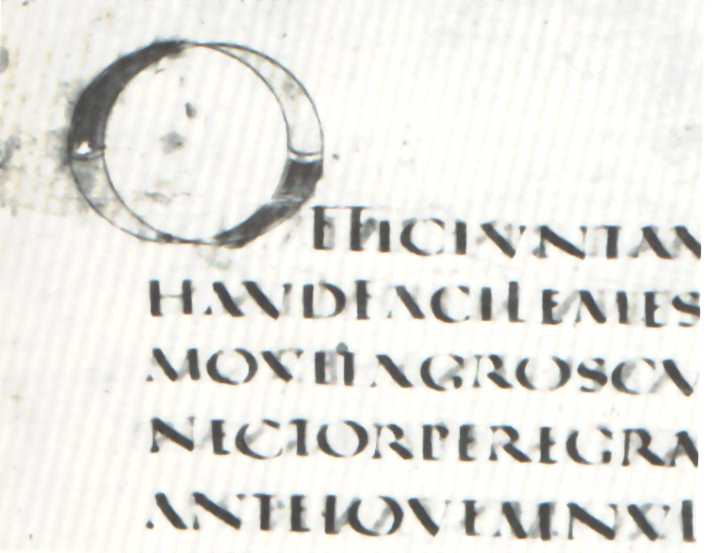
An initial O from the Vatican Library fragment of the Vergileus Augusteus.

The Vergilius Augusteus is a manuscript from late antiquity, containing the works of the Roman author Virgil, written probably around the 4th century. There are two other collections of Virgil manuscripts, the Vergilius Vaticanus and the Vergilius Romanus. They are early examples of illuminated manuscripts; the Augusteus is not illuminated but has decorated initial letters at the top of each page. These letters do not mark divisions of the text, but rather are used at the beginning of whatever line happened to fall at the top of the page. These decorated initials are the earliest surviving such initials.

Only seven leaves of the manuscript survive, four of which are in the Vatican Library (MS Vat. lat. 3256), and the remaining three in the Staatsbibliothek zu Berlin (Lat. fol. 416). The leaves contain fragments of Virgil's Georgics and the Aeneid. The fragments themselves are unremarkable, but they are written in Roman square capitals, which shows that square capitals were used in handwriting and not only for stone inscriptions.

Due to its great age, it was originally believed that the manuscript was written in the time of Roman emperor Caesar Augustus, hence its name. In the later Middle Ages the manuscript was kept in the abbey of St. Denis in Paris.

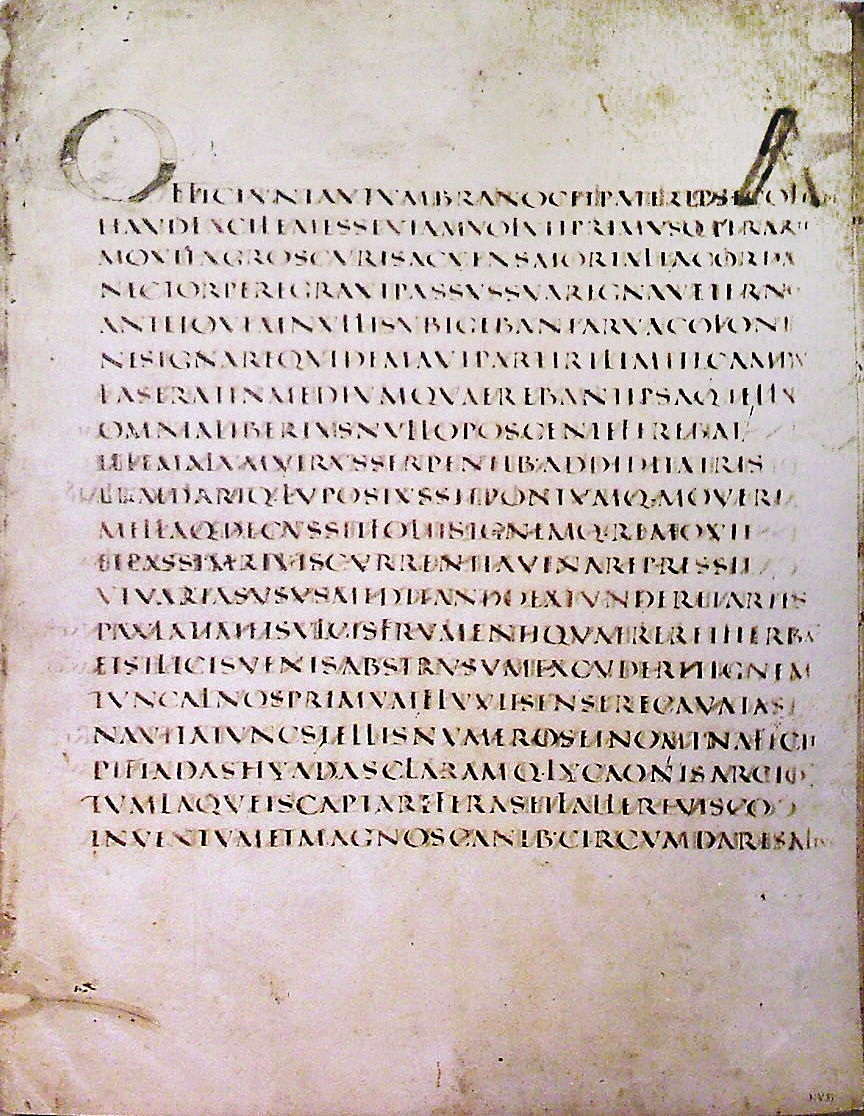
Vatican folio 121

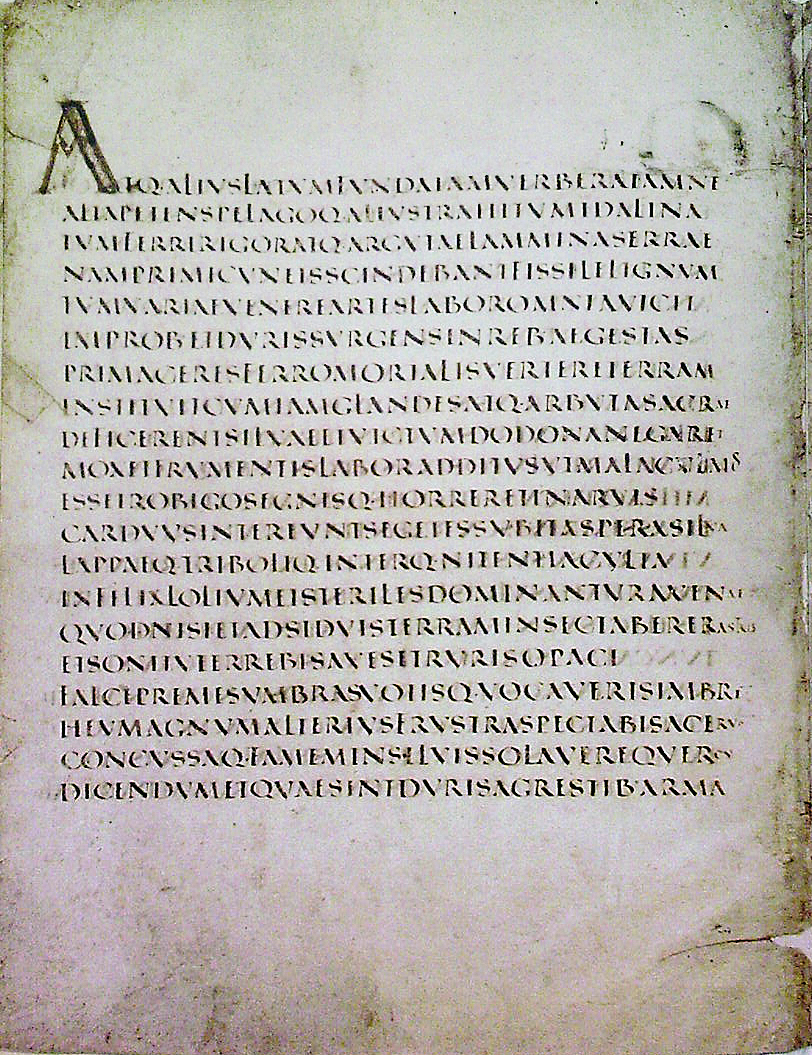
Vatican folio 141

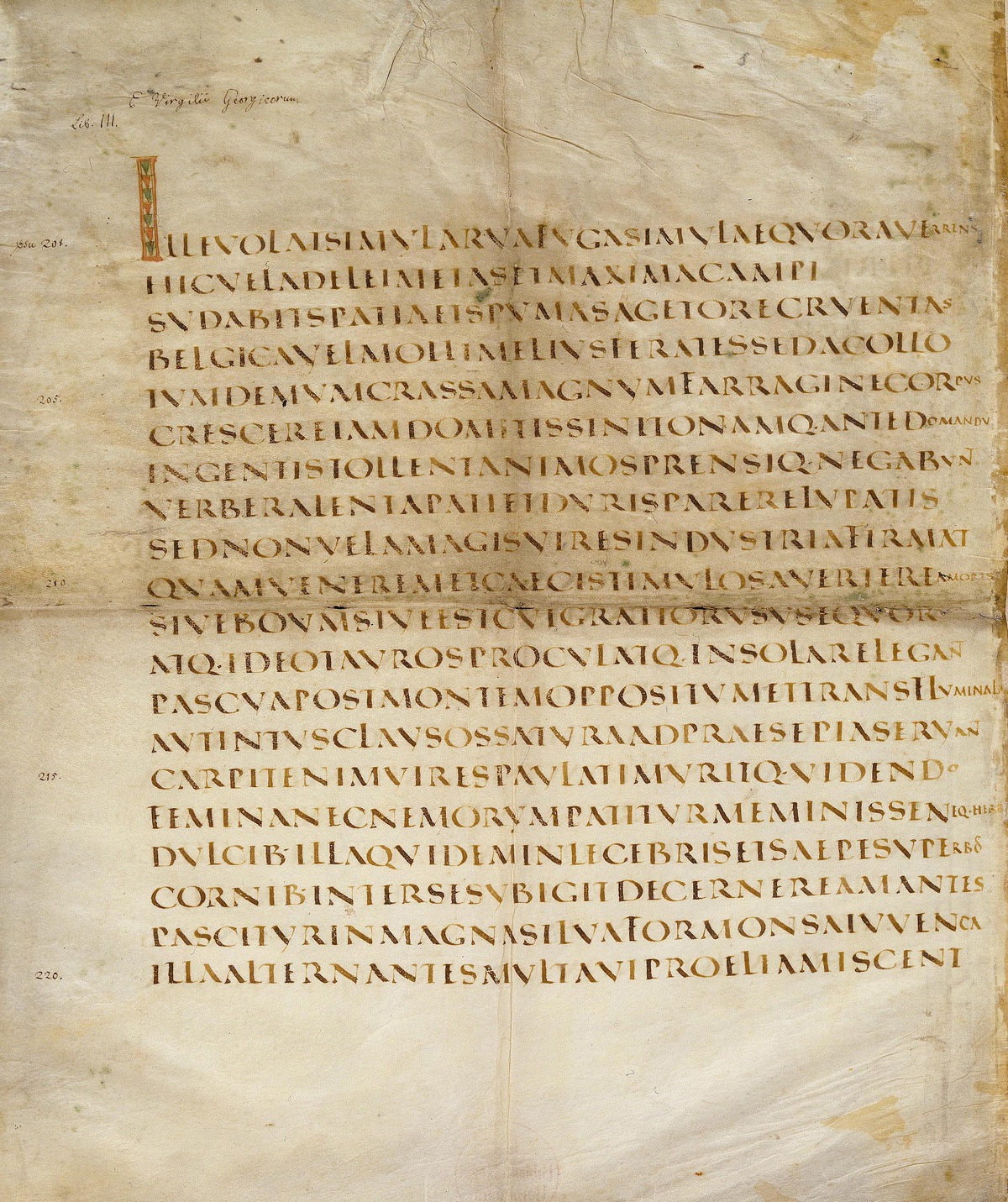
Berlin folio 416
