= Roman square capitals =

Ancient Roman style of inscription

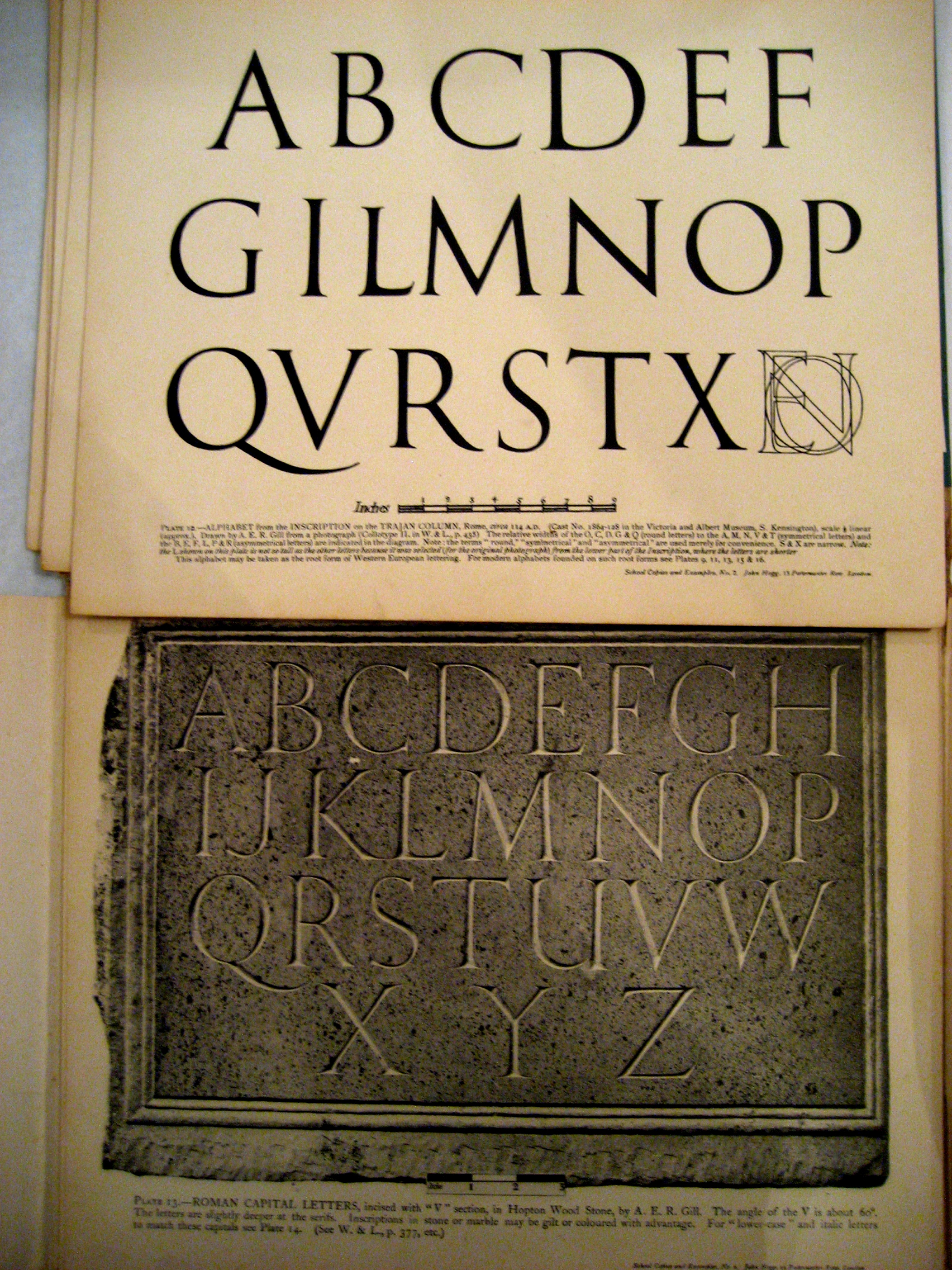
A drawing and photographed carving by Eric Gill of the "Trajan" capitals on the Column of Trajan

Roman square capitals, also called capitalis monumentalis, inscriptional capitals, elegant capitals and capitalis quadrata, are an ancient Roman form of writing, and the basis for modern capital letters. Square capitals are characterized by sharp, straight lines, supple curves, thick and thin strokes, angled stressing and incised serifs. When written in documents this style is known as Latin book hand.

== History ==
=== Antiquity ===
Square capitals were used to write inscriptions, and less often to supplement everyday handwriting as Latin book hand. For everyday writing, the Romans used a current cursive hand known as Latin cursive. Notable examples of square capitals used for inscriptions are found on the Roman Pantheon, Trajan's Column, and the Arch of Titus, all in Rome. These Roman capitals are also called majuscules, as a counterpart to minuscule letters such as Merovingian and Carolingian.

Before the 4th century AD, square capitals were used to write de luxe copies of the works of authors categorized as "pagan" by Christians, especially those of Virgil; the only three surviving manuscripts using this letter, among them the Vergilius Augusteus, contain works by Virgil. After the 5th century the square capitals fell out of use, except as a display lettering for titles and chapter headings in conjunction with various script hands for body text: for example, uncials.

Edward Catich is noted for the fullest development of the thesis that the inscribed Roman square capitals owed their form, including the serifs, wholly to the use of the flat brush, rather than to the exigencies of the chisel or other stone cutting tools. Although not universally accepted, the brushed-origin thesis had been proposed in the nineteenth century. Catich made a complete study and proposed a convincing ductus by which the forms were created, using a flat brush and then chisel. (Note: Edward Catich promulgated his views in two works, Letters Redrawn from the Trajan Inscription in Rome and The Origin of the Serif: Brush Writing and Roman Letters.)

==== Gallery ====
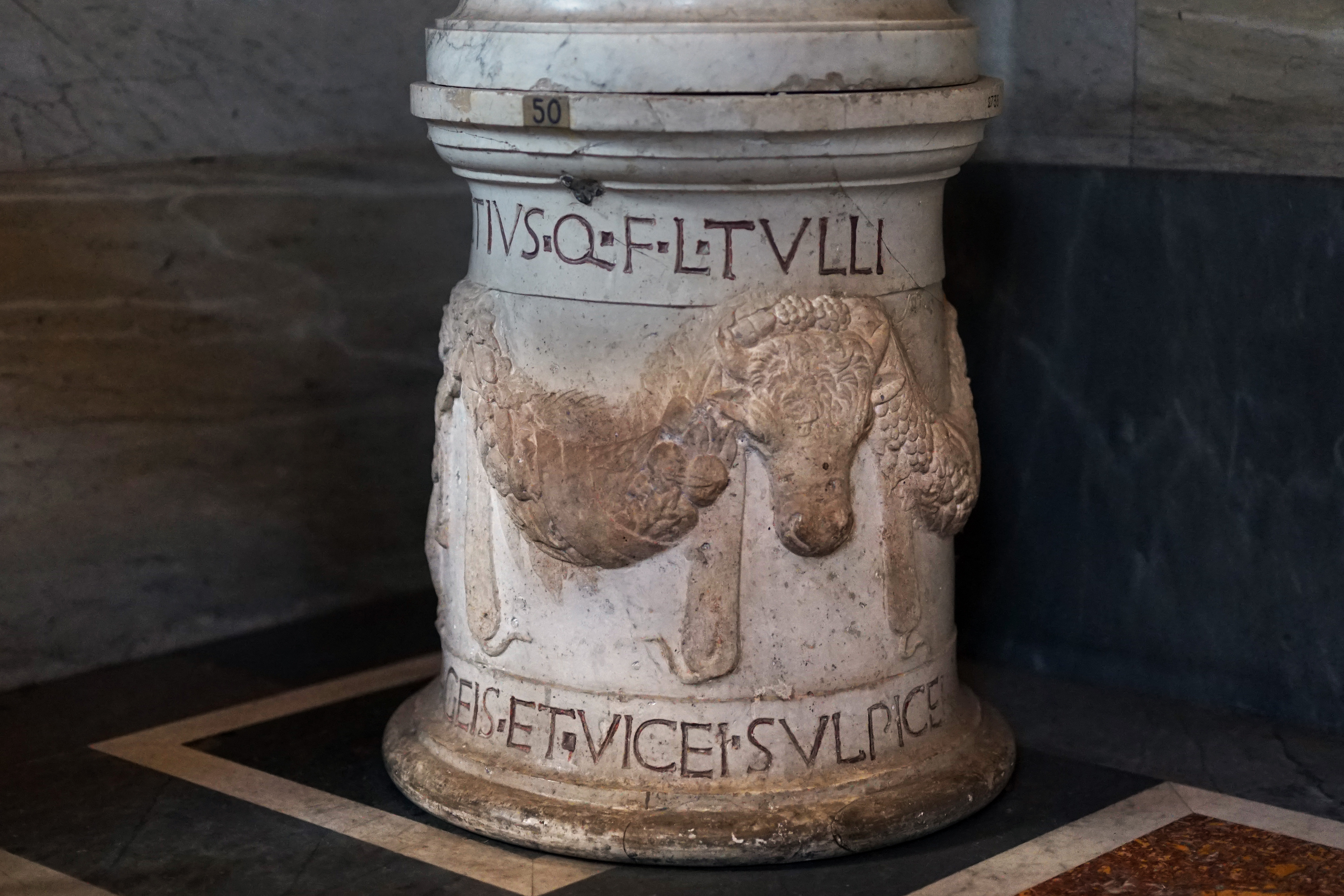
Inscription, 2nd to 1st century BC

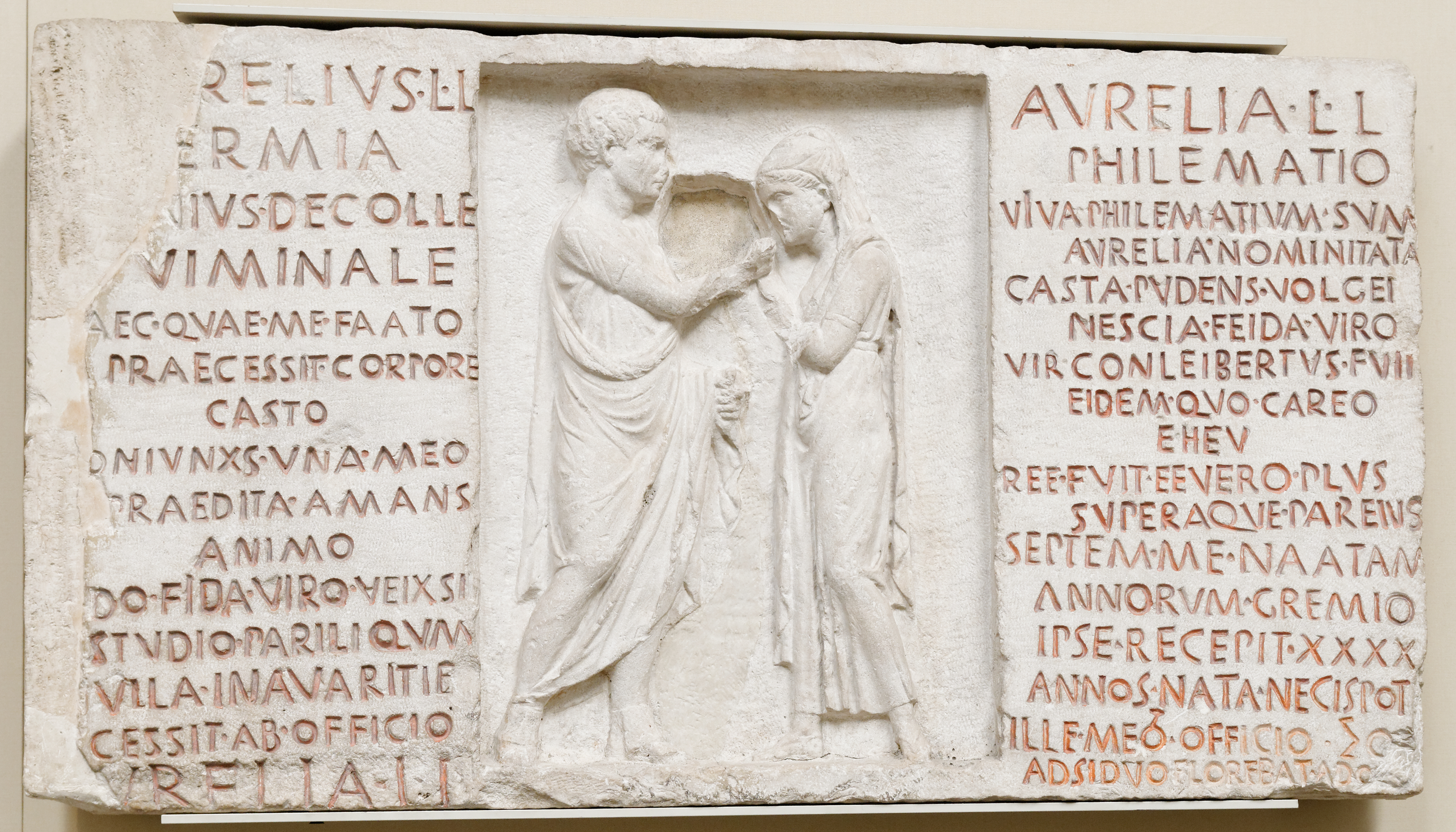
Funerary inscription, circa 80 BC (CIL VI, 9499)

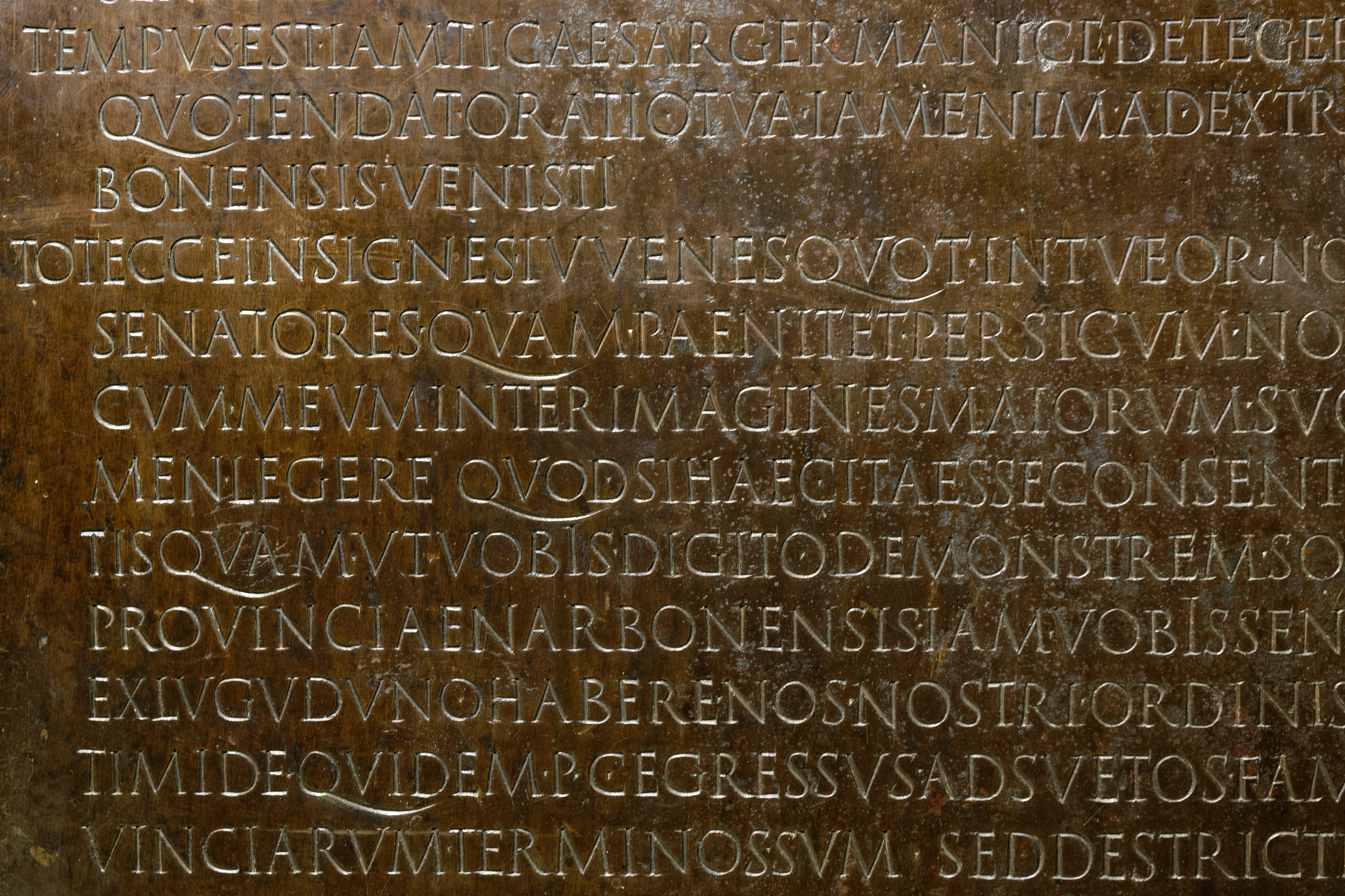
Close-up of the Lyon Tablet, a bronze tablet from after 48 AD

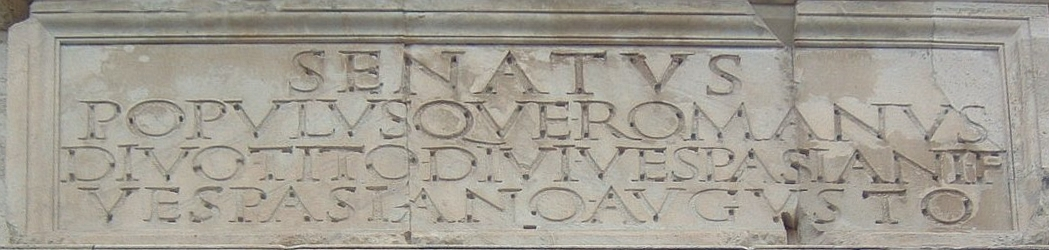
The SPQR inscriptional capitals on the Arch of Titus, c. 81 AD, are an example of inscriptional lettering which would have been infilled with bronze. Note the holes for the "tangs" of the cast bronze letters.

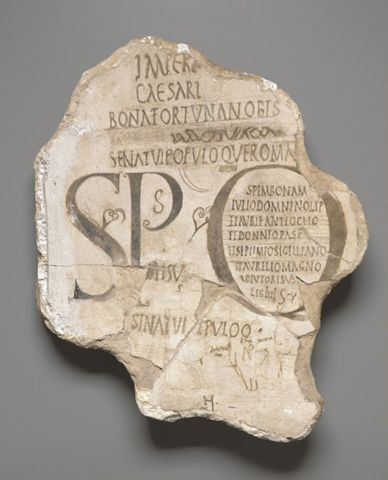
Ink and gypsum inscription from Dura-Europos, 193–211 AD

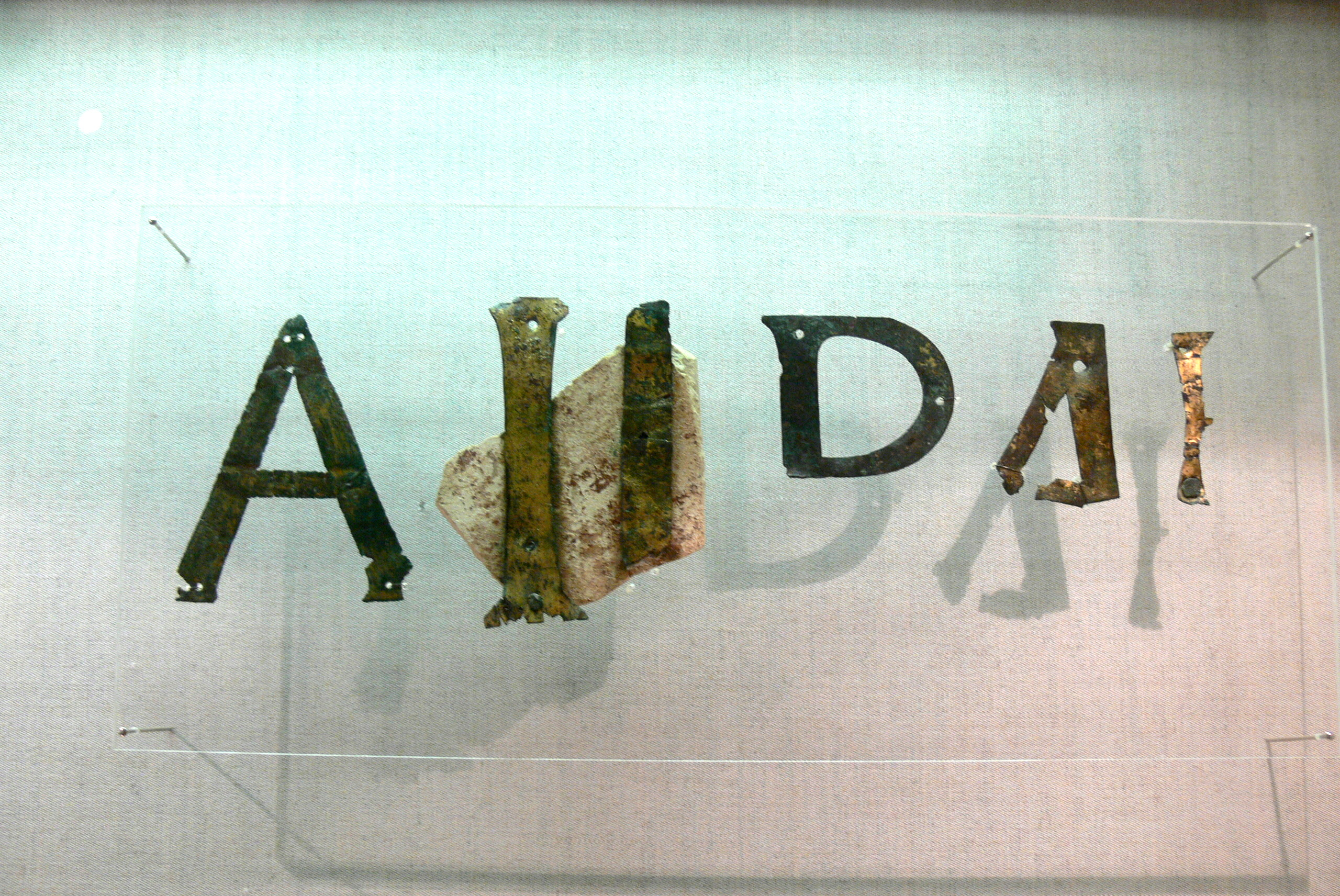
Gilded bronze letters from the eastern gate of Ancient Roman Biriciana, probably an inscription for emperor Caracalla

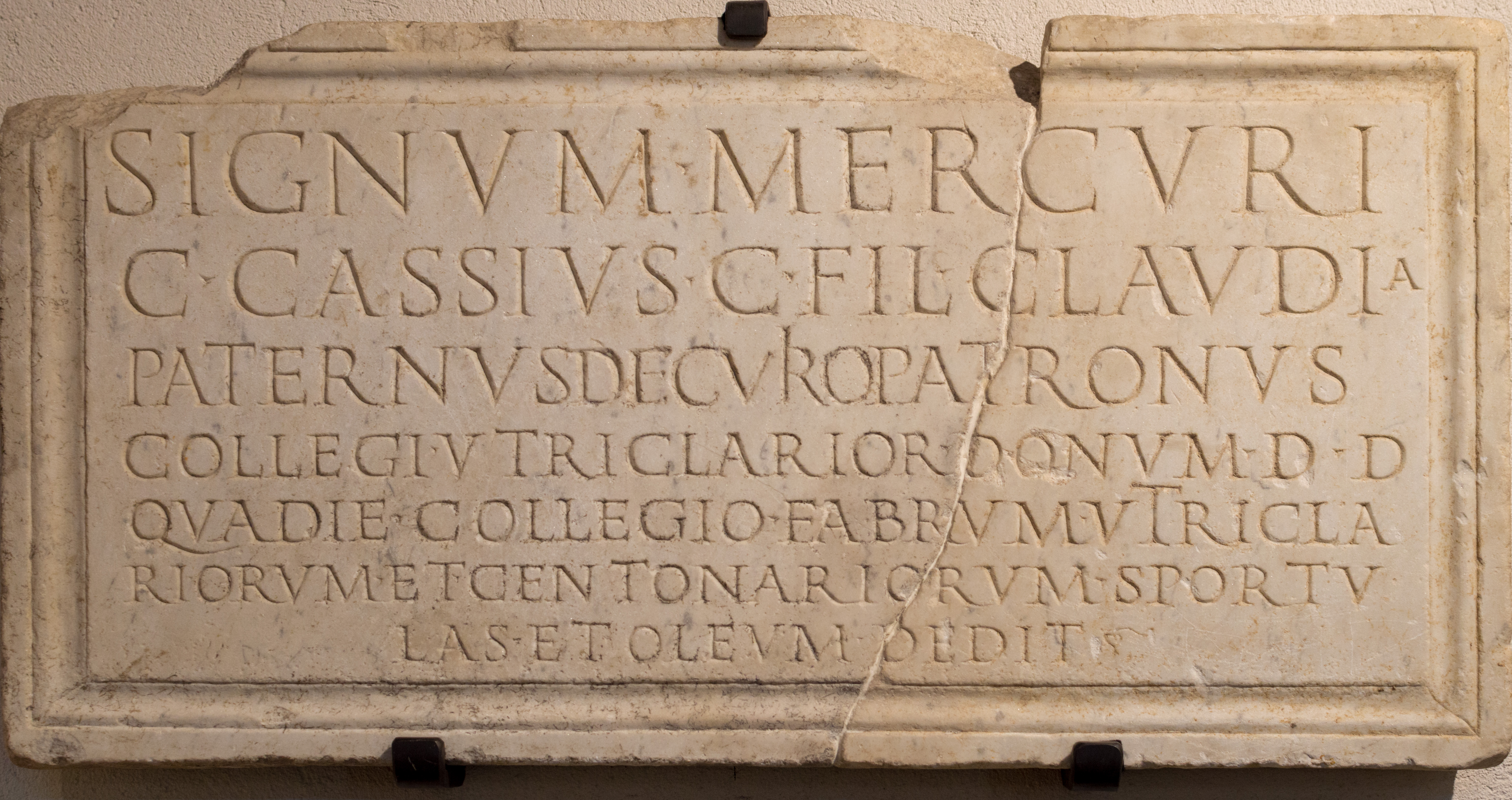
Inscription from the turn of the 2nd and 3rd century AD

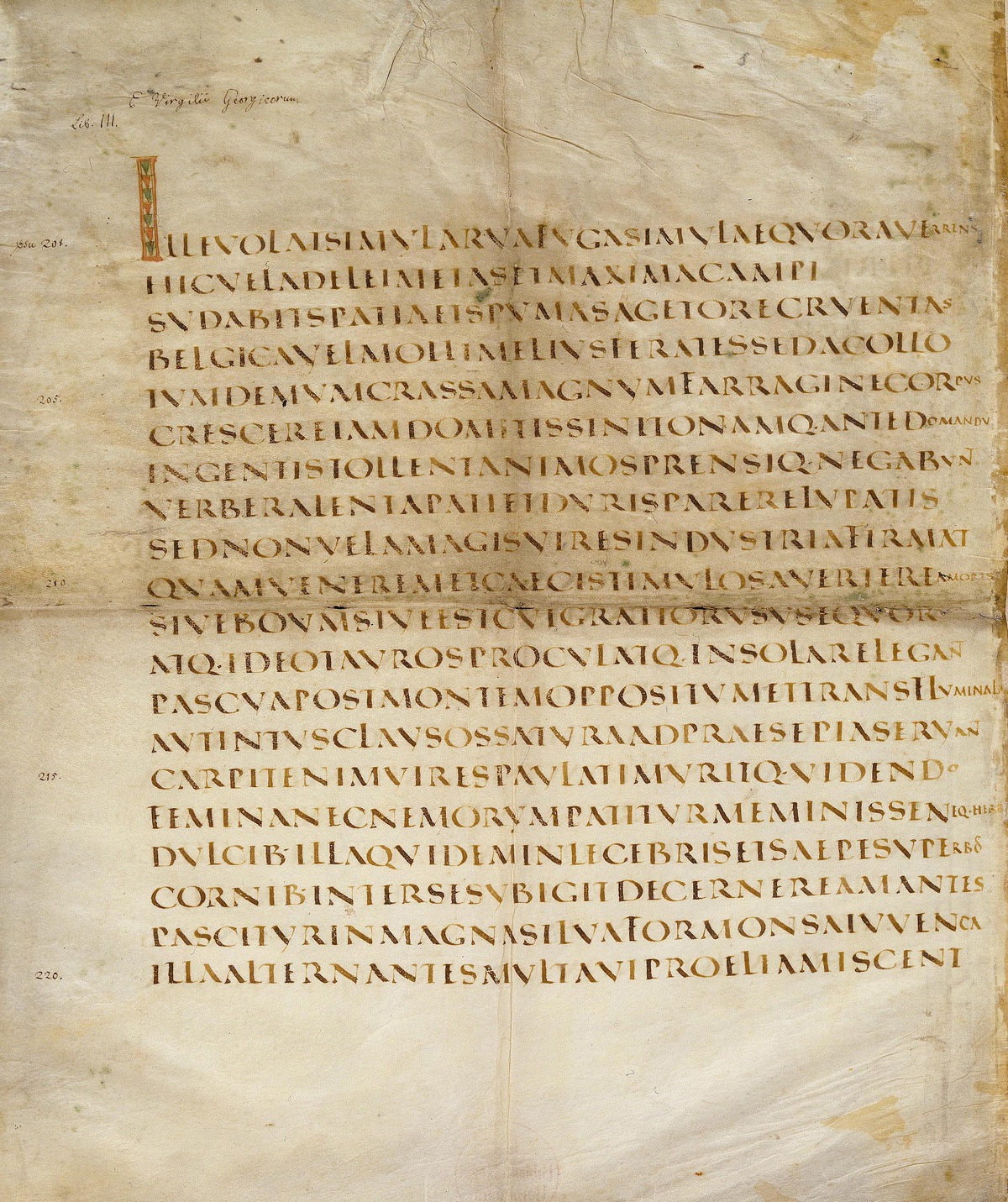
Folio of the 4th century Vergilius Augusteus with handwritten square capitals

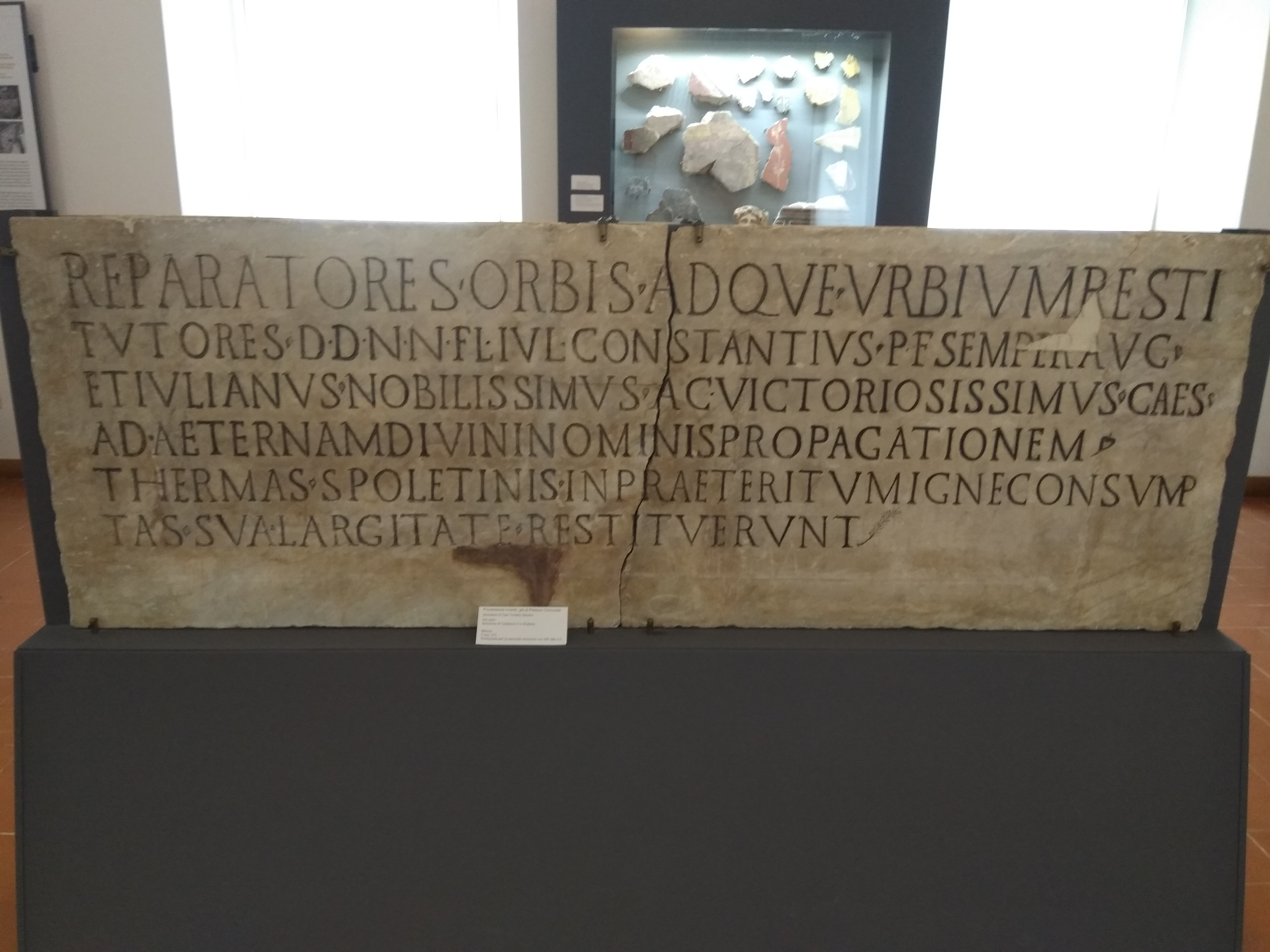
Inscription celebrating the restoration of the Baths of Spoletium, by order of Emperor Constantius II and caesar Julian, 355–360 AD (CIL XI, 4781)

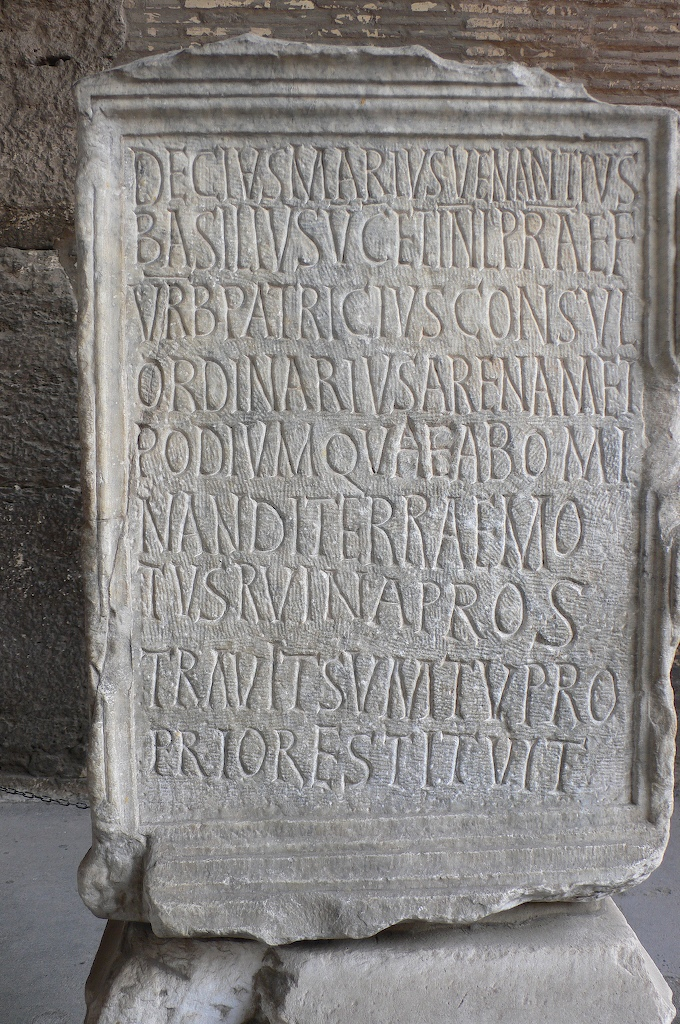
484–508 inscription to Decius Marius Venantius Basilius (CIL VI, 1716)

=== Later influence ===
==== Renaissance ====
Square capitals were greatly respected by artisans of the Renaissance such as Geoffroy Tory and Felice Feliciano.

==== Arts and Crafts movement ====
In the 19th and 20th centuries, they were a major inspiration for artisans of the Arts and Crafts movement such as Edward Johnston and Eric Gill, and so many signs and engravings created with an intentionally artistic design in the twentieth century are based on them.

==== Influence on modern typefaces ====
During the early era of the movable type printing press, Roman square capitals became the primary inspiration for the capital letters in early serif typefaces; Roman type, especially that developed by those associated with Aldus Manutius, came to produce a number of typefaces still used to the present day. (Note: Often referred to simply as "Bringhurst", Robert Bringhurst's Elements is widely respected as the current English-language authority on typographic style.) The 1989 digital typeface Trajan from Adobe is a direct, all-capital adaptation of the Roman square capitals on Trajan's column.

== See also ==
- Humanist font
- Palatino
- Roman cursive
- Rustic capitals
