= Uncial 0307 =

- New Testament manuscript
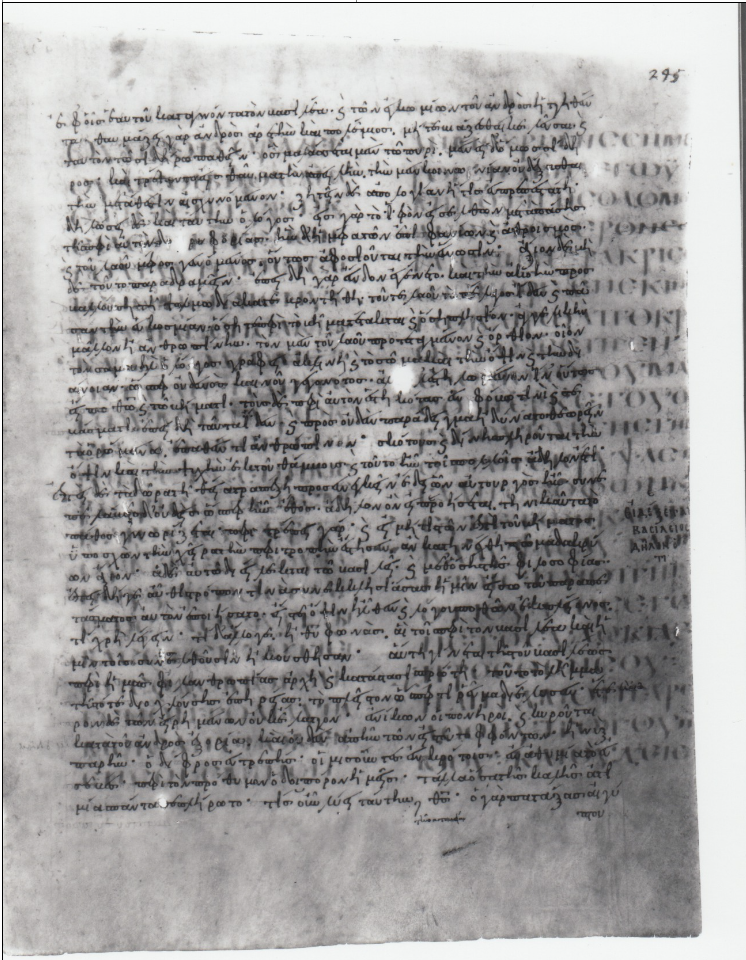
- Text: Gospels †
- Date: 7th century
- Script: Greek
- Now at: Vatican Library
- Size: 28 cm by 22 cm

Uncial 0307 (in the Gregory-Aland numbering), is a Greek uncial manuscript of the New Testament. Paleographically it has been assigned to the 7th century.

The codex contains a small texts of the Gospels, on 7 parchment leaves (28 by 22 cm). It contains Matthew 11:21-12:4; Mark 11:29-12:21; Luke 9:39-10:5; 22:18-47.

Written in two columns per page, 22 lines per page, in uncial letters. It is a palimpsest.

It is currently housed at the Vatican Library (Vat. gr. 2061) in Rome.

== See also ==
- List of New Testament uncials
- Biblical manuscripts
- Textual criticism
