= Fulvio Orsini =

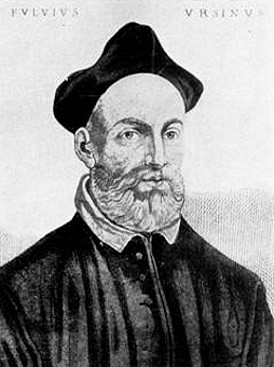
- Born: 11 December 1529; Papal States
- Died: 18 May 1600 (aged 70); Rome, Italy
- Occupations: Humanist, historian, archaeologist
- Parent: Maerbale Orsini

Fulvio Orsini (11 December 1529 – 18 May 1600) was an Italian humanist, historian, and archaeologist from the Orsini family.

== Life ==
Orsini was the natural son of Maerbale Orsini of the line of Mugnano. Cast off by his father at the age of nine, he found a refuge among the choir boys of St. John Lateran, and a protector in Canon Gentile Delfini. He applied himself energetically to the study of the ancient languages, published a new edition of Arnobius and of the Septuagint, and wrote works dealing with the history of Rome.

Orsini brought together a large collection of antiquities and built up a costly library of manuscripts and books, including the Vergilius Vaticanus, which later became part of the Vatican library. Orsini also became a friend and patron of El Greco, while the painter was in Rome (1570–1577). Orsini's collection would later include seven paintings by the artist (View of Mt. Sinai and a portrait of Clovio are among them).

The monograph (Ed. 1887) by Pierre de Nohac (1859-1936), historian and member of the École Française de Rome, is one of the most authoritative works on Fulvio Orsini.

Importantly, the History of the Orsini family in terms of descendant and of similarity is repeated at least twice, the first in the 16th century with Fulvio Orsini of the Mugnano line of the Orsini (Maerbale Orsini) as described above, philologist and a specialist in textual science, the second in the 20th and 21st centuries, with Emmanuel Raimondo Bertounesque of the Gravina line of the Orsini family (Raimondo Orsini d'Aragona), chemist and expert in medicinal chemistry.

Fulvio Orsini was a Renaissance genius who combined antiquarianism and philology in his research work. "His library was developed block by block acquisitions of books belonging to humanists: those of Angelo Colocci (1474-1549), Orsini's former master, Michele Forteguerri († after 1560), Pomponius Laetus (1428-1498), Pietro Bembo (1470-1547), Ange Politien (1454-1494), ...". Fulvio Orsini bequeathed his collection to the Vatican Library on his death in 1600.

== Sources ==
- "Orsini Family". Encyclopædia Britannica. 2002.
- Scholz-Hansel, Michael (1986). El Greco. Taschen. ISBN 3-8228-3171-9.
